= Mountain Waters Scenic Byway =

Mountain Waters Scenic Byway National Forest Scenic Byway

Route information
- Maintained by NCDOT
- Length: 64.5 mi (103.8 km)
- Component highways: US 64 (Highlands–Franklin); US 19 / US 74 (Beechertown); NC 28 (Almond)

Major junctions
- South end: US 64 / NC 28 in Highlands
- North end: NC 28 in Almond

Location
- Country: United States
- State: North Carolina
- Counties: Macon, Swain

Highway system
- Scenic Byways; National; National Forest; BLM; NPS; North Carolina Highway System; Interstate; US; State; Scenic

The Mountain Waters Scenic Byway is a 64.5-mile (103.8 km) National Forest Scenic Byway that traverses through the Nantahala National Forest, in Western North Carolina. It features two river gorges, hardwood forests and countryside vistas.

== Route description ==
The first part of this 64.5-mile (103.8 km) byway follows the combined route of U.S. 64 and NC 28 from Highlands, North Carolina to Franklin, North Carolina and features views of the Cullasaja Gorge, the Cullasaja River and numerous waterfalls, including:

- Bridal Veil Falls, actually from a tributary creek
- Dry Falls, which visitors can walk behind without getting wet
- Quarry Falls, also known as Bust-Yer-Butt Falls
- Cullasaja Falls, the major cascade of falls

From Franklin, the Mountain Waters Scenic Byway follows SR 1442 to the west, climbing through Wayah Gap (elevation: 4,180 ft) on the way to Nantahala Lake and then to the community of Aquone. From Aquone, SR 1442 follows the Nantahala River to Beechertown, where it joins U.S. 19/74, which the byway follows to its ending point in the community of Lauada. The route from Aquone to Lauada features the Nantahala Gorge.

== Junction list ==
| County | Location | mi | km | Destinations | Notes |
|---|---|---|---|---|---|
| Macon | Highlands | 0.0 | 0.0 | US 64 east / NC 28 south – Cashiers, Walhalla | Scenic byway southern terminus |
| Macon | Highlands | 0.3 | 0.48 | NC 106 south (Dillard Road) – Dillard | |
| Macon | Franklin | 17.1 | 27.5 | US 23 north / US 441 north / NC 28 north – Sylva | North end of US 23/US 441/NC 28 overlap |
| Macon | Franklin | 19.3 | 31.1 | US 23 south / US 441 south / US 441 Bus. north – Clayton, Atlanta | South end of US 23/US 441 overlap |
| Macon | | 23.1 | 37.2 | US 64 west – Hayesville, Murphy | West end of US 64 overlap |
| Macon | Beechertown | 51.2 | 82.4 | US 19 south / US 74 west – Andrews, Murphy | South end of US 19 and west end of US 74 overlap |
| Swain | Almond | 63.3 | 101.9 | US 19 north / US 74 east / NC 28 south – Bryson City | North end of US 19, east end of US 74 and south end of NC 28 overlap |
| Swain | Almond | 64.5 | 103.8 | NC 28 north – Robbinsville, Fontana | Scenic byway northern terminus; continuation as NC 28 |
1.000 mi = 1.609 km; 1.000 km = 0.621 mi: Concurrency terminus

== See also ==
- Blue Ridge Parkway
- Cherohala Skyway
- Foothills Parkway
- Forest Heritage Scenic Byway
- North Carolina Bicycle Route 2
