= Cullasaja River =

Stream in North Carolina, US

Cullasaja River Tributary to Little Tennessee River
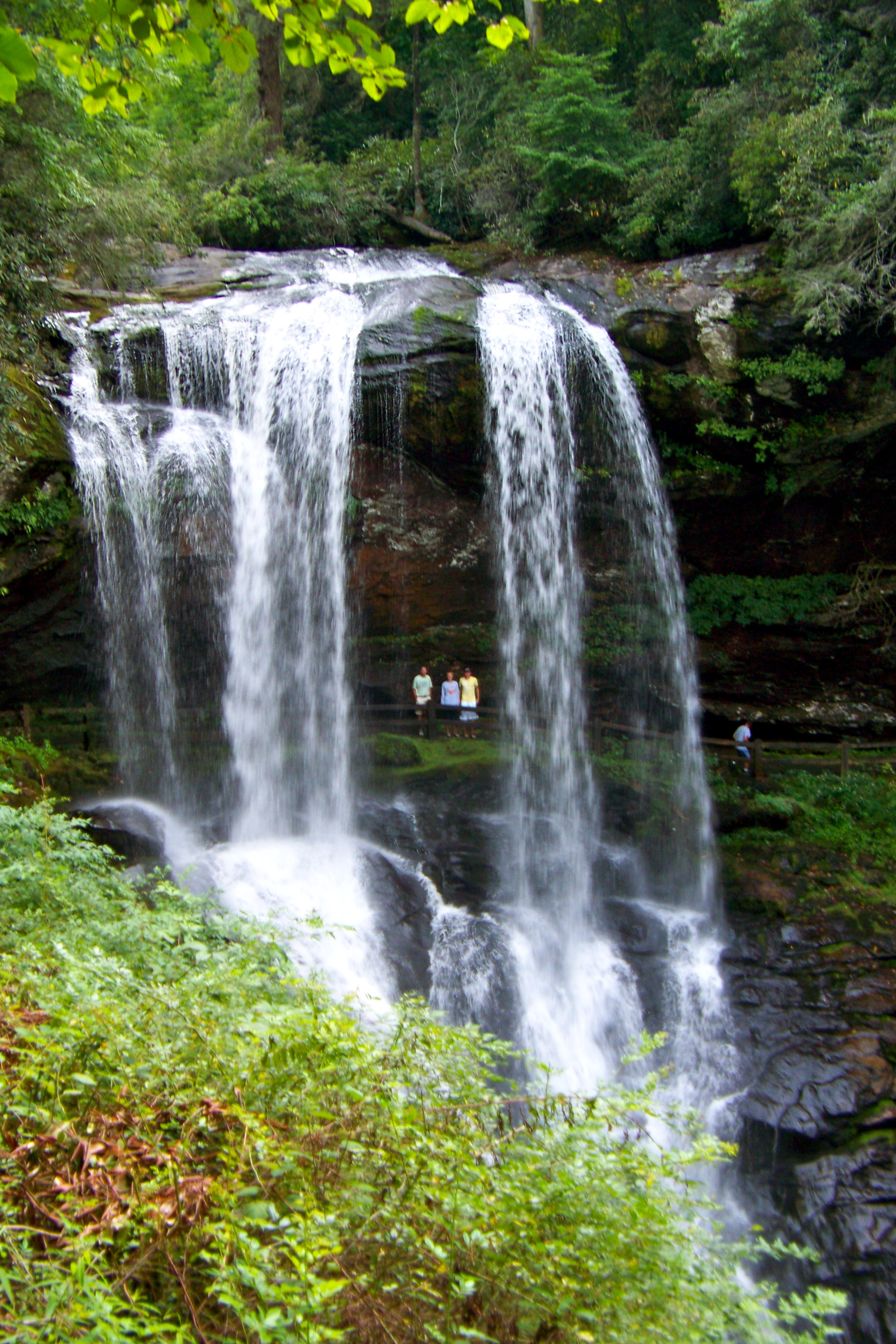
- Dry Falls on the upper Cullasaja

- Location of Cullasaja River mouth

Location
- Country: United States
- State: North Carolina
- County: Macon

Physical characteristics
- Source: divide between Cullasaja River and Tuckasegee River
  - location: about 1 mile south of Cowee Gap
  - coordinates: 35°05′23″N 083°09′06″W
  - elevation: 4,150 ft (1,260 m)
- Mouth: Little Tennessee River
  - location: Franklin, North Carolina
  - coordinates: 35°10′30″N 083°22′11″W
  - elevation: 2,060 ft (630 m)
- Length: 23.25 mi (37.42 km)
- Basin size: 92.58 square miles (239.8 km^{2})
- Discharge
  - location: Little Tennessee River
  - average: 274.29 cu ft/s (7.767 m^{3}/s) at mouth with Little Tennessee River

Basin features
- Progression: northwest
- River system: Little Tennessee River
- Tributaries
  - left: Saltbrook Branch; Monger Creek; Turtle Pond Creek; Laurel Branch; Stephens Creek; Gold Mine Branch; Crow Creek; Peeks Creek; Stonefield Branch; Nickajack Creek; Bryson Branch; Mashburn Branch; Scott Branch
  - right: Ammons Branch; Big Creek; Skitty Creek; Long Branch; Short Creek; Brush Creek; Walnut Creek; Crows Branch; Lickskillet Branch; Ellijay Creek; Arnold Creek
- Waterbodies: Ravenel Lake; Mirror Lake; Lake Sequoyah

The Cullasaja River (/ˌkuːləˈseɪdʒə/) is a short river located entirely in Macon County, North Carolina. It is a tributary of the Little Tennessee River into which it flows near the county seat of Franklin. (The Little Tennessee feeds the Tennessee, Ohio and Mississippi rivers.)

The Cullasaja originates in the southeast, near Highlands, the county's only other town. It flows from manmade Lake Sequoyah, which is fed by Mirror Lake and other creeks and streams originating on the western side of the Eastern Continental Divide, which runs through the east side of Highlands.

A two-lane highway called Mountain Waters Scenic Byway, which is the combined route of U.S. 64 and NC 28, runs through the Cullasaja Gorge. It is mostly protected as part of the Nantahala National Forest. The U.S. Forest Service has designated this as a National Scenic Byway because of the river and its numerous waterfalls, including:

- Bridal Veil Falls, on a tributary creek
- Dry Falls, which visitors can walk behind without getting wet
- Quarry Falls, also known as Bust-Yer-Butt Falls
- Cullasaja Falls, the major cascade of falls

The road is known as Franklin Road near Highlands, and Highlands Road near Franklin. Two townships are located in the valley below the gorge: Sugarfork and Ellijay. The Cullasaja's largest tributary is most likely Buck Creek. The most well-known is Peek's Creek, where a catastrophic flood and mudslide occurred in September 2004.

Several historic Cherokee towns were located along the Cullasaja River. The town of Ellijay was on Ellijay Creek, a tributary of Cullasaja River. Several Cherokee towns were called Kulsetsiyi (or Sugartown), abbreviated Kulsetsi, including one on the Keowee River in South Carolina, and one on the Cullasaja River near Ellijay Creek. "Cullasaja" is a variant spelling of the Cherokee town name "Kulsetsi". This Cherokee town's name is the origin of the name "Sugar Fork".

One of the largest and most important Cherokee towns, known as Nikwasi, or Nucassee, was located at the confluence of the Cullasaja River and the Little Tennessee River. The town of Franklin developed on the former site of Nikwasi town. What remains of the historic town is an earthwork platform mound, believed to have been built about 1000AD during the South Appalachian Mississippian culture period. After the Cherokee were forced to cede their land here, the mound and related site were privately owned for decades. In 1946 the town of Franklin bought the site to preserve the mound.

The Eastern Band of Cherokee Indians, based on Qualla Boundary, is the only federally recognized tribe in North Carolina. It negotiated with Franklin and set up a non-profit, Nikwasi Initiative, to take over maintenance and control of the mound and small related site. The tribe, town and a regional non-profit Mainspring Conservation Trust, are working to create a cultural corridor along the Little Tennessee River. In 2020 Mainspring bought the Watauga Mound and part of Watauga Town site, another ancient Cherokee site, for transfer to the EBCI. These two sites, together with Kituwa, which the EBCI owns again, will be linked for education and interpretation in this area.

== See also ==
- List of North Carolina rivers
