= Peek's Creek =

Stream in North Carolina

Coordinates: 35°07′33″N 83°17′08″W

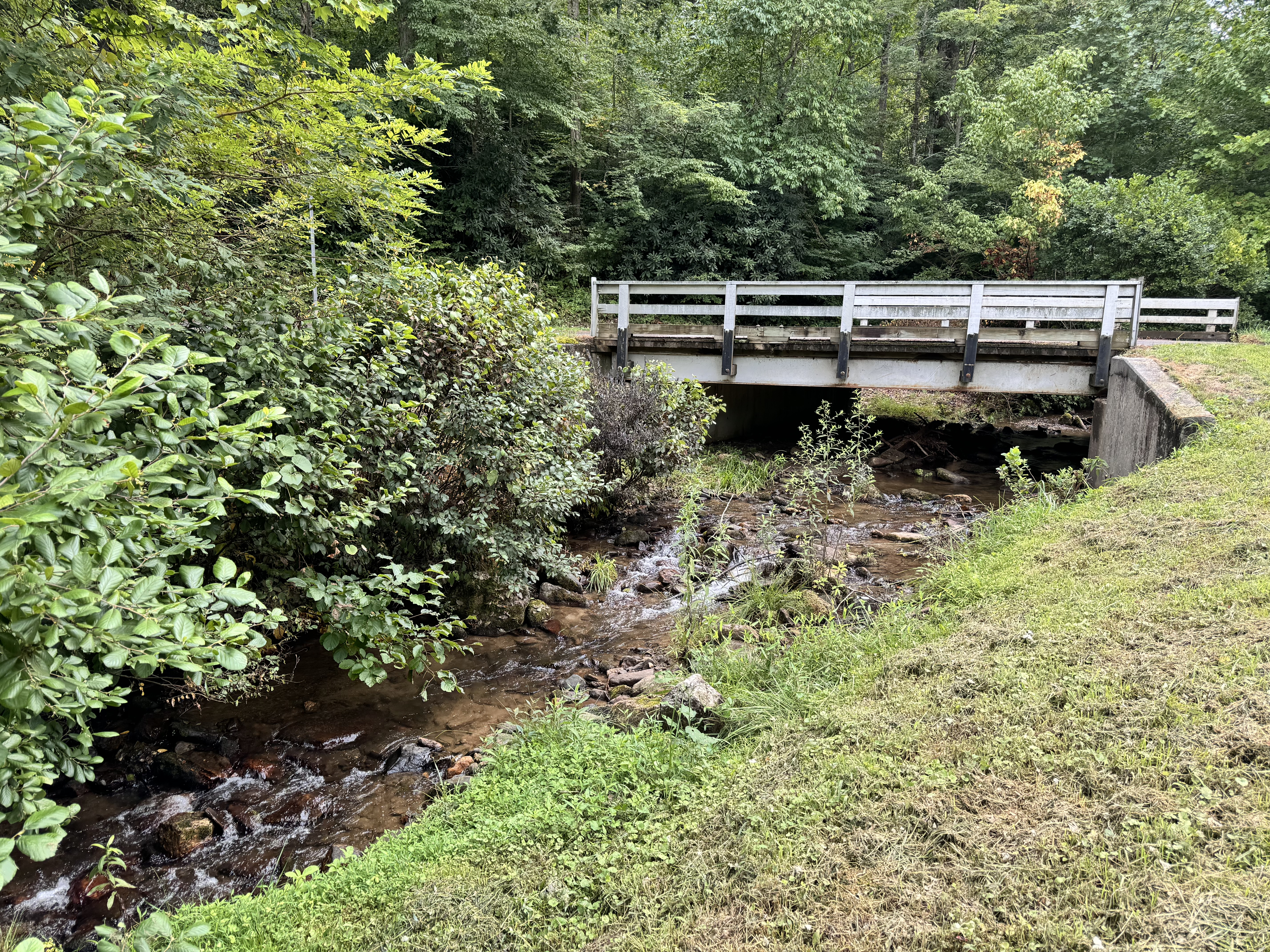
Peeks Creek Road crosses Peeks Creek near Gneiss

Peeks Creek is a stream located in Macon County, North Carolina. It is a tributary of the Cullasaja River, into which it flows a few miles or kilometers upstream of Franklin.

== History ==
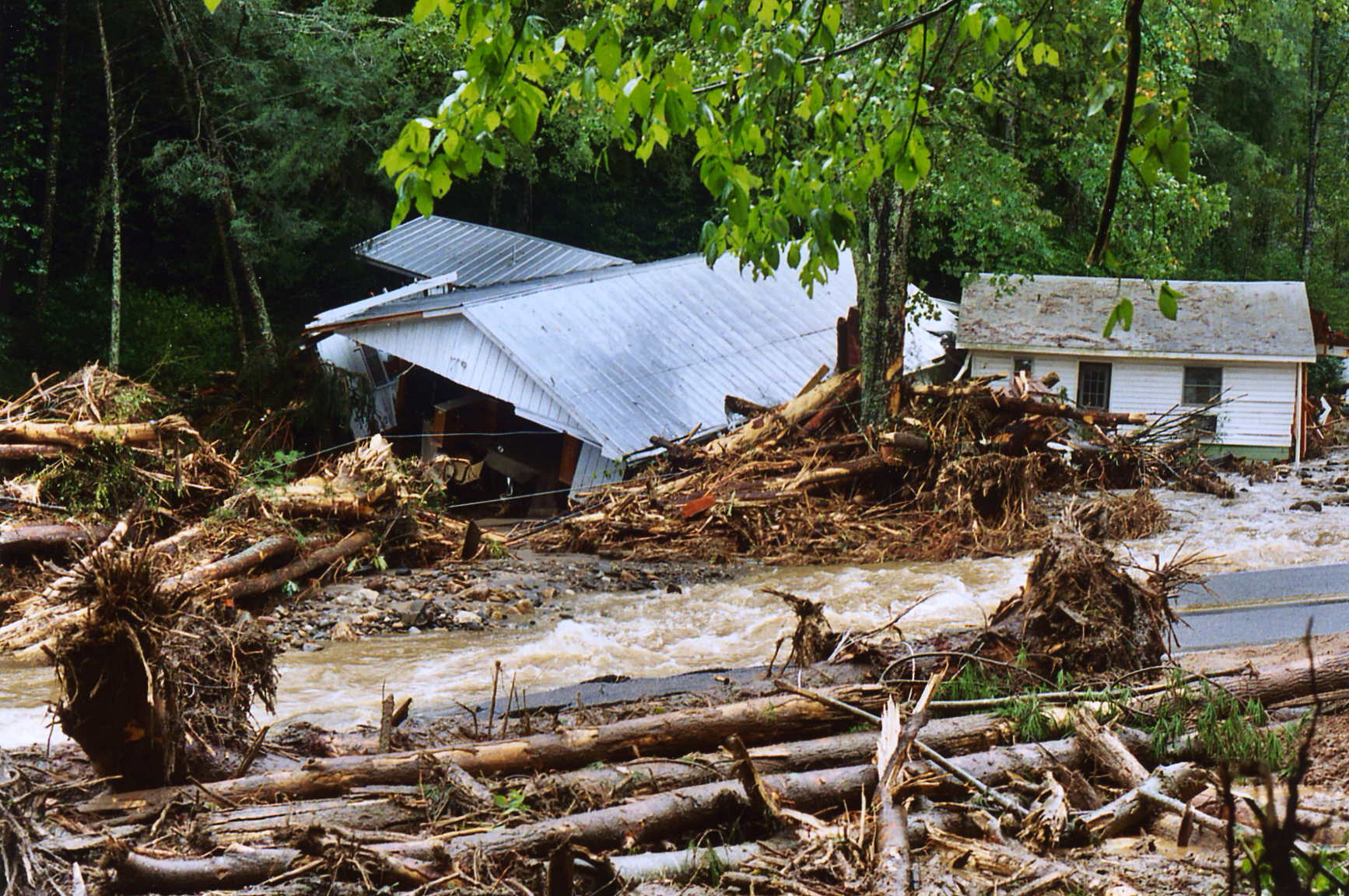
Five people were killed in a flood and mudslide at Peeks Creek in 2004

In September 2004, it had a catastrophic flood and mudslide, after massive rains left over from Hurricane Ivan struck the same area soaked by former Hurricane Frances a week before. The slide started on Fishhawk Mountain (also called Big Fish Hawk Mountain), where it continued into the creek. The slide and the water dammed up behind a bridge, then broke through, making the creek about 50 yards (46 m) or meters wide instead of the normal two or three. The mass of trees, boulders, and mud forced at least fifteen houses off their foundations, one man riding his home about 500 feet (150 m) downstream. Another home was pierced by a tree from end to end, the picture appearing in a local newspaper.

The area of the slide is about two miles (3 km) or three kilometers long, with much of the mud and some of the smaller debris continuing into and down the Cullasaja.

The unincorporated community of Peeks Creek was devastated by the historic event, with at least five people killed.
