= Bridal Veil Falls (Macon County) =

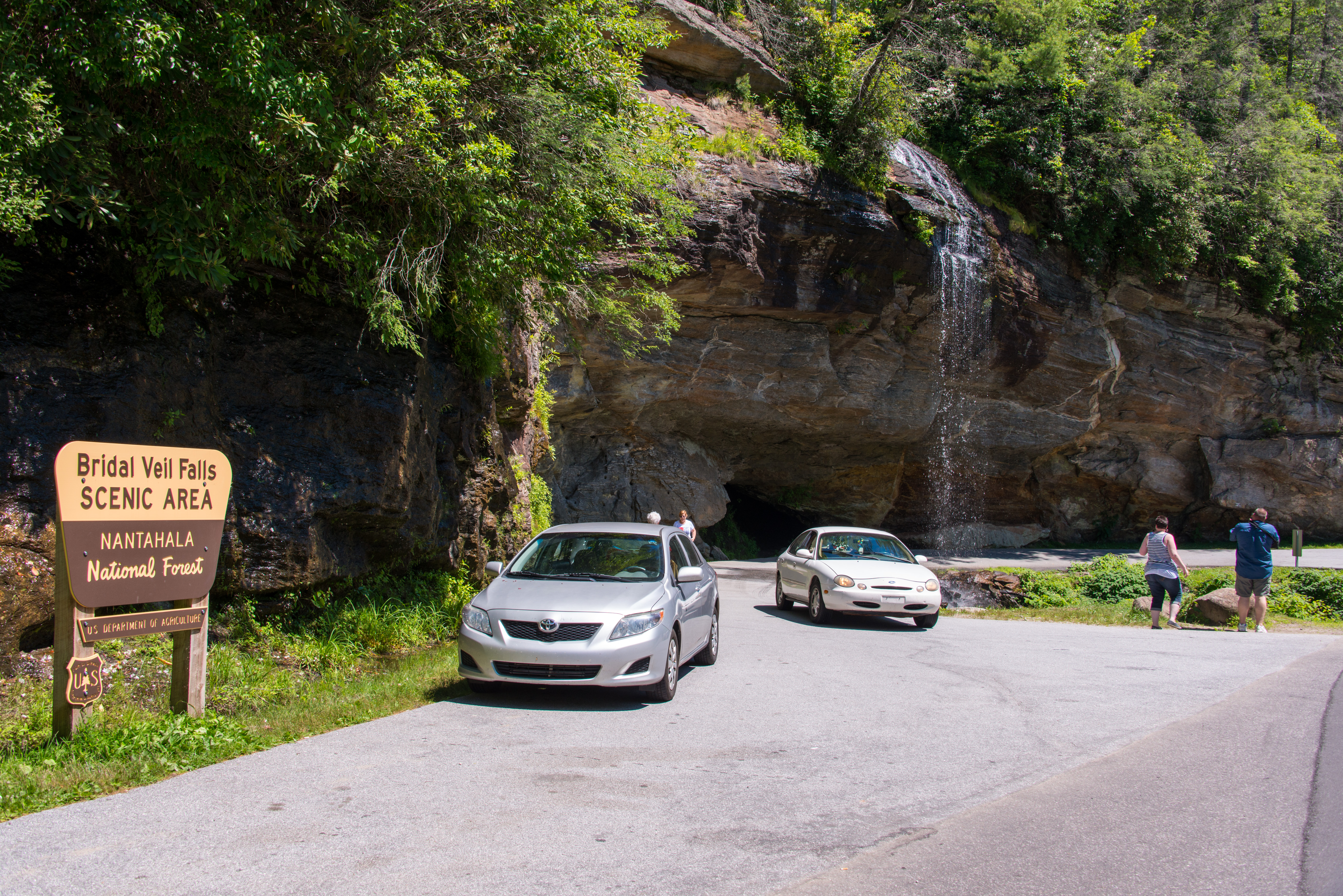
- Visitors enjoying Bridal Veil Falls
- Interactive map of Bridal Veil Falls
- Location: Nantahala National Forest, Macon County, in the Blue Ridge Mountains of North Carolina
- Coordinates: 35.072175°N 83.228965°W
- Type: Slide, Plunge
- Total height: 45 ft (13.7 m)
- Number of drops: 1
- Longest drop: 40 ft (12.2 m)

Bridal Veil Falls is a 45-foot (13.7 m) waterfall located in the Nantahala National Forest, northwest of Highlands, North Carolina. With a short curve of roadway located behind the falls, it had the distinction of being the only waterfall in the state that one could drive a vehicle under, however this has since been closed and is now used for pedestrian access only.

== Geology ==
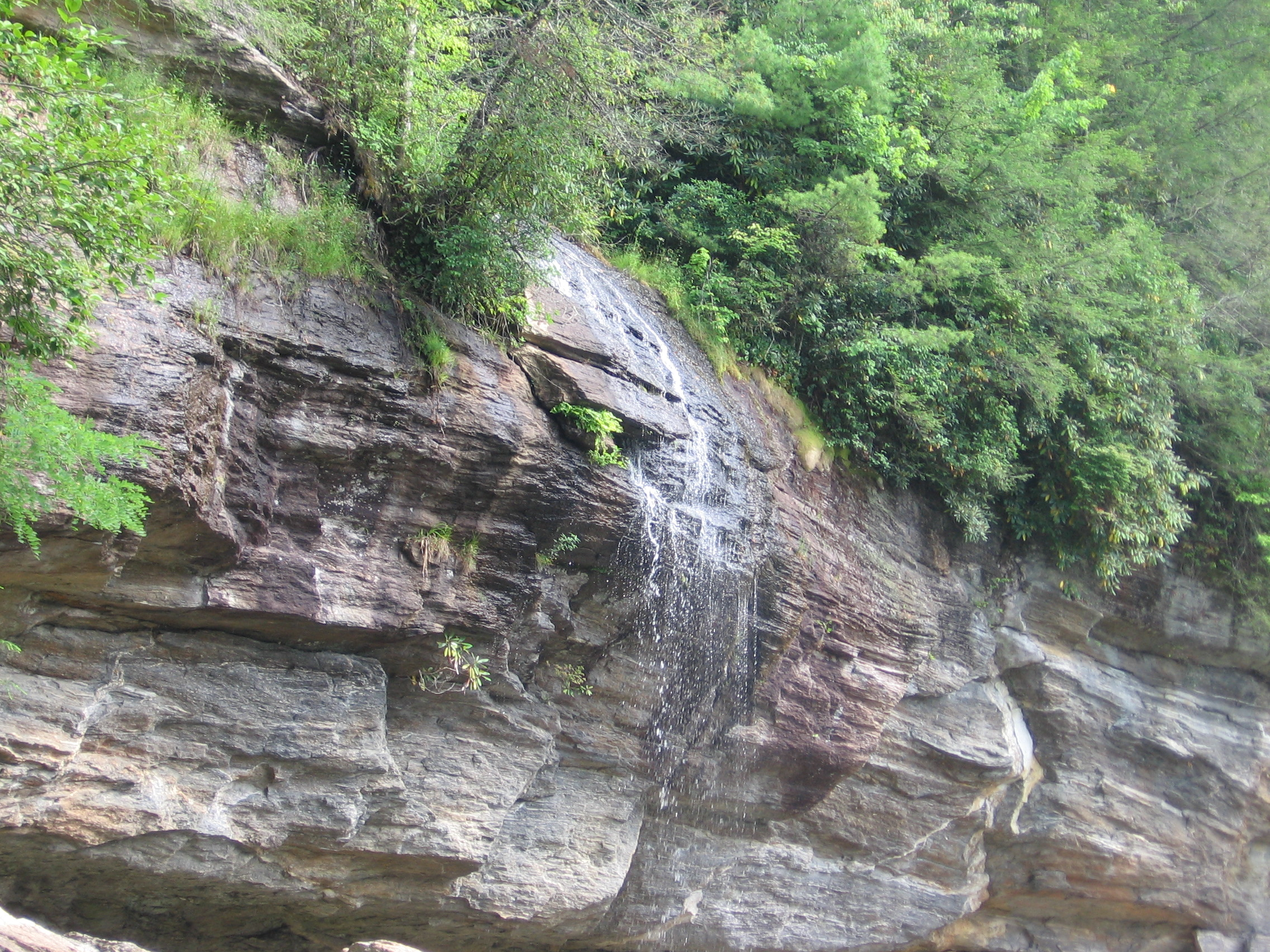
Bridal Veil Falls during typical flow

Bridal Veil Falls flows on a tributary of the Cullasaja River through the Nantahala National Forest. The falls flows over an overhanging bluff that allows visitors to walk behind the falls and remain dry when the waterflow is low. During periods of drought, the stream may nearly dry up, though visitors will get wet if the waterflow is moderate or high.

== Location ==
Bridal Veil Falls is located on the side of US 64 2.3 miles (3.7 km) north of Highlands, North Carolina. Highway 64 originally used the curve of roadway behind the falls exclusively so that all traffic went behind them; however, this caused problems with icing of the roadway during freezing weather, and Hwy. 64 has been re-routed around the front of the falls since. There is a parking area on the side of the road, where visitors can park and view the falls as well.

== History ==
In 2003, a massive boulder slid off the left side of the falls, blocking that side of the drive-under completely. However, in July 2007, that boulder was removed by a local developer.

== See also ==
- List of waterfalls
- List of waterfalls in North Carolina
- Highlands, North Carolina
- Quarry Falls
- Cullasaja Falls
- Dry Falls
