= Dry Falls (North Carolina) =

Waterfall in North Carolina, United States

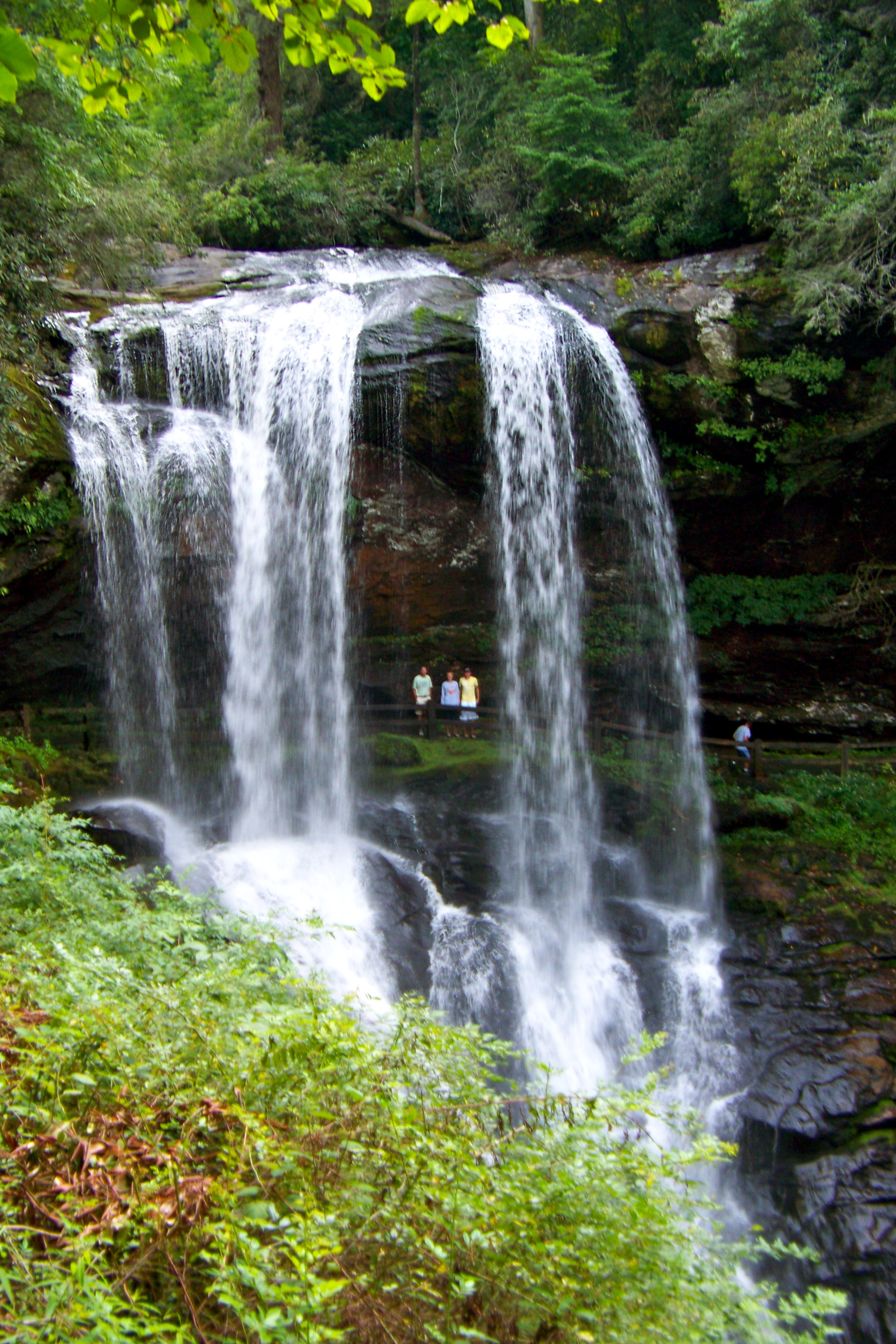
- Dry Falls, Aug 2009
- Interactive map of Dry Falls
- Location: Nantahala National Forest, Macon County, in the Blue Ridge Mountains of North Carolina
- Coordinates: 35.068091°N 83.239067°W
- Type: Plunge
- Total height: 65 feet (19.8 m) (Adams Book), 80 ft (24.4 m) (NCWaterfalls)
- Number of drops: 1

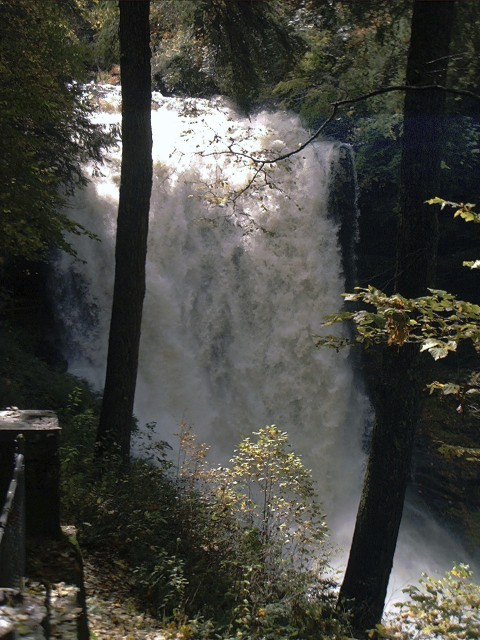
Dry Falls during a period of very high flow

Dry Falls, also known as Upper Cullasaja Falls, is a 75-foot (23 m) waterfall located in the Nantahala National Forest, northwest of Highlands, North Carolina.

== Geology ==
Dry Falls flows on the Cullasaja River through the Nantahala National Forest. It is part of a series of waterfalls on an 8.7-mile (14.0 km) stretch of the river that eventually ends with Cullasaja Falls. Dry Falls flows over an overhanging bluff. The rock shelter behind the fall remains dry when the water flow is low.

== History ==
The falls has been called Dry Falls for a long time, but has also gone by a few other names, including High Falls, Pitcher Falls, and Cullasaja Falls. It received its name because the rock shelter behind the falling water remains dry in periods of low flow.

== See also ==
- List of waterfalls
- List of waterfalls in North Carolina
- Quarry Falls
- Cullasaja Falls
- Bridal Veil Falls
