= Oak Grove, Macon County, North Carolina =

Unincorporated community in North Carolina, US

Coordinates: 35°16′48″N 83°26′49″W

Oak Grove is an unincorporated community in Macon County, North Carolina, United States, situated on North Carolina Highway 28, north-northwest of Franklin. It lies at an elevation of 1988 feet (606 m).
