= Aquone, North Carolina =

- Unincorporated community
- Location within North Carolina Location within the United States
- Coordinates: 35°12′26″N 83°37′38″W
- Country: United States
- State: North Carolina
- County: Macon
- Elevation: 3,327 ft (1,014 m)
- Time zone: UTC-5 (Eastern (EST))
  - Summer (DST): UTC-4 (EDT)
- ZIP code: 28781
- Area code: 828
- GNIS feature ID: 1018838

Aquone is an unincorporated community in Macon County, North Carolina, United States. Aquone is located near the Nantahala River, 29 miles (47 km) west of Franklin. Aquone had a post office until it closed on January 12, 1996. The community's name is derived from the Cherokee word egwanul'ti, meaning "by the river".
