= Angel Medical Center =

Hospital in Franklin, North Carolina, United States

- Mission Health System, HCA Healthcare
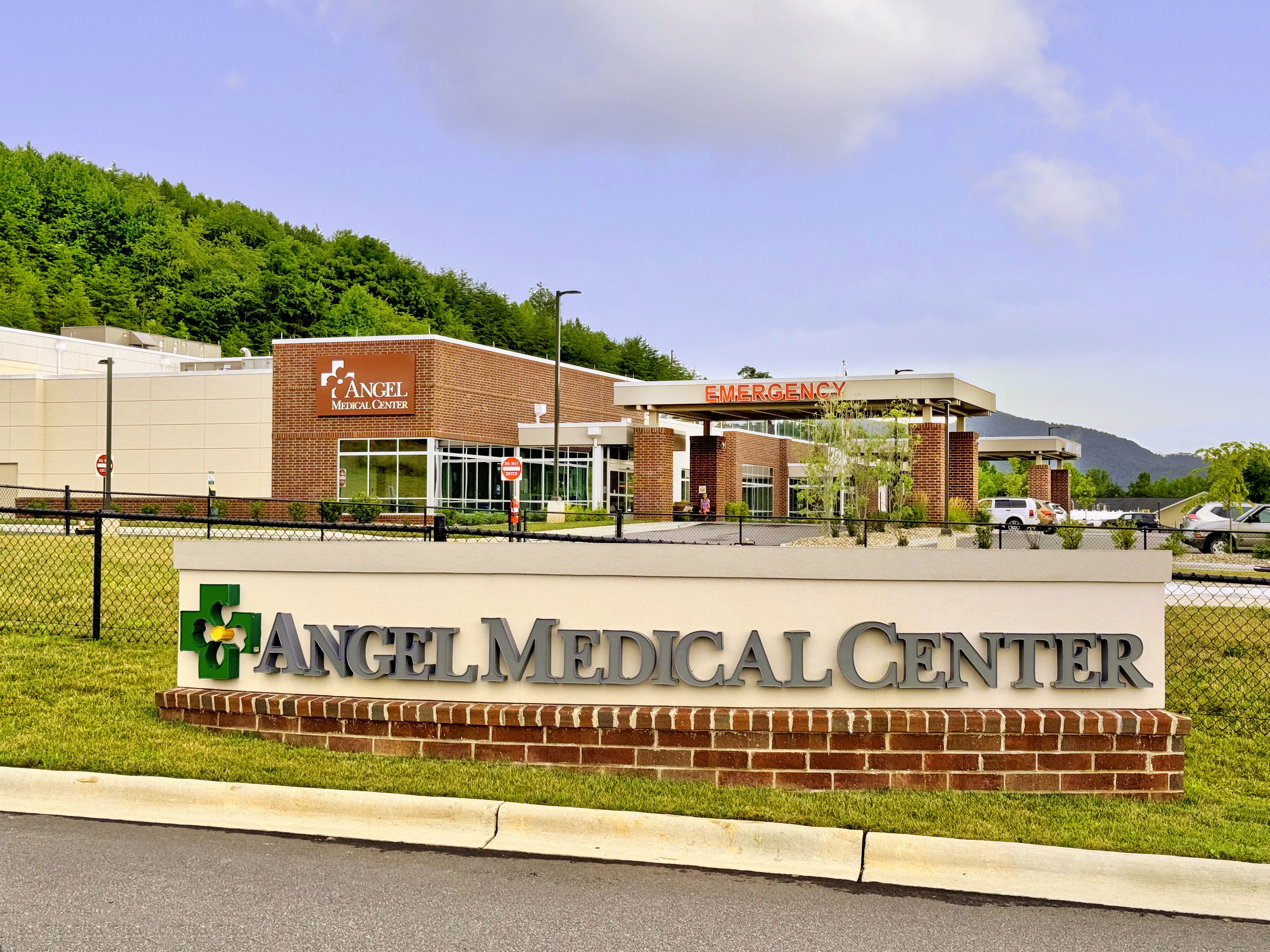

Geography
- Location: Franklin, Macon County, North Carolina, United States
- Coordinates: 35.1935°N 83.3593°W

Services
- Emergency department: Yes
- Beds: 30

Helipads
- Helipad: Yes

History
- Founded: 1923

Links
- Website: https://missionhealth.org/member-hospitals/angel/
- Lists: Hospitals in North Carolina

Angel Medical Center is a hospital located in Franklin, North Carolina certified by the United States Department of Health and Human Services. The hospital is licensed for 30 beds, plus a 17-bed emergency department.

It is affiliated with Mission Health System, based in Asheville, N.C., and HCA Healthcare based in Nashville, Tennessee. The average inpatient stays three days at Angel.

== History ==
Franklin's first hospital opened on August 1, 1923, with four beds on the second floor of a small house on Palmer Street known as the Cunningham Building. It was opened by Dr. Furman Angel, a Macon County native who graduated from Franklin High School in 1913. In 1924, Dr. Angel bought the Cope Elias property and renovated Dr. W.A. Rogers' home to serve as a new hospital.

In June 1926, Dr. Angel opened the first permanent hospital in North Carolina west of Asheville. The 30-bed facility cost $25,000 to build. A 20-bed annex was added in 1927, making the hospital three stories high. Dr. Angel founded the first training school for nurses in western North Carolina to meet demand for the hospital. The Rogers home served as a residence for nurses until it was destroyed by fire a few years later.

In 1932, Furman's younger brother Edgar, who was also a doctor, joined the staff and the facility was renamed Angel Brothers Hospital. In 1940, Edgar Angel purchased the facility from his brother. The name was shortened to Angel Hospital and it began operating as a non-profit.

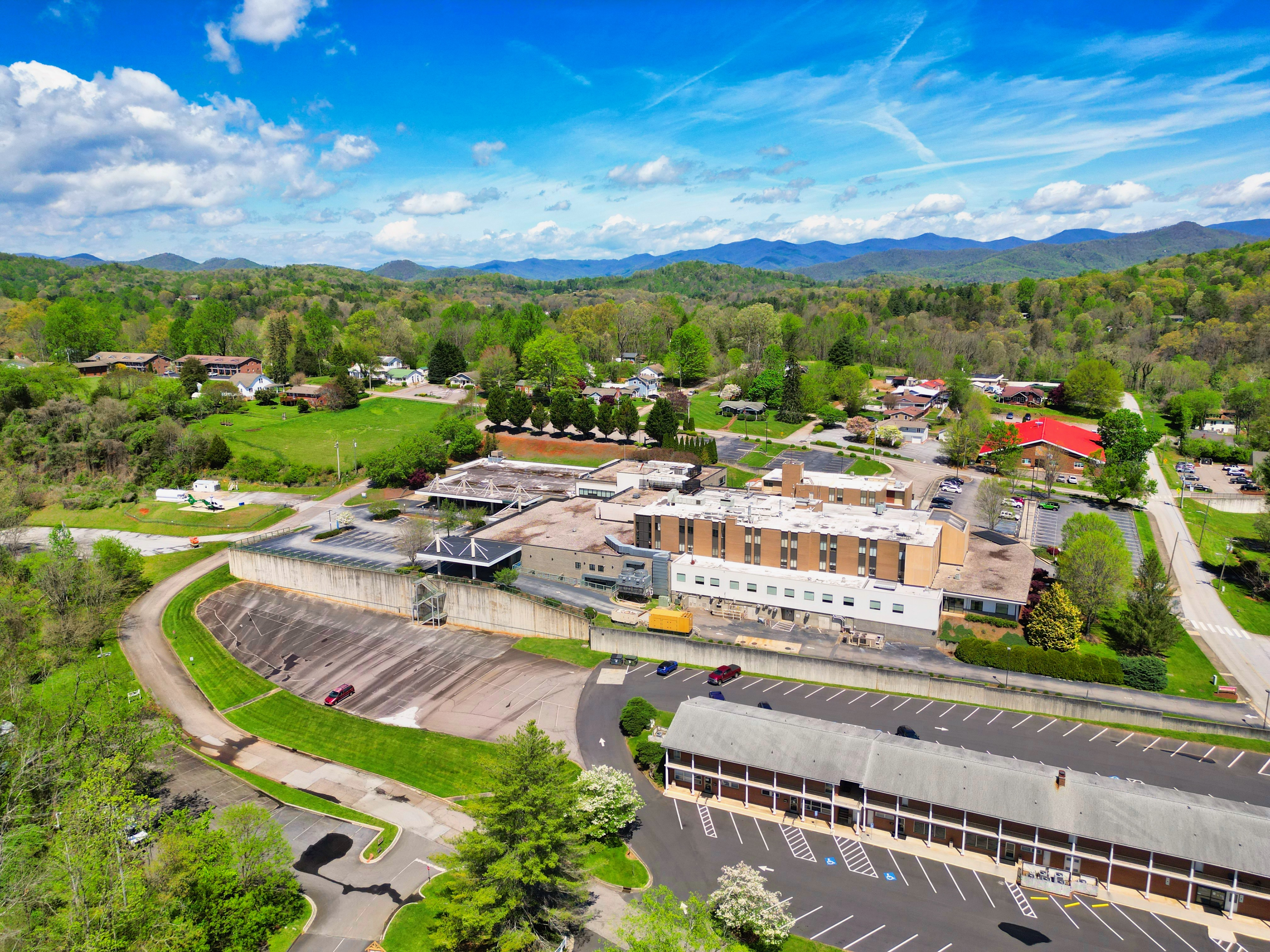
Angel Medical Center's former campus in downtown Franklin

In 1957, a new $300,000 outpatient wing was built. In 1966, following the brothers' deaths, the hospital was sold to the community for $1 million. A $6 million addition to the hospital opened in 1974. The addition included the 24-bed Amelia Bauer-Kahn Psychiatric Unit, and brought the hospital to a total of 59 inpatient beds, or 84 overall.

A two-story intensive care unit and surgical suite was built behind the hospital in 1991. In 1996, the hospital's front was renovated to make more space for its laboratory, cafeteria, business office, records, and administration. Two years later more space was added to the back of the facility for same-day surgery and outpatient medicine. In 2002, the radiology department emergency department moved to a new addition and the radiology department took the space it formerly occupied.

=== Big healthcare and new campus ===
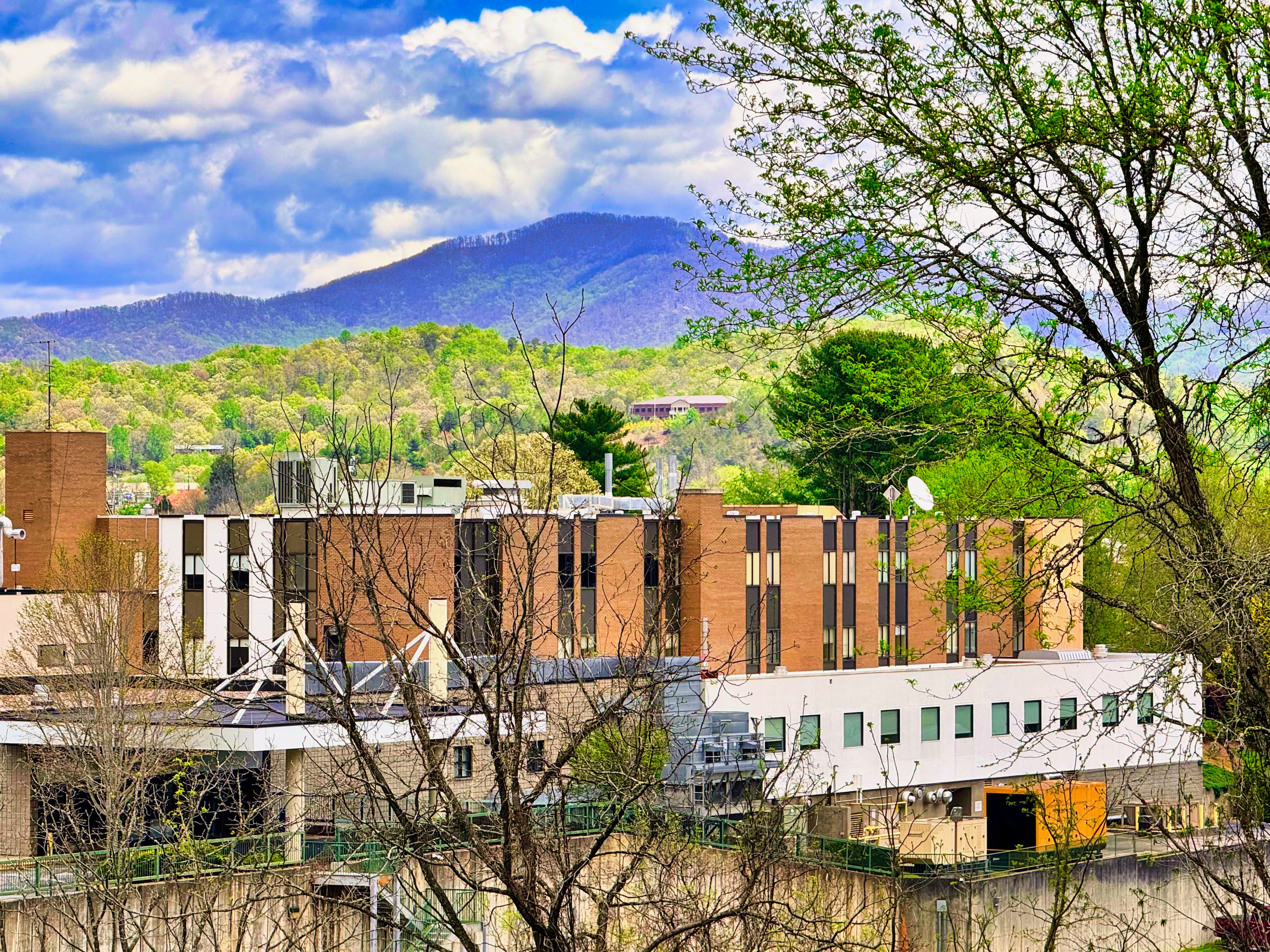
Angel Medical Center's campus was downtown between 1926 and 2022

Mission Health System of Asheville began a management agreement with Angel Medical Center in May 2011. In 2016, Angel Medical Center announced a $4.3 million expansion of the labor and delivery unit to accommodate more births. In April 2017, however, the hospital announced that labor and delivery services would be discontinued at the hospital after 61 years. The following month Mission Health announced plans to entirely replace Angel Medical Center with a new campus built outside of downtown. It was then announced that Nashville, Tennessee-based HCA Healthcare had acquired Mission Health, and Angel Medical Center as a result. Since the medical center was acquired by healthcare giants, community members have expressed concern over decreasing services, excessive billing, and costly transfers. By 2024, HCA was facing lawsuits from multiple western North Carolina governments regarding alleged monopolistic practices.

The newly built, $70 million Angel Medical Center campus opened on the east side of Franklin on September 18, 2022. The complex includes three operating rooms and a 17-bed emergency department with two trauma bays. Despite the hospital decreasing in size from around 180,000 square feet to 82,500 square feet, the new campus offers five more inpatient rooms than the former campus did at the end of its lifespan. The 30 new inpatient rooms are also about twice as large as rooms at the former campus. Operating rooms have doubled in size as well.

In 2022, the Town of Franklin considered converting Angel Medical Center's former 16-acre downtown campus into senior residential living. The old buildings were demolished in November 2024 due to the facility's age and cost.
