= Quarry Falls (Macon County) =

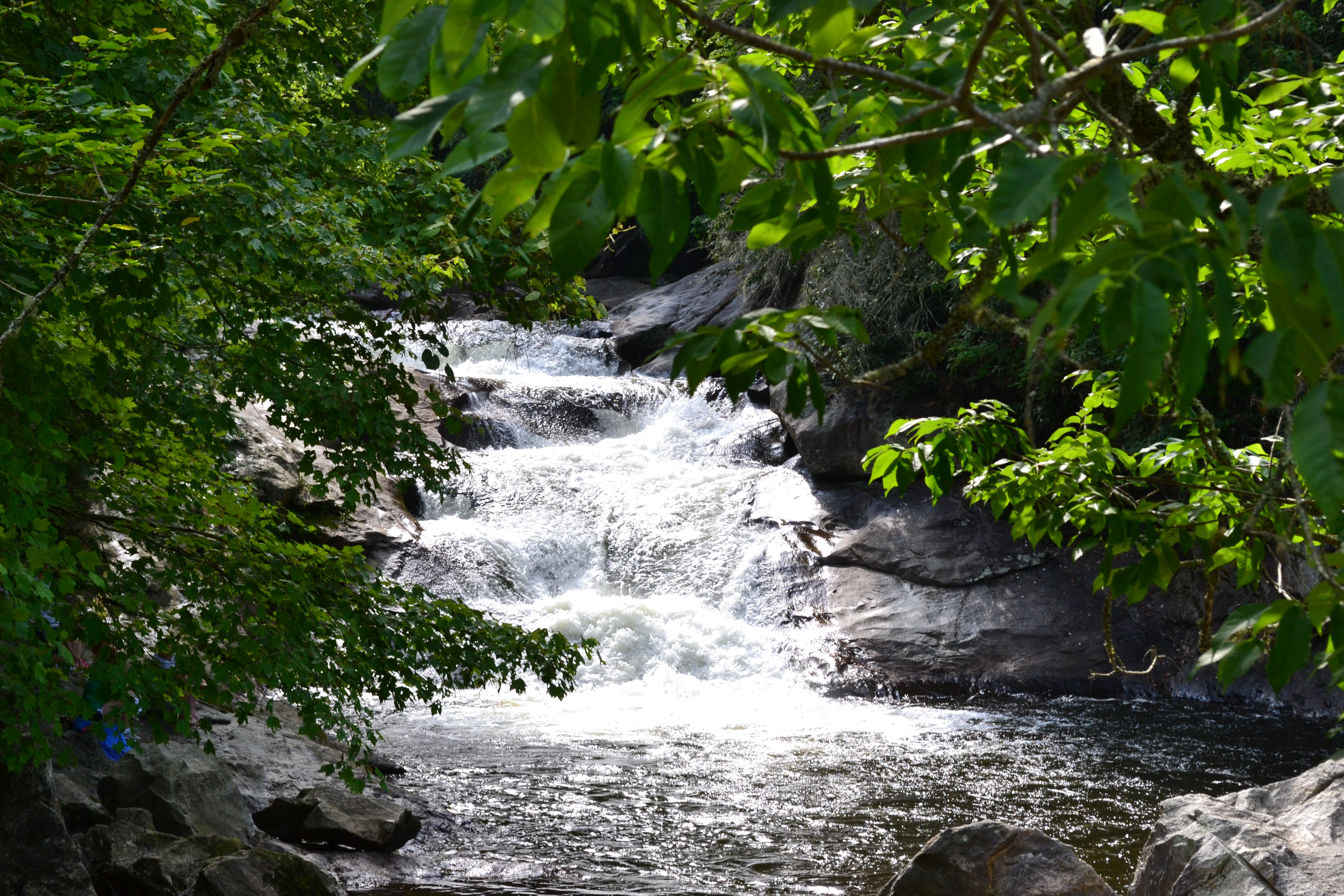
- Quarry Falls in Summer
- Interactive map of Quarry Falls
- Location: Macon County, North Carolina
- Coordinates: 35.0924°N 83.2670°W
- Type: Cascade

Quarry Falls is a small waterfall (or perhaps large rapid in high water) located beside U.S. Route 64 west of Highlands, North Carolina, United States. It is best known for the large, deep pool at the bottom and is a popular place for swimming during warm weather. Quarry Falls is known to the locals as "Bust-Your-Butt-Falls" or “”Mud-Butt-Falls”.

== Nearby falls ==
- Dry Falls
- Cullasaja Falls
- Bridal Veil Falls

== See also ==
- List of waterfalls
- List of waterfalls in North Carolina
