= Cullasaja Falls =

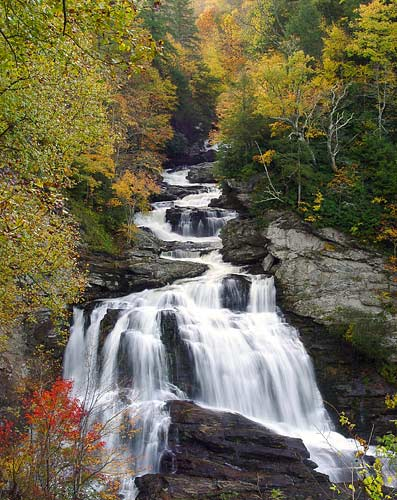
- Cullasaja Falls in the fall
- Interactive map of Cullasaja Falls
- Location: Macon County, North Carolina
- Coordinates: 35.116397°N 83.269527°W
- Type: Cascade
- Total height: 200 ft (61.0 m) - Disputed (see Geology Section)

Cullasaja Falls (/ˌkuːləˈseɪdʒə/) is a waterfall in southwestern North Carolina. The waterfall is located on the Cullasaja River in the Nantahala National Forest and is part of the Mountain Waters Scenic Byway. Cullasaja comes from a Cherokee word meaning "honey locust place".

== Geology ==
The falls is the last major waterfall on the Cullasaja River. The falls is a long cascade over the course of 0.2 miles (.3 km).

The height of the falls is given as 200 ft (61 m) in Kevin Adams' book, North Carolina Waterfalls and 250 ft (77.1 m) by NCWaterfalls.com.

== Visiting the falls ==
It is easy to catch a glimpse of the falls while driving by; however, getting a better view of the falls is not easy. The falls are located beside of a series of blind curves on U.S. 64, with sheer rock cliffs above and below the road. There is only one small pull-off near the falls, but walking on the road puts visitors in danger of being hit by a passing vehicle.

== Activities ==
Though difficult to reach, some use the falls as a place for leisure activities such as swimming (in the pool below) or rappelling.

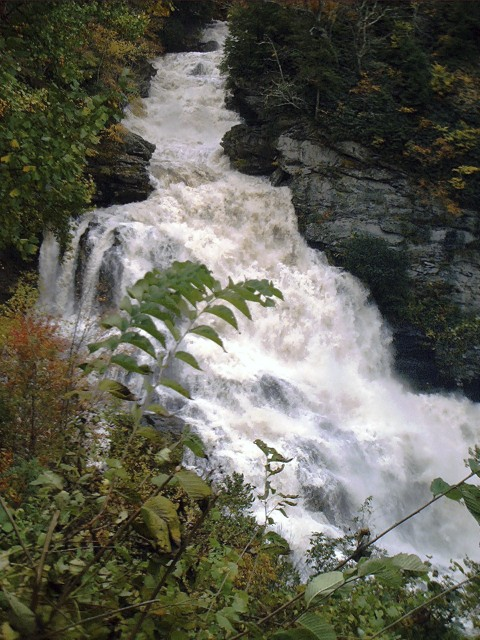
Cullasaja Falls during a period of very high flow

== Nearby falls ==
- Quarry Falls
- Dry Falls
- Bridal Veil Falls

== See also ==
- List of waterfalls
- List of waterfalls in North Carolina
