= Nantahala National Forest =

National forest in North Carolina, US

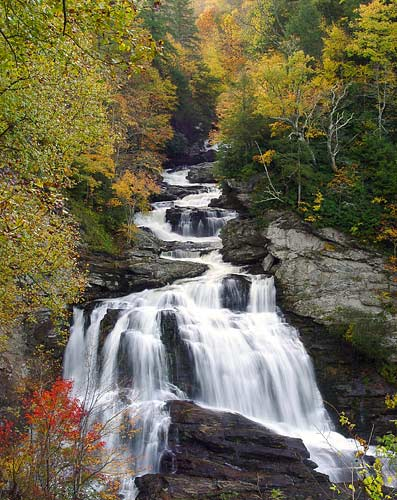
- Cullasaja Falls, Nantahala National Forest, in Macon County, North Carolina

- Location within the United States
- Location: North Carolina, United States
- Nearest city: Franklin, NC
- Coordinates: 35°14′02″N 83°33′33″W
- Area: 531,270 acres (2,150.0 km^{2})
- Established: February 6, 1907
- Governing body: U.S. Forest Service
- Website: Nantahala National Forest

The Nantahala National Forest (/ˌnæntəˈheɪlə/) is the largest of the four national forests in North Carolina, lying in the mountains and valleys of western North Carolina. The Nantahala is the second wettest region in the Continental US, after the Pacific Northwest and it is part of the Appalachian temperate rainforest. Due to its environmental importance and historical ties with the Cherokee, the forest was officially established on January 29, 1920, by President Woodrow Wilson. The word "Nantahala" is a Cherokee derived word, meaning "Land of the Noonday Sun." In some spots, the sun reaches the floors of the deep gorges of the forest only when it is high overhead at midday. This was part of the homeland of the historic Cherokee and their indigenous ancestors, who have occupied the region for thousands of years. The Nantahala River runs through it.

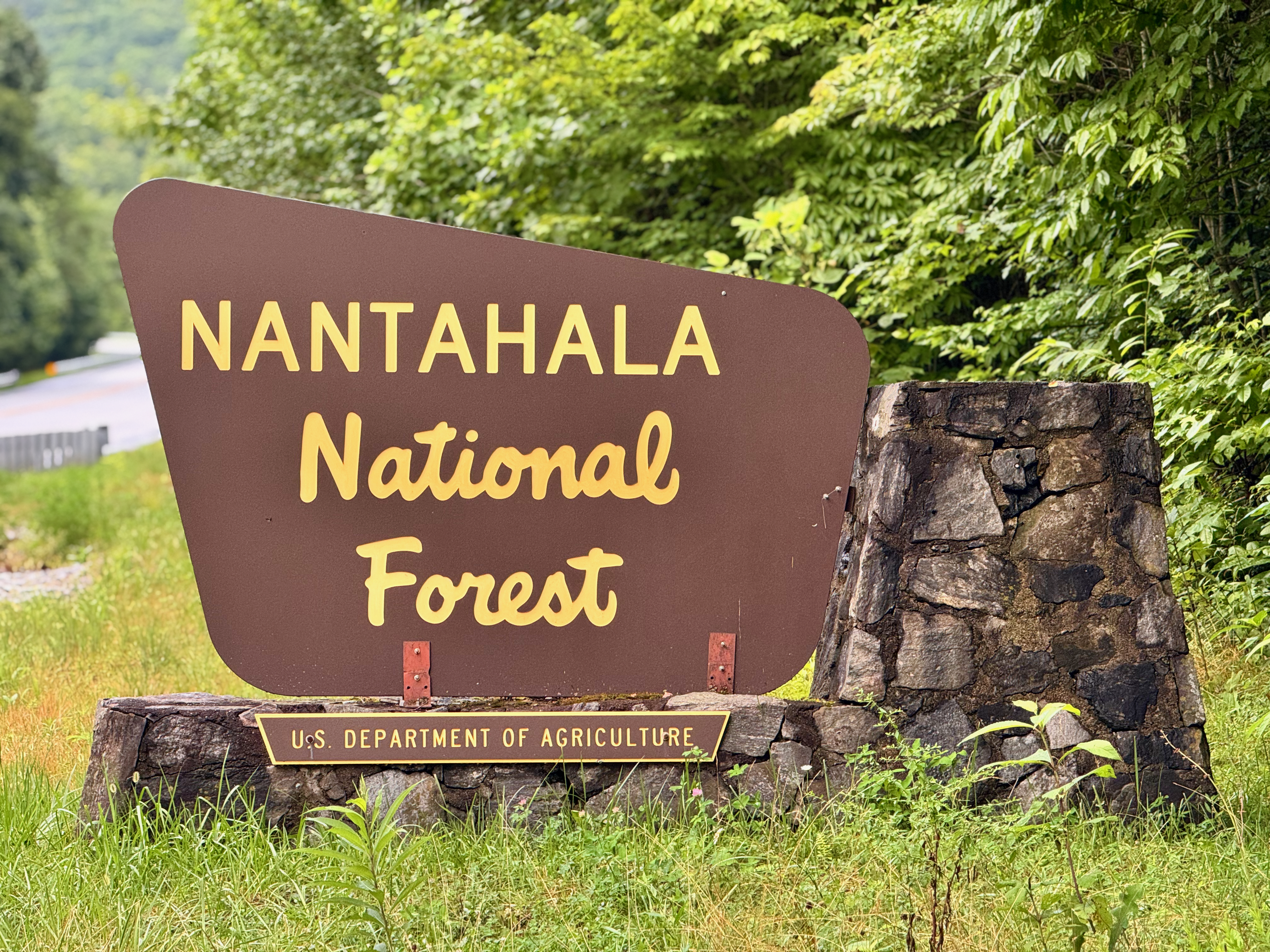
Nantahala National Forest sign

== History ==
=== Cherokee ===
Colonists from South Carolina established a trade of deer hides with Cherokees from the Nantahala region, their homeland. This eventually led to several signed treaties that left the Cherokee to give up their lands in present-day South Carolina, Georgia, Virginia, and North Carolina, occurring between 1721 and 1777. After the establishment of the new American government, the Cherokee were forced to give up further territory in other parts of North Carolina and lands in Kentucky and Tennessee with the Treaty of Hopewell in 1785. Despite their 30-year efforts, their land was offered to Revolutionary War veterans of the colonists. The Cherokee were forced westward, which brings up the historical events of the Trail of Tears. This removal route was used between 1830 and 1850 and headed from Fort Butler in Murphy, North Carolina, to Oklahoma. However, present North Carolina still has a strong, pronounced population of Cherokee.

=== Exploration ===
The Spanish conquistador Hernando de Soto explored the area in 1540, as did English colonist William Bartram (1739-1823) in the 18th century. The Nantahala River flows through the Nantahala National Forest.

William Bartram, son to John Bartram, is considered to be "America's first native-born naturalist-illustrator". He journeyed through eight colonies to document the botanical, geographical, and cultural discoveries he made throughout the four years of exploration. At the age of 21, Bartram left home in Philadelphia to live with his uncle at Cape Fear River in North Carolina. His uncle, after being kidnapped as a child, welcomed his nephew to manage the trading post. Shortly after, John Bartram was appointed by King George III to be the royal botanist of the New World in 1765. Both John and William journeyed together to collect plants in South Carolina, Georgia, and Florida.

Following this expedition, Bartram was sponsored by John Fothergill to make a 2,400 miles journey across southeastern America, this being his most memorialized trip. Bartram's work promoted an interest in the region's greenery and significantly contributed to natural history literature. Within the most recent century, Bartram's work has contributed to increased public awareness of environmental preservation.

Bartram Trail was created in his memory in the Nantahala Ranger District, where most of his travels occurred. The trail is not true to his exact path as a result of human development, but the trail spans from North Carolina's Cheoah River to Georgia's Russel Bridge at the Chattooga River. It is said that the most scenic portion of the trail is along Trimont Ridge in the Nantahala Mountains, where it crosses Fishhawk Mountains.

=== Environmental protection ===
==== Late 1800s ====
During this time, Dr. Chase P. Ambler made a vow to protect the western mountains of North Carolina. He created the Appalachian National Park Association and fought to protect the land. His work led him to write to Congress about land preservation in 1901. Congress responded with a $5,000 grant to survey the forest.

Between that time, the Forest Reserve Act was passed by Congress in 1891. Today, it may be known as the U.S. Forest Service, its name originating from President Benjamin Harrison. This act went on to protect national forests in the southeast by having the government purchase land to make them into national forests.

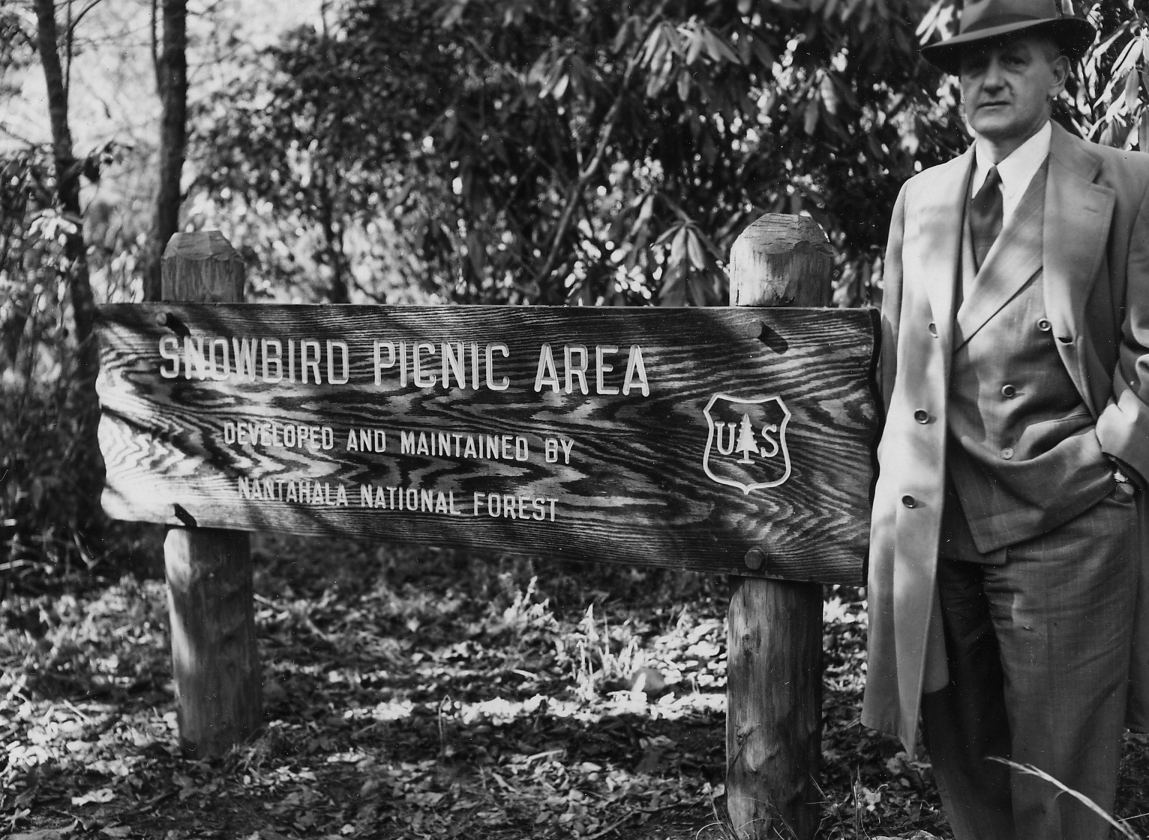
Picnic site in the park, 1937.

==== Early 1900s ====
Following the Forest Reserve Act, the Weeks Act was presented to Congress in hopes to continue preserving forests with government funds being used to purchase both public and private lands. The Weeks Act, named after John Weeks, was signed by President William Taft to protect forests and has been named to be the most successful piece of conservation legislation by protecting over 20 million acres of land.

In previous years, the lands were occupied and abandoned by logging companies. These companies had often stripped the land of its resources before selling to maximize profits and evade taxation. To the government's surprise, they were able to purchase over 850 acres from 359 private owners. However, with many unwilling to sell, private land remains scattered throughout the Nantahala.

January 29, 1920, President Woodrow Wilson made the purchase of combined lands in Georgia, North Carolina, and South Carolina to form the Nantahala National Forest, which was much of the original territories of the Cherokee. This purchase, though, had initially excluded Cherokee, Graham, and Swain countries that President Warren Harding's formed into the Pisgah National Forest in 1921.

Later in 1929, President Herbert Hoover "transferred" lands to expand its boundaries by combining both the Nantahala and Pisgah National Forests. The forest then faced major remapping in 1936.

Nantahala National Forest, Georgia, North Carolina, South Carolina / United States Department of Agriculture, Forest Service

== Geography ==
The terrain varies in elevation from 5,800 feet (1,767.8 m) at Lone Bald in Jackson County, to 1,200 feet (365.8 m) in Cherokee County along the Hiwassee River below the Appalachia Dam. It is the home of many western NC waterfalls. The last part of the Mountain Waters Scenic Byway travels through this forest. The total area under management is 531,270 acres (830.11 sq. mi.; 2,149.97 km^{2}). In descending order of land area it is located in parts of Macon, Graham, Cherokee, Jackson, Clay, Swain and Transylvania counties.

The forest had initially spanned over Georgia, South Carolina, and North Carolina. However, in 1936, the forest was reorganized to follow the state boundaries of North Carolina.

Several areas of old-growth forest have been identified in the Nantahala National Forest, totaling some 30,800 acres (125 km^{2}). The Joyce Kilmer-Slickrock Wilderness in particular contains nearly 6,000 acres (24 km^{2}) of old-growth forest.

=== Within the Nantahala National Forest ===
==== Management ====
The Nantahala National Forest is administered by the United States Forest Service, part of the United States Department of Agriculture. The forest is managed together with the other three North Carolina National Forests (Croatan, Pisgah, and Uwharrie) from common headquarters in Asheville, North Carolina.

===== Cheoah Ranger District =====
The Cheoah Ranger District has 120,110 acres (187.7 sq. mi.; 486.1 km^{2}) in Graham and Swain Counties, and it is headquartered in Robbinsville, North Carolina. The district's name, Cheoah, is the Cherokee word for "otter" because the lands adjoin four large mountain reservoirs and contain numerous streams.

The Appalachian Trail winds through the Cheoah Ranger District after leaving the Nantahala Ranger District on its way to the Great Smoky Mountains National Park. The district also contains the Joyce Kilmer Memorial Forest and part of the Joyce Kilmer-Slickrock Wilderness. The Joyce Kilmer Memorial Forest within the national forest was dedicated on July 30, 1936, to the American poet Joyce Kilmer with trees that are over 450 years old.

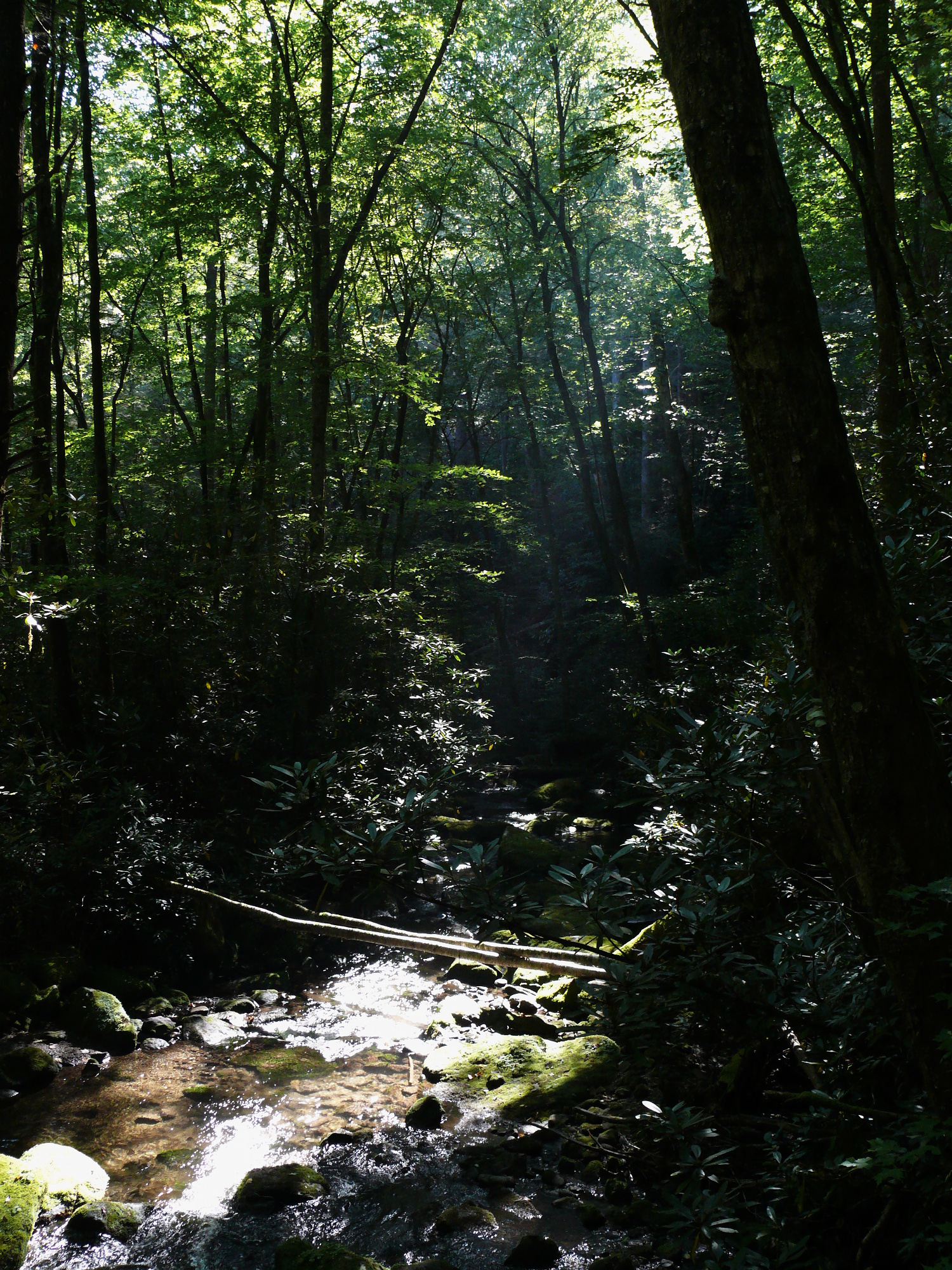
Joyce Kilmer Memorial Forest

===== Nantahala Ranger District =====
The Nantahala Ranger District is the largest of the forest's districts, covering an area of about 250,000 acres (390.6 sq. mi.; 1,011.7 km^{2}) in Macon, Jackson and Swain counties. It was formed in 2007 by consolidating the former Highlands Ranger District and Wayah Ranger District. The headquarters are in Franklin, North Carolina. Part of the district is adjacent to the Cherokee Indian Reservation.

This district's features include the 5,499-foot (1,676.10 m) Standing Indian Mountain, the Nantahala Gorge and Wayah Bald.

Four long distance trails pass through the district: the Appalachian, Bartram, Foothills, and Mountains-to-Sea Trails.

The district contains the 40,000-acre (62.5 sq. mi.; 161.9 km^{2}) Roy Taylor Forest located in Jackson County, southwest of and adjacent to the Blue Ridge Parkway, that it acquired in 1981. The rugged and scenic Tuckasegee Gorge is within the Roy Taylor Forest.

During the consolidation, all the lands of the former Highlands Ranger District within Transylvania County, were transferred to the Pisgah Ranger District.

===== Tusquitee Ranger District =====
The 158,348-acre (247.4 sq. mi.; 640.8 km^{2}) Tusquitee Ranger District is the forest's second-largest district, and it is located in the far southwestern tip of North Carolina, within Cherokee and Clay Counties. Tusquitee is Cherokee for "where the waterdogs laughed," and the district is headquartered in Murphy, North Carolina.

The district's features include the Hiwassee River, Jackrabbit Mountain as well as Lake Chatuge, Hiwassee Lake, Lake Appalachia. All the lakes on or bordering the Tusquitee Ranger District are managed by TVA. The highest point in the district is Tusquitee Bald (5,280 feet (1,609 m)) located in Clay County.

== Wilderness areas and attractions ==
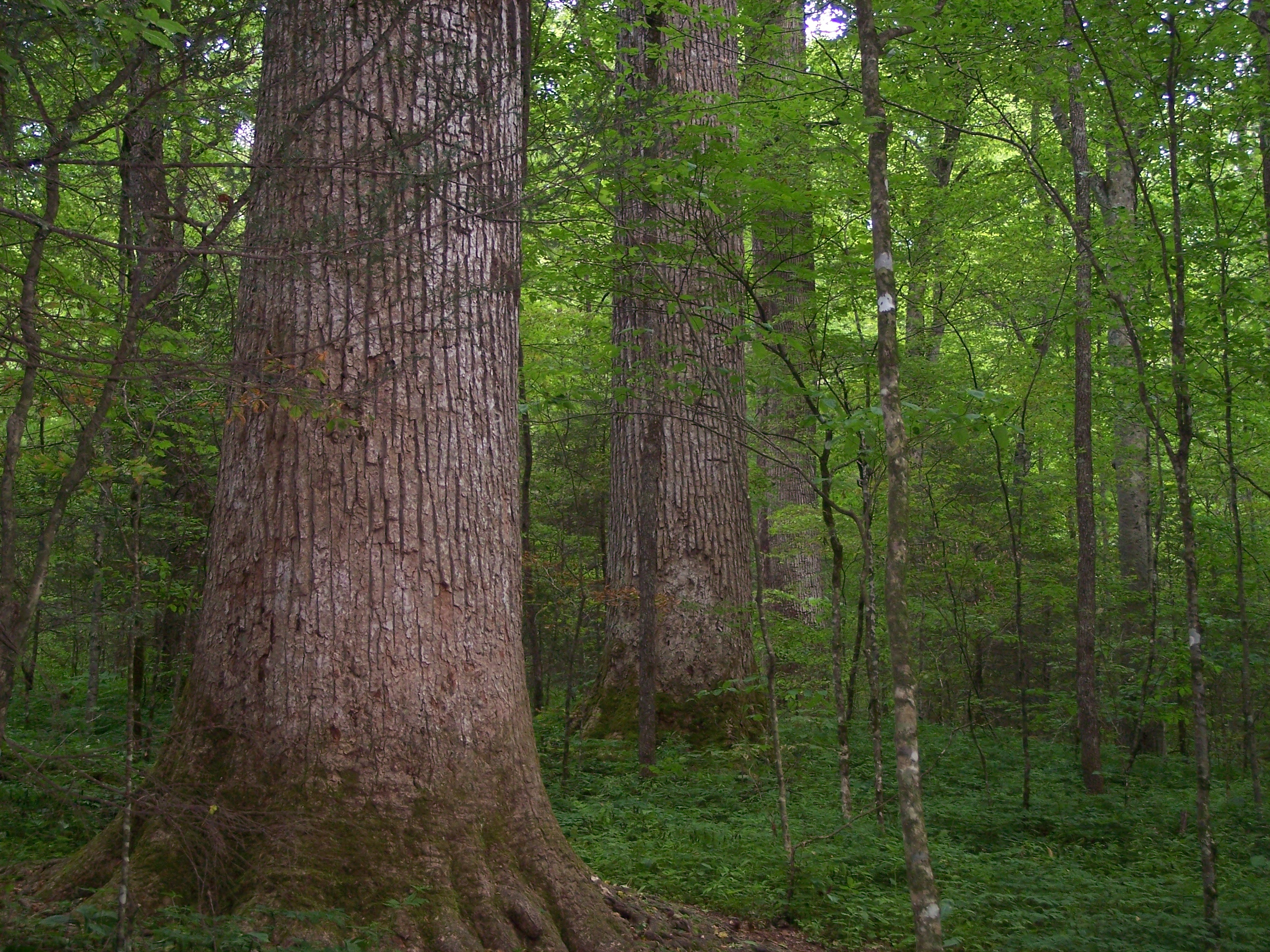
Ancient tulip poplar grove in Joyce Kilmer Memorial Forest.

Three wilderness areas are located within the Nantahala National Forest:

- Ellicott Rock Wilderness is located near Highlands, North Carolina at the intersection of North Carolina, South Carolina, and Georgia state lines, with 3,900 acres (16 km^{2}) in the North Carolina portion.
- The Southern Nantahala Wilderness includes 10,900 acres (17.0 sq. mi.; 44.1 km^{2}) in the North Carolina portion and lies in the Tusquitee and Nantahala Ranger Districts.
- Joyce Kilmer-Slickrock Wilderness which includes another 13,100 acres (53.0 km^{2}) in North Carolina.

These wilderness areas provide an opportunity for solitude in a rugged, natural setting. The Forest manages two Off-Highway Vehicle areas. The most famous being Tellico OHV area located in the Tusquitee Ranger District an additional OHV area is located in the Nantahala Ranger District. Many miles of trout water exist in the forest.

=== Attractions ===
- Appalachian Trail runs between two of North Carolina's national forests: the Great Smoky Mountains National Park and the Nantahala National Forest.
- Bartram Trail has been dedicated to William Bartram and his contribution to the forest's exploration and preservation of history.
- Fires Creek recreation area in Clay County
- Wayah Bald is an intersection of the Appalachian and Bartram Trails. It is known as a historical overlook that was built by the Civilian Conservation Corps.
- Whitewater Falls is the highest east of the Rockies. Its upper falls go down 411 feet, totaling 811 feet.

== See also ==
- List of national forests of the United States
- National Forest Management Act of 1976
