= Macon County, North Carolina =

County in North Carolina, United States

- County
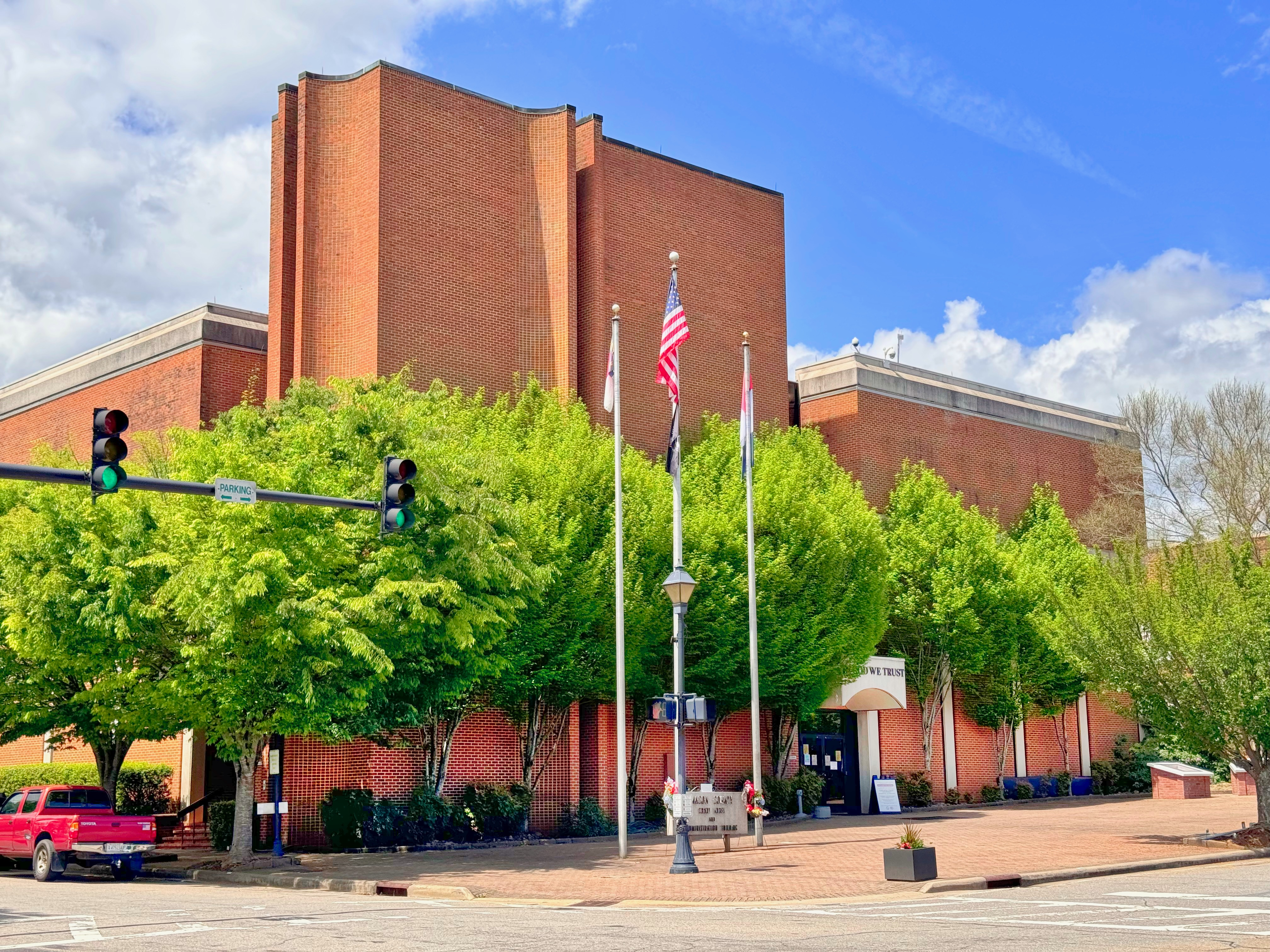
- Macon County Courthouse in Franklin

- Flag Seal

- Location within the U.S. state of North Carolina
- Interactive map of Macon County, North Carolina
- Coordinates: 35.15°N 83.42°W
- Country: United States
- State: North Carolina
- Founded: 1828
- Named for: Nathaniel Macon
- Seat: Franklin
- Largest community: Franklin

Area
  - Total: 519.67 sq mi (1,345.9 km^{2})
  - Land: 515.58 sq mi (1,335.3 km^{2})
  - Water: 4.09 sq mi (10.6 km^{2}) 0.79%

Population (2020)
  - Total: 37,014
  - Estimate (2025): 39,232 ▲
  - Density: 71.79/sq mi (27.72/km^{2})
- Time zone: UTC−5 (Eastern)
  - Summer (DST): UTC−4 (EDT)
- Congressional district: 11th
- Website: maconnc.org

Macon County is a county located in the U.S. state of North Carolina. As of the 2020 census, the population was 37,014. Its county seat is Franklin.

The Nantahala River runs through Macon County, flowing into the Little Tennessee River in Swain County. The Nantahala is one of the most popular whitewater rafting destinations in the nation.

== History ==
The river valleys were long occupied by indigenous peoples, some of whom built earthwork mounds about 1000 AD. Some are still visible in this region. It was part of the homeland of the historic Cherokee people, who had towns throughout the river valleys. The Cherokee in Western North Carolina are known as the Eastern Band of Cherokee Indians, a federally recognized tribe.

The county was formed in 1828 from the western part of Haywood County. It was named for Nathaniel Macon, who represented North Carolina in the United States House of Representatives from 1791 to 1815 (serving as Speaker of the House from 1801 to 1807), and in the United States Senate from 1815 to 1828. Macon County's first courthouse was a brick building constructed by Colonel David Coleman in Franklin in 1829.

In 1839 the western part of Macon County became Cherokee County. In 1851 parts of Macon County and Haywood County were combined to form Jackson County. In 1872, Macon County's Buck Creek and Black Mountain areas became part of Clay County.

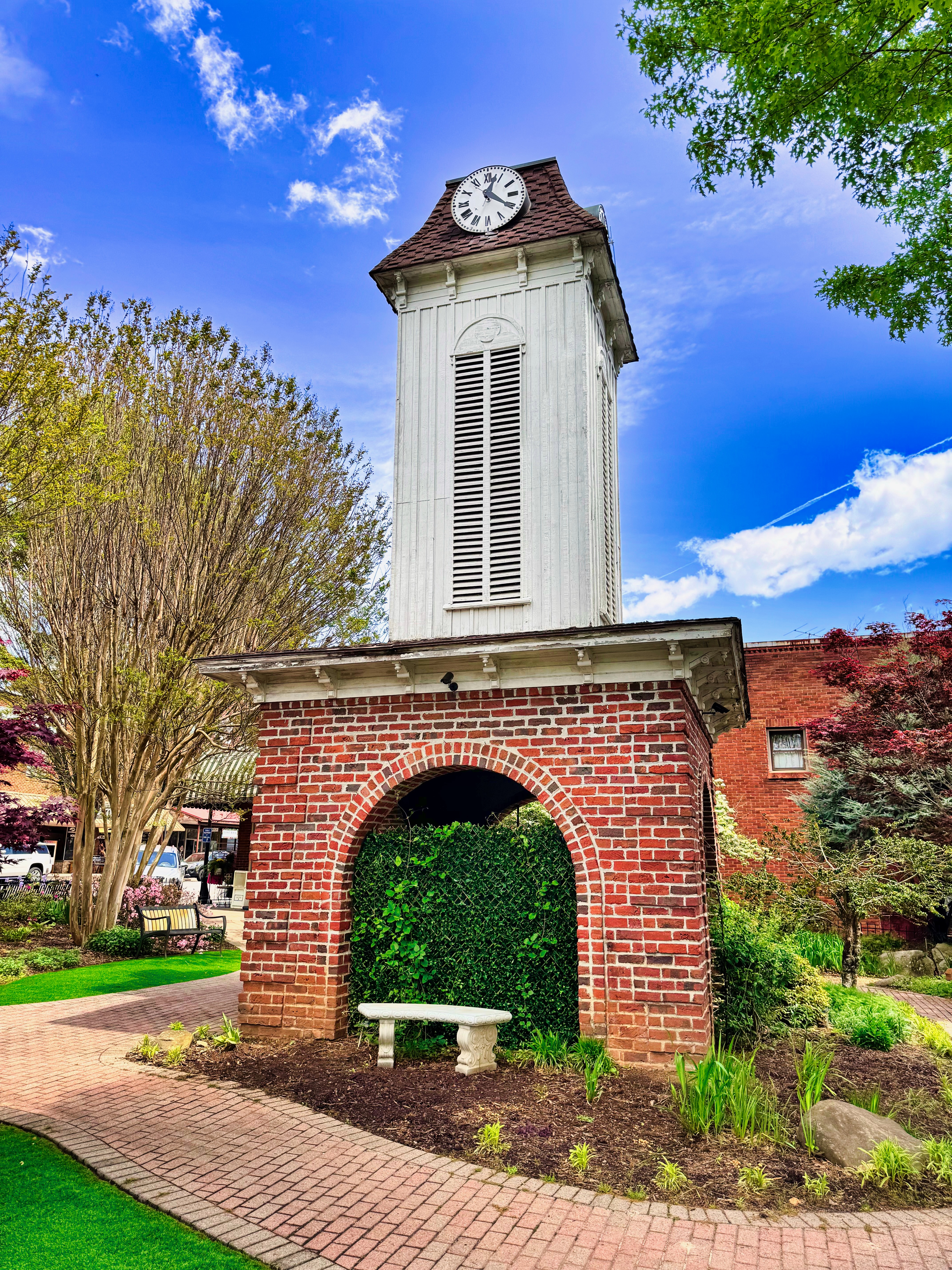
The clock tower of the old Macon County Courthouse (1881–1972)

A new two-story brick courthouse was designed by William Gould Bulgin and constructed by John Davis in 1881. The neighboring Clay County Courthouse was modeled after it. Macon County's historic courthouse was demolished when a new three-story modern neo-formalist courthouse was built in 1972 by architect Kyle C Boone. However, the former courthouse's cupola was saved and remains on display in a downtown park.

Macon County's first hospital opened in Franklin in August 1923. In 1926, the first permanent hospital in North Carolina west of Asheville was built and named Angel Brothers Hospital. It was renamed Angel Hospital in 1940. A new $68 million Angel Medical Center was built east of Franklin in 2022.

Tourism has become a major industry for Macon County. The travel industry employed more than 1,800 people in Macon County as of 2025. As of 2025, visitors spend more than $385 million annually in Macon County. In 2025, Macon County had the second highest growth in visitor spending of any county in North Carolina.

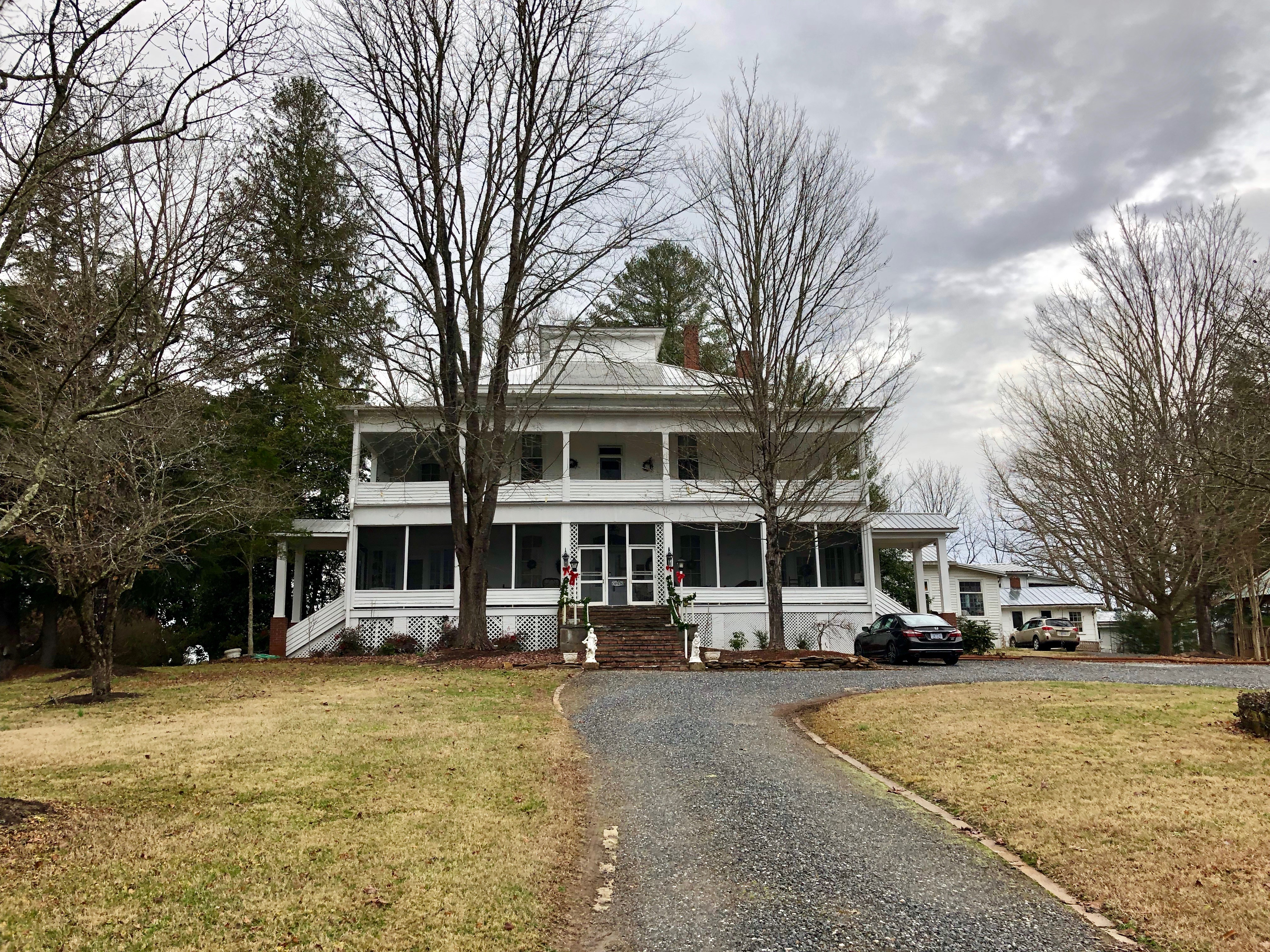
Franklin Terrace Hotel in Franklin

== Geography ==
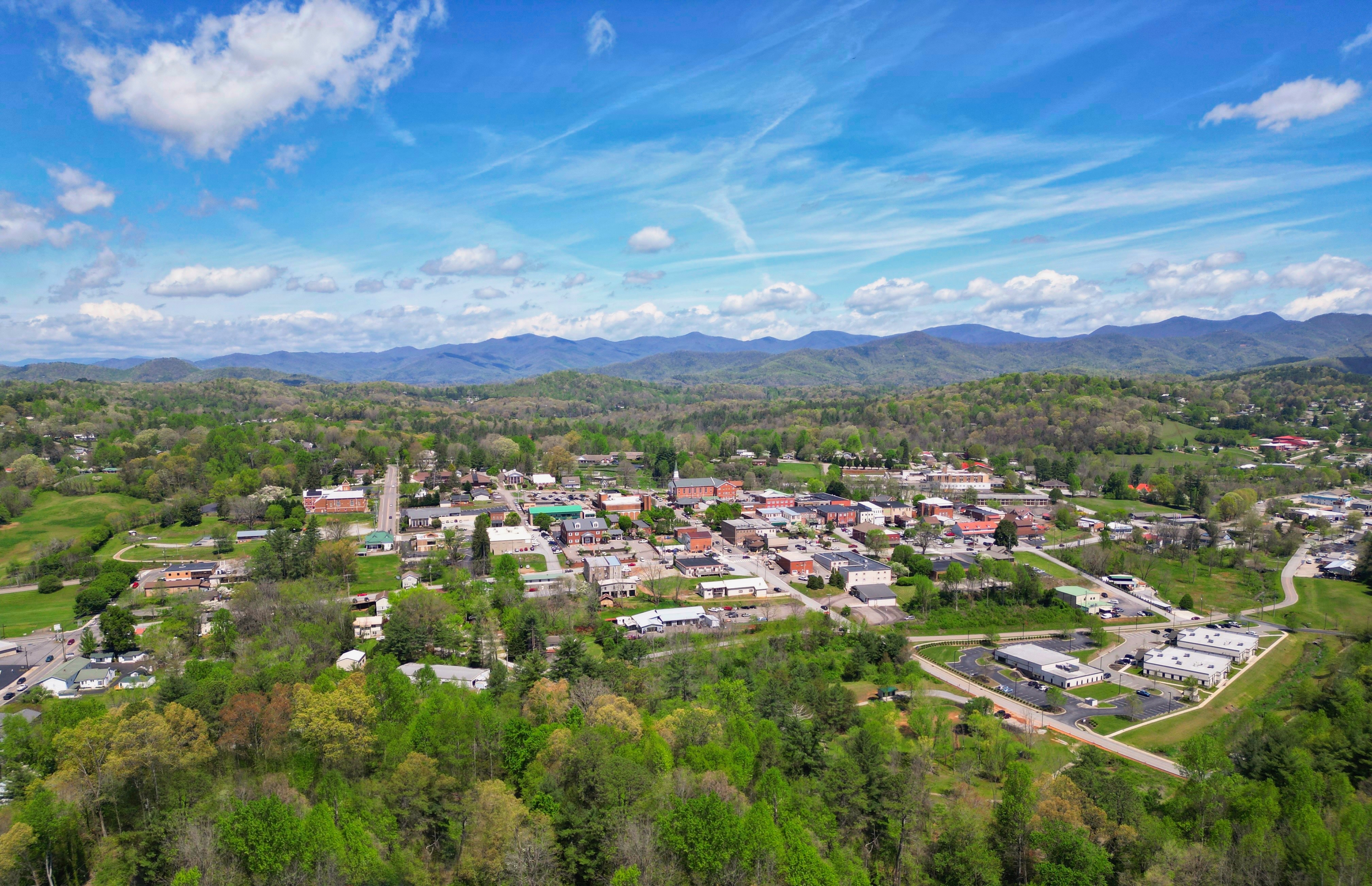
Aerial view of Franklin

According to the U.S. Census Bureau, the county has a total area of 519.67 square miles (1,345.9 km^{2}), of which 515.58 square miles (1,335.3 km^{2}) is land and 4.09 square miles (10.6 km^{2}) (0.79%) is water.

Of the land in Macon County, 239.31 square miles (620 km^{2}) (46.1%) are federal lands that lie within the Nantahala National Forest and are administered by the United States Forest Service. Of the 239.31 square miles (620 km^{2}) of USFS land, 71.56 square miles (185 km^{2}) lie in the Highlands Ranger District and the remaining 167.75 square miles (434 km^{2}) lie in the Wayah Ranger District. The county's largest natural water supply is the Cullasaja River. The Nantahala River also runs through the county, and flows into the Little Tennessee River. The Appalachian Trail winds through the western end of Macon County.

As of 2024, Macon County has 21,973 acres devoted to agriculture, with a total of 346 farms.

=== National protected areas ===
- Appalachian Trail (part)
- Ellicott Rock Wilderness (part)
- Nantahala National Forest (part)

=== State and local protected areas/sites ===
- Euchella Site
- Fires Creek Wildlife Management Area (part)
- Nantahala National Forest Game Land (part)
- Needmore Game Land (part)
- Tessentee Bottomland Preserve

=== Waterfalls ===
==== Cullasaja Falls ====
Cullasaja Falls is a waterfall in Southwestern North Carolina east of Franklin. The waterfall is located on the Cullasaja River in the Nantahala National Forest and is part of the Mountain Waters Scenic Byway. Cullasaja comes from a Cherokee word meaning "honey locust place." The falls is the last major waterfall on the Cullasaja River. The falls is a long cascade over the course of 0.2 miles (300 m). The height of the falls is given as 200 ft (61 m) in Kevin Adams' book, North Carolina Waterfalls and 250 ft (76 m) by NCWaterfalls.com. Google Earth gives a height (based on the elevation of the water at the top of the falls and the elevation of the plunge pool at the bottom of the falls) of 137 ft (42 m).

The falls can be glimpsed from vehicles on the road; however, getting a better view of the falls is not easy. The falls are located beside of a series of blind curves on Highway 64 with sheer rock cliffs above and below the road. There is only one small pull-off near the falls, but walking on the road puts visitors in danger of being hit by a passing vehicle. This water fall is just up the road of the Cullasaja River RV Park.

==== Dry Falls ====
Dry Falls, also known as Upper Cullasaja Falls, is a 65-foot (20 m) waterfall located in the Nantahala National Forest, northwest of Highlands, North Carolina. Dry Falls flows on the Cullasaja River through the Nantahala National Forest. It is part of a series of waterfalls on an 8.7-mile (14.0 km) stretch of the river that eventually ends with Cullasaja Falls. Dry Falls flows over an overhanging bluff that allows visitors to walk up under the falls and remain relatively dry when the water flow is low, hence its name. Visitors will get wet if the water flow is high. The falls has been called Dry Falls for a long time, but has also been known by such names as High Falls, Pitcher Falls, and Cullasaja Falls.

Dry Falls is located on the side of U.S. Highway 64 15.7 miles (25 km) southeast of Franklin, North Carolina and 3.1 miles (5 km) north of Highlands, North Carolina. There is a parking area on the side of the road, where visitors can park before walking the short path with stairs to the falls. Significant improvements to the parking area and trail were completed by the United States Forest Service in 2009.

==== Bridal Veil Falls ====
Bridal Veil Falls is a 45-foot (14 m) waterfall located in the Nantahala National Forest, southeast of Franklin. With a short curve of roadway located behind the falls, it has the distinction of being the only waterfall in the state that one can drive a vehicle under. Bridal Veil Falls flows on a tributary of the Cullasaja River through the Nantahala National Forest. The falls flows over an overhanging bluff; visitors may walk behind the falls and remain dry when the water flow is low. During periods of drought, the stream may nearly dry up, though visitors will get wet if the water flow is moderate or high. To avoid this, visitors may drive behind the falls.

Bridal Veil Falls is located on the side of U.S. Highway 64 16.5 miles (27 km) southeast of Franklin and 2.3 miles (4 km) north of Highlands. Highway 64 originally used the curve of roadway behind the falls exclusively so that all traffic went behind them; however, this caused problems with icing of the roadway during freezing weather. Hwy. 64 has since been re-routed around the front of the falls. There is a parking area on the side of the road, where visitors can park and view the falls as well. In 2003, a massive boulder slid off the left side of the falls, blocking that side of the drive-under completely. However, in July 2007, that boulder was removed by a local developer. The road under the falls is now free of obstruction.

==== Quarry Falls ====
Quarry Falls is a small waterfall (or perhaps large rapid in high water) located beside US Hwy. 64 southeast of Franklin. Known to locals as "Bust Your Butt," it is best known for the large, deep pool at the bottom, and is a popular place for swimming during warm weather.

=== Major water bodies ===
- Beech Creek
- Blazed Creek
- Buck Creek
- Cartoogechaye Creek
- Chattooga River
- Cullasaja River
- Little Laurel Creek
- Little Tennessee River
- Middle Creek
- Nantahala Lake
- Nantahala River
- Queens Creek
- Tallulah River
- Tessentee Creek

=== Adjacent counties ===
- Swain County – north
- Jackson County – east
- Oconee County, South Carolina – southeast
- Rabun County, Georgia – south
- Clay County – southwest
- Cherokee County – west
- Graham County – northwest

=== Major highways ===
- US 23
- US 64
- US 64 Truck
- US 441
- US 441 Bus.
- NC 28
- NC 106

=== Major infrastructure ===
- Macon County Airport

== Demographics ==
Historical population
Census	Pop.	Note	%±
1830	5,333		—
1840	4,869		−8.7%
1850	6,389		31.2%
1860	6,004		−6.0%
1870	6,615		10.2%
1880	8,064		21.9%
1890	10,102		25.3%
1900	12,104		19.8%
1910	12,191		0.7%
1920	12,887		5.7%
1930	13,672		6.1%
1940	15,880		16.1%
1950	16,174		1.9%
1960	14,935		−7.7%
1970	15,788		5.7%
1980	20,178		27.8%
1990	23,499		16.5%
2000	29,811		26.9%
2010	33,922		13.8%
2020	37,014		9.1%
2025 (est.)	39,232	▲	6.0%
U.S. Decennial Census; 1790–1960 1900–1990; 1990–2000 2010 2020

Macon County's jobless rate is 3.4 percent as of 2025.

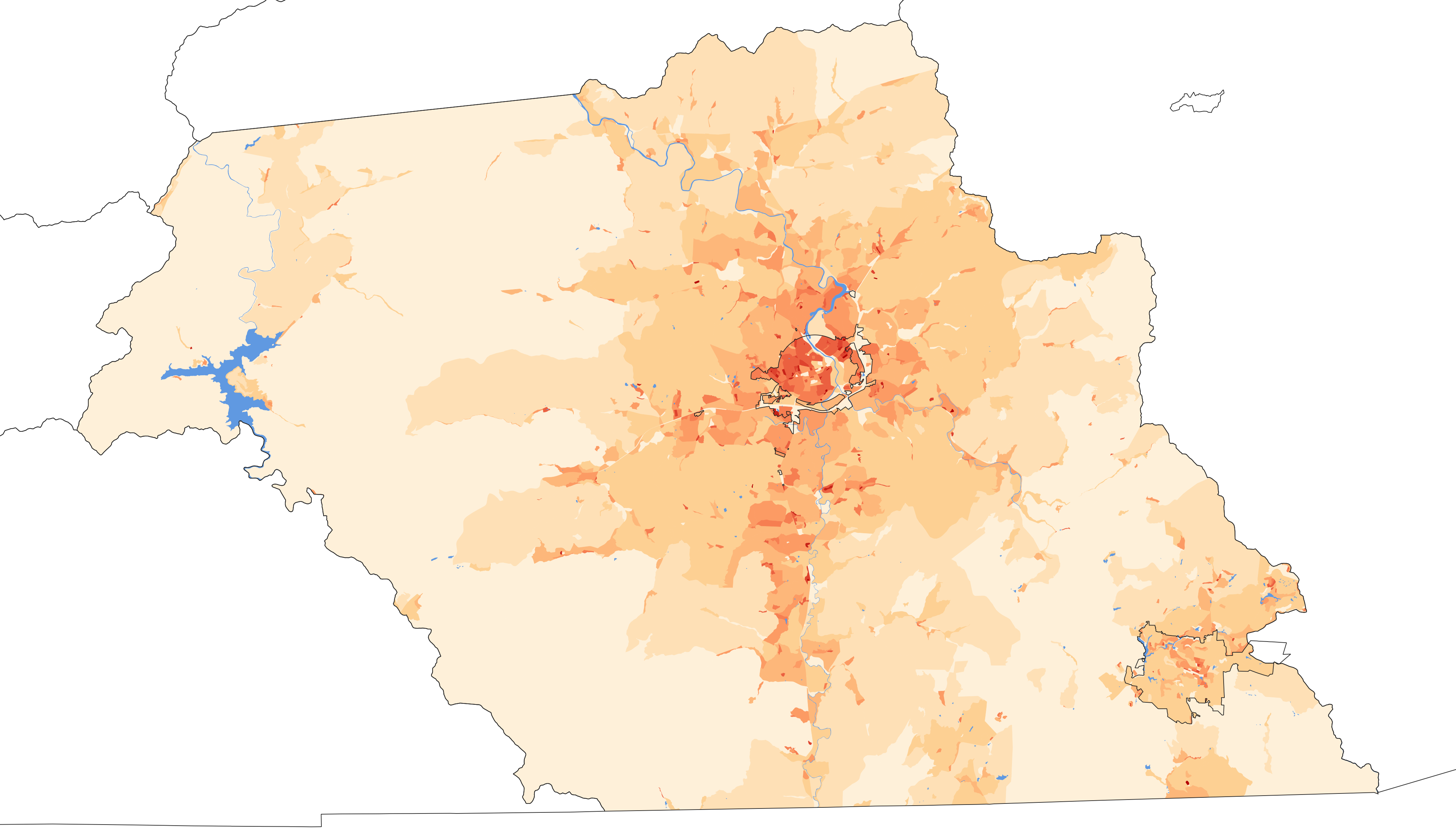
2020 population density of Macon County NC by census block

=== 2020 census ===
As of the 2020 census, there were 37,014 people, 16,379 households, and 10,250 families residing in the county; the median age was 50.9 years, 18.0% of residents were under the age of 18, 29.5% were 65 years of age or older, for every 100 females there were 94.8 males, and for every 100 females age 18 and over there were 92.6 males age 18 and over.

Of the 16,379 households, 21.9% had children under the age of 18 living in them, 49.3% were married-couple households, 17.7% were households with a male householder and no spouse or partner present, and 27.3% were households with a female householder and no spouse or partner present; 31.6% of all households were made up of individuals and 17.6% had someone living alone who was 65 years of age or older.

There were 26,948 housing units, of which 39.2% were vacant. Among occupied housing units, 76.5% were owner-occupied and 23.5% were renter-occupied. The homeowner vacancy rate was 2.9% and the rental vacancy rate was 12.5%.

The racial makeup of the county was 86.7% White, 0.7% Black or African American, 0.8% American Indian and Alaska Native, 0.7% Asian, <0.1% Native Hawaiian and Pacific Islander, 4.8% from some other race, and 6.3% from two or more races; Hispanic or Latino residents of any race comprised 9.5% of the population.

25.3% of residents lived in urban areas, while 74.7% lived in rural areas.

=== Racial and ethnic composition ===
Macon County, North Carolina – Racial and ethnic composition Note: the US Census treats Hispanic/Latino as an ethnic category. This table excludes Latinos from the racial categories and assigns them to a separate category. Hispanics/Latinos may be of any race.
Race / Ethnicity (NH = Non-Hispanic)	Pop 1980	Pop 1990	Pop 2000	Pop 2010	Pop 2020	% 1980	% 1990	% 2000	% 2010	% 2020
White alone (NH)	19,629	22,818	28,628	30,599	31,535	97.28%	97.10%	96.03%	90.20%	85.20%
Black or African American alone (NH)	381	384	353	419	252	1.89%	1.63%	1.18%	1.24%	0.68%
Native American or Alaska Native alone (NH)	25	73	79	143	167	0.12%	0.31%	0.27%	0.42%	0.45%
Asian alone (NH)	19	58	117	201	250	0.09%	0.25%	0.39%	0.59%	0.68%
Native Hawaiian or Pacific Islander alone (NH)	x	x	4	3	6	x	x	0.01%	0.01%	0.02%
Other race alone (NH)	13	1	11	28	103	0.06%	0.00%	0.04%	0.08%	0.28%
Mixed race or Multiracial (NH)	x	x	165	299	1,203	x	x	0.55%	0.88%	3.25%
Hispanic or Latino (any race)	111	165	454	2,230	3,498	0.55%	0.70%	1.52%	6.57%	9.45%
Total	20,178	23,499	29,811	33,922	37,014	100.00%	100.00%	100.00%	100.00%	100.00%

=== 2000 census ===
At the 2000 census, there were 29,811 people, 12,828 households, and 8,902 families residing in the county. The population density was 58 people per square mile (22 people/km^{2}). There were 20,746 housing units at an average density of 40 units per square mile (15 units/km^{2}). The racial makeup of the county was 97.18% White, 1.20% Black or African American, 0.28% Native American, 0.39% Asian, 0.02% Pacific Islander, 0.31% from other races, and 0.63% from two or more races. 1.52% of the population were Hispanic or Latino of any race.

There were 12,828 households, out of which 24.80% had children under the age of 18 living with them, 58.50% were married couples living together, 8.00% had a female householder with no husband present, and 30.60% were non-families. 27.00% of all households were made up of individuals, and 13.60% had someone living alone who was 65 years of age or older. The average household size was 2.28 and the average family size was 2.74.

In the county, the population was spread out, with 20.30% under the age of 18, 6.10% from 18 to 24, 23.20% from 25 to 44, 27.90% from 45 to 64, and 22.40% who were 65 years of age or older. The median age was 45 years. For every 100 females there were 92.10 males. For every 100 females age 18 and over, there were 88.40 males.

The median income for a household in the county was $32,139, and the median income for a family was $37,381. Males had a median income of $28,113 versus $20,081 for females. The per capita income for the county was $18,642. About 8.80% of families and 12.60% of the population were below the poverty line, including 16.00% of those under age 18 and 11.80% of those age 65 or over.

== Law, government, public safety ==
=== Government ===
Macon County is governed by its elected Board of Commissioners and administered by the Board's appointed County Manager. Macon County is a member of the regional Southwestern Commission council of governments. As of 2024, Macon County has the lowest property tax rate in North Carolina – 27 cents per $100.

United States presidential election results for Macon County, North Carolina
Year	Republican		Democratic		Third party(ies)	
Year	No.	%	No.	%	No.	%
1912	134	6.72%	1,020	51.13%	841	42.16%
1916	1,069	48.26%	1,146	51.74%	0	0.00%
1920	2,050	48.50%	2,177	51.50%	0	0.00%
1924	2,015	47.85%	2,178	51.72%	18	0.43%
1928	2,903	56.99%	2,191	43.01%	0	0.00%
1932	2,307	41.49%	3,223	57.97%	30	0.54%
1936	2,554	43.55%	3,311	56.45%	0	0.00%
1940	2,312	44.01%	2,941	55.99%	0	0.00%
1944	2,510	46.78%	2,855	53.22%	0	0.00%
1948	2,388	44.98%	2,785	52.46%	136	2.56%
1952	3,327	49.49%	3,396	50.51%	0	0.00%
1956	3,408	52.98%	3,025	47.02%	0	0.00%
1960	3,735	54.66%	3,098	45.34%	0	0.00%
1964	2,900	43.45%	3,774	56.55%	0	0.00%
1968	3,295	50.48%	2,070	31.71%	1,162	17.80%
1972	4,134	69.20%	1,749	29.28%	91	1.52%
1976	3,673	45.25%	4,406	54.27%	39	0.48%
1980	4,727	52.34%	4,105	45.45%	199	2.20%
1984	6,661	64.95%	3,570	34.81%	25	0.24%
1988	6,026	61.39%	3,773	38.44%	17	0.17%
1992	4,797	42.53%	4,624	41.00%	1,858	16.47%
1996	5,267	49.34%	4,209	39.43%	1,199	11.23%
2000	8,406	63.52%	4,683	35.39%	145	1.10%
2004	9,448	62.89%	5,489	36.53%	87	0.58%
2008	10,317	59.85%	6,620	38.40%	301	1.75%
2012	10,835	64.26%	5,712	33.88%	314	1.86%
2016	12,127	68.38%	4,876	27.50%	731	4.12%
2020	14,211	68.51%	6,230	30.03%	302	1.46%
2024	14,981	68.30%	6,675	30.43%	278	1.27%

=== Public safety ===
==== Sheriff and municipal police ====
The Macon County Sheriff's Office provides court security, jail administration, and protection of all county owned facilities for all of Macon county plus patrol and detective services for the unincorporated parts of the county. Incorporated towns Franklin, pop 3,845, and Highlands. population 924, have municipal police departments. When requested, assistance is available from the North Carolina State Bureau of Investigation, SBI.

==== Fire and Emergency services ====
Macon County Emergency Services oversees contracts with the eleven volunteer fire departments that provide protection to Macon County residents and businesses and also provides for fire inspections. Macon County has a fire prevention ordinance enforceable by civil and criminal penalties.

== Education ==
=== Franklin High School ===
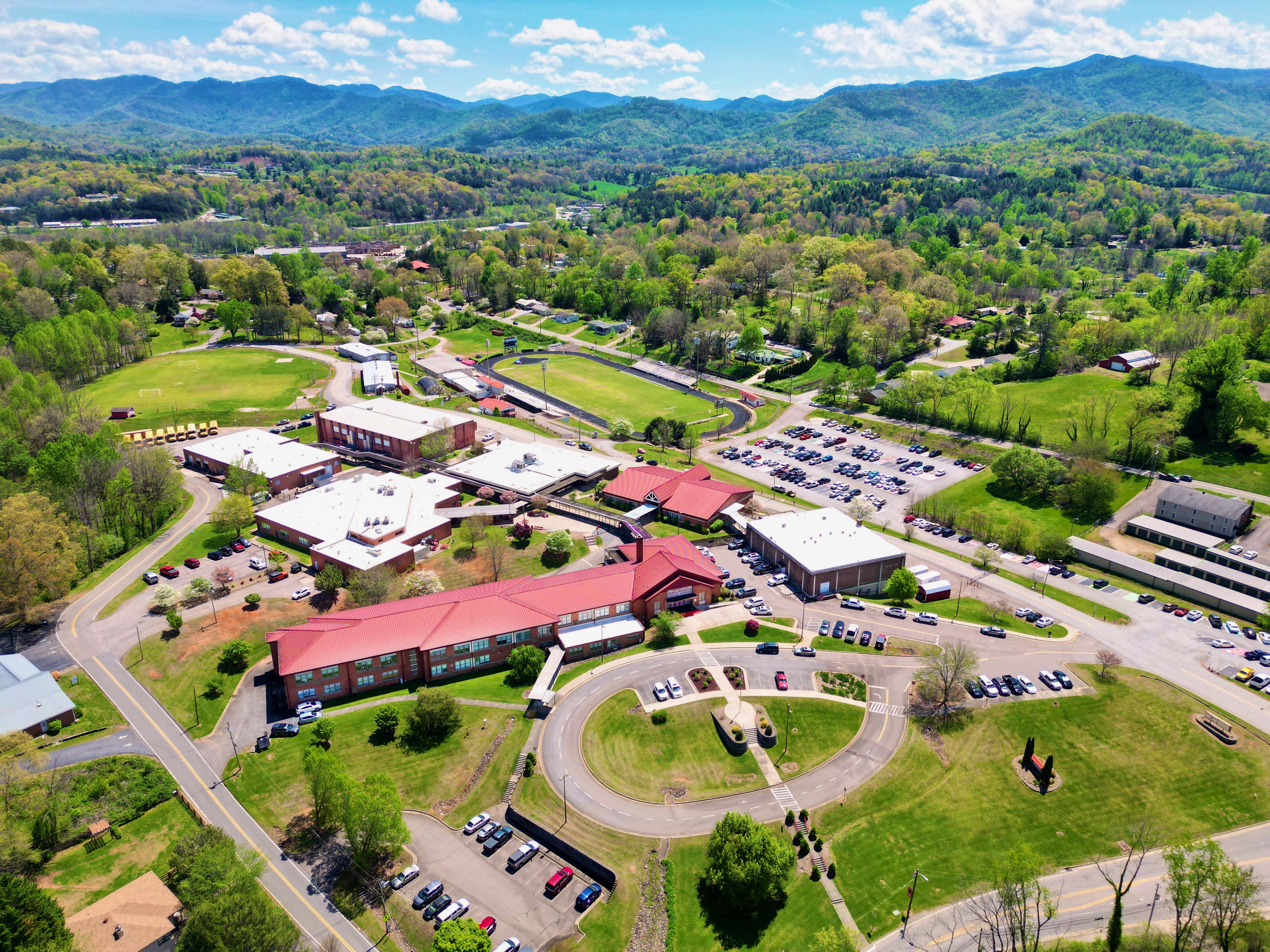
Franklin High School

Franklin High School is a public high school serving grades 9–12, and is a part of the Macon County Schools district.

=== Union Academy ===
Union Academy is an alternative public school in Macon County, North Carolina for grades 6–12. It is located near the South Macon Elementary school. Its name was changed from Union Alternative in 2006.

=== Macon Early College ===
Macon Early College is a high school that offers college classes located next to the greenway and public library of Franklin. Southwestern Community College (North Carolina) is a partner in the program. As of 2008, SCC was ranked 4th in the list of America's best community colleges. Macon Early College is one of the three high schools in the Macon area, coming into existence after the Franklin High School, but before the Union Academy.

== Media ==
The Franklin Press has been published weekly in Franklin since 1888. It is the oldest extant business in Macon County. The Press was preceded by four other Macon County newspapers: The Franklin Observer and The Western Carolinian (both of which began in 1860), the Macon Advance (started in 1877), and The Western Reporter (1880-1881). None of them lasted more than a few years.

Highlands has been served by The Highlander newspaper since 1958. It was preceded by a newspaper of the same name that began in 1885 and ceased publication in 1887 due to financial hardship.

== Communities ==
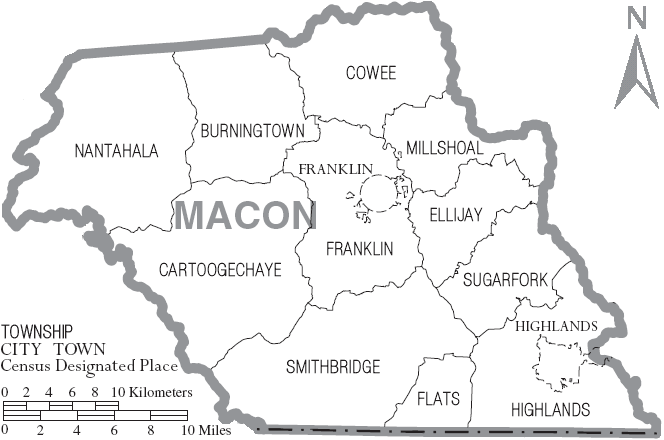
Map of Macon County with municipal and township labels

=== Towns ===
- Franklin (county seat and largest community)
- Highlands

=== Unincorporated communities ===
- Aquone
- Cullasaja
- Etna
- Gneiss
- Holly Springs
- Iotla
- Kyle
- Leatherman
- Oak Grove
- Otto
- Peek's Creek
- Prentiss
- Rainbow Springs
- Scaly Mountain
- West's Mill

=== Townships ===
- Burningtown
- Cartoogechaye
- Cowee
- Ellijay
- Flats
- Franklin
- Highlands
- Millshoal
- Nantahala
- Smithbridge (formerly Smith's Bridge)
- Sugarfork

== See also ==
- List of counties in North Carolina
- National Register of Historic Places listings in Macon County, North Carolina
