= Bryson City Depot =

Train station in Bryson City, North Carolina, U.S.

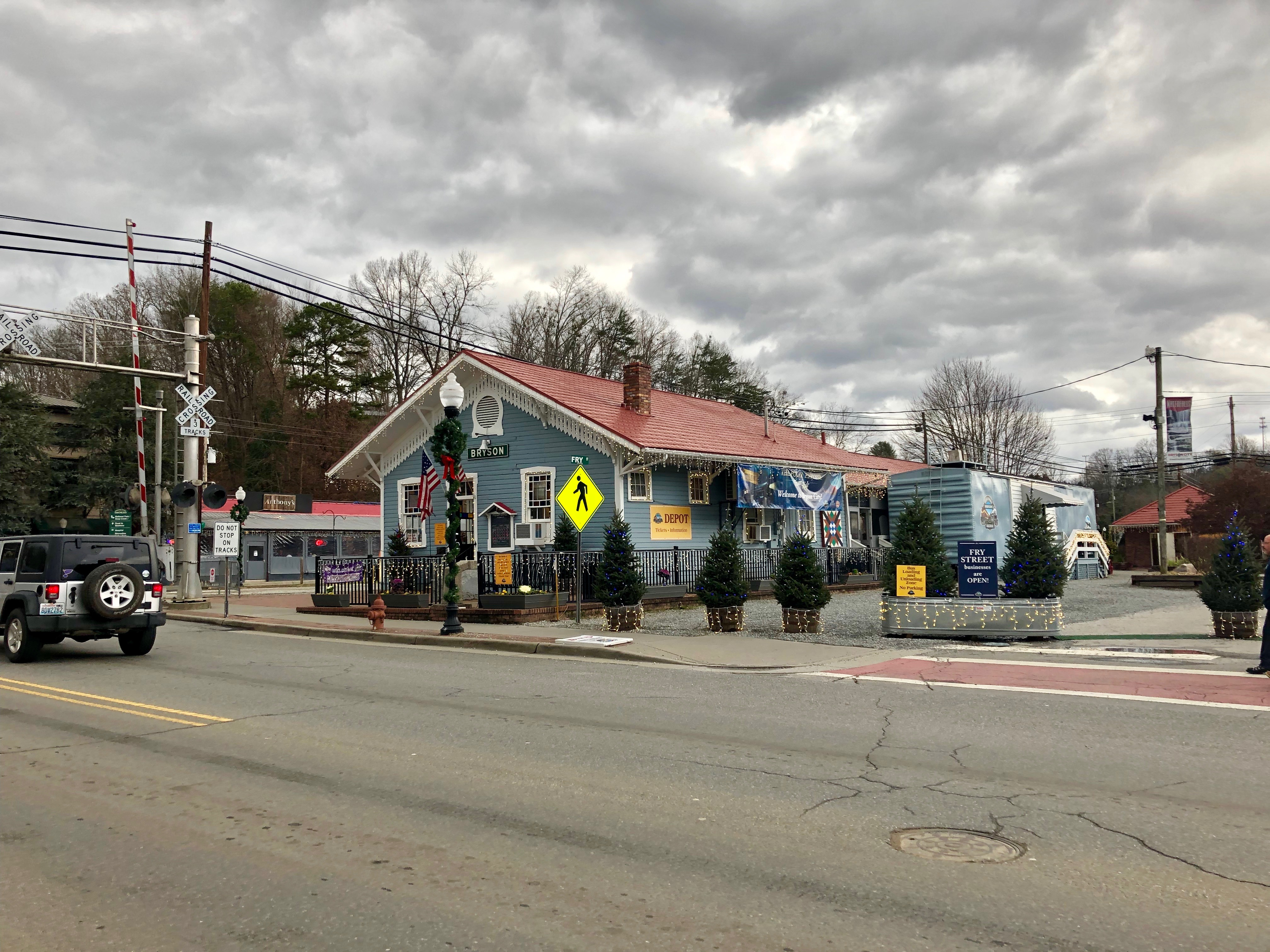

General information
- Location: 226 Everett Street; Bryson City, North Carolina; United States
- Coordinates: 35.4304°N 83.4469°W
- Owner: Great Smoky Mountains Railroad
- Line: Murphy Branch
- Platforms: 1 side platform
- Tracks: 3

Construction
- Structure type: At-grade
- Parking: Yes; paid
- Accessible: Yes
- Architect: J. D. Elliott

History
- Opened: 1895
- Rebuilt: 1988
- Original company: Southern Railway

Passengers
- Roughly 200,000 a year

Former services
Preceding station	Southern Railway	Following station
Bushnell toward Murphy	Murphy Branch	Whittier toward Asheville
Location

The Bryson City Depot is a train station located in Bryson City, North Carolina, United States. It serves as the only active station along the Murphy Branch, a rail line that traverses from Asheville to Murphy in Western North Carolina. Owned and operated by the Great Smoky Mountains Railroad, it serves as both the begin and end point of various scenic excursion trains.

== Location ==
Bryson City Depot is located at the intersection of Everett and Fry streets in downtown Bryson City. Adjacent to the station is MacNeill Park, dedicated to Malcolm and Joan MacNeill, who established the Great Smoky Mountains Railway. Nearby, within walking distance, is the Smoky Mountain Trains Museum, the Appalachian Rivers Aquarium, the Swain County Heritage Museum, the Fly Fishing Museum of the Southern Appalachians, Riverfront Park, and Island Park.

== History ==
In November 1894, Southern Railway had contracted J. D. Elliott of Hickory to build a depot in Bryson City. A frame building with wooden ornament and broad eaves was completed in 1895. Around the turn of the 20th century, four passenger trains, between Asheville and Murphy, would daily stop at the station. However, soon after the Second World War, passenger traffic had declined due to increasing prevalence of the automobile. On July 16, 1948, passenger rail service was discontinued along the Murphy Branch and the station was closed.

In 1988, the State of North Carolina purchased the Murphy Branch from Norfolk Southern, the successor of Southern Railway, after the line was abandoned for lack of freight traffic. The Great Smoky Mountains Railroad, which was formed that same year, secured a lease agreement along 53 miles (85 km) of track between Dillsboro and Andrews. The station was refurbished and began its second life serving tourists to the area.

== Services ==
The train station, operated by the Great Smoky Mountains Railroad, provides round-trip excursions through the Nantahala Gorge and along the Tuckasegee River. Seasonal and themed round-trip excursions, including the Polar Express, are also available. Tickets and information are located in the depot, while public restrooms are located at an adjacent stand-alone building. Operating hours will vary depending on scheduled excursions planned for day.

Short-term and disability parking is available along Everett and Fry streets (free, two-hour limit). Same-day parking is located at 45 Mitchell Street, which requires a cash-only fee per vehicle (including motorcycle and RV).
