= Hyatt House =

Hyatt House or The Hyatt House may refer to:

- Hyatt House, the name of a chain of extended stay hotels from Hyatt (formerly Hyatt Summerfield Suites and Hotel Sierra)
- Hyatt House, the world's first fly-in (airport) hotel, in Los Angeles, California, conceptualized and built by Jack D. Crouch, basis for the Hyatt hotel chain.
- Other Hyatt hotels, such as:
  - Andaz West Hollywood, also known as Continental Hyatt House
  - Hyatt Regency Atlanta, also known as Regency Hyatt House
  - Purple Hotel in Illinois, also known as the Hyatt House Hotel
  - Hyatt Regency San Francisco Airport, originally opened as Hyatt House Hotel, Burlingame
  - The Hyatt House Hotel, Hyattstown, Maryland. A historic property built in 1804 operated as a hotel, a general store and presently a private residence.

Or it may refer to:

in the United Kingdom

- Hyatt House, Gloucester, England, (or "Hyett House"), probably built in the 16th century.

in the United States

- Thomas Hyatt House, Ridgefield, Connecticut, listed on the National Register of Historic Places (NRHP) in Fairfield County
- Norwood-Hyatt House, Gloucester, Massachusetts, NRHP-listed
- Hyatt-Livingston House, Dobbs Ferry, New York, NRHP-listed in Westchester County
- Caleb Hyatt House, Scarsdale, New York, NRHP-listed in Westchester County
- Abel Hyatt House, Bryson City, North Carolina, NRHP-listed in Swain County
