= Abel Hyatt House =

Historic house in North Carolina, United States

- U.S. National Register of Historic Places
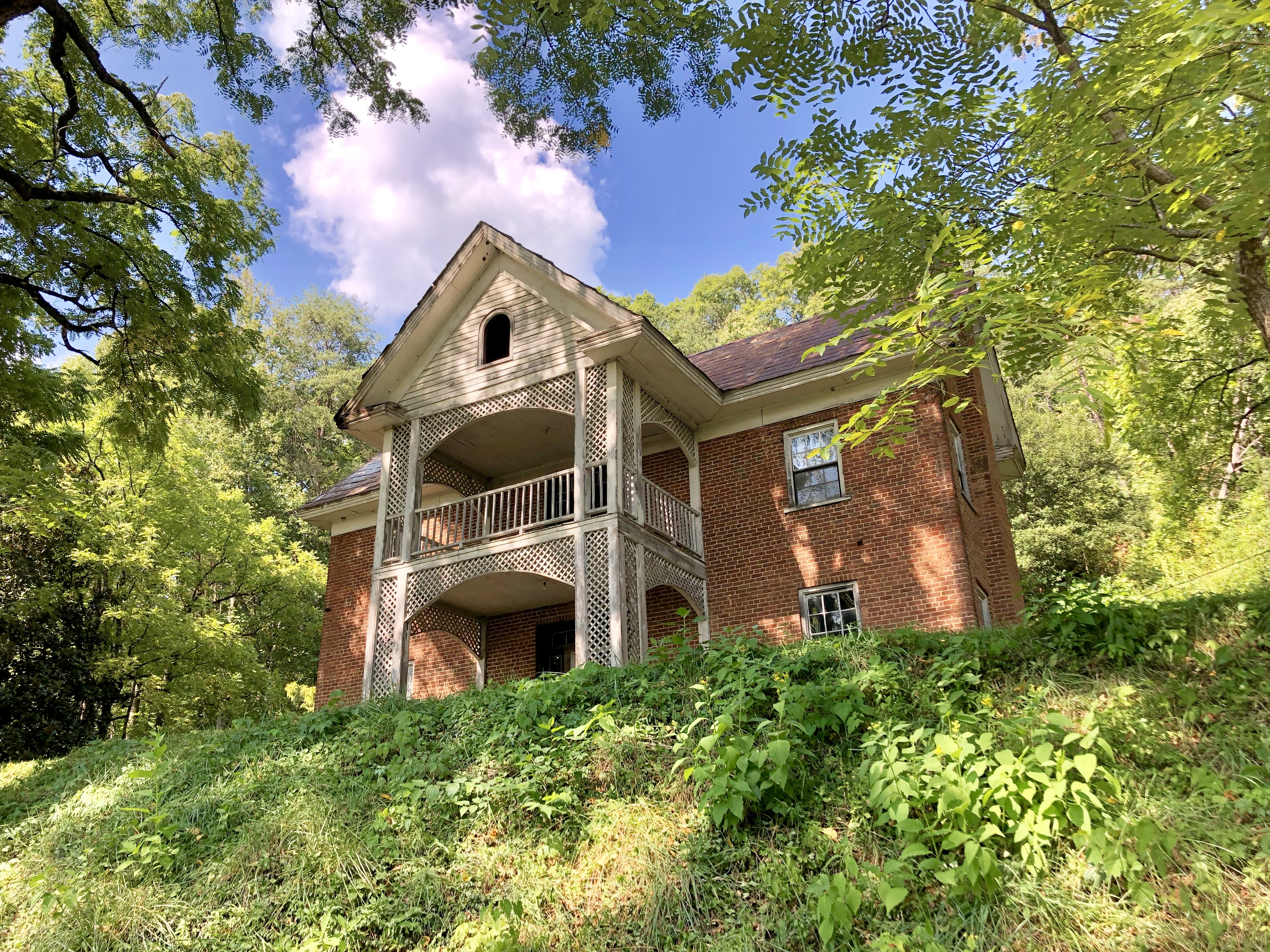
- Principal Facade, Abel Hyatt House

- Location within North Carolina Location within the United States
- Location: Eastern side of NC 1168, 0.2 miles north of its junction with NC 1191, near Bryson City, North Carolina
- Coordinates: 35°26′14″N 83°23′48″W
- Area: 24.5 acres (9.9 ha)
- Built: 1880
- Built by: Welch, Manus; Buchanan, Yhad
- Architectural style: Greek Revival, I-house
- NRHP reference No.: 91000340
- Added to NRHP: March 22, 1991

The Abel Hyatt House is a historic house in rural Swain County, North Carolina. It is located about 3 miles (4.8 km) east of Bryson City, 300 yards (270 m) east of Highway 74, on the banks of the Tuckasegee River. The two-story brick I-house was built in 1880 by Abel Hyatt, a farmer, and is the only known 19th-century masonry house in the county. It is a fine example of vernacular Greek Revival style.

The house was listed on the National Register of Historic Places in 1991.

== See also ==
- National Register of Historic Places listings in Swain County, North Carolina
