= Randolph House =

Randolph House may refer to:

- Randolph House (Philadelphia, Pennsylvania), also known as Laurel Hill Mansion
- Peyton Randolph House, Williamsburg, Virginia
- William Randolph House, Cross Plains, Tennessee
- Randolph House (Memphis, Tennessee), listed on the National Register of Historic Places in Shelby County
- Randolph W. House (born 1945), United States Army general

== See also ==
- Virginia Randolph Cottage, Glen Allen, Virginia
- Ephraim Fitz-Randolph House, Piscataway, New Jersey
- Frye-Randolph House and Fryemont Inn, Bryson City, North Carolina
- Fitz Randolph–Rogers House, Hamilton, Ohio
- Randolph-Whittle House, Macon, Georgia, listed on the National Register of Historic Places in Bibb County
- Dr. Fredrich A. Randolph Block, Sioux Falls, South Dakota, listed on the NRHP in Minnehaha County
