= National Register of Historic Places listings in Swain County, North Carolina =

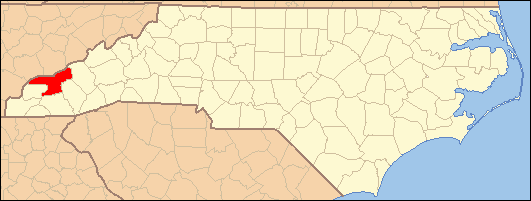

This list includes properties and districts listed on the National Register of Historic Places in Swain County, North Carolina. Click the "Map of all coordinates" link to the right to view an online map of all properties and districts with latitude and longitude coordinates in the table below.

== Current listings ==
This National Park Service list is complete through NPS recent listings posted March 14, 2025.

	Name on the Register	Image	Date listed	Location	City or town	Description
1	Blue Ridge Parkway	Blue Ridge Parkway	December 13, 2024 (#100011353)	Blue Ridge Parkway through Virginia and North Carolina; 35°30′44″N 83°17′39″W	Cherokee vicinity	
2	Cheoah Hydroelectric Development	Cheoah Hydroelectric Development	May 21, 2004 (#04000464)	1512 Tapoca Rd., NC 129; 35°27′00″N 83°56′10″W	Robbinsville	Extends into Graham County
3	Clingmans Dome Observation Tower	Clingmans Dome Observation Tower	August 15, 2012 (#12000515)	Terminus of Clingmans Dome Rd. 35°33′46″N 83°29′55″W	Bryson City	Extends into Sevier County, Tennessee
4	Frye-Randolph House and Fryemont Inn	Frye-Randolph House and Fryemont Inn	February 18, 1983 (#83001919)	Fryemont Rd. 35°25′29″N 83°26′42″W	Bryson City	
5	Governors Island	Governors Island	June 4, 1973 (#73002239)	U.S. Route 19 east of Bryson City; 35°26′13″N 83°24′16″W	Bryson City	Also known as "Kituhwa"
6	Hall Cabin	Hall Cabin	January 30, 1976 (#76000162)	15 miles northeast of Fontana in Great Smoky Mountains National Park; 35°31′12″N 83°40′46″W	Fontana	Also known as the J.H. Kress Cabin
7	Abel Hyatt House	Abel Hyatt House	March 22, 1991 (#91000340)	Eastern side of NC 1168, 0.2 miles north of its junction with NC 1191; 35°26′15″N 83°23′47″W	Bryson City	
8	Mingus Mill	Mingus Mill	November 29, 2016 (#16000808)	Newfound Gap Rd., Great Smoky Mountains National Park; 35°31′12″N 83°18′35″W	Cherokee	
9	Nununyi Mound and Village Site		January 22, 1980 (#80002901)	Between Acquoni Rd. and the Oconaluftee River, north of Cherokee; 35°29′40″N 83°18′39″W	Cherokee	Site 31SW3
10	Oconaluftee Archeological District		February 19, 1982 (#82001715)	Address Restricted	Cherokee	
11	Oconaluftee Baptist Church	Oconaluftee Baptist Church	January 1, 1976 (#76000163)	6 miles north of Cherokee on U.S. Route 441 in Great Smoky Mountains National Park; 35°33′13″N 83°18′31″W	Cherokee	Part of Smokemont ghost town
12	Oconaluftee Ranger Station	Oconaluftee Ranger Station	November 29, 2016 (#16000809)	Newfound Gap Rd., Great Smoky Mountains National Park; 35°30′47″N 83°18′23″W	Cherokee	
13	Swain County Courthouse	Swain County Courthouse	May 10, 1979 (#79001752)	Main and Fry Sts. 35°25′40″N 83°26′44″W	Bryson City	

== See also ==
- National Register of Historic Places listings in North Carolina
- List of National Historic Landmarks in North Carolina
