= Thomas Hyatt =

Thomas Hyatt may refer to:

- Thomas Hyatt (New York City), member of the 46th and 47th New York State Legislatures
- Tommy Hyatt, fictional character

== See also ==
- Thomas Hyatt House
