= Frye-Randolph House and Fryemont Inn =

- U.S. National Register of Historic Places
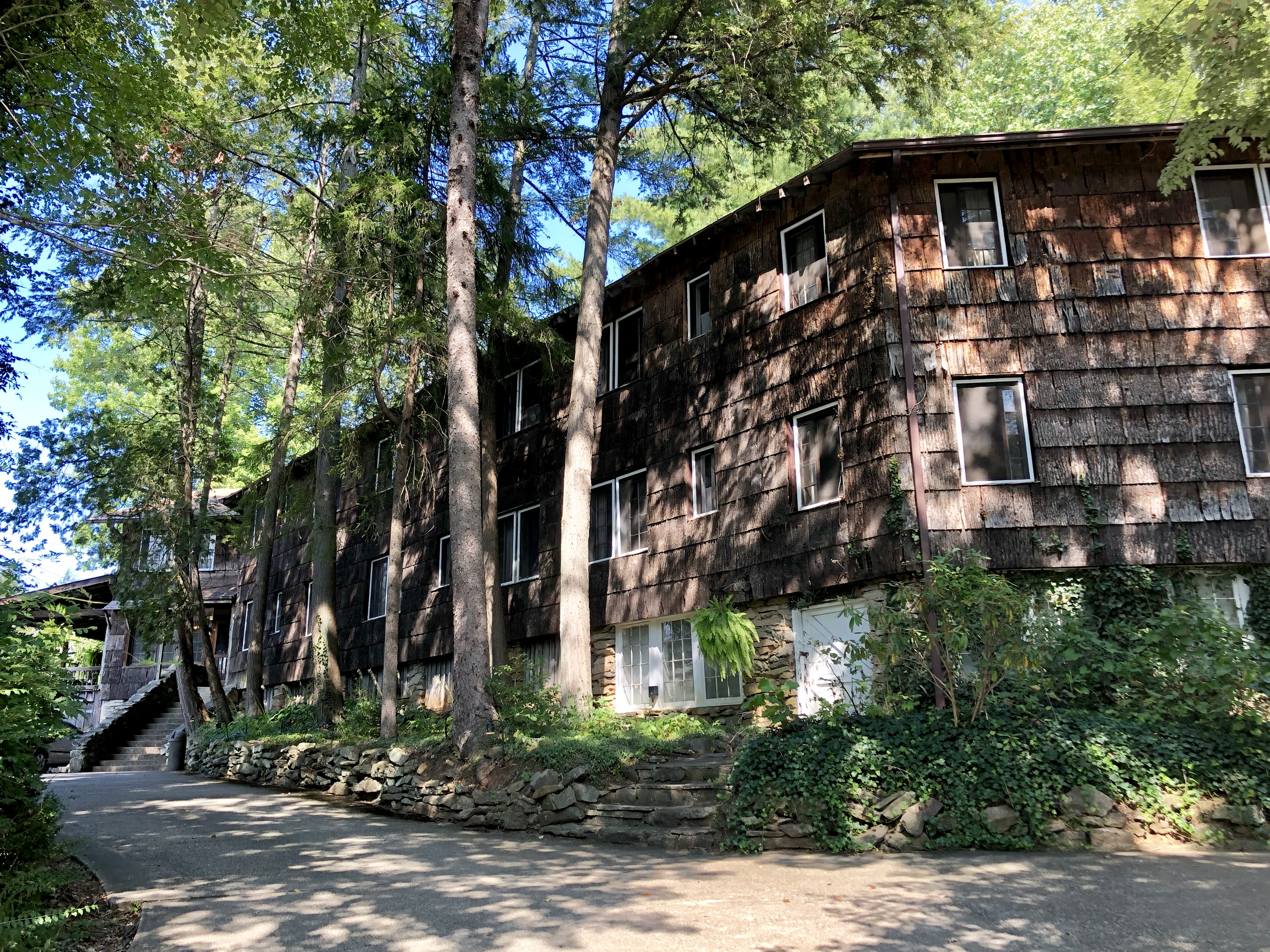
- The Fryemont Inn

- Location within North Carolina Location within the United States
- Location: Fryemont Rd. Bryson City, North Carolina
- Coordinates: 35°25′29″N 83°26′5″W
- Area: 3.4 acres (1.4 ha)
- Built: 1895
- Architectural style: Rustic
- NRHP reference No.: 83001919
- Added to NRHP: February 18, 1983

The Frye-Randolph House and Fryemont Inn are a pair of historic properties on Fryemont Road in Bryson City, North Carolina. The two buildings occupy a prominent site overlooking the Tuckasegee River and Bryson City, and are well-known local landmarks. The house is an L-shaped wood-frame structure, whose oldest portion was built c. 1895 by Amos Frye, a prominent local lawyer and landowner. The inn is a rustic mountain lodge, two stories high, part of which is clad in bark shingles. It was built by the Fryes in 1923, and is a well-preserved example of a period vacation hotel.

The properties, now under separate ownership, were listed on the National Register of Historic Places in 1983. The inn is still in operation.

== See also ==
- National Register of Historic Places listings in Swain County, North Carolina
