= Whittier, North Carolina =

- Census-designated place
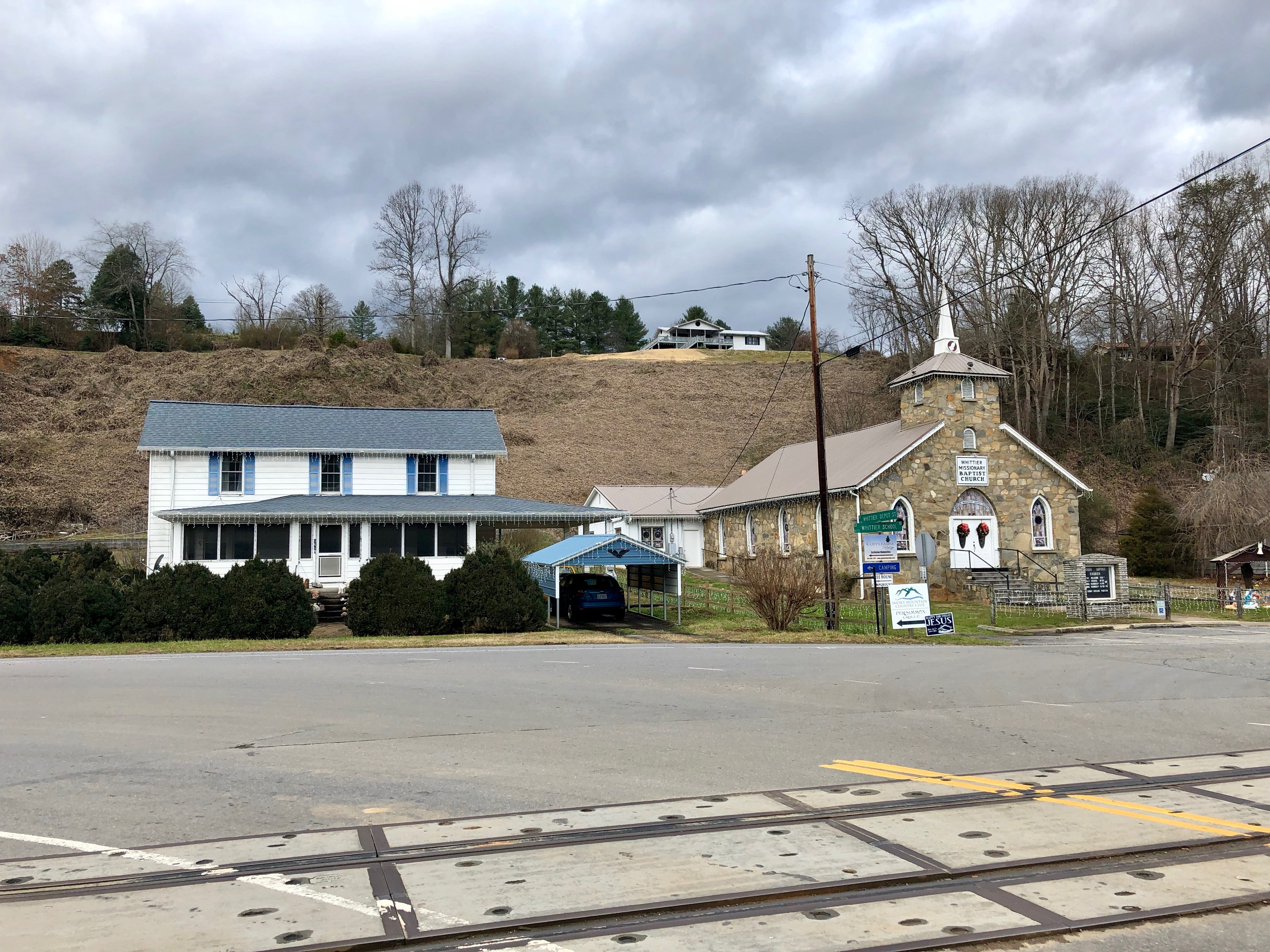

- Location within North Carolina Location within the United States
- Coordinates: 35°26′02″N 83°21′23″W
- Country: United States
- State: North Carolina
- County: Jackson and Swain
- Named for: Dr. Clarke Whittier

Area
  - Total: 0.19 sq mi (0.48 km^{2})
  - Land: 0.18 sq mi (0.47 km^{2})
  - Water: 0 sq mi (0.00 km^{2})
- Elevation: 1,926 ft (587 m)

Population (2020)
  - Total: 25
  - Density: 137/sq mi (52.8/km^{2})
- Time zone: UTC-5 (Eastern (EST))
  - Summer (DST): UTC-4 (EDT)
- ZIP codes: 28789
- Area code: 828
- FIPS code: 37-73780
- GNIS feature ID: 2805285

Whittier is an unincorporated community and census-designated place (CDP) in Jackson and Swain counties in the western part of the U.S. state of North Carolina. It was first listed as a CDP in the 2020 census with a population of 25.

Whittier is located on the Tuckasegee River, between Bryson City downstream to the west, and Dillsboro upstream to the southeast. The town of Whittier has its own Post Office, located at 22 Main Street.

== History ==
Founded in 1881 by Dr. Clarke Whittier when he purchased 60,000 acres (24,000 ha) of land in the area, it was incorporated as a town from 1887 to 1933. The town declined following the collapse of the lumber industry during the Great Depression.

== Smoky Mountain Country Club ==
Locally owned and operated golf and country club in the valley of Whittier. The 6150 yard par 71 course has stunning views of the Great Smoky Mountains, featuring one of the states largest elevation drop shot.

== Sequoyah National Golf Club ==
Owned by Eastern Band of Cherokee Indians, this 6,600 yards par 72 championship course has views of the Great Smoky Mountains. It was renovated in 2009 by Robert Trent Jones Jr, of the Robert Trent Jones II firm together with pro golfer Notah Begay III.

== Demographics ==
Historical population
Census	Pop.	Note	%±
2020	25		—
U.S. Decennial Census; 2020

Whittier first appeared as a census designated place in the 2020 U.S. census.

=== Racial and ethnic composition ===
Whittier CDP, North Carolina – Racial and ethnic composition Note: the US Census treats Hispanic/Latino as an ethnic category. This table excludes Latinos from the racial categories and assigns them to a separate category. Hispanics/Latinos may be of any race.
Race / Ethnicity (NH = Non-Hispanic)	Pop 2020	2020
White alone (NH)	21	84.00%
Black or African American alone (NH)	0	0.00%
Native American or Alaska Native alone (NH)	0	0.00%
Asian alone (NH)	0	0.00%
Native Hawaiian or Pacific Islander alone (NH)	0	0.00%
Other race alone (NH)	0	0.00%
Mixed race or Multiracial (NH)	1	4.00%
Hispanic or Latino (any race)	3	12.00%
Total	25	100.00%

== Notable People ==
- Jackson Cornblum – Influencer
- Raine Bradley – Architect
