= Great Smoky Mountains Railroad =

Tourist railroad in North Carolina, U.S.

Coordinates: 35.4294°N 83.4485°W

Overview
- Headquarters: Bryson City, North Carolina
- Reporting mark: GSMR
- Locale: Western North Carolina
- Dates of operation: 1988–present
- Predecessor: Southern Railway

Technical
- Track gauge: 4 ft 8 1/2 in (1,435 mm) standard gauge
- Length: 53 miles (85 kilometers)

Other
- Website: www.gsmr.com

The Great Smoky Mountains Railroad (reporting mark GSMR) is a heritage and freight railroad based in Bryson City, North Carolina, United States. Originally formed in 1988, it has been owned and operated by American Heritage Railways since late 1999. The GSMR operates excursion trains on the former Southern Railway (SOU) Murphy Branch between Dillsboro and Nantahala, North Carolina. The GSMR is one of the most popular tourist railroads in the United States, carrying 200,000 passengers each year.

== Background ==
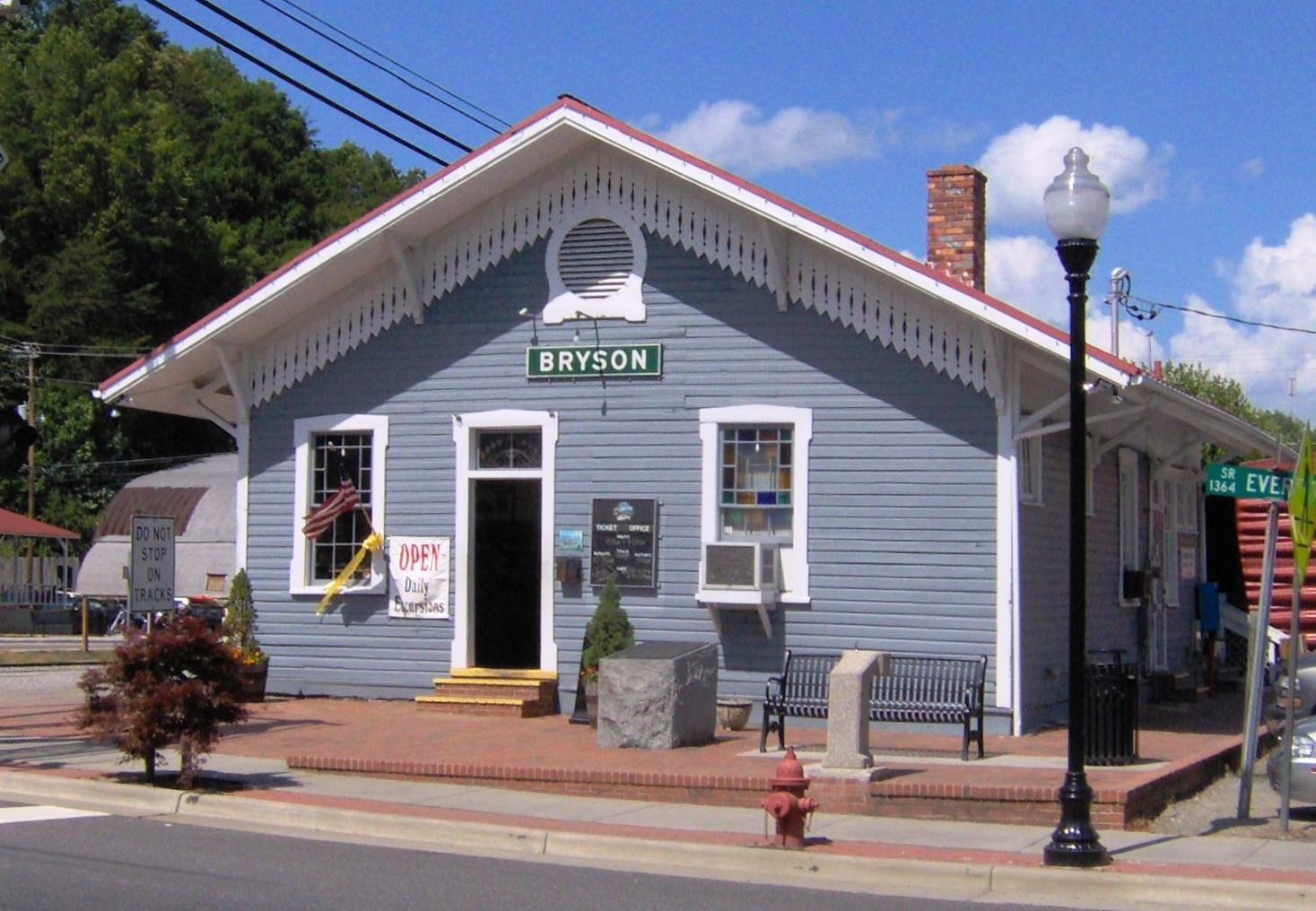
GSMR's Bryson City Depot in 2008

The Great Smoky Mountains Railway (GSMR) owns 53 miles (85 kilometers) of the Murphy Branch, a former branch line of the Southern Railway (SOU) between Dillsboro and Nantahala, North Carolina. It began operations in 1988, through a lease agreement between the NCDOT and Malcom and Joan MacNeill. With help of a team of investors, the MacNeils secured the lease only 48 hours before the Norfolk Southern would be dispatching work trains to the Murphy Branch to begin dismantling the track. The full tourist route originally operated farther west to Andrews and Murphy, North Carolina. Service between Andrews and Murphy ended in 1995. Regular service between Nantahala and Andrews ended by 2001. The railroad's owners said they ended the route due to economic reasons.

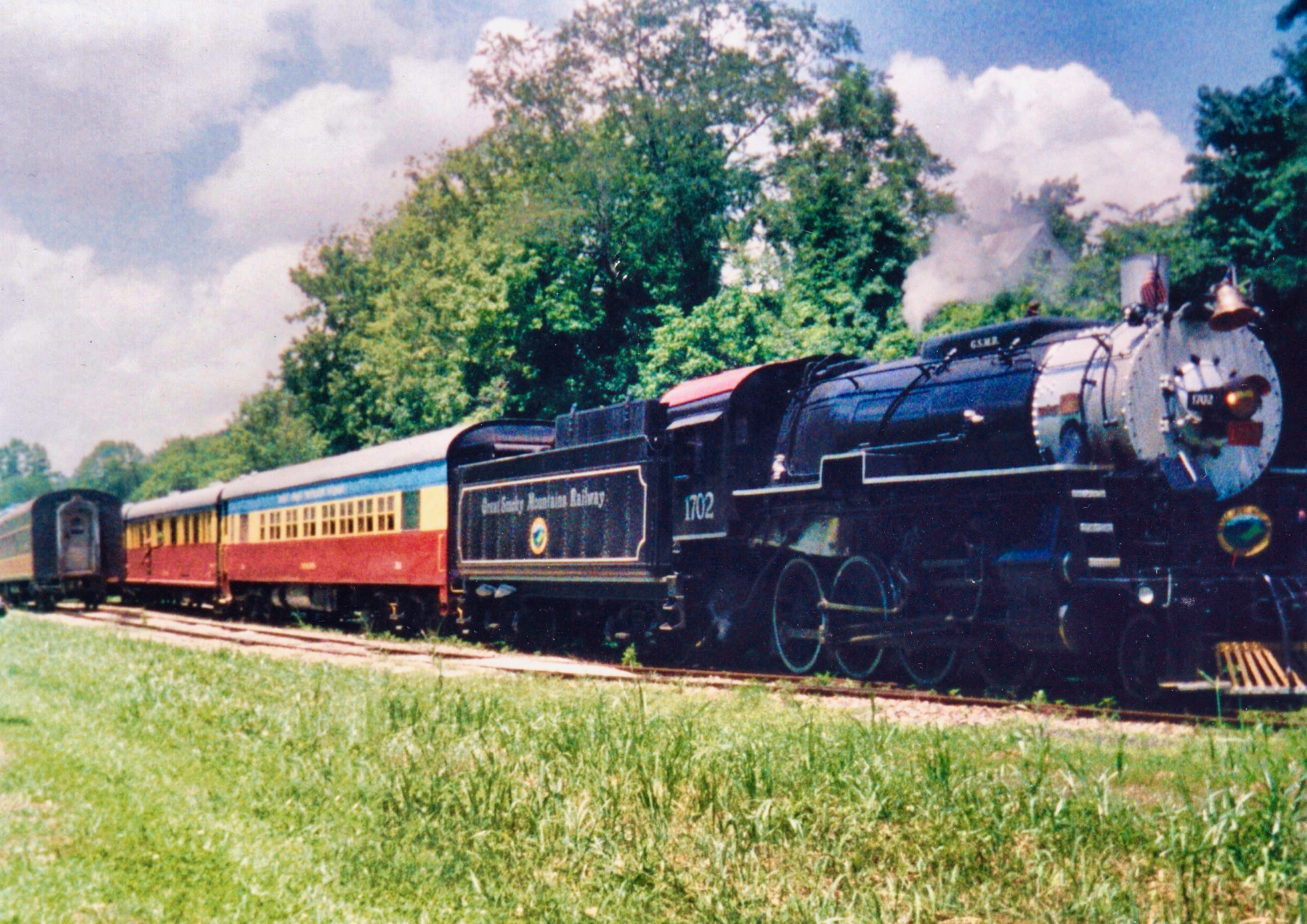
GSMR's bright "circus train" livery, seen behind steam locomotive No. 1702

In late 1999, the MacNeills sold the GSMR property to the American Heritage Railways, the owners of the Durango and Silverton Narrow Gauge Railroad (D&SNG) in Colorado. Additionally, the bright and colorful blue, yellow and red "circus train" livery was dropped in favor of the new Tuscan red and gold stripe livery. On March 9, 2000, the Great Smoky Mountain Railway was renamed to the Great Smoky Mountains Railroad.

Tourist trains of the GSMR route use a route passing through "fertile valleys, a tunnel and across river gorges" in the Great Smoky Mountains of Western North Carolina. Tourist excursions use the line between Dillsboro and Bryson City (16 miles or 26 km in length) and the line between Bryson City and Nantahala (22 miles or 35 km in length). The GSMR eventually would become one of the most popular tourist railroads in the United States with about 200,000 passengers each year. The railroad also has transported freight via an interchange with the Blue Ridge Southern Railroad in Sylva near Jackson Paper Manufacturing.

In 2004, GSMR debuted its "Polar Express" train ride, based on the newly released movie and licensed through Warner Brothers. This ride has been an annual major economy boost for the railroad and the town of Bryson City. In 2019, GSMR broke all attendance records, with more than 91,000 people riding the Polar Express excursion alone.

In 2007, due an unresolved dispute with the Dillsboro Town Council, the GSMR decided to relocate its headquarters from Dillsboro to Bryson City and close the Dillsboro depot. However, the Tuckasegee River excursions between Dillsboro and Bryson City continued, with the trips originating in Bryson City and laying over in Dillsboro.

In March 2020, the COVID-19 pandemic outbreak caused the GSMR to suspend operations. However, they resumed on June 4, 2020, with provisions for public health such as social distancing.

== Equipment ==
=== Locomotives ===
GSMR had a current operational diesel locomotive roster of seven 4-axle (B-B) units, as any 6-axle (C-C) unit would be too big for the tunnels, and too long for some the line's tight or sharp curves. All of the current units were built by The Electro-Motive Division of General Motors (EMD). GSMR has two GP9s, Nos. 1751 and 1755, a GP30 No. 2467, two GP38-2s Nos. 2668 and 2335, an F9A No. 4210.

GSMR owns one operational steam locomotive; S160 2-8-0 "Consolidation" type No. 1702, which was built by Baldwin Locomotive Works in September 1942 for the U.S. Army during World War II. In 1991, it was purchased by the GSMR, and it operated until 2004, when it was taken out of service, due to firebox issues. In 2012, the GSMR made an agreement with Swain County of North Carolina donating $700,000 to construct a new steam locomotive workshop for the restoration of No. 1702 and installing a new turntable in Bryson City for the locomotive to be turned around. Afterwards, the restoration work of No. 1702 began in mid 2014 and completed in late July 2016 with the locomotive reentering excursion service.

GSMR also owns another 2-8-0 built by Baldwin, Southern Railway Ks-1 No. 722, which worked on the former Murphy Branch from 1904 to 1952 and later operated from 1970 to 1980 in the Southern Railway's steam excursion program. The GSMR purchased it in late 2000 and planned to restore it to operating condition by 2027. The locomotive will be converted to burn oil like No. 1702.

During 2010, GSMR purchased a third steam locomotive, a former Swedish State Railways 4-6-0 No. 1149, from the defunct Belfast and Moosehead Lake Railroad. This locomotive was originally slated to be moved to the GSMR in spring 2011. However, the engine remained on the B&ML for two more years. Ultimately, the railroad deemed the locomotive's planned move too costly and instead sold it to the Discovery Park of America in Union City, Tennessee. In 1990, the GSMR considered importing a newly-built China Railways SY steam locomotive for use in their operations, but for unknown reasons, they never placed an order.

In 2020, GSMR retired GP9 No. 777, and GP7 No. 711 was retired in early 2022. The two units were purchased by YouTuber Jimmy Donaldson, better known as MrBeast, who used No. 777 and No. 711 for stunts in videos. The videos were uploaded to YouTube in 2022; No. 777 was scrapped soon after the video it was featured in, and No. 711 was left abandoned in a field in Whittier, North Carolina.

==== Current locomotive roster ====
Locomotive details
Number	Image	Type	Wheel arrangement	Classification	Builder	Built	Serial number	Former owner	Status
722		Steam	2-8-0	Ks-1	Baldwin Locomotive Works	1904	24729	Southern Railway, East Tennessee Western North Carolina, Wilmington and Western (leased), Tennessee Valley Railroad Museum.	Under Restoration, estimated to completed in 2026 or 2027.
1702		Steam	2-8-0	S160	Baldwin Locomotive Works	1942	64641	U.S. Army, Warren & Saline River Railroad, Reader Railroad, Fremont and Elkhorn Valley Railroad	Operational
1751		Diesel	(B-B)	GP9	Electro-Motive Diesel (EMD)	1955	19968	Southern Pacific, Arizona Eastern Railway, San Joaquin Valley Railroad	Operational
1755		Diesel	(B-B)	GP9	Electro-Motive Diesel (EMD)	1956	21359	Southern Pacific, Arizona Eastern Railway, San Joaquin Valley Railroad	Operational.
2335		Diesel	(B-B)	GP38-2	Electro-Motive Diesel (EMD)	1972	7342	St. Louis-San Francisco Railway, BNSF Railway	Operational
2467	–	Diesel	(B-B)	GP30-3	Electro-Motive Diesel (EMD)	1963	28092	Atchison, Topeka and Santa Fe Railway, BNSF Railway	Operational
2668		Diesel	(B-B)	GP38-3	Electro-Motive Diesel (EMD)	1971	37275	Louisville and Nashville, GATX	Operational
4210	–	Diesel	(B-B)	F9A	Electro-Motive Diesel (EMD)	1956	37275	Erie Mining Company	Operational
3199	-	Diesel	(B-B)	GP50	Electro-Motive Diesel (EMD)	1985	847057--7	Atchison, Topeka and Santa Fe Railway, BNSF Railway	Recently Purchased
1901	–	Diesel	(B-B)	U18B	General Electric (GE)	1973	38848	Seaboard Coast Line, CSX Transportation	wrecked, Static display
536	–	Diesel	(B-B)	GP30	Electro-Motive Diesel (EMD)	1962	27369	Norfolk and Western	wrecked, Static display

==== Retired locomotives ====
No. 777 was retired in early 2020 and No. 711 in early 2022.

Number	Image	Type	Wheel arrangement	Classification	Builder	Built	Retired date	Serial number	Former owner	Status
200		Diesel	(B-B)	GP9	Electro-Motive Diesel (EMD)	April 1954	1993	19201	Union Pacific	Now NKPX 200
210	-	Diesel	(B-B)	GP35	Electro-Motive Diesel (EMD)	1964	Early 2000s	28625	Norfolk and Western	Now WRIX 3511. Rebuilt with low hood sometime after 1999
223		Diesel	(B-B)	GP35	Electro-Motive Diesel (EMD)	1964	Early 2000s	29223	Norfolk and Western	Now CBR 1916 in Oregon. Rebuilt with low hood sometime after 1999
711		Diesel	(B-B)	GP7	Electro-Motive Diesel (EMD)	1954	2022	19104	Chicago and North Western, Union Pacific	Abandoned at a field in Whittier, North Carolina following staged train wreck (35°24'46"N 83°19'45"W)
777		Diesel	(B-B)	GP9	Electro-Motive Diesel (EMD)	1954	2020	19874	Chicago and North Western, Union Pacific	Destroyed in staged train wreck; subsequently scrapped
992	-	Diesel	(B-B)	CF7	Electro-Motive Diesel (EMD)	1951 (original), 1970s (rebuild)	-	-	Atchison, Topeka, & Santa Fe	Originally F7A #262L. Sold to Texas & Northern, likely scrapped in early 2000s.
993	-	Diesel	(B-B)	CF7	Electro-Motive Diesel (EMD)	1949 (original), 1970s (rebuild)	-	7760	Atchison, Topeka, & Santa Fe	Originally F7A #209L. Sold to Texas & Northern, current whereabouts unknown.
1009		Diesel	(B-B)	GP38-3	Electro Motive Diesel (EMD)	1964	Late 2022 or early 2023	29006	Pennsylvania Railroad	Sold to Johnson Railway Services in late summer 2025 and operates for the Pickens Railway

== Towns and attractions served ==
- Dillsboro
- Whittier
- Bryson City
- Fontana Lake
- The Nantahala Outdoor Center

== Smoky Mountain Trains Museum ==
The railroad owns the Smoky Mountain Trains Museum in Bryson City, North Carolina; located across Greenlee Street from the Bryson City Depot. The museum features a collection of over 7,000 Lionel model engines, cars and accessories, a large model train layout, a children's activity center, and a gift shop.

== Popular culture ==
GSMR's No. 1702 steam locomotive was featured in the 1966 film This Property Is Condemned, starring Natalie Wood, Robert Redford, and Charles Bronson.

The famous train wreck scene in the 1993 Warner Brothers blockbuster movie The Fugitive starring Harrison Ford and Tommy Lee Jones was filmed in Dillsboro along the Great Smoky Mountains Railroad.

The Great Smoky Mountains Railroad was used in the filming of 1996 Warner Brothers comedy My Fellow Americans starring Jack Lemmon and James Garner; they stumble onto a charter train full of UNC-Chapel Hill fans headed for the NCAA Final Four.

Train scenes in the 1999 DreamWorks SKG film Forces of Nature starring Ben Affleck and Sandra Bullock also were filmed on the Great Smoky Mountains Railroad.

== Incidents ==
- On August 22, 2017, No. 2467 collided into a Georgia Military College coach bus at the Nantahala Outdoor Center, injuring the bus driver and eight passengers.

== See also ==
- List of heritage railroads in the United States

== Bibliography ==
- George, Michael; Strack, Frank (2012). Passage Through Time: The Official Guidebook (3rd ed.). Great Smoky Mountains Railroad.
- Plott, Jacob; Plott, Bob (2021). Smoky Mountain Railways (1st ed.). The History Press. ISBN 978-1-4671-4459-9.
