= Swain County Schools =

School district in North Carolina, United States

Location
- Swain County, North Carolina United States

District information
- Type: Public
- Grades: PK–12
- Superintendent: Mark Sale
- Schools: 5
- Budget: $30,860,000

Students and staff
- Students: 1,910
- Teachers: 135.51
- Staff: 164.2
- Student–teacher ratio: 14.09:1

Other information
- Website: www.swain.k12.nc.us

Swain County Schools (SCS) or Swain County Public Schools is a school district headquartered in Bryson City, North Carolina.

It serves all sections of Swain County except for the portion on the Eastern Cherokee Reservation, which instead is zoned to Cherokee Central Schools. Native American students in the SCS boundary may also attend Cherokee Central schools.

As of 2023, Swain County Schools' enrollment is 1,910. The district employs 164 staff and 135 teachers. It has a student-to-teacher ratio of 14.09:1. The district's budget is $30.86 million, or $15,983 per student. As of 2024, Swain County pays the lowest annual amount per student ($419) of any county in North Carolina. This is because the school system also receives funding from the Cherokee tribe.

== History ==
In 2004 Lynne Billings of the Asheville Citizen-Times wrote that the school system was well-regarded in the community.

== Schools ==
- Swain County High School
- Swain County Middle School
- Swain East Elementary School
- Swain West Elementary School
- Bright Adventures Pre-Kindergarten
  - As of 2021 it was located in mobile homes that were constructed circa 2001 The district could only enroll about 65-70% of the 4-year olds in the district's service area, and it would need four more classrooms to have all district students served. The district hoped to expand its pre-kindergarten program.
