= GSMR =

GSMR may refer to:

- Great Smoky Mountains Railroad reporting mark
- GSM-R, railway communication system
