= WTIJ-LP =

- Bryson City, North Carolina; United States
- Broadcast area: Metro Bryson City
- Frequency: 100.7 MHz

Programming
- Format: Religious; Southern Gospel
- Affiliations: SRN News

Ownership
- Owner: Grace Christian Academy

History
- First air date: November 27, 2015
- Call sign meaning: We Trust In Jesus

Technical information
- Licensing authority: FCC
- Facility ID: 197575
- Class: L1
- ERP: 100 watts
- HAAT: −200 meters (−660 ft)
- Transmitter coordinates: 35°25′12.0″N 83°26′49.0″W

Links
- Public license information: LMS
- Website: WTIJ-LP Online

WTIJ-LP is a Religious and Southern Gospel formatted broadcast radio station licensed to and serving Bryson City, North Carolina. WTIJ-LP is owned and operated by Grace Christian Academy.

== History ==
WTIJ-LP, Swain County's first FM station, launched at 5:00 pm on November 27, 2015. The station's studios are located at Grace Christian Academy in Bryson City.

== Silence and return ==
On February 28, 2016, three months and a day after its launch, WTIJ-LP signed off and went silent. According to a letter written by former station manager Robert Lowe, to the Federal Communications Commission (FCC), the Grace Christian Academy had "chosen to discontinue the service". Mr. Lowe's position at the station had been "terminated". At the time the letter was written, there was "no anticipated date to recommence broadcast operations".

On August 8, 2016, WTIJ-LP returned to the air with a Religious and Southern Gospel format. Local programming previously heard on the station before going silent is no longer broadcast.

== Programming ==
Prior to February 28, 2016, WTIJ-LP carried a Christian-based Full Service format, featuring Positive Country and Southern Gospel music. Local news, weather and agricultural reports were also broadcast. Live broadcasts of local high school sports, as well as community events, were also heard. WTIJ-LP had future plans to partner with other local organizations.

After August 8, 2016, the station broadcasts nationally syndicated Religious programs and Southern Gospel music, with no locally produced programming. SRN News continues to be heard at the top of each hour.
