= Swain County Courthouse =

- U.S. National Register of Historic Places
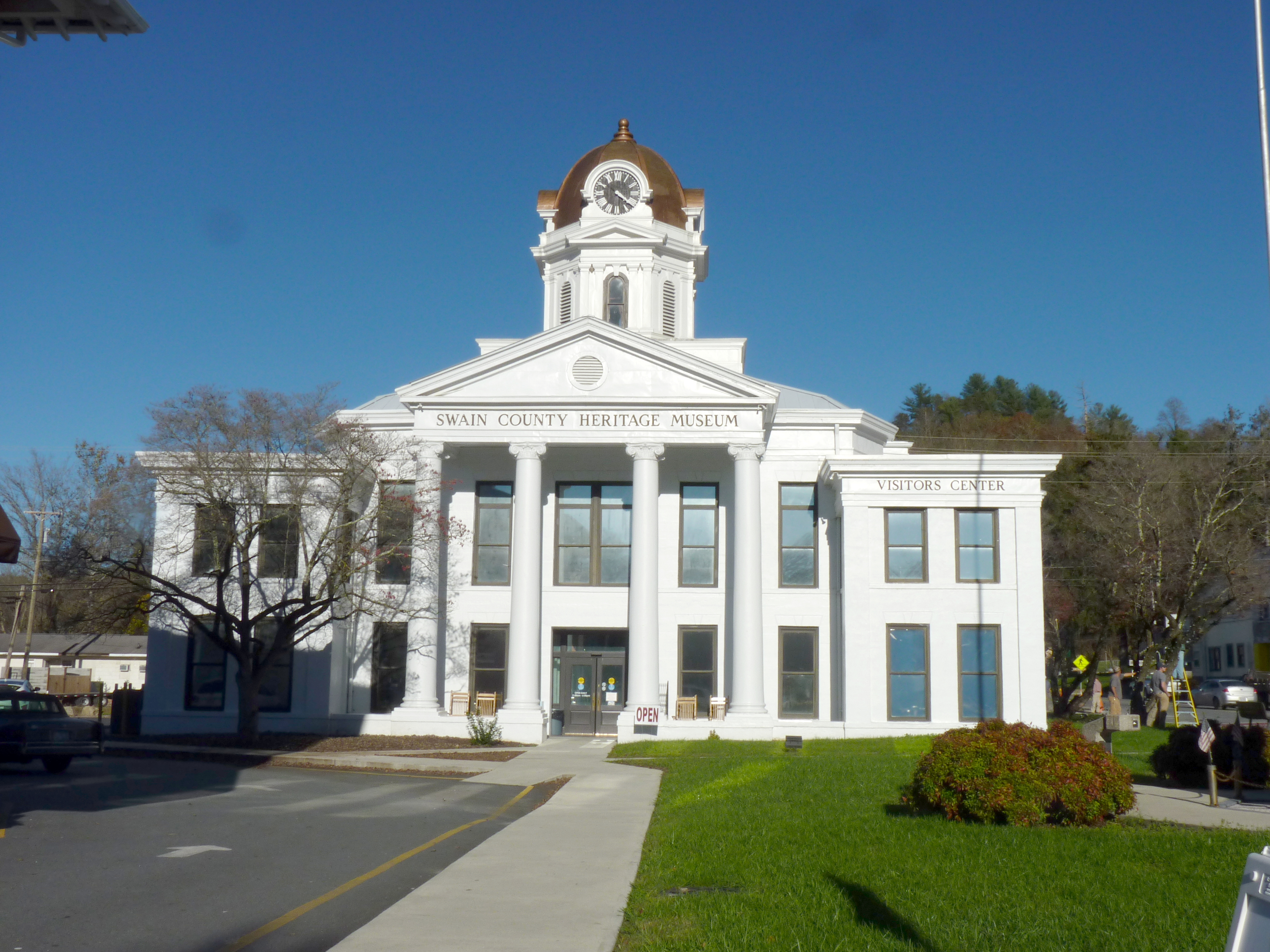

- Location within North Carolina Location within the United States
- Location: Main and Fry Sts., Bryson City, North Carolina
- Coordinates: 35°25′40″N 83°26′44″W
- Area: less than one acre
- Built: 1908
- Built by: Fall City Construction Co.
- Architect: Milburn, Frank P., & Smith, R.S.
- Architectural style: Classical Revival
- MPS: North Carolina County Courthouses TR
- NRHP reference No.: 79001752
- Added to NRHP: May 10, 1979

The Swain County Courthouse is a historic courthouse located at Main and Fry Streets in Bryson City, the county seat of Swain County, North Carolina. The two-story Classical Revival structure was designed by Frank Pierce Milburn and R. S. Smith, and built in 1908. It has a central core block, which is fronted by a Classical tetrastyle portico with Ionic columns and has a hip roof. This block is flanked by symmetrical wings, except for the southern facade, where a secondary entrance is flanked by Ionic pilasters. It is the county's third courthouse; the first was a log structure built in 1872, and the second was built in 1880 after the first burned down.

The courthouse was listed on the National Register of Historic Places in 1979. The building is now used as the Swain County Heritage Museum.

== See also ==
- National Register of Historic Places listings in Swain County, North Carolina
