= Ellen Black Winston =

American sociologist and social worker

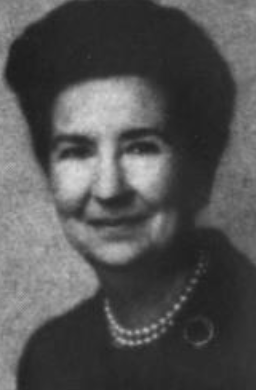
- Ellen Black Winston, from a 1967 publication of the US Department of State
- Born: August 15, 1903; Bryson City, North Carolina, U.S.
- Died: June 19, 1984 (aged 80)
- Education: Converse College; University of Chicago
- Occupations: United States Commissioner of Welfare; Administrator and teacher, Raleigh High School

Ellen Black Winston (August 15, 1903 – June 19, 1984) was a social worker who worked to develop systems to support those who were underprivileged in North Carolina. She became the North Carolina Commissioner of Public Welfare and the first United States Commissioner of Welfare.

== Early life and education ==
Ellen Black Winston was born in Bryson City, North Carolina, the daughter of Stanley Warren Black and Marianna Fischer Black. She was one of five children; however, the first child was stillborn. Winston graduated from Converse College in Spartanburg, South Carolina in 1924, and she received her M.A. and Ph.D. degrees in sociology from the University of Chicago in 1928 and 1930 respectively. She also earned five honorary doctoral degrees, some from the University of North Carolina and Duke University.

== Career ==
Winston had many occupations throughout her career. After receiving her master's and doctoral degrees in sociology, Winston became a teacher of social science, the dean of girls, and the director of guidance in high schools in the Raleigh area from 1928 to 1934. Winston then moved on to become the director editor of technical publications on public relief in the Division of Research of the Works Progress Administration in Washington D.C. from 1934 to 1939. Afterwards, Winston became the chairman of the Department of Sociology and Economics at Meredith College, the North Carolina Commissioner of Public Welfare, and was eventually appointed, by President John F. Kennedy, as the United States Commissioner of Welfare in 1963. This position was held for a four-year term until she stepped down in 1967 in order to work on social welfare policy issues that she believed needed to be changed. Prior to her death, after retiring from social service work, Winston received one of the five Distinguished Women of North Carolina Awards.

== Personal life ==
Winston married Dr. Sanford R. Winston, who was the chairman of the Department of Sociology and Anthropology at North Carolina State University for around thirty years, in 1928. They did not have any children. Winston also the author of several articles, mostly related to public welfare and other social services. After Winston's death in 1984, her memorial services were held at Meredith College.
