= Swain County High School =

American public school in North Carolina

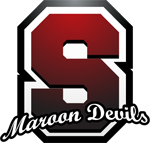

Location
- 1415 Fontana Road; Bryson City, North Carolina 28713; United States; 35°26′51″N 83°27′24″W

Information
- School type: Public
- Motto: "Our best and then some"
- Established: 1950 (76 years ago)
- School district: Swain County Public Schools
- CEEB code: 340460
- Principal: Tyler Shuler
- Teaching staff: 27.72 (FTE)
- Enrollment: 536 (2024–2025)
- Student to teacher ratio: 19.34
- Campus type: Rural
- Colors: Maroon and white
- Athletics conference: Smoky Mountain Conference
- Mascot: Maroon Devils
- Website: high.swain.k12.nc.us

Swain County High School is a public high school located in Bryson City, North Carolina. Swain County High School is a part of the Swain County School System. It is the only 9–12 high school in the county.

It serves all areas of the county except for portions in the Eastern Cherokee Reservation, which are served by Cherokee Central Schools.

== History ==
Swain County High School is a result of consolidations in the 1950s and a 1970s building program. It was originally four high schools: Bryson City (1924), Whittier (1936), Alarka (1938), and Almond (1925), but in 1950 additions were made to Bryson City High School and officials named it Swain County High School. The high school remained at this campus on School House Hill in Bryson City until 1977, when a two-story, tan brick high school and gymnasium were finished northwest of Bryson City on Fontana Road. The old high school then became Bryson City Elementary School until restructuring of the school system in 1991. At the time of restructuring, there were four kindergarten through 8th grade elementary schools in Swain County, at Whittier, Bryson City, Alarka, and Almond. In 1991, Swain East Elementary and Swain West Elementary opened to students, replacing the older community-based schools. The middle school was located in the former Almond Elementary School building until 1994, when the newly rebuilt, renovated, and expanded Bryson City campus opened its doors as Swain County Middle School. In 1997, 6th grade was added to the middle school, along with an expansion to the facilities. In 2000, a new auditorium and several new classrooms were added to Swain County High School. This annex now houses the Swain County Center for the Arts. In 2011, eight new classrooms were added to Swain West Elementary, and officials drew plans for a new high school. These plans called for moving the middle school, and restructuring the Elementary School districts. However, due to budget constraints, the county ultimately funded a massive refurbishments and addition to the current high school.

=== Football ===
Swain County High School has eight North Carolina state football championships with the most recent coming in 2011. Swain County High School also has one undefeated season, one regional championship and two league championships. The culture around Swain is filled with a football rich atmosphere.

=== Future plans ===
Presently, the school is developing a plan to build a new School somewhere nearby on land that the school board already owns; the present building would then become a new Middle School and the current Middle School would become an Elementary School, alleviating overcrowding of Swain East and Swain West Elementary Schools.

== Accreditation ==
The school is accredited by the Southern Association of Colleges and Schools and by the North Carolina Department of Public Instruction.

== Notable alumni ==
- Heath Shuler, former NFL quarterback and U.S. representative for North Carolina's 11th congressional district
