= Swain County, North Carolina =

County in North Carolina, United States

- County
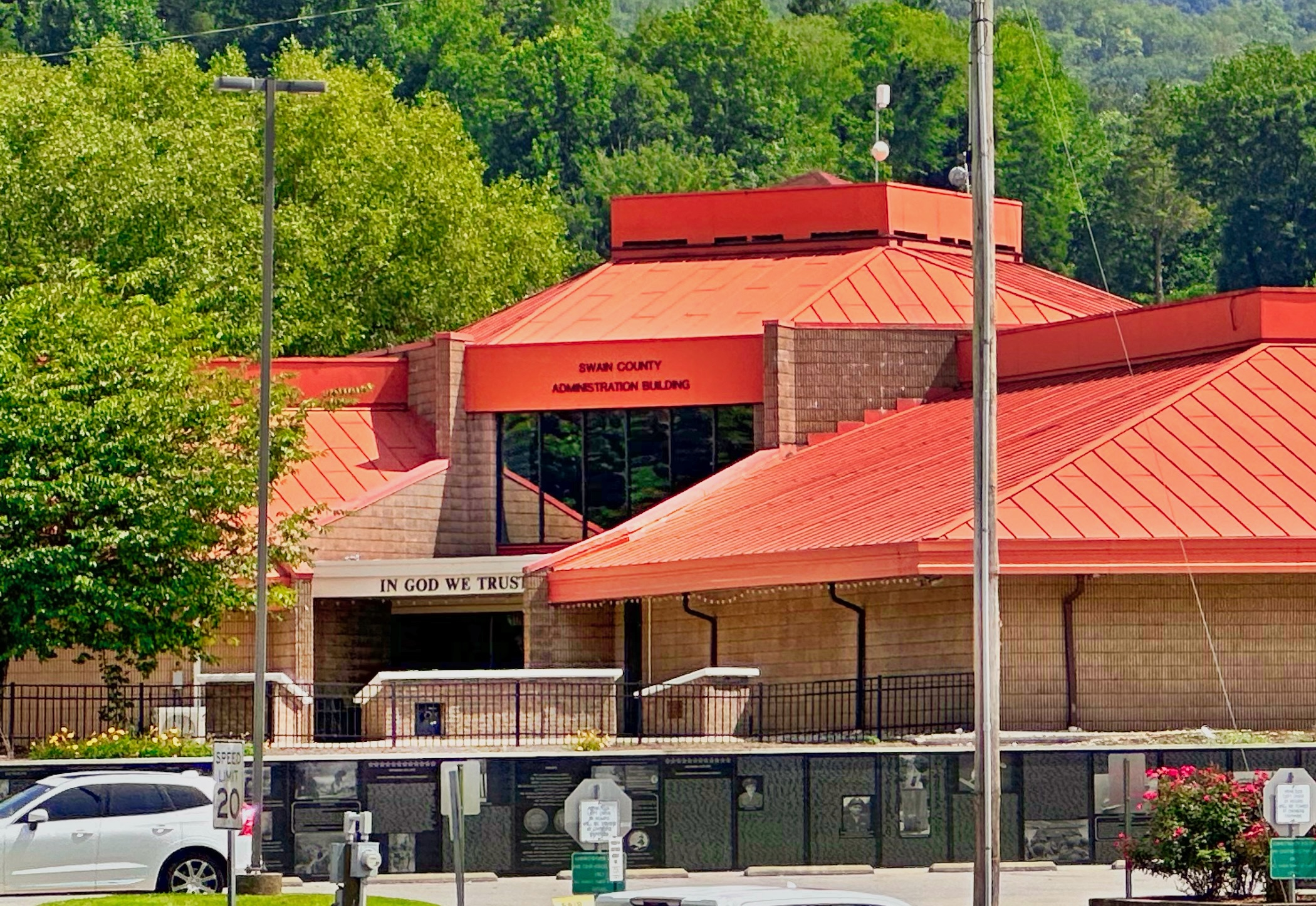
- Swain County Courthouse

- Seal
- Motto(s): "A natural gem set in the Great Smoky Mountains." "Live here. Play here. Thrive here."
- Location within the U.S. state of North Carolina
- Coordinates: 35.57°N 83.47°W
- Country: United States
- State: North Carolina
- Founded: 1871
- Named for: David L. Swain
- Seat: Bryson City
- Largest community: Cherokee

Area
  - Total: 540.25 sq mi (1,399.2 km^{2})
  - Land: 527.73 sq mi (1,366.8 km^{2})
  - Water: 12.52 sq mi (32.4 km^{2}) 2.32%

Population (2020)
  - Total: 14,117
  - Estimate (2025): 14,024 ▼
  - Density: 26.75/sq mi (10.33/km^{2})
- Time zone: UTC−5 (Eastern)
  - Summer (DST): UTC−4 (EDT)
- Congressional district: 11th
- Website: www.swaincountync.gov

Swain County is a county located on the far western border of the U.S. state of North Carolina. As of the 2020 census, the population was 14,117. Its county seat is Bryson City.

Four rivers flow through the mountainous terrain of Swain County: the Nantahala River, Oconaluftee River, Tuckaseegee River, and the Little Tennessee River. Their valleys have been occupied for thousands of years by various societies of Indigenous peoples, including the South Appalachian Mississippian culture era, and the Cherokee people. Native Americans, mostly members of the federally recognized Eastern Band of Cherokee Indians, comprise 29% of the population in Swain County.

== History ==
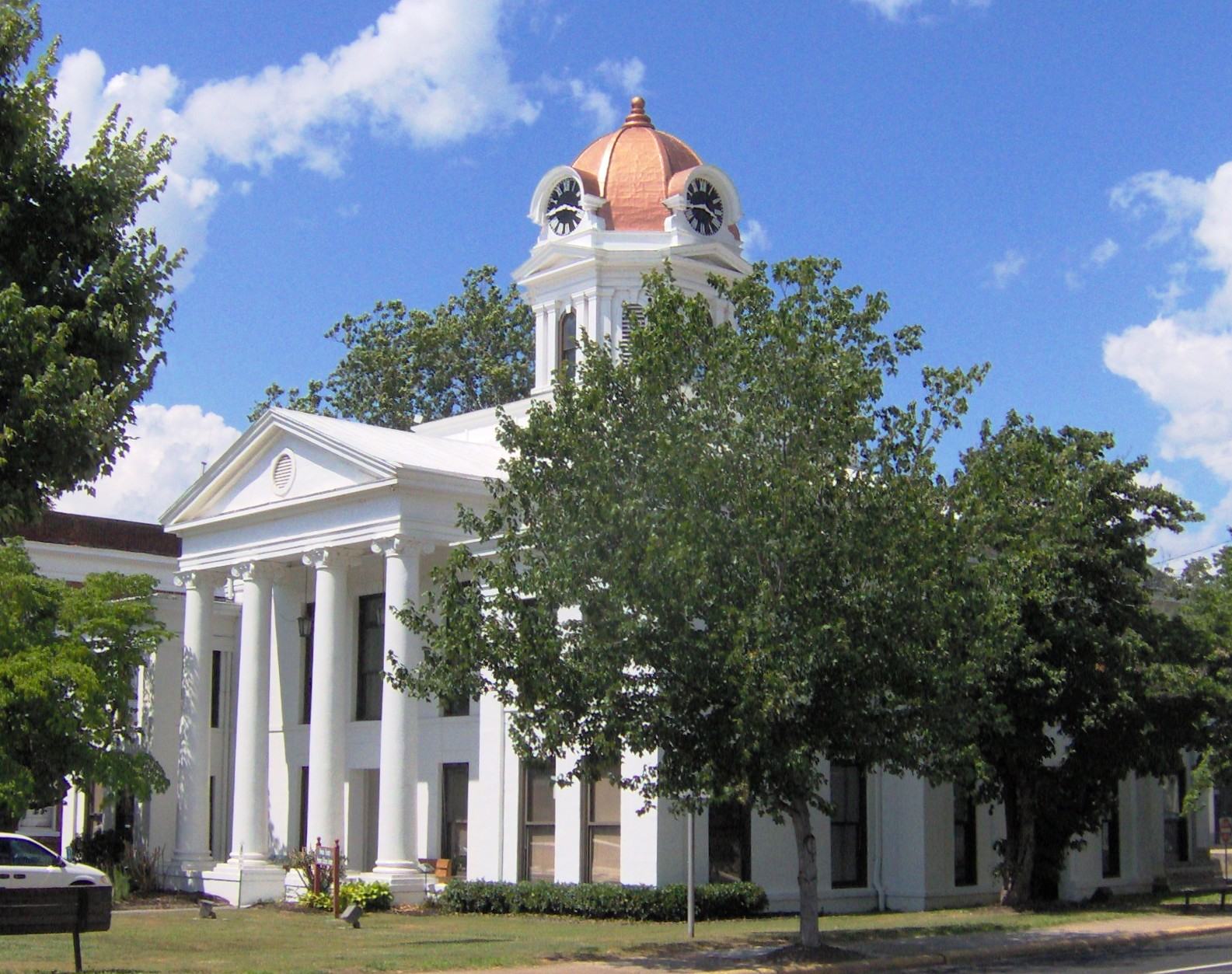
Former Swain County Courthouse in Bryson City

This area was occupied for thousands of years by cultures of indigenous peoples, who successively settled in the valleys of the three rivers and their tributaries. During the Woodland and South Appalachian Mississippian culture period, the latter beginning about 1000 CE, the peoples built earthwork platform mounds as their central public architecture. The more influential villages were each organized around a single mound with smaller villages nearby. The earliest European explorers, including two Spanish expeditions of the mid-to-late 16th century, are believed to have encountered Mississippian chiefdoms in some parts of the interior of the Southeast.

The historic Cherokee people emerged as a culture, and they became the primary occupants of a large homeland taking in what is now known as western Virginia, western North and South Carolina, southeastern Tennessee, northeast Georgia and northern Alabama. Numerous Cherokee towns were located along the Tuckaseegee River in this area, including Kituwa above the confluence with the Little Tennessee River. It is considered the Cherokee 'mother town'. The Eastern Band of Cherokee Indians (EBCI) acquired the Kituwa mound and former town site in 1996, and preserve it as sacred ground.

After the American Revolutionary War, more European Americans moved into this territory, seeking new lands west of the Appalachian Mountains. They came into increasing conflict with the Cherokee and other tribes whose territory they encroached on. Under President Andrew Jackson, Congress passed the Indian Removal Act of 1830, to force the Five Civilized Tribes out of the Southeast. He used federal army forces to round up and accompany most of the Cherokee to Indian Territory west of the Mississippi River (the area was later admitted in 1907 as the state of Oklahoma).

Population growth was slow in the more isolated Swain County. It was not organized by European Americans until 1871 during the Reconstruction era, when it was formed from parts of Jackson and Macon counties. It was named for David L. Swain, governor of North Carolina from 1832 to 1835 during the time of Indian Removal, and president of the University of North Carolina from 1835 to 1868.

Present-day Bryson City, designated as the county seat, developed on both sides of the Tuckaseegee River, which passes and completely surrounds the Bryson City Island Park. After that, it enters Fontana Lake and flows into the Little Tennessee River.

In 1868 the federal government recognized the Eastern Band of Cherokee Indians, made up of people who had stayed at the time of removal and their descendants. In the 1870s, they purchased within what is now Swain County the land area that became known the "Qualla Boundary" land trust. They are the only federally recognized tribe in North Carolina.

== Geography ==
Interactive map of Swain County

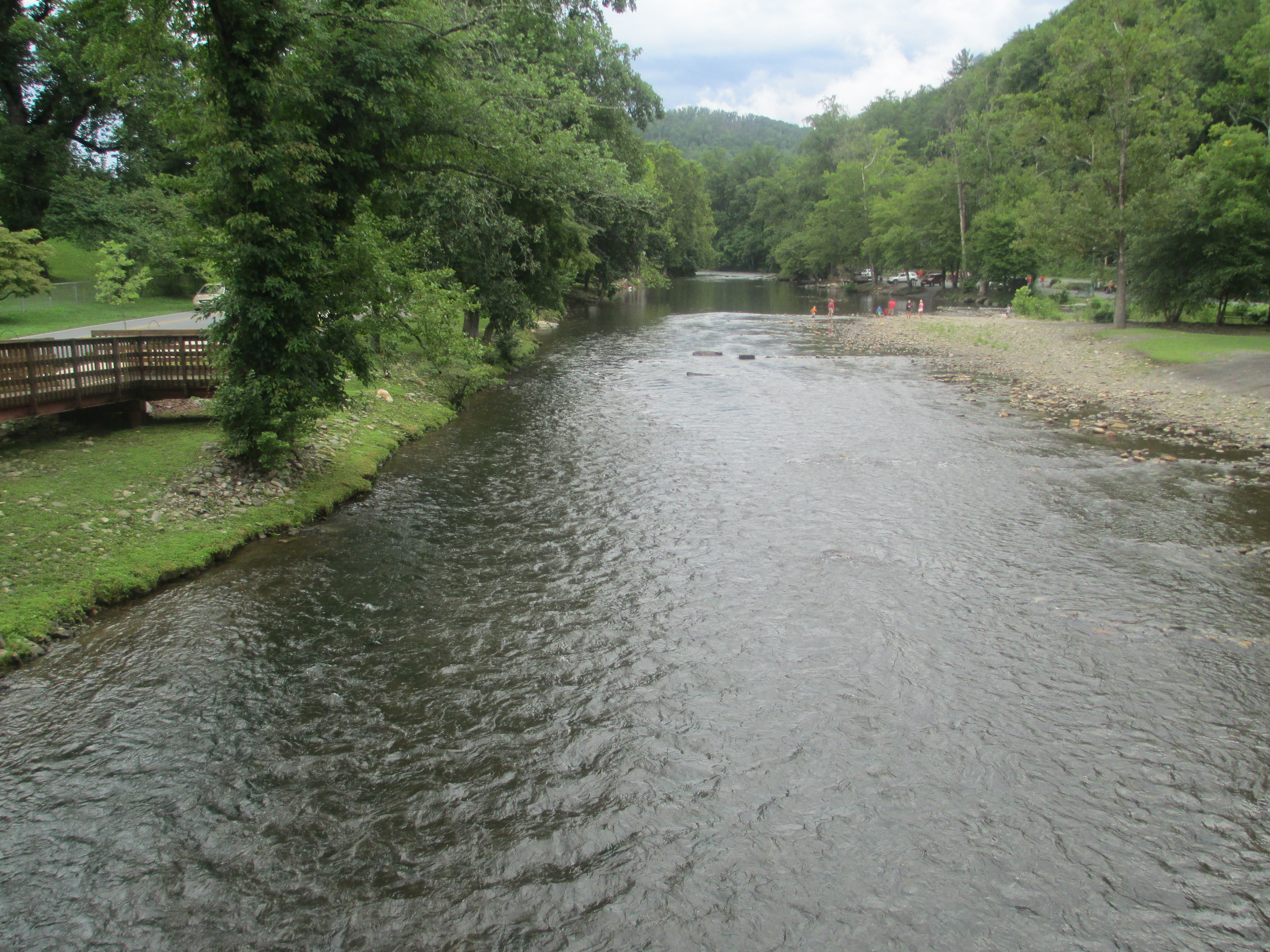
Oconaluftee River in Cherokee

According to the U.S. Census Bureau, Swain county has a total area of 540.25 square miles (1,399.2 km^{2}), of which 527.73 square miles (1,366.8 km^{2}) is land and 12.52 square miles (32.4 km^{2}) (2.32%) is water.

The county is located in far Western North Carolina in the Great Smoky Mountains. It holds more of the Great Smoky Mountains National Park than any other county in North Carolina or Tennessee. The highest point in the county is Kuwohi (formerly Clingmans Dome), elevation 6,643 feet (2,025 m), which is the third-highest peak in North Carolina and is located on the NC/TN border. A walkable observation tower is located on its summit. The highest mountain in North Carolina and in the United States east of the Mississippi River is Mount Mitchell, 6,684 feet (2,037 m), located northeast of Asheville, North Carolina, in Yancey County.

Three rivers ultimately feed the Little Tennessee River, which flows through the mountains into Tennessee. The Nantahala River is one of the most popular whitewater rafting rivers in the nation. It is a tributary of the Little Tennessee River.

As of 2024, Swain County has 3,930 acres of agricultural land – the fourth-lowest amount in the state.

=== Cherokee reserve ===
The Oconaluftee River flows through Swain County and the town of Cherokee, where the federally recognized Eastern Band of Cherokee Indians is based. Their Qualla Boundary occupies territory in both Swain and Jackson counties. The Oconaluftee is a tributary of the Tuckaseegee River. Ancient Cherokee towns were located along both of these rivers. The Tuckaseegee flows into the Little Tennessee River before it leaves North Carolina. It also had important Cherokee towns, each developed around an earthwork mound. The Cherokee built their communal townhouse on top of these mounds.

=== National protected areas ===
- Blue Ridge Parkway (part)
- Great Smoky Mountains National Park (part)
- Nantahala National Forest (part)

=== State and local protected areas/sites ===
- Nantahala National Forest Game Land (part)
- Needmore Game Land (part)
- Shuckstack Fire Tower
- William H. Silver Game Land (part)

=== Major water bodies ===
- Brush Creek
- Bunches Creek
- Cullasaja River
- Deep Creek
- Fingerlake
- Fontana Lake
- Forney Creek
- Licklog Creek
- Little Tennessee River
- Nantahala River
- Noland Creek
- Oconaluftee River
- Pigeon Creek
- Tuckasegee River
- Wesser Creek

=== Adjacent counties ===
- Sevier County, Tennessee – north
- Haywood County – east
- Jackson County – southeast
- Macon County – south
- Graham County – southwest
- Blount County, Tennessee – northwest

=== Major highways ===
- US 19
- US 19 Conn.
- US 19 Truck
- US 74
- US 129
- US 441
- US 441 Bus.
- NC 28
- Blue Ridge Parkway

=== Major infrastructure ===
- Bryson City Depot
- Great Smoky Mountains Railroad, freight and heritage railroad company based in Bryson City
- Sossamon Field, in Bryson City
- Swain Public Transit, providing requested transportation services in county

== Demographics ==
Historical population
Census	Pop.	Note	%±
1880	3,784		—
1890	6,577		73.8%
1900	8,401		27.7%
1910	10,403		23.8%
1920	13,224		27.1%
1930	11,568		−12.5%
1940	12,177		5.3%
1950	9,921		−18.5%
1960	8,387		−15.5%
1970	7,861		−6.3%
1980	10,283		30.8%
1990	11,268		9.6%
2000	12,968		15.1%
2010	13,981		7.8%
2020	14,117		1.0%
2025 (est.)	14,024	▼	−0.7%
U.S. Decennial Census; 1790–1960 1900–1990; 1990–2000 2010 2020

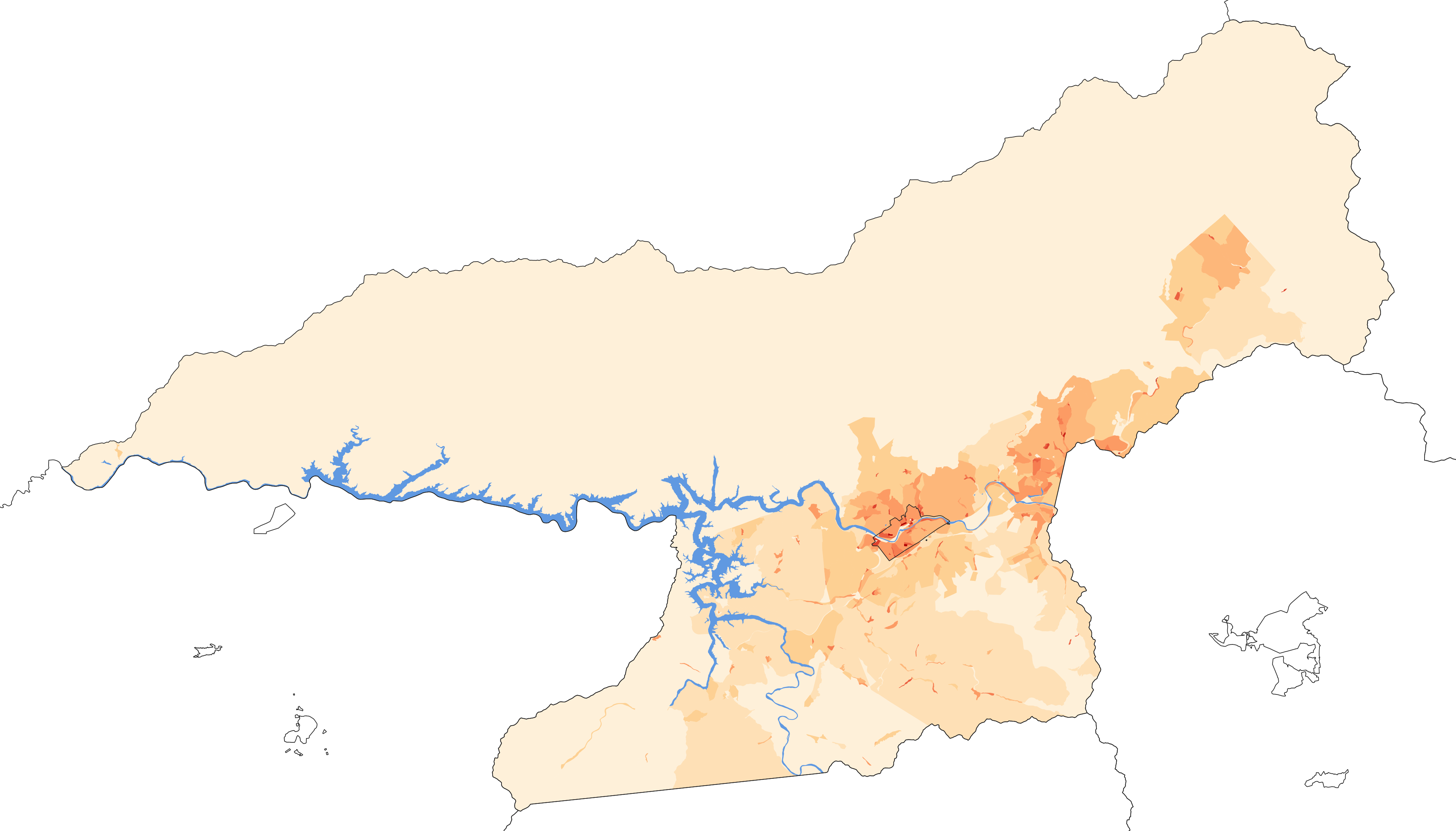
2020 population density of Swain County NC by census block

=== 2020 census ===
As of the 2020 census, there were 14,117 people and 3,615 families residing in the county. The median age was 43.0 years, 22.3% of residents were under the age of 18, and 20.6% of residents were 65 years of age or older. For every 100 females there were 92.4 males, and for every 100 females age 18 and over there were 89.7 males age 18 and over.

There were 5,734 households in the county, of which 27.9% had children under the age of 18 living in them, 42.8% were married-couple households, 20.4% were households with a male householder and no spouse or partner present, and 29.0% were households with a female householder and no spouse or partner present. About 30.5% of all households were made up of individuals and 13.9% had someone living alone who was 65 years of age or older.

There were 8,341 housing units, of which 31.3% were vacant. Among occupied housing units, 72.3% were owner-occupied and 27.7% were renter-occupied. The homeowner vacancy rate was 1.6% and the rental vacancy rate was 12.9%.

The racial makeup of the county was 61.2% White, 0.8% Black or African American, 29.5% American Indian and Alaska Native, 0.4% Asian, 0.1% Native Hawaiian and Pacific Islander, 1.6% from some other race, and 6.4% from two or more races. Hispanic or Latino residents of any race comprised 4.2% of the population.

Less than 0.1% of residents lived in urban areas, while 100.0% lived in rural areas.

=== Racial and ethnic composition ===
Swain County, North Carolina – Racial and ethnic composition Note: the US Census treats Hispanic/Latino as an ethnic category. This table excludes Latinos from the racial categories and assigns them to a separate category. Hispanics/Latinos may be of any race.
Race / Ethnicity (NH = Non-Hispanic)	Pop 1980	Pop 1990	Pop 2000	Pop 2010	Pop 2020	% 1980	% 1990	% 2000	% 2010	% 2020
White alone (NH)	7,637	7,930	8,544	9,168	8,541	74.27%	70.38%	65.89%	65.57%	60.50%
Black or African American alone (NH)	105	191	214	75	102	1.02%	1.70%	1.65%	0.54%	0.72%
Native American or Alaska Native alone (NH)	2,491	3,046	3,711	3,587	4,030	24.22%	27.03%	28.62%	25.66%	28.55%
Asian alone (NH)	10	22	20	66	53	0.10%	0.20%	0.15%	0.47%	0.38%
Native Hawaiian or Pacific Islander alone (NH)	x	x	0	4	10	x	x	0.00%	0.03%	0.07%
Other race alone (NH)	0	1	9	1	44	0.00%	0.01%	0.07%	0.01%	0.31%
Mixed race or Multiracial (NH)	x	x	279	540	745	x	x	2.15%	3.86%	5.28%
Hispanic or Latino (any race)	40	78	191	540	592	0.39%	0.69%	1.47%	3.86%	4.19%
Total	10,283	11,268	12,968	13,981	14,117	100.00%	100.00%	100.00%	100.00%	100.00%

=== 2000 census ===
At the 2000 census, there were 12,968 people, 5,137 households, and 3,631 families residing in the county. The population density was 25 people per square mile (9.7 people/km^{2}). There were 7,105 housing units at an average density of 14 units per square mile (5.4 units/km^{2}). The racial makeup of the county was 66.33% White, 1.70% Black or African American, 29.03% Native American, 0.15% Asian, 0.01% Pacific Islander, 0.49% from other races, and 2.28% from two or more races. 1.47% of the population were Hispanic or Latino of any race. 16.3% were of American, 8.0% Irish, 7.6% Scots-Irish, 6.9% German and 6.6% English ancestry according to Census 2000. 95.2% spoke English, 2.9% Cherokee and 1.3% Spanish as their first language.

There were 5,137 households, out of which 30.00% had children under the age of 18 living with them, 52.30% were married couples living together, 13.90% had a female householder with no husband present, and 29.30% were non-families. 25.80% of all households were made up of individuals, and 11.10% had someone living alone who was 65 years of age or older. The average household size was 2.44 and the average family size was 2.91.

In the county, the population was spread out, with 24.30% under the age of 18, 8.30% from 18 to 24, 26.70% from 25 to 44, 25.40% from 45 to 64, and 15.30% who were 65 years of age or older. The median age was 39 years. For every 100 females there were 94.60 males. For every 100 females age 18 and over, there were 91.20 males.

The median income for a household in the county was $28,608, and the median income for a family was $33,786. Males had a median income of $26,570 versus $20,722 for females. The per capita income for the county was $14,647. About 13.30% of families and 18.30% of the population were below the poverty line, including 25.60% of those under age 18 and 19.10% of those age 65 or over.

== Politics, law and government ==
=== Politics ===
Swain has voted Republican the last six Presidential elections, but historically has been a swing county, with no candidate from either major party obtaining under 37 percent of the county's vote between 1976 and 2012, and no margin larger than twelve percentage points occurring in any election between 1984 and 2012. In 2016 Donald Trump won the county by twenty-three percentage points with the typical strong anti-Democratic swing of most counties in Appalachia, though his margin decreased in the 2020 election. Swain was solidly Democratic during the Third Party System, but the Populist movement dramatically increased the success of progressive Republicans between 1896 and 1928. However, the victory in the county of Progressive Party candidate Theodore Roosevelt in 1912 and subsequent dominance of liberal Democrats like Franklin D. Roosevelt and Adlai Stevenson suggest that the county's voters were drawn more to the relatively progressive agendas of these candidates than they were to any party label.

United States presidential election results for Swain County, North Carolina
Year	Republican		Democratic		Third party(ies)	
Year	No.	%	No.	%	No.	%
1912	220	11.93%	766	41.54%	858	46.53%
1916	1,128	57.64%	829	42.36%	0	0.00%
1920	2,239	60.96%	1,434	39.04%	0	0.00%
1924	2,178	54.85%	1,769	44.55%	24	0.60%
1928	2,484	59.04%	1,723	40.96%	0	0.00%
1932	1,893	43.78%	2,412	55.78%	19	0.44%
1936	2,084	44.31%	2,619	55.69%	0	0.00%
1940	1,425	37.04%	2,422	62.96%	0	0.00%
1944	1,505	41.63%	2,110	58.37%	0	0.00%
1948	1,389	41.25%	1,908	56.67%	70	2.08%
1952	1,680	46.29%	1,949	53.71%	0	0.00%
1956	2,026	53.04%	1,794	46.96%	0	0.00%
1960	2,112	49.31%	2,171	50.69%	0	0.00%
1964	1,534	40.07%	2,294	59.93%	0	0.00%
1968	1,494	45.86%	1,227	37.66%	537	16.48%
1972	2,052	64.45%	1,101	34.58%	31	0.97%
1976	1,608	42.64%	2,151	57.04%	12	0.32%
1980	1,457	41.39%	1,987	56.45%	76	2.16%
1984	2,012	50.02%	2,000	49.73%	10	0.25%
1988	1,795	49.52%	1,821	50.23%	9	0.25%
1992	1,640	37.88%	2,117	48.89%	573	13.23%
1996	1,444	38.80%	1,869	50.21%	409	10.99%
2000	2,224	50.89%	2,097	47.99%	49	1.12%
2004	2,593	51.41%	2,419	47.96%	32	0.63%
2008	2,900	50.02%	2,806	48.40%	92	1.59%
2012	2,976	51.96%	2,618	45.71%	134	2.34%
2016	3,565	58.21%	2,196	35.86%	363	5.93%
2020	4,161	58.87%	2,780	39.33%	127	1.80%
2024	4,311	61.13%	2,643	37.48%	98	1.39%

=== County government ===
==== Board of Commissioners ====
Swain County is governed by an elected Board of Commissioners. The County Manager oversees the day-to-day management of the county and supervises the administration of all County offices, departments, boards, commissions and agencies. The county manager attends all meetings of the Board of Commissioners, recommends measures that he considers expedient, and executes decisions made by the Board. As of 2024, Swain County has the lowest per-capita tax levy in the state – $535 per person – and the second lowest total levy ($7.4 million in tax revenue).

Swain County is a member of the regional Southwestern Commission council of governments.

==== Qualla Boundary government ====
The town of Cherokee is within the Qualla Boundary, land purchased by the Eastern Band of Cherokee Indians in the 1870s. It has its own government, consisting of an elected chief and elected council members from each community within the tribe. The tribe is considered sovereign and only adheres to its own laws and the laws of the federal government. This allows the town of Cherokee to have a casino, despite casinos being outlawed in North Carolina. This was conditional on the adoption of a tribal-state gaming compact agreed to by both the tribe and the state, as well as approved by the federal government.

=== Policing and law enforcement ===
The Swain County Sheriff provides court protection, jail administration, patrol and detective services for the unincorporated areas of the county. Bryson City has a municipal police department.

== Education ==
Swain County Schools serves all of the county except for the part in the Qualla Boundary, which is in Cherokee Central Schools. Swain County High School serves the former and Cherokee Central High School serves the latter. Native American students who live anywhere in Swain County may choose to attend Swain County Schools or Cherokee Central Schools. Likewise, students that live on the Jackson County side of the Qualla Boundary may choose to attend Cherokee Central Schools or Jackson County Schools (Smoky Mountain Elementary in Whittier and Smoky Mountain High School in Sylva).

== Media ==
The Smoky Mountain Times is published in Bryson City. In 1889 and 1890 the community was served by the Swain County Herald.

== Communities ==
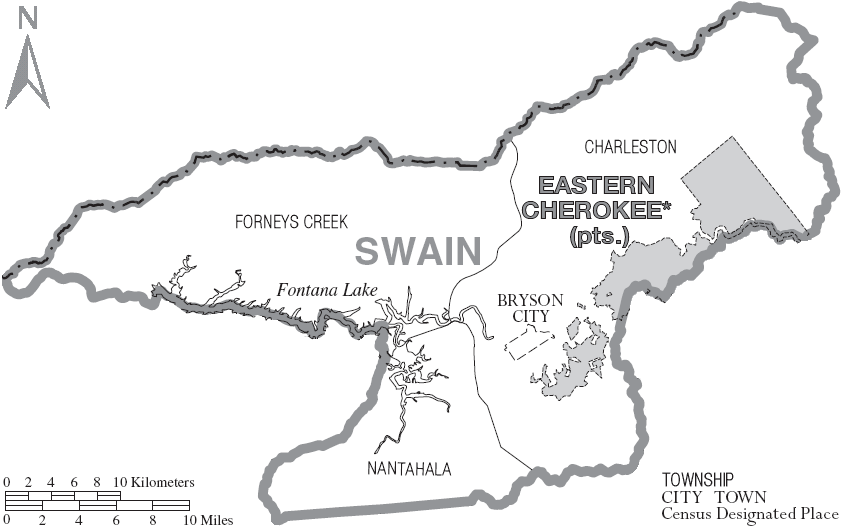
Map of Swain County with municipal and township labels

=== Town ===
- Bryson City (county seat)

=== Census-designated places ===
- Cherokee (largest community; capital of the Eastern Band of Cherokee Indians within the Qualla Boundary)
- Whittier

=== Unincorporated communities ===
- Almond
- Deals Gap
- Ela
- Hewitt
- Lauada
- Ravensford
- Wesser

=== Townships ===
- Charleston
- Forneys Creek
- Nantahala

== See also ==
- List of counties in North Carolina
- National Register of Historic Places listings in Swain County, North Carolina
- Great Smoky Mountains Expressway
