= Bryson City Island Park =

Municipal park in Bryson City, North Carolina, U.S.

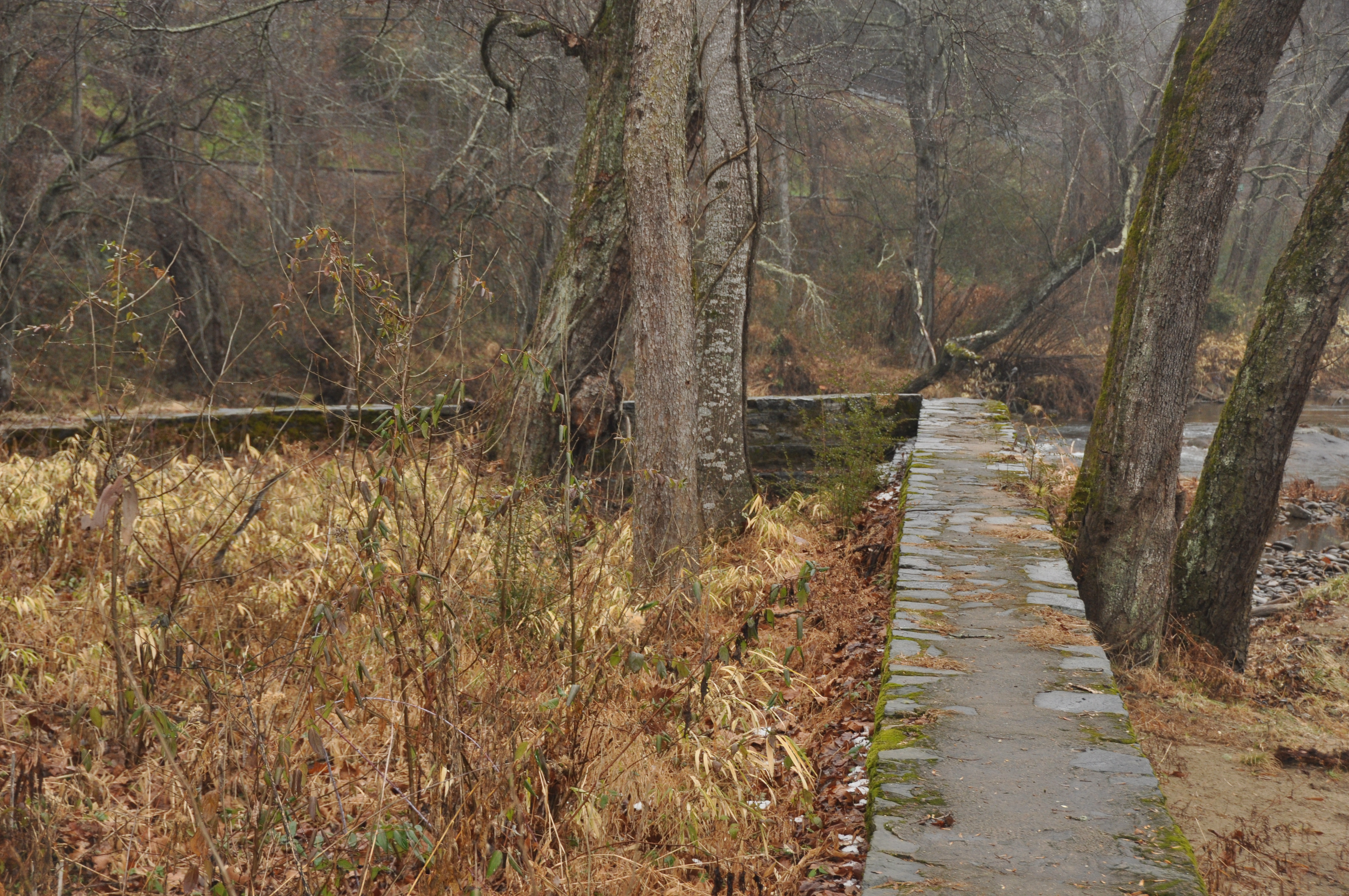
- East Facing Flood Wall
- Interactive map of Bryson City Island Park
- Type: Urban park
- Location: Bryson City, North Carolina
- Coordinates: 35°25′54.54″N 83°26′31.51″W
- Area: 4.8 acres (1.9 ha)
- Owner: Town of Bryson City
- Operator: Swain County Parks & Rec

The Bryson City Island Park is a small island located in Bryson City, North Carolina, United States. Located within the Tuckasegee River, at the mouth of historic Deep Creek, which flows from the Great Smoky Mountains National Park.

== Location ==
The Bryson City Island Park is located in the Tuckaseegee River in Bryson City, the county seat of Swain County, at the intersection of Bryson City and Ramseur streets.

== History ==
The Island Park was renewed in the 1980s and serves as a recreational destination for tourists and locals alike. The trails were created by Bryson City resident R.T. (Buddy) Abbott, to whom the park is dedicated.

The Island Park was long accessible by a swinging, wooden footbridge across the Tuckasegee River from the center of the Bryson City business district. In 2005, the island suffered damage from winds and severe flooding from Hurricane Katrina. The island had to be closed to the public for several years.

In 2008, a new, fixed concrete bridge was erected to replace the old swinging bridge. A kayaking slalom course was created on the island that makes use of the white water rapids, most notably the "Devil's Dip" rapid. For a period, Island Park was the site of the Bryson City Fire Department's annual walk through "Haunted Halloween island", a well-known fundraiser.

== Activities ==
Bryson City Island Park is a destination for fresh water anglers, picnickers, kayakers, tourists, hikers, commercial rafting companies, bird watchers, and nature enthusiasts.

=== Angling ===
Anglers enjoy the waters around the island park because of the wide variety of fish species, including brown trout, rainbow trout, brook trout, carp, red horses, small and large mouth bass, catfish, white bass, walleye, and rock bass. Several companies offer private trips on the river for fishing enthusiasts. As in all public waters in North Carolina, both natural and artificial lures are allowed. With the exception of a limit of seven trout, there are no limits on catches.

=== Recreation ===
The park's secluded, unspoiled landscape attracts picnickers, hikers, and wildlife spotters. The official bird of the state of North Carolina, the Cardinal, nests on the island during certain parts of the year. The park offers roughly ten picnic tables along with trash cans and recycling bins. The park offers roughly a mile of dirt trails that circle around the island and through its center. Historic Deep Creek, flowing from the Great Smoky Mountains National Park into the Tuckaseegee, has its mouth across from Island Park.

== Preservation and future ==
In 2005, Bryson City secured two $50,000 grants to be used for introducing some local fauna to the island park. The town intends to improve and add to the island's walking paths and gardens. It may build an outdoor amphitheater on the island, to add to the park as a "beautiful, natural focal point in the heart of Bryson City".
