= Thomas Hyatt House =

Historic house in Connecticut, United States

- U.S. National Register of Historic Places
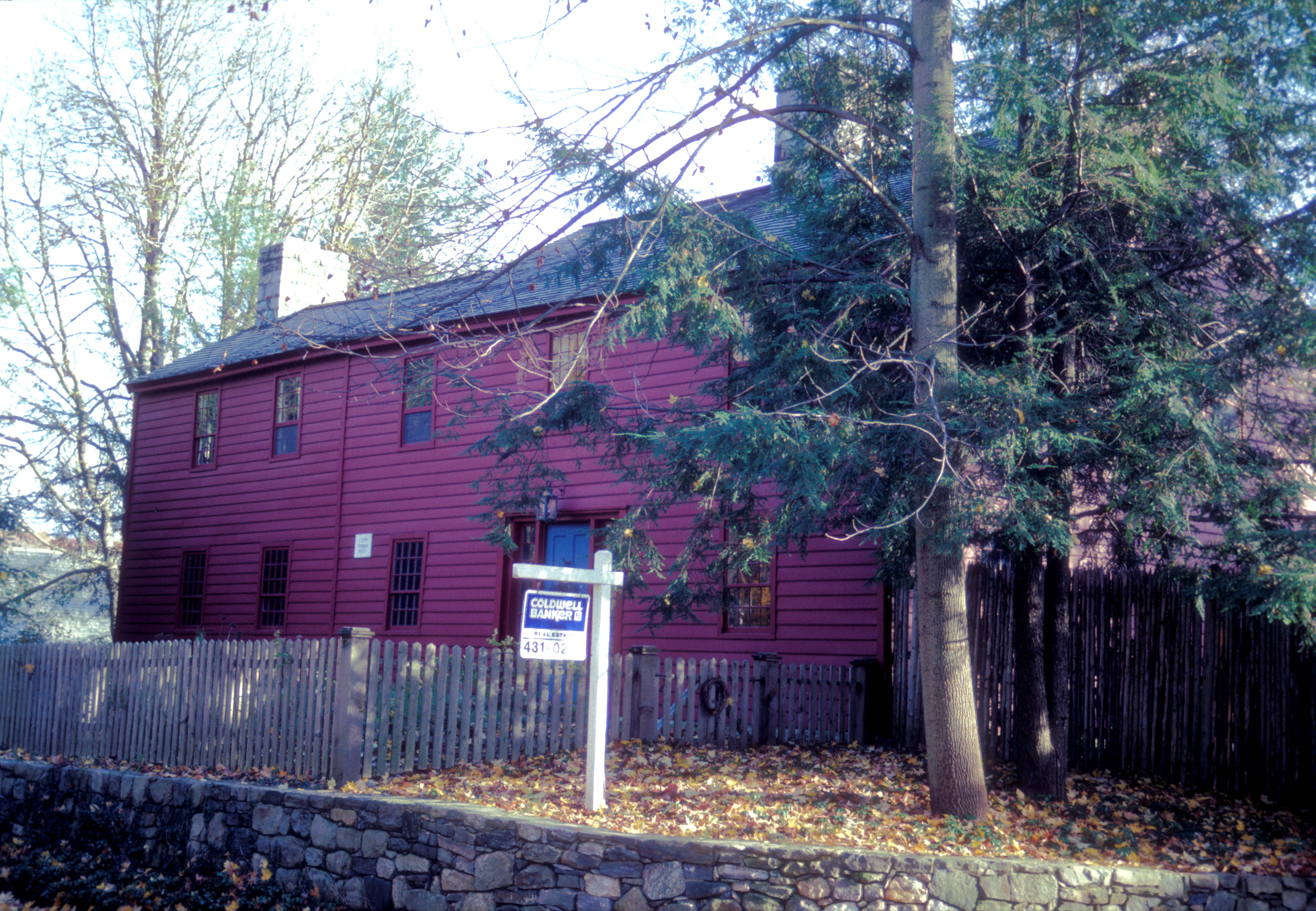

- Location within Connecticut Location within the United States
- Location: 11 Barlow Mountain Road, Ridgefield, Connecticut
- Coordinates: 41°19′10.2″N 73°30′38.7″W
- Area: 2.5 acres (1.0 ha)
- Built: ca. 1735
- Architect: Hyatt, Thomas
- Architectural style: Colonial
- NRHP reference No.: 84000793
- Added to NRHP: February 16, 1984

The Thomas Hyatt House, also known as the Cashman House, is a Colonial style house at 11 Barlow Mountain Road in Ridgefield, Connecticut. Built about 1735, it is one of the community's oldest and best-preserved houses, retaining much of its original layout and features. It was listed on the National Register of Historic Places in 1984.

== Description and history ==
The Thomas Hyatt House is located in a rural residential setting north of Ridgefield's village center, on the south side of Barlow Mountain Road just east of the Titicus River. It is a 2 1/2-story wood-frame structure, five bays wide, with a side-gable roof and a central chimney. When built c. 1735 by Thomas Hyatt, the house was three bays in width; the building was widened later in the 18th century, and a rear ell was added in the 20th century. The building retains a significant amount of its original 18th-century woodwork, and is one of the least-altered 18th-century houses in Ridgefield.

Thomas Hyatt, the builder of the house, was a prominent local figure in colonial Ridgefield. He served on a boundary commission checking the town's border with Danbury, and served in the American Revolutionary War, as did his son Thomas Jr. The house remained in the Hyatt family until 1832. The principal alteration to the structure has been the lowering of some of its ground-level floors in order to accommodate a particularly large cabinet belonging to the Cashman family, who oversaw a major restoration of the property.

== See also ==
- National Register of Historic Places listings in Fairfield County, Connecticut
