= Cherokee Central Schools =

School district in North Carolina, United States

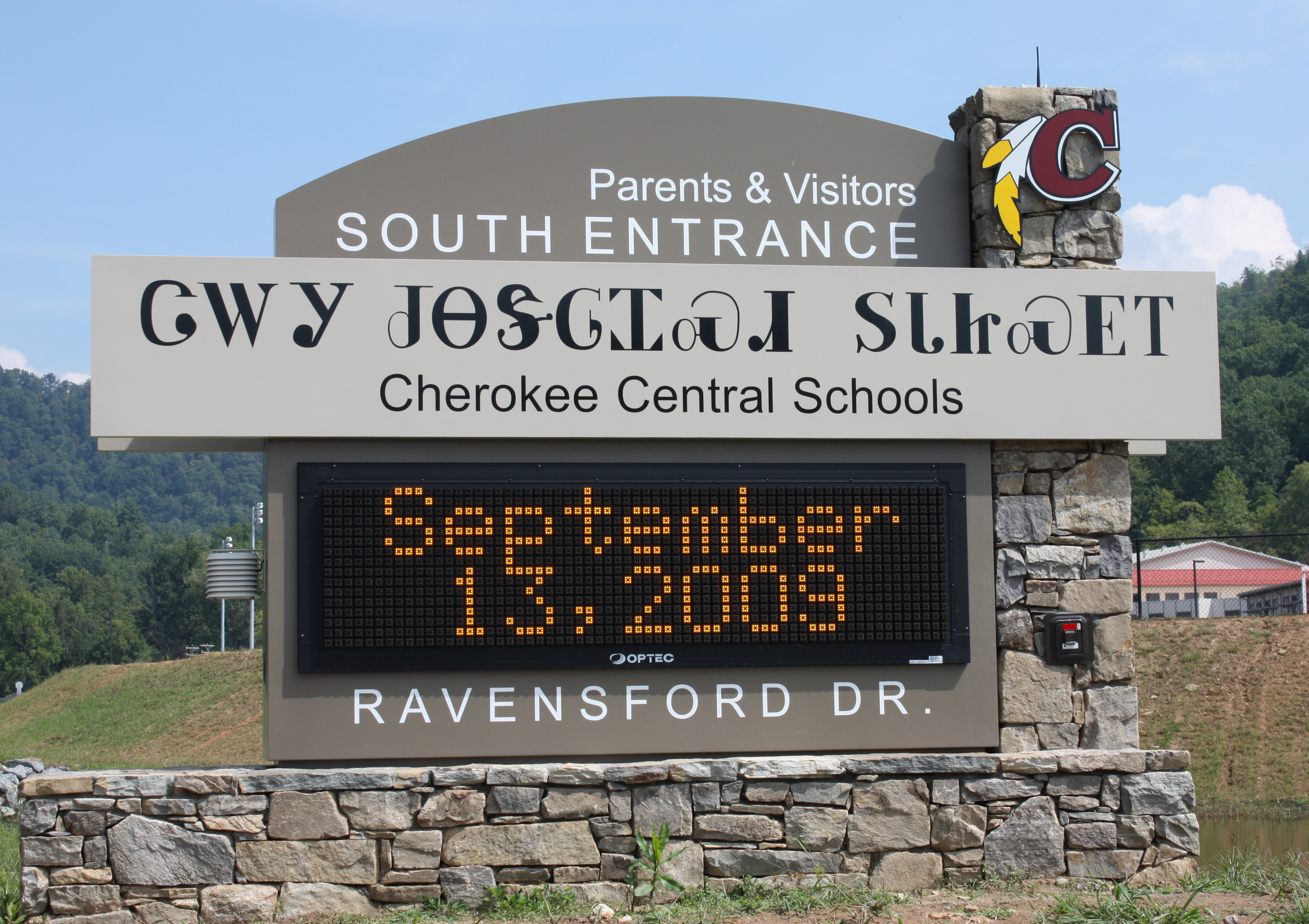
Entrance to the Cherokee Central Schools compound

Cherokee Central Schools (Cherokee: ᏣᎳᎩ ᏧᎾᏕᎶᏆᏍᏗ ᏚᏓᏥᏍᎬᎢ, romanized: tsalagi tsunadeloquasdi dudatsisgvi) is a school district in Cherokee, North Carolina, consisting of a single campus holding buildings serving grades K-12 and the administration office. The schools are a K-5 elementary school, a 6-8 middle school, and a 9-12 high school (Cherokee High School). The Ravensford Campus, the academic campus, occupies much of the historic Ravensford archaeological site. In 1987–88, the elementary school was recognized as a Blue Ribbon School.

It geographically covers the Qualla Boundary, the Eastern Band Cherokee reserve, both in Swain County and in Jackson County.

Its campuses operate under association with the Bureau of Indian Education (BIE).

== Operations ==
The district has its own school board. By 1996 the school board contracted with the Cherokee Boys' Club, which operated the school district's finances, cafeterias, and school buses.
