= Bryson City, North Carolina =

Bryson City, North Carolina ᏣᎵᏍᏙᏂ (tsahlsdoni)
- Town
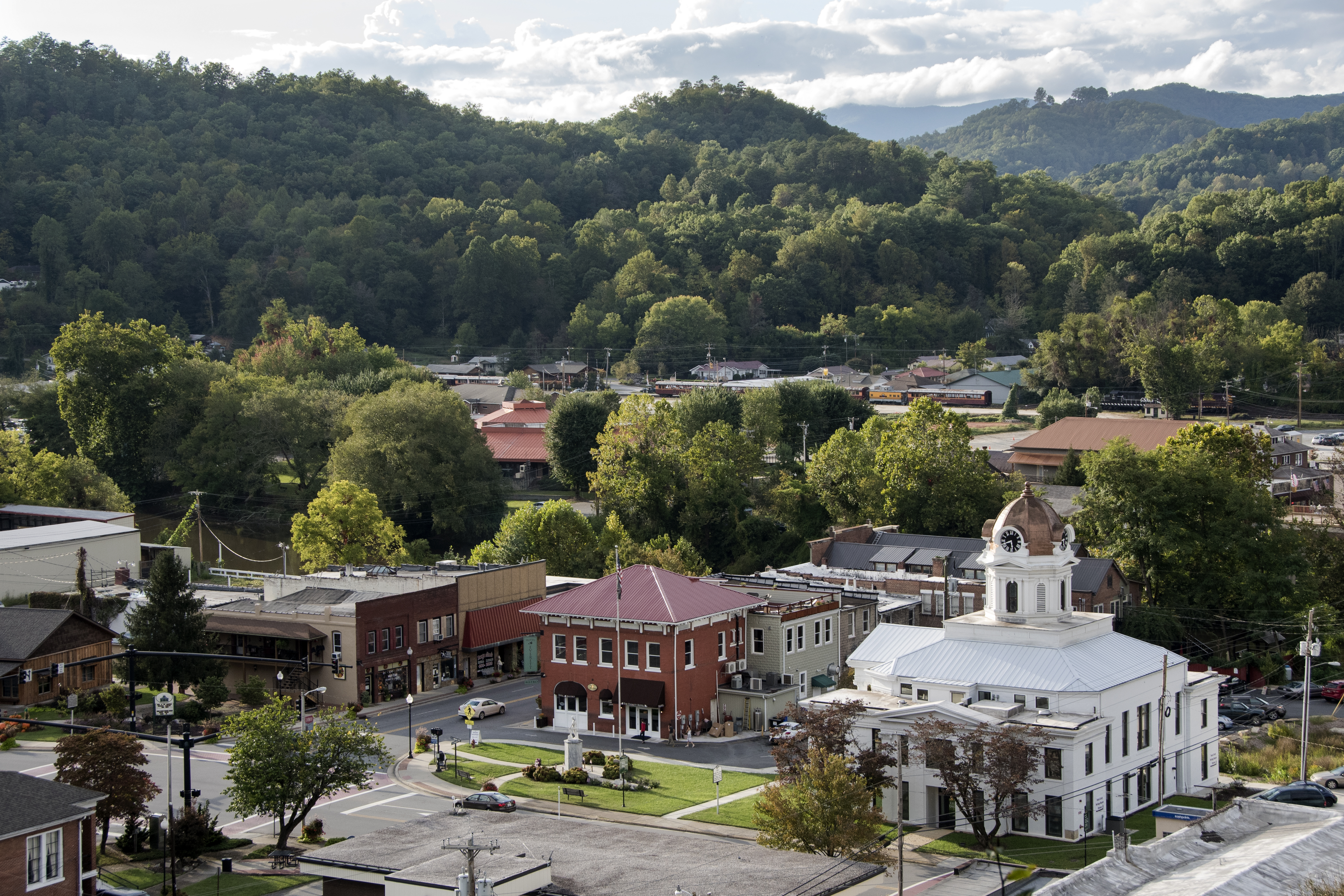
- Downtown Bryson City

- Location within North Carolina Location within the United States
- Coordinates: 35°25′34″N 83°26′51″W
- Country: United States
- State: North Carolina
- County: Swain
- Named for: Thaddeus Dillard Bryson

Area
  - Total: 2.29 sq mi (5.94 km^{2})
  - Land: 2.19 sq mi (5.66 km^{2})
  - Water: 0.11 sq mi (0.28 km^{2})
- Elevation: 1,752 ft (534 m)

Population (2020)
  - Total: 1,558
  - Density: 713.5/sq mi (275.48/km^{2})
- Time zone: UTC-5 (Eastern (EST))
  - Summer (DST): UTC-4 (EDT)
- ZIP code: 28713
- Area code: 828
- FIPS code: 37-08480
- GNIS feature ID: 2405339
- Website: www.brysoncitync.gov

Bryson City (Cherokee: ᏣᎵᏍᏙᏂ, romanized: Tsahlsdoni) is a town in Swain County, North Carolina, United States, and its county seat. The population was 1,558 as of the 2020 census. Located in what was historically the land of the Cherokee, Bryson City was founded as Charleston to serve as the county seat of Swain County when it was formed from parts of surrounding counties. It grew into an important local rail hub. Today the city serves as a popular tourist destination, lying just to the west of the entrance to the Great Smoky Mountains National Park, for outdoor activities in the Nantahala National Forest, and along the Nantahala River and Fontana Lake, and serves as the home of the Great Smoky Mountains Railroad, a heritage railroad that provides tours of the Nantahala valley. The popular Nantahala Outdoor Center provides guide services for many of the outdoor activities in the area.

== History ==
=== Indigenous settlements ===
Indigenous cultures of Native Americans have been living and hunting along the Tuckasegee River in the vicinity of what is now Bryson City for nearly 14,000 years. The village of Kituwa, which the Cherokee believed to be their oldest village and "mother town", was located along the Tuckasegee River. The ancient mound and village site is now controlled again by the federally recognized Eastern Band of Cherokee Indians and is preserved as a sacred site. (Bryson City developed downstream from this site.)

In 1567, an orata (minor chief) from Kituwa is believed to have met with Spanish explorer Juan Pardo in the French Broad Valley to the north. During the American Revolutionary War, many Cherokee allied with the British, hoping to expel European Americans from their territory. American soldiers burned and destroyed the town of Kituwa in 1776, but the Cherokee continued to hold annual ceremonial dances at the site throughout the 19th century.

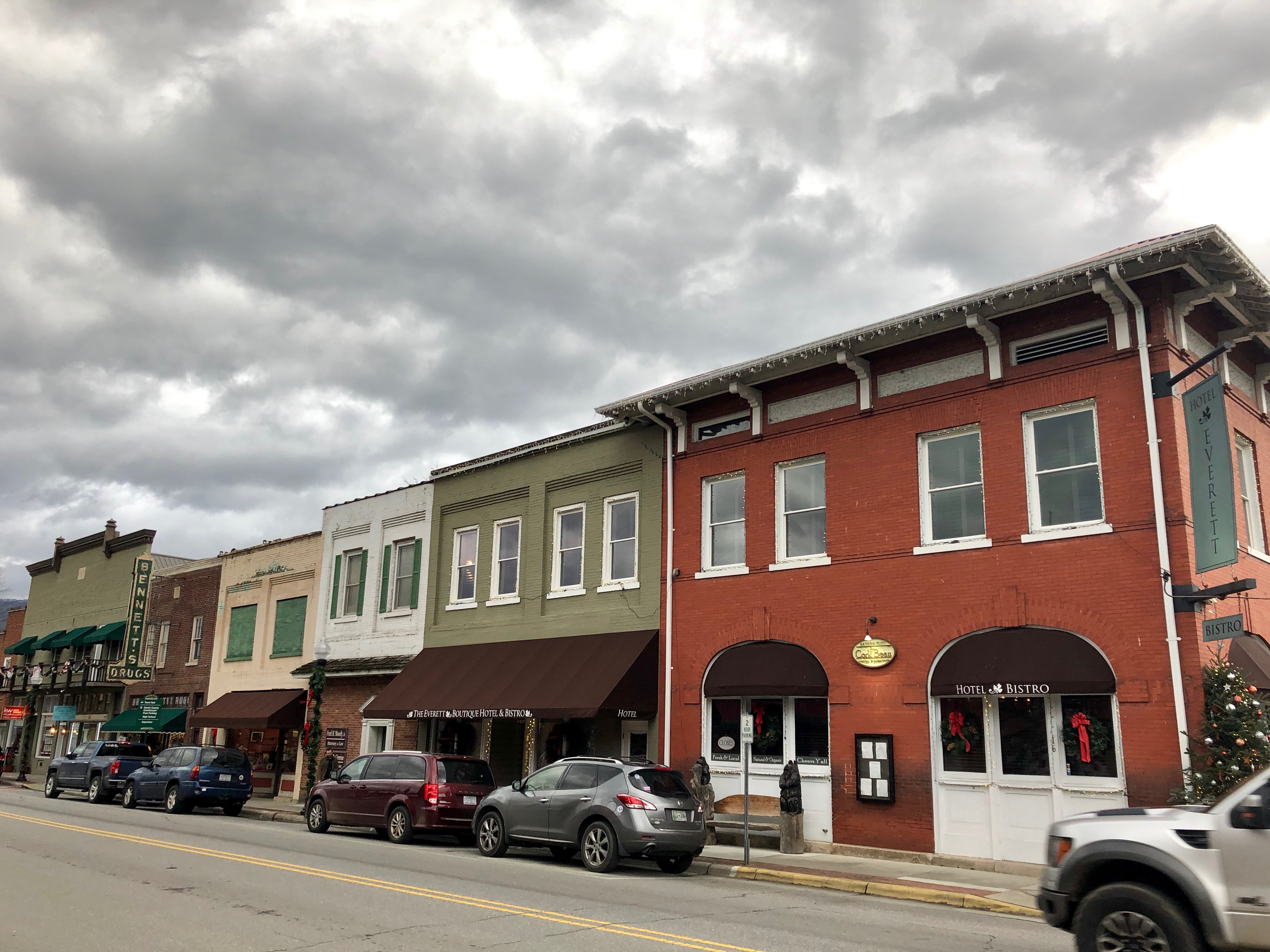
Buildings on Everett Street

Around 1818, a Cherokee chief known as Big Bear received a 640-acre (2.6 km^{2}) reservation of land immediately west of the confluence of Deep Creek and the Tuckasegee River. Big Bear sold part of his reservation to Darling Belk in 1819 and another part to John B. Love in 1824. Throughout the 1830s, Belk's heirs and Love fought an extended legal battle over control of the former Big Bear land, with Love finally prevailing in 1840. The following year, Love sold part of the land to James and Diana Shuler. The Shulers, in turn, sold parts of their land to Colonel Thaddeus Bryson and merchant Alfred Cline. A small hamlet known as Bear Springs developed on what was once Big Bear's reservation.

=== Contemporary history ===
With its population having increased, Swain County was formed from parts of Jackson and Macon counties in 1871, during the Reconstruction era. The new commissioners first met at Cline's store at Bear Springs. Lucy Ann (Raby) Cline agreed to sell several lots of her land to form a county seat. Initially known as Charleston, the county seat was laid out in a T-shape, formed by what are now Main and Everett streets (the latter street was named for the county's first sheriff, Epp Everett). The first Swain County Courthouse was completed in 1874. In 1872, shortly after completion of the new jail, a gang led by Harvey Cooper stormed the jail and freed Tom Colvert, whom they deemed unjustly imprisoned for killing a rival at a saloon in Robbinsville.

In 1889, the people of Charleston changed the city's name to "Bryson City" to acknowledge the role of Thaddeus Bryson in its development, and to eliminate confusion from sharing a name with Charleston, South Carolina. The Western North Carolina Railroad laid tracks through Bryson City in 1884, greatly improving transportation to the previously isolated area. The Bryson City Bank opened in 1904. The current Swain County Courthouse was completed in 1908, replacing the former one.

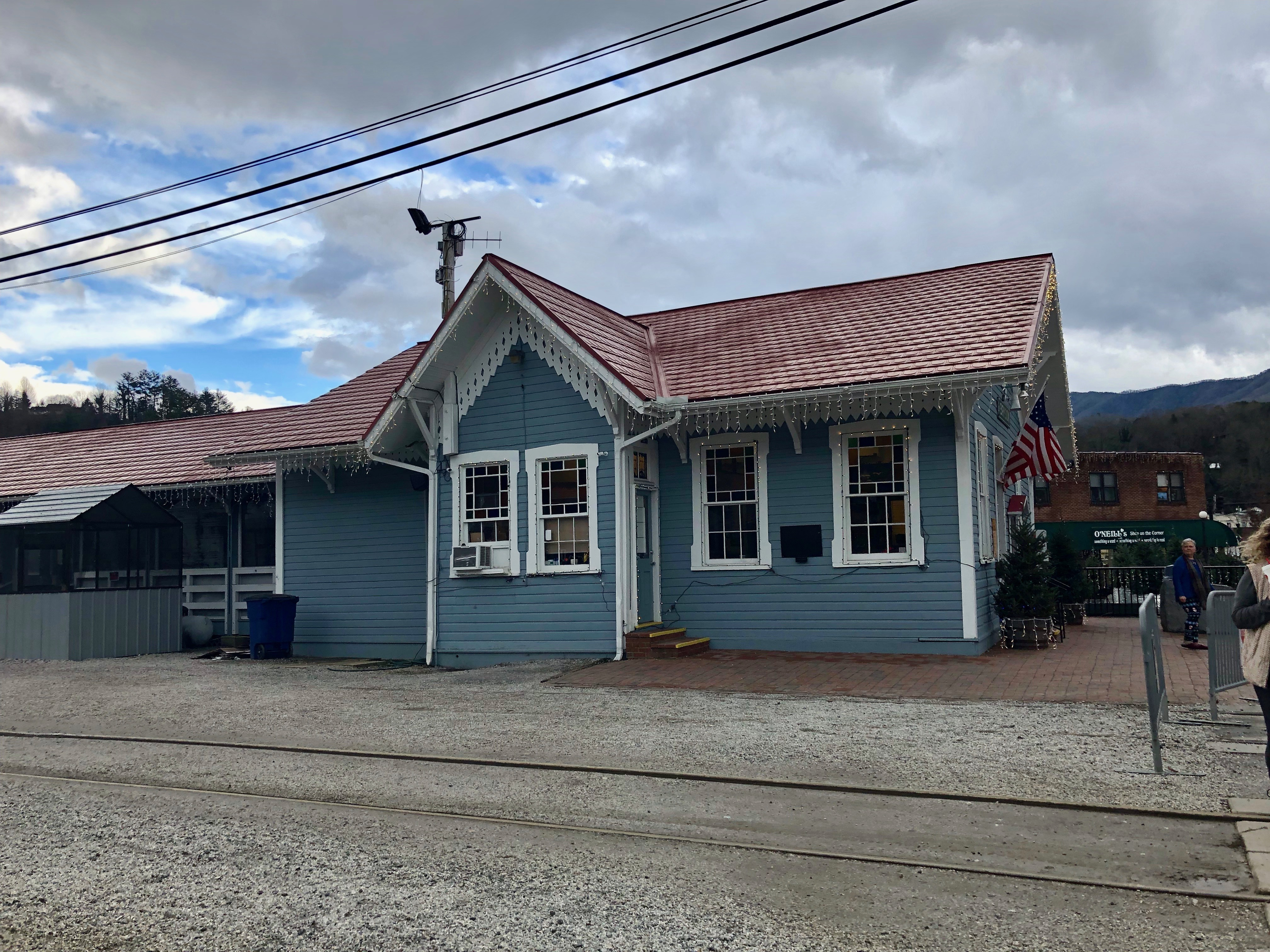
Bryson City Depot

The Great Smoky Mountains National Park, which was established in 1933 during the Great Depression, generates considerable revenue to for Swain County. Horace Kephart, an author and outdoors enthusiast who was based in Bryson City for several years, was a key early proponent for creation of the park. The Deep Creek section of the park, which is immediately north of Bryson City, has a large campground and multiple trailheads. The park's main eastern entrance is located just a few miles east of Bryson City at Cherokee. Cherokee is the southern terminus of the Blue Ridge Parkway. It is also the base of the Eastern Band of Cherokee Indians, the only federally recognized tribe in North Carolina. Many are descendants of Cherokee who avoided removal in the late 1830s.

The completion of Fontana Dam in 1944 created a reservoir, which inundated the only highway connecting Bryson City with the remote area of the Smokies known as the North Shore. The U.S. government began constructing a new highway in 1948, now known as Lakeview Drive, but it was slow. By 1972, only 7 miles (11 km) had been completed. Environmental and financial issues stalled the project, and the road became known to locals as "The Road to Nowhere".

In 2007, the National Park Service deemed the road's construction to be in violation of the Great Smoky Mountains National Park's general management plan, and began working with Swain County to find an alternative.

The increasing usage of the automobile led to a decline in railroad transportation, and Southern Railway (which had replaced the Western North Carolina Railroad) dropped passenger service in 1948. After Norfolk Southern ended freight traffic on the railroad in 1985, the state of North Carolina purchased the tracks. In 1988, the state established a scenic line, known as the Great Smoky Mountains Railroad, with its depot and departure point in Bryson City.

In 2015, the city's first FM station was launched. WTIJ-LP (100.7) broadcasts local and nationally syndicated ministers, and Christian music. The station is owned by Grace Christian Academy and broadcasts over the air and online 24/7.

== Geography ==
Bryson City is located just west of the confluence of the Tuckasegee River, which flows westward from its source in the mountains to the east, and Deep Creek, which flows south from its source near Newfound Gap in the Great Smoky Mountains. After flowing around the Bryson City Island Park, and passing through Bryson City, the Tuckasegee flows southwestward for another 12 miles (19 km) before emptying into the Little Tennessee River. Fontana Lake, an impoundment of the Little Tennessee, covers the lower 11 miles (18 km) of the Tuckasegee.

The town is surrounded on all sides by mountains. The Great Smoky Mountains rise to the north, the Cowee Mountains rise to the south, and the Plott Balsams rise to the east. The boundary of the Nantahala National Forest passes just south of the city, and the boundary of the Great Smoky Mountains National Park passes just to the north. The Qualla Boundary, which comprises the bulk of the reservation of the Eastern Band of Cherokee Indians, dominates the area to the east.

Bryson City is centered around the junction of Everett Street and Main Street. Main Street is part of U.S. Route 19, which connects Bryson City to Cherokee to the northeast and Murphy to the southwest.

According to the United States Census Bureau, the town has a total area of 2.2 square miles (5.7 km^{2}), of which 2.1 square miles (5.4 km^{2}) is land and 0.1 square miles (0.26 km^{2}) (5.33%) is water.

== Climate ==
Climate data for BRYSON CITY 4, NC, 1991-2020 normals
Month	Jan	Feb	Mar	Apr	May	Jun	Jul	Aug	Sep	Oct	Nov	Dec	Year
Mean daily maximum °F (°C)	47.7 (8.7)	51.8 (11.0)	59.9 (15.5)	68.8 (20.4)	75.0 (23.9)	80.3 (26.8)	83.6 (28.7)	83.0 (28.3)	78.2 (25.7)	69.7 (20.9)	59.9 (15.5)	50.4 (10.2)	67.4 (19.7)
Daily mean °F (°C)	36.9 (2.7)	40.2 (4.6)	47.0 (8.3)	55.4 (13.0)	63.0 (17.2)	69.9 (21.1)	73.3 (22.9)	72.6 (22.6)	67.3 (19.6)	56.9 (13.8)	47.1 (8.4)	39.9 (4.4)	55.8 (13.2)
Mean daily minimum °F (°C)	26.0 (−3.3)	28.5 (−1.9)	34.1 (1.2)	42.0 (5.6)	51.0 (10.6)	59.5 (15.3)	63.0 (17.2)	62.2 (16.8)	56.4 (13.6)	44.1 (6.7)	34.3 (1.3)	29.3 (−1.5)	44.2 (6.8)
Average precipitation inches (mm)	5.26 (134)	5.31 (135)	5.44 (138)	4.96 (126)	5.20 (132)	5.06 (129)	5.06 (129)	4.38 (111)	4.08 (104)	3.21 (82)	4.50 (114)	6.14 (156)	58.60 (1,488)
Source: NOAA

== Demographics ==
Historical population
Census	Pop.	Note	%±
1900	417		—
1910	612		46.8%
1920	882		44.1%
1930	1,806		104.8%
1940	1,612		−10.7%
1950	1,499		−7.0%
1960	1,084		−27.7%
1970	1,290		19.0%
1980	1,556		20.6%
1990	1,145		−26.4%
2000	1,411		23.2%
2010	1,424		0.9%
2020	1,558		9.4%
2022 (est.)	1,525	▼	−2.1%
U.S. Decennial Census

=== Racial and ethnic composition ===
Bryson City, town, North Carolina – Racial and ethnic composition Note: the US Census treats Hispanic/Latino as an ethnic category. This table excludes Latinos from the racial categories and assigns them to a separate category. Hispanics/Latinos may be of any race.
Race / Ethnicity (NH = Non-Hispanic)	Pop 2000	Pop 2010	Pop 2020	% 2000	% 2010	% 2020
White alone (NH)	1,273	1,240	1,264	90.22%	87.08%	81.13%
Black or African American alone (NH)	23	7	47	1.63%	0.49%	3.02%
Native American or Alaska Native alone (NH)	69	67	86	4.89%	4.71%	5.52%
Asian alone (NH)	5	8	10	0.35%	0.56%	0.64%
Native Hawaiian or Pacific Islander alone (NH)	0	0	1	0.00%	0.00%	0.06%
Other race alone (NH)	1	0	3	0.07%	0.00%	0.19%
Mixed race or Multiracial (NH)	16	25	68	1.13%	1.76%	4.36%
Hispanic or Latino (any race)	24	77	79	1.70%	5.41%	5.07%
Total	1,411	1,424	1,558	100.00%	100.00%	100.00%

=== 2020 census ===
As of the 2020 census, Bryson City had a population of 1,558. The median age was 46.2 years. 18.2% of residents were under the age of 18 and 25.2% of residents were 65 years of age or older. For every 100 females there were 78.9 males, and for every 100 females age 18 and over there were 74.7 males age 18 and over.

0.0% of residents lived in urban areas, while 100.0% lived in rural areas.

There were 621 households in Bryson City, of which 24.5% had children under the age of 18 living in them. Of all households, 33.2% were married-couple households, 23.3% were households with a male householder and no spouse or partner present, and 37.2% were households with a female householder and no spouse or partner present. About 43.5% of all households were made up of individuals and 19.4% had someone living alone who was 65 years of age or older.

There were 836 housing units, of which 25.7% were vacant. The homeowner vacancy rate was 1.6% and the rental vacancy rate was 12.6%.

=== 2000 census ===
As of the census of 2000, there were 1,411 people, 588 households, and 323 families residing in the town. The population density was 663.5 inhabitants per square mile (256.2/km^{2}). There were 713 housing units at an average density of 335.3 per square mile (129.5/km^{2}). The racial makeup of the town was 90.93% White, 1.98% African American, 4.96% Native American, 0.35% Asian, 0.64% from other races, and 1.13% from two or more races. Hispanic or Latino of any race were 1.70% of the population.

There were 588 households, out of which 21.8% had children under the age of 18 living with them, 38.1% were married couples living together, 12.8% had a female householder with no husband present, and 44.9% were non-families. 41.3% of all households were made up of individuals, and 20.7% had someone living alone who was 65 years of age or older. The average household size was 2.09 and the average family size was 2.78.

In the town, the population was spread out, with 17.6% under the age of 18, 5.9% from 18 to 24, 24.9% from 25 to 44, 24.5% from 45 to 64, and 27.1% who were 65 years of age or older. The median age was 46 years. For every 100 females, there were 77.9 males. For every 100 females age 18 and over, there were 78.2 males.

The median income for a household in the town was $23,232, and the median income for a family was $31,875. Males had a median income of $26,528 versus $19,833 for females. The per capita income for the town was $14,446. About 14.8% of families and 19.2% of the population were below the poverty line, including 25.4% of those under age 18 and 21.0% of those age 65 or over.

== Infrastructure ==
There is a federal building and federal courthouse in Bryson City. The courthouse is in the jurisdiction of the United States District Court for the Western District of North Carolina.

== Education ==
Swain County Schools is the local school district. Swain County High School is the local high school.

== In popular culture ==
- Cormac McCarthy has his title character in his novel Suttree (1979), spend time in Bryson City.
- A scene with Harrison Ford for the film The Fugitive (1993) was shot in downtown Bryson City.
- In the game Railroader (2022), Bryson City is represented with a yard and station.

== Notable people ==
- Horace Kephart – outdoorsman and author
- Jerry Reed – pitcher for the Seattle Mariners
- Franklin Paul Rogers – tattoo artist
- Heath Shuler – professional football player; North Carolina Congressman
- Red Smiley – bluegrass musician
- Ellen Black Winston – first United States Commissioner of Welfare
- The Inspirations – Southern Gospel Quartet
