= U.S. Route 74 =

Highway in the United States

U.S. Route 74
- US 74 highlighted in red

Route information
- Length: 515 mi (829 km)
- Existed: 1927–present
- Tourist routes: Ocoee Scenic Byway; Mountain Waters Scenic Byway

Major junctions
- West end: I-24 / I-75 at Chattanooga, TN
- I-75 in Cleveland, TN; I-40 near Asheville, NC; I-26 near Columbus, NC; I-85 / US 29 in Kings Mountain, NC; I-485 in Charlotte, NC; I-77 / US 21 in Charlotte, NC; I-277 in Charlotte, NC; US 1 in Rockingham, NC; I-95 / US 301 near Lumberton, NC; I-140 in Leland, NC
- East end: Lumina Avenue in Wrightsville Beach, NC

Location
- Country: United States
- States: Tennessee, North Carolina
- Counties: TN: Hamilton, Bradley, Polk; NC: Cherokee, Macon, Swain, Jackson, Haywood, Buncombe, Henderson, Polk, Rutherford, Cleveland, Gaston, Mecklenburg, Union, Anson, Richmond, Scotland, Robeson, Columbus, Brunswick, New Hanover

Highway system
- United States Numbered Highway System; List; Special; Divided
| ← US 73 | US | → US 75 |
| ← SR 73 | TN | → SR 74 |
| ← I-74 | NC | → NC 75 |

U.S. Route 74 (US 74) is an east–west United States highway that runs for 515 miles (829 km) from Chattanooga, Tennessee to Wrightsville Beach, North Carolina. Primarily in North Carolina, it serves as an important highway from the mountains to the sea, connecting the cities of Asheville, Charlotte and Wilmington. It is known as Andrew Jackson Highway throughout most of North Carolina.

== Route description ==
Lengths
| | mi | km |
|---|---|---|
| TN | 63.0 | 101.4 |
| NC | 451.8 | 727.1 |
| Total | 514.8 | 828.5 |

=== Tennessee ===
US 74 was designated in 1927. The 63-mile (101 km) route travels from the I-24/I-75 interchange, in Chattanooga, northeast to Cleveland, where it then continues east, along with US 64, to the North Carolina state line. The highway is predominantly freeway or expressway grade four-lane, except between Ocoee and Ducktown, where it is a curvy two-lane mountain highway along the Ocoee River known as the Ocoee Scenic Byway.

TDOT's signage for US 74 is poor. Most highways that cross it will typically only list I-75 or US 64 instead; I-75 completely ignores US 74 along its route, even ignoring it at their intersection, showing instead the US 64 Bypass.

=== North Carolina ===
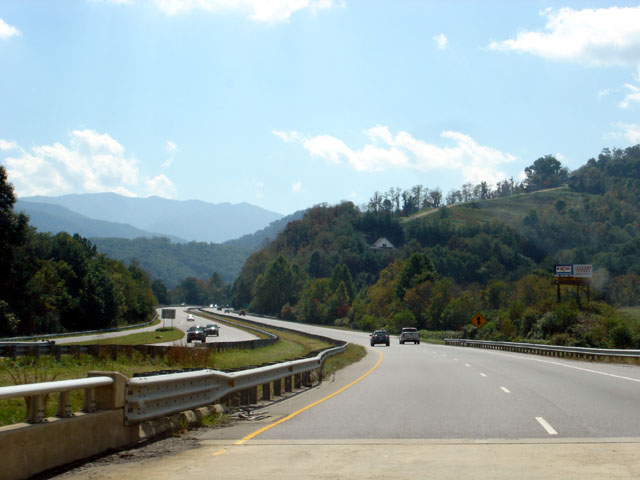
Great Smoky Mountains Expressway through Waynesville

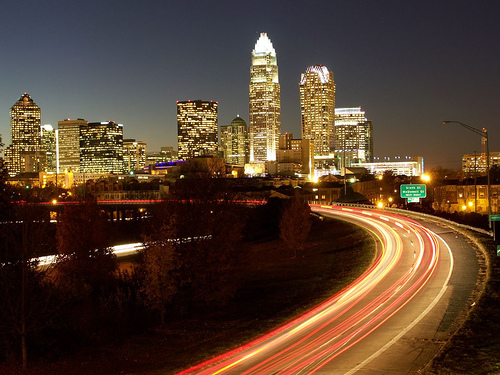
The Charlotte Skyline from Independence Freeway

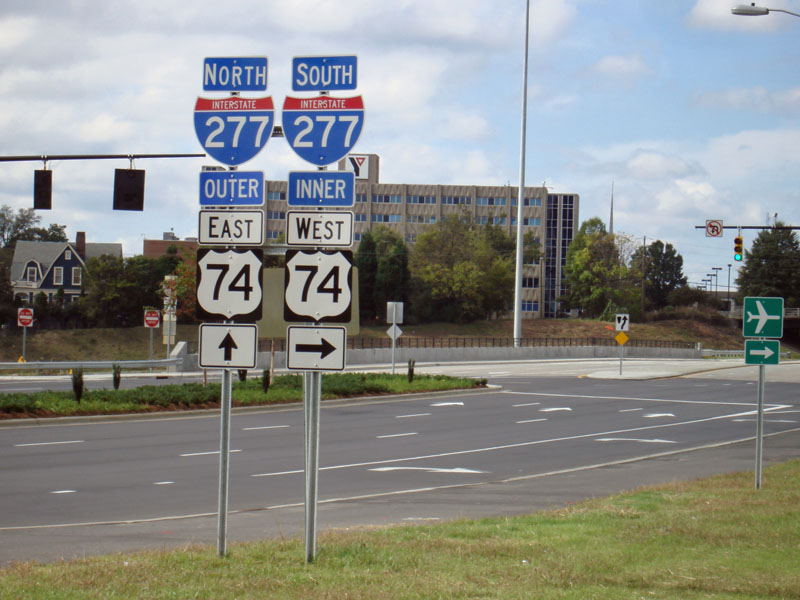
I-277/US 74 directional signs at Stonewall Street, in Charlotte

From the Tennessee state line, US 74 traverses across the southern portion of the state, connecting the major cities Asheville, Charlotte, and Wilmington, for a total of 451.8 miles (727.1 km).

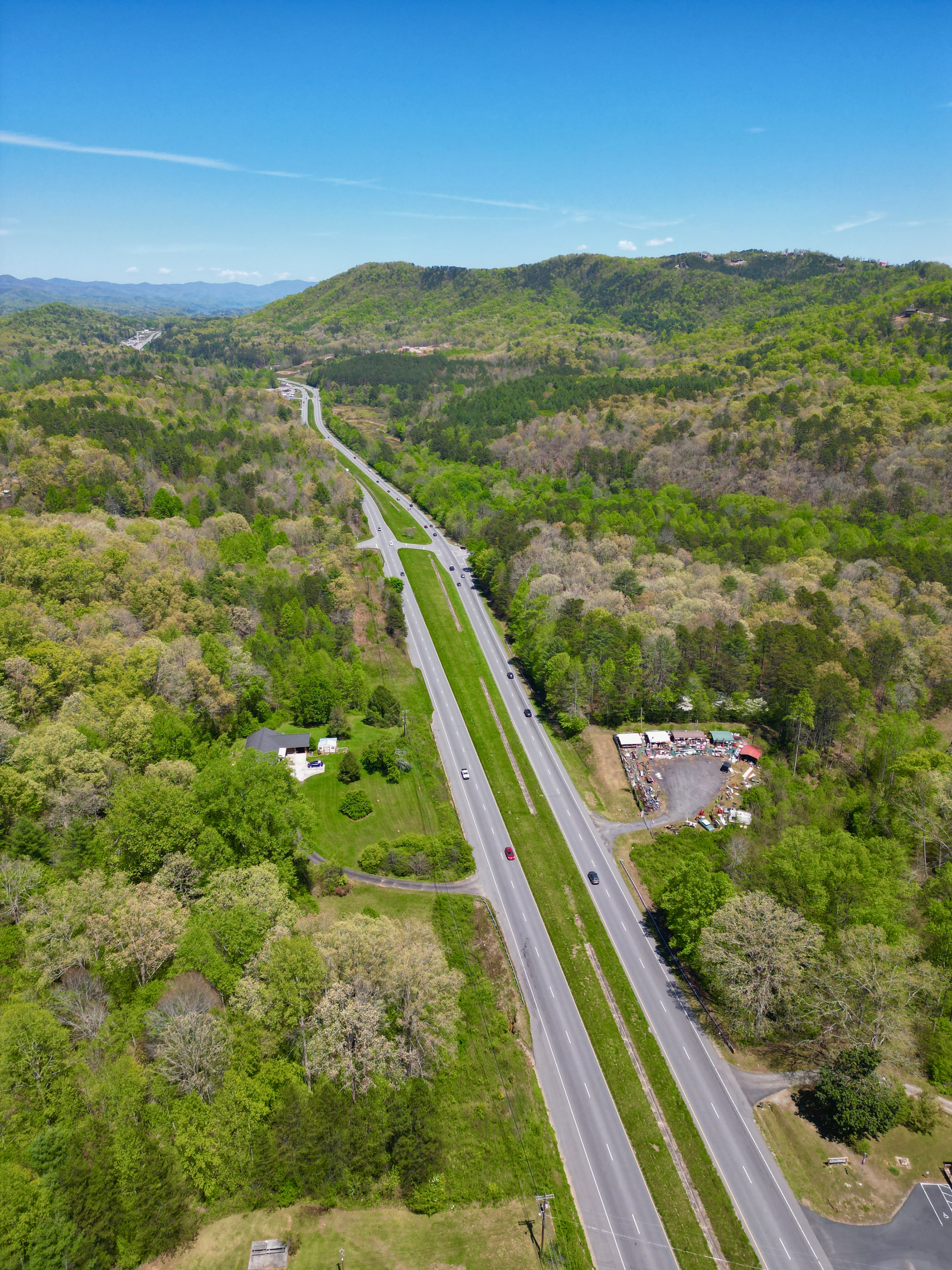
US 74 in western North Carolina just before it reaches Tennessee

In western North Carolina, US 74 enters the state with a concurrency with US 64. Routed along on pre-existing highways in the region, specifically the: Appalachian Highway (at-grade expressway, except in the Nantahala Gorge) and the Great Smoky Mountains Expressway (controlled-access freeway, which is broken in three sections along the route); it shares a revolving door of concurrency changes with US 19, US 129, US 441 and US 23. The alternating named highway (depending on grade of road) is considered the commercial back-bone and main truck route of Western North Carolina, connecting the cities of Murphy, Andrews, Bryson City, Cherokee, Sylva, and Waynesville. In or around October, the fall colors create an influx of more tourists in the region. In the winter months, the highway is the first to be salted and plowed; however, both the Nantahala Gorge and Balsam Gap tend to get the most snow and/or ice in the region and should be traveled with care.

North of Clyde, US 74 merges with Interstate 40 and goes east, in concurrency, to Asheville. From there, it then goes southeast, in concurrency with Interstate 26 till Columbus, where it separates and continues east along a mostly controlled-access highway, except in Shelby, to Interstate 85, in Kings Mountain.

After crossing a unique weave intersection with Interstate 85, it joins with US 29 and travels through downtown Gastonia along Franklin Boulevard. East of Gastonia, it becomes Wilkinson Boulevard as it goes through McAdenville, Cramerton and Belmont. After crossing the Lake Wylie/Catawba River, via Sloans Ferry Bridge, it enters Charlotte, with connections with Interstate 485 and Interstate 85/Charlotte Douglas International Airport, via Little Rock Road. At Morehead Street, west of Center City, it splits with US 29 for Interstate 277 along the John Belk Freeway. East of Center City, it goes solo again along Independence Freeway/Boulevard to Matthews, where it connects again with Interstate 485.

After leaving the Charlotte city limits, the route turns southeast as it goes through Stallings, Indian Trail and Monroe, where it briefly overlaps with US 601, before continuing east again through Wingate, Marshville, Peachland, Polkton, Wadesboro and Lilesville. On this stretch, prior to 2018, signage for the route was very poor, only being found at a few locations along the route. As part of the US 74 Monroe Bypass project, signage along the route was improved by the NCDOT.

Crossing the Pee Dee River and into the Sandhills region, US 74 meets up with Future Interstates I-73/I-74, in Rockingham. After a future interchange near NC 38 that will end its overlap with Interstate 73, US 74/Future I-74 continues southeast, bypassing Laurinburg and Maxton. East of Maxton and through Lumberton, the highway is officially US 74/Interstate 74, before dropping back to Future I-74 west of Boardman; the concurrency with Future I-74 ends at Bolton, where a future interchange will split from US 74 to continue south towards South Carolina. This is one of only two instances (along with I-41 in Wisconsin) of similarly numbered U.S. and Interstate routes being designated on the same road.

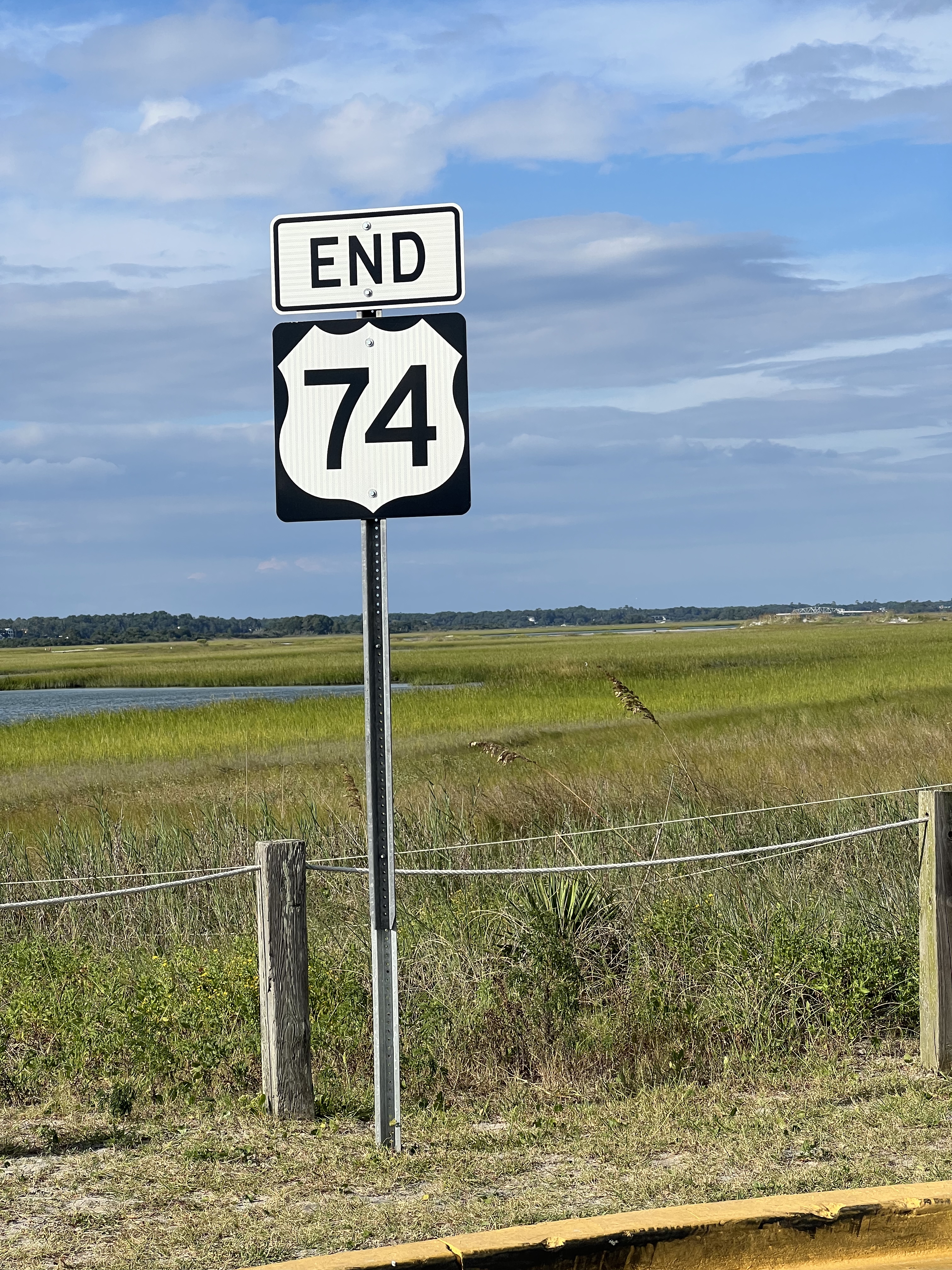
Sign at eastern end of US 74 in Wrightsville Beach, North Carolina

Near Chadbourn, US 74 overlaps with US 76, which continue mostly together till Wrightsville Beach, where US 74 dead-ends north and US 76 dead-ends south. Eastbound after the overlap with US 76, US 74 continues on Salisbury Street through some residential areas and businesses before coming to a traffic light separating Salisbury Street and Lumina Avenue. Drivers are directed to take a left on to North Lumina Avenue to continue on US 74 while South Lumina Avenue connects to Jack Parker Boulevard, which leads to US 76. Approximately 1.7 miles (2.7 km) on North Lumina, US 74 reaches its eastern terminus at a dead end circle with an entrance to the local Shell Island Resort hotel.

The highway connects the cities and towns of Whiteville, Lake Waccamaw, and Wilmington. The road through the Cape Fear region is flat, surrounded by parts of the Green Swamp.

=== ADHS corridors ===
US 74 overlaps with two corridors that are part of the Appalachian Development Highway System (ADHS), which is part of Appalachian Regional Commission (ARC). Passed in 1965, the purpose of ADHS is to generate economic development in previously isolated areas, supplement the interstate system, connect Appalachia to the interstate system, and provide access to areas within the Region as well as to markets in the rest of the nation.

- Corridor A – From I-285, in Sandy Springs, Georgia to I-40, near Clyde, North Carolina. US 74 overlap from US 23, in Dillsboro, to I-40, near Clyde; it is also completed with divided four-lane limited-access and controlled-access sections. This corridor is signed as "Appalachian Highway," in white text on blue background.
- Corridor K – From I-75, in Cleveland, Tennessee, to US 23, in Dillsboro, North Carolina. The entire 127.7-mile (205.5 km) section of US 74 is authorized for ADHS funding. The majority of the route is a four-lane limited-access road, with a section that is controlled-access between Bryson City and Cherokee. Current two-lane sections that are impending improvements are: Ocoee River to Ducktown and the Nantahala Gorge. In North Carolina, this corridor is signed as "Appalachian Highway," in white text on blue background.

=== Scenic byways ===
The Ocoee Scenic Byway is a 26-mile (42 km) National Forest Scenic Byway that traverses through the Cherokee National Forest, in East Tennessee. 19 miles of the Byway are concurrent with US 74 (in addition to U.S. Route 64). Features include the Ocoee Whitewater Center and scenic bluffs along Ocoee River and Gorge.

Nantahala Byway is a 43-mile (69 km) byway from Marble to Whittier; it is known for its scenic views of the Nantahala Gorge, The Great Smoky Mountains Railroad, and whitewater rafting on the Nantahala River. US 74 overlaps 38 miles (61 km) of the byway from Marble to Bryson City. The byway also overlaps with US 19 and US 129.

=== Dedicated and memorial names ===
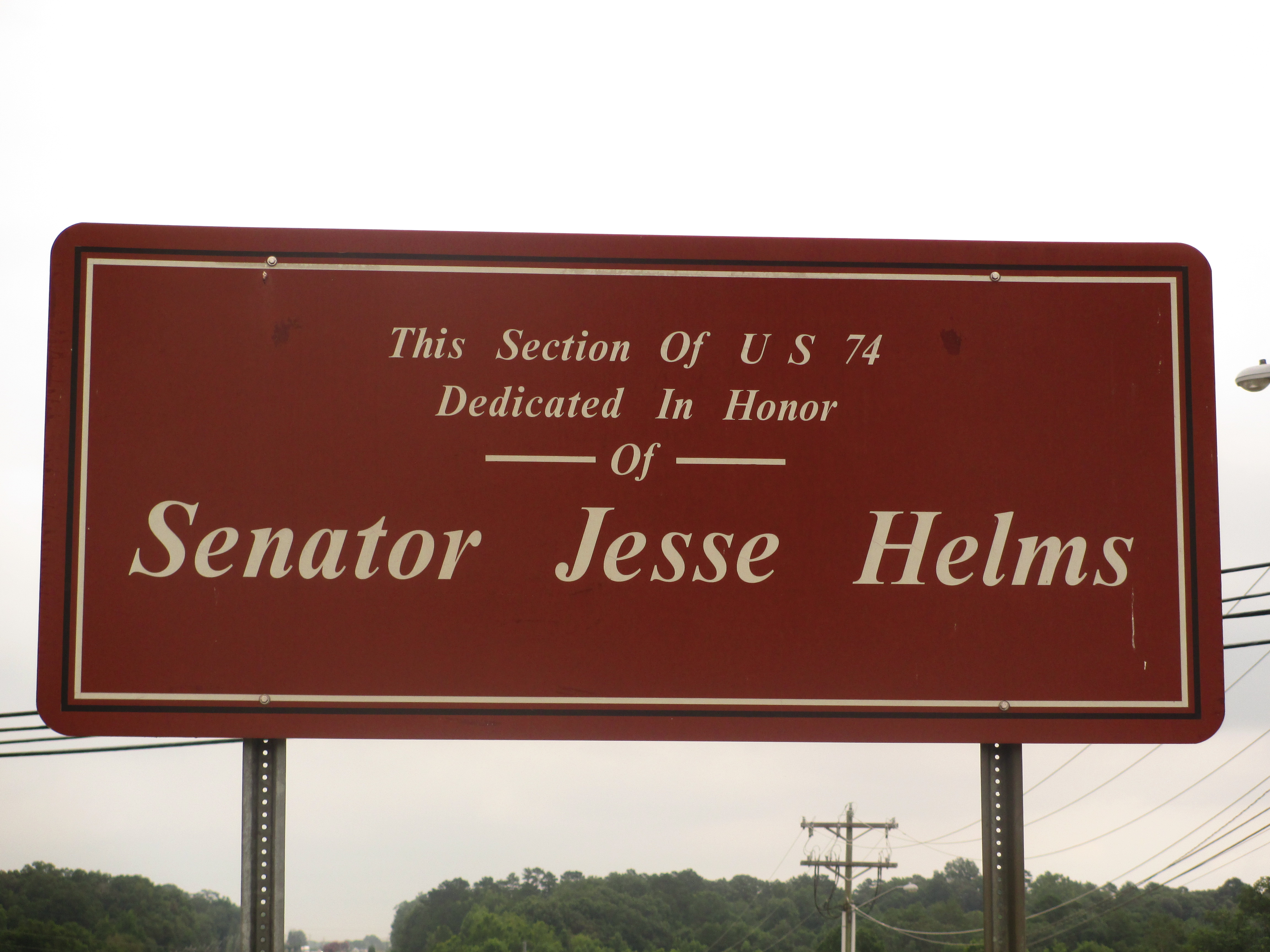
A section of US 74 in Monroe, named in honor of U.S. Senator Jesse Helms

US 74 features several dedicated bridges and stretches of highway throughout its route.

- American Indian Highway – this name was authored by Tuscarora Indian Robert M. Chavis, he launched a campaign to obtain support from all the city councils and the Robeson county Commissioners, they all signed onto the partition Mr. Chavis sent to the NCDOT and it was approved by the state DOT, official North Carolina name of the 19 miles (31 km) section of US 74/I-74 in Robeson County (mile marker 191–213). It is named to honor the large American Indian population in Robeson County (approved: November 8, 2001).
- Andrew Jackson Highway – Official North Carolina name of US 74 throughout the state, except in Robeson County (it is still named along the old sections of US 74 now called US 74 Business and Alternate). It was established to honor of the seventh President of the United States, Andrew Jackson (approved: April 4, 1963). Signage is found primarily east of Charlotte, overlapping other official North Carolina dedicated sections.
- C. Heide Trask Bridge – Official North Carolina name of bridge over the Inland Waterway, in Wrightsville Beach (approved: June 9, 1958).
- Cameron Morrison Bridge – Was an official North Carolina name of the first bridge and later westbound US 74 bridge, over the Pee Dee River. It was named in honor of Governor Morrison, who was a Richmond County native. The bridge, built in 1925, was dedicated to Morrison originally at an unknown date; in 1983, after the bridge was reconstructed to modern standards, it was rededicated to R.W. Goodman.
- Dean Arledge Memorial Highway – Official North Carolina name of US 74 between I-26 and NC 9, in Polk County (approved: March 3, 2000).
- G R Kindley Freeway – Official North Carolina name of US 74/I-74 along the Rockingham-Hamlet bypass. It is named in honor of the former mayor of Rockingham (approved: September 8, 2000).
- Herman H. West Bridge – Official North Carolina name of bridge over the Valley River, in Cherokee County. It was dedicated in honor of the former state Senator and Representative (approved: September 8, 2000).
- Hezekiah Pridgen Sr. Bridge – Official North Carolina name of bridge over US 701, in Columbus County (approved: August 4, 1995).
- James Archibald Hardison Bridge – Official North Carolina name of the eastbound US 74 bridge, over the Pee Dee River. It is named in honor of the former Highway Commissioner and member of the Highway Commission under three governors, from 1933 to 1937 and 1953-1961 (approved: December 30, 1958).
- J. Ollie Harris Highway – Official North Carolina name of US 74 Bypass at Kings Mountain (approved: October 3, 1997).
- James Arthur Callahan Freeway – Official North Carolina name of a 2.7-mile (4.3 km) section of US 74/I-26 in Rutherford County (approved: May 10, 1992).
- John Belk Freeway – Official North Carolina name of US 74/I-277, from I-77/US 21 to Independence Boulevard, in Uptown Charlotte. It is named in honor of John M. Belk, who was mayor of Charlotte from 1969 to 1977 (approved: September 11, 1981).
- Martin Luther King Jr. Parkway – Official City of Wilmington name of US 74 from the Northeast Cape Fear River east to US 17 Bus.; named in honor of the late civil rights leader. The section from 23rd Street to Market Street, which opened in the late 1990s, previously had the unofficial name "Smith Creek Parkway", named for the creek of the same name and thus indirectly named for William Smith, credited as being a founder of Wilmington.
- R.W. Goodman Bridge – Official North Carolina name of the westbound US 74 bridge, over the Pee Dee River. It is named in honor of the former Richmond County sheriff R. W. Goodman (approved: March 11, 1983).
- Senator Jesse Helms Freeway – Official North Carolina name of US 74 between US 601 to the Anson-Union County line (approved: January 8, 1993). Named in honor of the late five-term U.S. senator who was born in Union County in 1921.
- Solon David Smart Memorial Highway – Official North Carolina name of highway from NC 120 to US 221A, in Rutherford County (approved: December 1, 2000).
- W Cliff Martin Highway – Official North Carolina name of US 74 from Union County line to Wadesboro, in Anson County (approved: May 2, 1997).

== History ==
US 74 westbound and NC 200 southbound near Concord Avenue in Monroe

Established as an original U.S. Route in late 1926, US 74 traversed from Asheville to Chadbourn, in North Carolina. It was extended eastward in late 1934 to Wilmington, replacing an old alignment of US 17.

In 1936, US 74 was extended eastward again from Wilmington, via Market Street, to Wrightsville Beach, then going north on Lumina Avenue to its current eastern terminus. US 74 also spawned two alternate routes the same year, the first and shortest (0.14 miles (0.23 km)) in Leland, and a second in Shelby; which eventually replaced all of US 74 through the downtown area by 1949 (later renamed US 74 Business in 1960).

In 1937, US 74 was rerouted through Kings Mountain, replacing part of NC 7. Its old alignment became an alternate route, but was replaced a year later by both NC 161 and NC 274.

By 1949, US 74 was on its first bypass around Rutherfordton, via Ruth; its former route becoming an alternate route (later renamed US 74 Business in 1960). In 1952, the first Monroe Bypass was completed, leaving a short-lived alternate route going through the downtown area. By 1953, the first bypass around Rockingham was completed, leaving a short lived alternate route through the downtown area.

In 1970, US 74 was placed on new freeway alignment bypassing Spindale, Forest City, Ellenboro, and Mooresboro; the old route was replaced by an extension of US 74 Business. In 1973, US 74 was realigned onto new road south of Lumberton. In 1975, US 74/US 76 was rerouted onto new freeway bypass south of Leland and then east of Belville, its old alignment becoming secondary roads. In 1976, US 74/US 76 was bypassed north of Chadbourn and Whiteville, leaving behind US 74 Bus./US 76 Bus.

In 1984, Maxton was bypassed, replaced by an extension of US 74 Bus. In 1985, US 74 was rerouted north of Kings Mountain onto new freeway bypass; its old alignment becoming US 74 Bus. In 1986, Hallsboro and Lake Waccamaw were bypassed; its old alignment replaced by NC 214.

Also in 1986, US 74 was extended west, from Asheville to Chattanooga, Tennessee. The routing extension started at its former western terminus with US 70, going northerly, in concurrency with US 70, to I-240, where it overlapped briefly before joining US 19/US 23. From Asheville, in concurrency with US 19/US 23, it went through Canton and Lake Junaluska. From Lake Junaluska, in concurrency with US 23, it went through Waynesville. Near Dillsboro it switches US 23 for US 441 and continues till it splits north within the Qualla Boundary. West of Bryson City, it overlaps with NC 28. In Topton, it joins with US 129 and continues southwesterly till at Murphy, where it joins with US 64 and separates from US 19/US 129. Heading west, in concurrency with US 64, it enters Tennessee; traversing through Ducktown, it reaches Cleveland, where it then follows the US 64 Bypass to I-75. Continuing southeasterly, as a hidden concurrency with I-75, it connects with Chattanooga, ending at its new terminus at I-24.

In 1988, US 74 was extended 1.46 miles (2.35 km) east to its current eastern terminus in Wrightsville Beach. In 1990, US 74 was rerouted onto I-277 (John Belk Freeway), this left a section of Independence Boulevard that was still overlapped with NC 27. In 1992–1993, Bolton was bypassed to the north, with its old alignment becoming an extension of NC 214.

In 1994, US 74 was rerouted onto I-40 for 1.58 miles (2.54 km), in Asheville, and then onto I-26, from Asheville to Columbus. East of Columbus, it traverses along new freeway to Forest City, where it meets back with its old alignment. The former routing between Asheville and Forest City becomes US 74A. In 1996, US 74 was rerouted through Wilmington. In late 1997, US 74 was rerouted onto I-40, between Clyde and Asheville.

In 2002, US 74 was placed on its second bypass around both Rockingham and Hamlet, its old alignment becoming US 74 Business. In 2005, US 74 was rerouted north of downtown Wilmington. In 2007, US 74 was placed on new freeway, in concurrency with I-74 from Maxton to just east of I-95; its old alignment becoming US 74 Alternate.

In 2018, US 74's new toll bypass around Monroe was completed.

=== Independence Boulevard ===
Independence Boulevard and Independence Expressway are two major interconnected roads in Mecklenburg County, North Carolina that carry US 74. Originally constructed in the 1940s and early 1950s, Independence Boulevard was the city of Charlotte's first expressway. The road has undergone numerous realignments, extensions, upgrades, truncations, and renamings since the mid-20th century.

Ben Douglas, former mayor of Charlotte and member of the North Carolina State Highway Commission, helped lead the push for the urban highway project in the 1940s that would become Independence Boulevard. In 1946, Charlotte voters passed a referendum in favor of a $200,000 bond issue to fund the project; this was coupled with over $2 million in federal funding. The expressway was to be named after Independence Park that was largely demolished to make way for the road; the name suggestion was coined by City Clerk Lillian Hoffman on May 4, 1949, after a previous suggestion naming it after the current mayor, Herbert Baxter, was rejected. Construction commenced in the late 1940s and the new expressway which traversed east–west along the southern part of the city opened in two parts; the first opened to traffic in 1949 and the other opened in 1950. US 74 and NC 27 were subsequently shifted from their central business district alignments to the new expressway.

Major changes to Independence Boulevard occurred in the 1980s. A portion of West Independence Boulevard was converted from expressway to limited-access freeway and made a part of the John Belk Freeway and Interstate 277. The portion west of Interstate 77 was renamed Wilkinson Boulevard. A new intersection with I-277 (which would also connect to the Brookshire Freeway that was upgraded as part of the I-277 project) was constructed and the connecting freeway along with the updated portion of East Independence Boulevard was given the name Independence Freeway; US 74 was shifted to this new alignment. After the massive transportation revamp, a few disconnected segments of the original Independence Boulevard remained. These segments were later reorganized and given the names Carson Boulevard, Stonewall Street, and South Independence Boulevard; the latter was downgraded to a surface street and renamed Charlottetown Avenue in 2007 to prevent confusion with the unconnected East Independence Boulevard. In 2021, Stonewall Street was renamed to Brooklyn Village Avenue to honor a Charlotte neighborhood that had been demolished for expansion of the Uptown area.

The freeway and bus lanes of Independence Freeway were extended to Albemarle Road in 2005. The limited-access road extension has caused numerous businesses along the corridor to leave the area and vacate their commercial real estate, resulting in brownfield land.

=== "American Indian Highway" controversy ===
In Robeson County, the highway is designated "American Indian Highway," a name that was the brain child of Robert M. Chavis, the Wolfclan chief of the NC Tuscarora; Cherokee Indians of Robeson County, and Nottoway Nation, who authored the name in the late 1990s. American Indian people of Robeson County, NC had attempted to remove Andrew Jackson's name from the highway for some sixty years. Knowing that the new US 74 was to come, Chavis started a campaign to change the name to American Indian Highway. Chavis did this in honor of all the Indian people that had lost their lives along the Trail of Tears during the Indian Removal Act of the 1830s authored by Andrew Jackson. Chavis was cited in many newspapers across North Carolina stating that the name should be changed, because that name on this section of road was tantamount to having a major road named Adolf Hitler that ran across a Jewish state or county. Chavis, with the help of the Tuscarora East of the Mountains, obtained the information on how to attempt the name change from Rep. Ronnie Sutton and the NCDOT. Then Chavis presented the reasons for the name change to all the cities of Robeson County and the Robeson County Commissioners. Once he obtained support from these entities, he presented the proposal to the NCDOT. Rep. Sutton supported the name change at the state level and the name change was approved by the NCDOT. The new signs of American Indian Highway were placed on the new sections of I-74 once the highway construction was completed.

== Future ==
=== Western North Carolina ===
In Graham County, NCDOT has proposed to relocate US 74 onto a new divided four-lane highway from Robbinsville to Stecoah. This new routing will feature controlled at-grade intersections, viaduct and tunnel (at Stecoah Gap). At a cost of $383 million, right-of-way acquisition was scheduled to begin in 2014 and construction was scheduled to begin in 2016; however, this is subject to reprioritization. The project is part of an overall project to bypass the current routing through the Nantahala Gorge, where bottlenecks are common along the two-lane highway through protected valley area within the Nantahala National Forest. The overall project, from Andrews to Almond, would complete a four-lane expressway from Cherokee County to Asheville.

The portion of US 74 that is concurrent with I-40 near Asheville and I-26 south of Asheville is being improved as part of the Asheville I-26 Connector project and the widening project of I-26 between Hendersonville and Asheville.

=== Future Interstate corridor (Columbus to Kings Mountain, North Carolina) ===
On April 10, 2023, United States House Representative Chuck Edwards (NC-11) introduced a bill (H.R.2552) to the House Committee on Transportation and Infrastructure, co-sponsored by Representative Patrick McHenry (NC-10). The bill would have designated the entire stretch of US 74 from I-26 in Columbus, to I-85 in Kings Mountain as a future Interstate Highway by amending the Intermodal Surface Transportation Efficiency Act of 1991 (ISTEA) to include it as a High Priority Corridor. The bill eventually stalled in committee, leading to Representative Tim Moore (NC-14) introducing a new bill (H.R.1333) to the committee on February 13, 2025. However, in May 2026, the bill was folded into the BUILD America 250 Act (H.R.8870), which would go on to be approved by the committee 62-2 in a vote held on May 22, 2026.

Most of the corridor is already a freeway with the exception of sections in Mooresboro and Shelby in Cleveland County. Currently, an 18.5-mile (29.8 km) controlled-access highway is being constructed under the designation of US 74 Bypass to bypass Shelby to the north. When completed, it will improve vehicle capacity along the US 74 corridor, reduce future traffic congestion, increase safety and improve roadway continuity between I-26 and I-85. Being built in six sections, the cost is estimated at $295.9 million and has been fully funded. Construction first began on Section AA in July 2013 and was completed in September 2016. The next two sections (AB and B) started in July 2014 and were both completed in April 2018. An additional paving project for Section AB (listed as Section F) was completed in 2020 as well. Construction on Section C began in 2017 and was completed by June 2024. The final design as well as right-of-way purchase for sections D and E are underway and construction of these final sections began by the end of 2023 and will be completed by 2029.

In Mooresboro, there are plans to convert the last remaining at-grade intersections (US 74 Business/Lattimore Road/Academy Street) into an interchange, as well as improving the bridges over Sandy Run Creek. When the interchange and the rest of the Shelby Bypass are completed, US 74 will become a full freeway between I-26 in Asheville and I-85 in Kings Mountain. The project had been in the State Transportation Improvement Program since 2000, but activities on it were limited until funding was secured in 2018. Public input from the community on these improvements, which gave four alternatives construction plans (1, 1A, 2, and 2A) as well as three options for service roads, was requested from late August to early September 2022. In December 2022, NCDOT announced the findings from the responses given and later stated that they had chosen Alternative 1A. This alternative will transform the US 74 Business/Lattimore Road/Academy Street intersection with a parclo interchange that will include a roundabout on the ramps to and from eastbound lanes. Service road plans were not announced, but public feedback showed almost unanimous support for option 3. Right-of-way acquisition and construction both began in 2023.

=== Charlotte and Wadesboro ===
The Independence Widening project, in Mecklenburg County, is to enhance and improve traffic flow and safety along US 74 in east Charlotte, by converting the corridor into an expressway grade highway from Center City to Matthews. Construction on three new interchanges at Sharon-Amity Road, Idlewild Road and Conference Drive were completed by October 15, 2016, at a cost of $101.2 million. NCDOT is now planning to add two-way grade-separated express lanes to this segment along with converting it to an expressway with additional interchanges as well. Partial funding for part of the project was provided in the NCDOT's 2024-2033 State Transportation Improvement Program and right-of-way acquisition started in 2024; construction will begin in 2028.

In Union and Anson counties, the US 74 freeway upgrade and Wadesboro Bypass is an estimated $741 million project. Plans include linking with the Monroe Expressway and the Rockingham Bypass with upgrading to existing facilities to freeway standards and bypass the cities of both Marshville (to the south) and Wadesboro (to the north). The Wadesboro Bypass project remains only partially funded, but it was included in the NCDOT's 2024-2033 State Transportation Improvement Program. Feedback from Anson County residents was requested from late-November–December 2023. Currently, the right of way for the project is tentatively scheduled for summer of 2028, with construction on the bypass beginning summer of 2030.

=== Interstate 74 upgrades (Rockingham to Bolton, North Carolina) ===
The US 74 corridor from Rockingham to Bolton is being upgraded to interstate standards as part of the I-74 extension. Currently, the only segment that has been completed and been officially signed as I-74 is between Maxton and Lumberton. This segment has an interchange with I-95, which meant that it could be signed as an interstate since it connected to the interstate highway system. The other portions of the route are in various stages of planning.

== Junction list ==
| State | County | Location | mi | km | Exit | Destinations | Notes |
|---|---|---|---|---|---|---|---|
| Tennessee | Hamilton | Chattanooga | 0.0 | 0.0 | 2 | I-24 west / I-75 south to I-59 – Atlanta, Chattanooga, Birmingham | Western terminus of US 74; west end of I-75 overlap; exit numbers follow I-75; US 74 begins unsigned |
| Tennessee | Hamilton | Chattanooga | 2.2 | 3.5 | 3 | SR 320 (East Brainerd Road) | Signed as exits 3A (east) and 3B (west) westbound |
| Tennessee | Hamilton | Chattanooga | 2.9 | 4.7 | 4 | SR 153 north – Chattanooga Airport, Chickamauga Dam | |
| Tennessee | Hamilton | Chattanooga | 3.0 | 4.8 | 4A | Hamilton Place Boulevard | westbound exit and eastbound entrance |
| Tennessee | Hamilton | Chattanooga | 4.4 | 7.1 | 5 | Shallowford Road | |
| Tennessee | Hamilton | Chattanooga | 6.2 | 10.0 | 7 | US 11 south / US 64 west (SR 2 west) / SR 317 west (Bonny Oaks Drive) / Old Lee Highway – Summit, Collegedale | West end of US 11/US 64/SR 2/SR 317 overlap; signed as exits 7A (Old Lee Hwy.) and 7B (SR 317) northbound |
| Tennessee | Hamilton | Chattanooga | 7.8 | 12.6 | 9 | SR 317 east (Apison Pike) / Volkswagen Drive – Collegedale | East end of SR 317 overlap; serves Volkswagen Chattanooga Assembly Plant |
| Tennessee | Hamilton | Chattanooga | 10.3 | 16.6 | 11 | US 11 north / US 64 east (SR 2 east) – Ooltewah | East end of US 11/US 64/SR 2 overlap |
| Tennessee | Bradley | Cleveland | 19.2 | 30.9 | 20 | I-75 north / US 64 Byp. begins (SR 311 begins) – Knoxville | East end of I-75 and west end of US 64 Byp./SR 311 overlap |
| Tennessee | Bradley | Cleveland | 19.8 | 31.9 | | Cherokee Gateway | Interchange |
| Tennessee | Bradley | Cleveland | 20.7 | 33.3 | | US 11 / US 64 (N Lee Highway/ SR 2) – Cleveland | Interchange |
| Tennessee | Bradley | Cleveland | 22.9 | 36.9 | | Blue Springs Road – Red Clay State Historic Area | Interchange |
| Tennessee | Bradley | Cleveland | 24.2 | 38.9 | | SR 60 (Dalton Pike) – Dalton Ga. | Interchange via access road (McGrady Drive) |
| Tennessee | Bradley | East Cleveland | 24.6 | 39.6 | | SR 74 (Spring Place Road) | Interchange |
| Tennessee | Bradley | East Cleveland | 25.8 | 41.5 | | US 64 Byp. ends (SR 311 ends) / US 64 west / SR 60 (APD-40/Waterlevel Highway/ SR 40 west) – Cleveland, Dayton | Cloverleaf interchange; east end of US 64 Byp./SR 311 overlap; west end of US 64/SR 40 overlap; US 74 becomes signed |
| Tennessee | Polk | Ocoee | 33.3 | 53.6 | | US 411 (SR 33) – Benton, Chatsworth, GA | Interchange |
| Tennessee | Polk | Parksville | 37.7 | 60.7 | | SR 314 north (Parksville Road) – Benton | Southern terminus of SR 314 |
| Tennessee | Polk | | 42.9 | 69.0 | | SR 30 west – Reliance | Eastern terminus of SR 30 |
| Tennessee | Polk | Ducktown | 59.2 | 95.3 | | SR 68 – Copperhill, Ducktown | Interchange |
| | | | 63.0 0.0 | 101.4 0.0 | Tennessee–North Carolina line | | |
| North Carolina | Cherokee | | 12.2 | 19.6 | | NC 294 west – Hiwassee | To Hiwassee Dam |
| North Carolina | Cherokee | | 14.0 | 22.5 | | NC 60 south – Blue Ridge | |
| North Carolina | Cherokee | | 14.7 | 23.7 | | US 19 south / US 129 south (Blairsville Highway) – Blairsville | West end of US 19/US 129 overlap |
| North Carolina | Cherokee | Murphy | 19.9 | 32.0 | | US 19 Bus. north (Hiwassee Street) | |
| North Carolina | Cherokee | Murphy | 20.3 | 32.7 | | US 64 east – Hayesville, Franklin | East end of US 64 overlap |
| North Carolina | Cherokee | | 23.1 | 37.2 | | US 19 Bus. south (Andrews Road) | |
| North Carolina | Cherokee | Marble | 29.1 | 46.8 | | NC 141 south – Hayesville | To Tri-County Community College |
| North Carolina | Cherokee | Andrews | 34.4 | 55.4 | | US 19 Bus. north (Main Street) / Airport Road – Western Carolina Regional Airport | |
| North Carolina | Cherokee | Andrews | 37.4 | 60.2 | | US 19 Bus. south (Main Street) | |
| North Carolina | Cherokee | Topton | 44.4 | 71.5 | | US 129 north (Tallulah Road) – Robbinsville, Fontana, Knoxville | East end of US 129 overlap |
| North Carolina | Macon | No major junctions | | | | | |
| North Carolina | Swain | Almond | 58.6 | 94.3 | | NC 28 north (Mtn. Waters Scenic Byway) – Robbinsville, Fontana | West end of NC 28 overlap; to Fontana Dam |
| North Carolina | Swain | Lauada | 61.7 | 99.3 | | NC 28 south – Franklin | East end of NC 28 overlap |
| North Carolina | Swain | | 64.0 | 103.0 | 64 | US 19 north (Alarka Road) – Bryson City, Cherokee | East end of US 19 overlap; west end of Great Smoky Mountains Expressway |
| North Carolina | Swain | Bryson City | 66.9 | 107.7 | 67 | US 19 Conn. (Veterans Boulevard) – Bryson City, Great Smoky Mts National Park | |
| North Carolina | Swain | | 69.5 | 111.8 | 69 | Hyatt Creek Road – Ela | |
| North Carolina | Jackson | Whittier | 71.9 | 115.7 | 72 | Whittier | |
| North Carolina | Jackson | | 73.6 | 118.4 | 74 | US 441 north – Great Smoky Mts National Park, Cherokee | West end of US 441 overlap; to Blue Ridge Parkway |
| North Carolina | Jackson | Dillsboro | 81.1 | 130.5 | 81A | US 23 / US 441 south – Dillsboro, Franklin, Atlanta | East end of US 441 overlap; West end of US 23; signed as exit 81 westbound |
| North Carolina | Jackson | Dillsboro | 81.1 | 130.5 | 81B | Rufus Robinson Road | No signage for exit; westbound access via exit 81 (see above) |
| North Carolina | Jackson | Sylva | 83.2 | 133.9 | 83 | Grindstaff Cove Road – Sylva | |
| North Carolina | Jackson | Sylva | 85.2 | 137.1 | 85 | US 23 Bus. to NC 107 – East Sylva, Cullowhee | To Western Carolina University |
| North Carolina | Haywood | Balsam | 94.1 | 151.4 | | Blue Ridge Parkway | At-grade intersection; access via connector road |
| North Carolina | Haywood | Waynesville | 98.4 | 158.4 | 98 | US 23 Bus. (Balsam Road) – West Waynesville | |
| North Carolina | Haywood | Waynesville | 99.5 | 160.1 | 100 | Hazelwood Avenue | |
| North Carolina | Haywood | Waynesville | 101.7 | 163.7 | 102 | US 276 – Waynesville, Brevard, Maggie Valley | Signed eastbound as exits 102A (south) and 102B (north) |
| North Carolina | Haywood | Lake Junaluska | 103.3 | 166.2 | 103 | US 19 south – Maggie Valley, Cherokee | West end of US 19 overlap; eastbound entrance and westbound exit |
| North Carolina | Haywood | Lake Junaluska | 104.0 | 167.4 | 104 | US 23 Bus. / NC 209 – Lake Junaluska, Waynesville, Hot Springs | |
| North Carolina | Haywood | | 105.2 | 169.3 | 105 | West Jones Cove | |
| North Carolina | Haywood | Clyde | 106.0 | 170.6 | 106 | US 19 north / US 23 north – Clyde, Canton | East end of US 19/US 23 overlap |
| North Carolina | Haywood | Clyde | 106.1 | 170.8 | 107 | East Jones Cove | Westbound exit and entrance only; integrated with exit 106 |
| North Carolina | Haywood | Clyde | 107.0 | 172.2 | | I-40 west – Knoxville | West end of I-40 overlap; I-40 exit 27; east end of Great Smoky Mountains Expressway |
| North Carolina | US 74 overlaps with Interstate 40 (exits 27 to 46A) and Interstate 26 (exits 31B to 67) | | | | | | |
| North Carolina | Polk | Columbus | 161 | 259 | 161 | I-26 east to NC 108 – Tryon, Spartanburg | East end of I-26 overlap; I-26 exit 67 |
| North Carolina | Polk | Columbus | 163 | 262 | 163 | NC 108 – Columbus, Mill Spring | |
| North Carolina | Polk | | 167 | 269 | 167 | NC 9 – Mill Spring, Lake Lure, Chimney Rock, New Prospect | |
| North Carolina | Polk | | 170 | 270 | 170 | Pea Ridge Road | To Tryon International Equestrian Center |
| North Carolina | Rutherford | | 173 | 278 | 173 | Union Road | |
| North Carolina | Rutherford | | 178 | 286 | 178 | US 221 / US 74 Bus. – Rutherfordton, Spartanburg | |
| North Carolina | Rutherford | Forest City | 181 | 291 | 181 | US 74A to US 64 – Spindale | |
| North Carolina | Rutherford | Forest City | 182 | 293 | 182 | US 221 Alt. – Forest City | |
| North Carolina | Rutherford | | 184 | 296 | 184 | Old Caroleen Road | |
| North Carolina | Rutherford | | 187 | 301 | 187 | Henrietta, Caroleen, Ellenboro | |
| North Carolina | Rutherford | | 189 | 304 | 189 | NC 120 | |
| North Carolina | Cleveland | Mooresboro | 191 | 307 | | US 74 Bus. west – Mooresboro | To be reconstructed as an interchange (future exit 192) |
| North Carolina | Cleveland | | 193 | 311 | 193 | Lattimore, Boiling Springs | |
| North Carolina | Cleveland | | 194 | 312 | 194 | To NC 226 north (Shelby Bypass) | Interchange paved in 2018; Future US 74 Byp.; future east end of freeway section |
| North Carolina | Cleveland | Shelby | 198 | 319 | | NC 226 north (Polkville Road) – Polkville, Marion | West end of NC 226 overlap |
| North Carolina | Cleveland | Shelby | 199 | 320 | | US 74 Bus. east (Marion Street) | |
| North Carolina | Cleveland | Shelby | 201 | 323 | | NC 18 (NC 150) – Gaffney | Interchange; access via connector road (Pine Street); signage only shows "To NC 18," ignoring NC 150 overlap |
| North Carolina | Cleveland | Shelby | 201.5 | 324.3 | | NC 226 south (Earl Road) – Grover | East end of NC 226 overlap |
| North Carolina | Cleveland | Shelby | 203 | 327 | | NC 180 (Post Road) – Gaffney | |
| North Carolina | Cleveland | Shelby | 204 | 328 | | US 74 Bus. west (Marion Street) | |
| North Carolina | Cleveland | | | | | US 74 Byp. west – Asheville | Future interchange |
| North Carolina | Cleveland | | 209 | 336 | 209 | David Baptist Church Road, Bethlehem Road | Future roundabout interchange |
| North Carolina | Cleveland | Kings Mountain | 211 | 340 | 211 | US 74 Bus. east (Shelby Road) – Moss Lake, Waco | West end of freeway section |
| North Carolina | Cleveland | Kings Mountain | 212 | 341 | | Oak Grove Road | |
| North Carolina | Cleveland | Kings Mountain | 213 | 343 | | NC 216 (Piedmont Avenue) – Kings Mountain, Cherryville | |
| North Carolina | Cleveland | Kings Mountain | 214 | 344 | | NC 161 (Cleveland Avenue) – Bessemer City | |
| North Carolina | Gaston | Kings Mountain | 215 | 346 | | US 74 Bus. west (King Street) – Kings Mountain | Westbound entrance and eastbound exit |
| North Carolina | Gaston | Kings Mountain | 215.1– 216 | 346.2– 348 | | US 29 south / I-85 – Charlotte, Spartanburg | West end of US 29 overlap; east end of freeway section |
| North Carolina | Gaston | Gastonia | 220 | 350 | | NC 274 north (Bessemer City Road) – Bessemer City | West end of NC 274 overlap |
| North Carolina | Gaston | Gastonia | 222 | 357 | | US 321 south (Chester Street) | One-way street |
| North Carolina | Gaston | Gastonia | 222 | 357 | | US 321 north (York Street) | One-way street |
| North Carolina | Gaston | Gastonia | 223 | 359 | | NC 274 south (Broad Street) | East end of NC 274 overlap; train tracks in median of road |
| North Carolina | Gaston | Gastonia | 224 | 360 | | NC 279 (New Hope Road) | |
| North Carolina | Gaston | Gastonia | 224.5 | 361.3 | | Aberdeen Boulevard | To Cox Road/Shopping Mall |
| North Carolina | Gaston | Belmont | 231 | 372 | | NC 7 (Main Street) | To Belmont Abbey College |
| North Carolina | Gaston | Belmont | 231.5 | 372.6 | | NC 273 (Park Street) – Mount Holly | |
| North Carolina | Gaston | Belmont | 232 | 373 | | NC 7 west (Catawba Street) | |
| North Carolina | Mecklenburg | Charlotte | 235 | 378 | | I-485 – Pineville, Huntersville | |
| North Carolina | Mecklenburg | Charlotte | 236 | 380 | | Little Rock Road – CLT Airport | |
| North Carolina | Mecklenburg | Charlotte | 237 | 381 | | Boyer Street to Billy Graham Parkway (Charlotte Route 4) – CLT Airport | |
| North Carolina | Mecklenburg | Charlotte | 239.5 | 385.4 | | US 29 north (Morehead Street) | East end of US 29 overlap |
| North Carolina | Mecklenburg | Charlotte | 240 | 390 | | I-77 / US 21 / I-277 begins – Statesville, Columbia | South end of I-277 overlap; west end of freeway section |
| North Carolina | Mecklenburg | Charlotte | US 74 overlaps with Interstate 277 (exits 1A to 2B) | | | | |
| North Carolina | Mecklenburg | Charlotte | 242 | 389 | 242 | I-277 / NC 16 north (Brookshire Freeway) | East end of I-277/NC 16 overlap |
| North Carolina | Mecklenburg | Charlotte | 243 | 391 | 243 | Charlottetowne Avenue | |
| North Carolina | Mecklenburg | Charlotte | 244 | 393 | 244 | Briar Creek Road – Bojangles' Coliseum | East end of freeway section |
| North Carolina | Mecklenburg | Charlotte | 245 | 394 | 245 | Wendover Road / Eastway Drive (Charlotte Route 4) | Interchange; signed as exits 245A (Wendover) and 245B (Eastway) |
| North Carolina | Mecklenburg | Charlotte | 246 | 396 | 246 | NC 27 east (Albemarle Road) | Interchange; east end of NC 27 overlap; eastbound left exit and westbound entrance |
| North Carolina | Mecklenburg | Charlotte | 246 | 396 | | To US 74 west / Pierson Drive | Interchange; eastbound exit and entrance only |
| North Carolina | Mecklenburg | Charlotte | | | 247 | To NC 27 east / Sharon Amity Road | Interchange |
| North Carolina | Mecklenburg | Charlotte | | | 248 | Idlewild Road | Interchange |
| North Carolina | Mecklenburg | Matthews | 252 | 406 | | NC 51 (Matthews Township Parkway) – Matthews, Mint Hill | Interchange |
| North Carolina | Mecklenburg | Matthews | 254 | 409 | 253 | I-485 – Pineville, Huntersville | Interchange; Signed as Exits 253A (south) and 253B (north) eastbound; I-485 exits 51A-B |
| North Carolina | Union | Stallings | | | 254 | McKee Road / Stallings Road / Marie Garris Drive | |
| North Carolina | Union | Stallings | | | 255 | US 74 Byp. east (Monroe Expressway) – Rockingham, Wilmington | Toll road; eastbound left exit and westbound entrance |
| North Carolina | Union | Monroe | 264.5 | 425.7 | | NC 200 (Dickerson Boulevard) | West end of NC 200 overlap |
| North Carolina | Union | Monroe | 265 | 426 | | Concord Avenue | Interchange |
| North Carolina | Union | Monroe | 265.5 | 427.3 | | US 601 north / NC 207 south (Skyway Drive) – Fairview, Concord | Interchange; West end of US 601 overlap; Northern terminus of NC 207 |
| North Carolina | Union | Monroe | 266 | 428 | | NC 200 north – Unionville | East end of NC 200 overlap |
| North Carolina | Union | Monroe | 268 | 431 | | US 601 south – Pageland | East end of US 601 overlap |
| North Carolina | Union | | | | 273 | US 74 Byp. west (Monroe Expressway) – Charlotte | Toll road; westbound left exit and eastbound entrance |
| North Carolina | Union | Marshville | 276 | 444 | | NC 205 (Elm Street) – New Salem | |
| North Carolina | Anson | Polkton | 285 | 459 | | NC 218 west (Williams Street) – New Salem, Mint Hill | |
| North Carolina | Anson | Wadesboro | 285 | 459 | | US 52 north / NC 742 north – Albemarle, Anson County Airport | West end of US 52/NC 742 overlap |
| North Carolina | Anson | Wadesboro | 293 | 472 | | NC 109 (Greene Street) / NC 742 south – Mount Gilead | East end of NC 742 overlap |
| North Carolina | Anson | Wadesboro | 295 | 475 | | US 52 south – Cheraw | East end of US 52 overlap |
| North Carolina | Anson | | 304 | 489 | | NC 145 south – Morven, Chesterfield | |
| North Carolina | Richmond | Rockingham | 306 | 492 | 306 | I-73 north / I-74 west / US 74 Bus. east – Asheboro, Rockingham | Temporary southern terminus of I-73; western end of I-74 overlap; future west end of I-73/I-74 overlap |
| North Carolina | Richmond | Rockingham | 308 | 496 | 308 | Cordova | |
| North Carolina | Richmond | Rockingham | 311 | 501 | 311 | US 1 to US 220 – Rockingham, Southern Pines, Cheraw | Was a par-clo before being upgraded to a diamond interchange with roundabouts. |
| North Carolina | Richmond | Hamlet | 316 | 509 | 316 | NC 177 – Hamlet | |
| North Carolina | Richmond | Hamlet | 319 | 513 | 319 | NC 38 east – Bennettsville | |
| North Carolina | Richmond | Hamlet | 320 | 510 | 320 | NC 381 – Hamlet, Gibson | |
| North Carolina | Richmond | Hamlet | 321 | 517 | 321 | US 74 Bus. – Hamlet | Westbound exit and eastbound entrance; temporary eastern terminus of I-74 |
| North Carolina | Scotland | Laurel Hill | 329 | 529 | | NC 144 east (Morgan Street) | |
| North Carolina | US 74 overlaps with Interstate 74 (exit 181 to Broadridge Road) | | | | | | |
| North Carolina | Robeson | Orrum | 373 | 600 | | NC 72 west (Wilmington Highway) – Lumberton, Red Springs | Eastern terminus of NC 72 |
| North Carolina | Robeson | Orrum | | | | NC 130 west / NC 72 west (Wilmington Highway) – Fairmont, Lumberton, Red Springs | Future interchange; future west end of NC 130 overlap; future eastern terminus of NC 72 |
| North Carolina | Robeson | Orrum | 374 | 602 | | NC 130 west – Fairmont | West end of NC 130 overlap |
| North Carolina | Robeson | Boardman | | | 225 | Macedonia Church Road / Old Boardman Road | Interchange opened in September 2023 |
| North Carolina | Columbus | Evergreen | 380 | 610 | 228 | NC 242 (Haynes Lennon Highway) – Bladenboro | West end of freeway section; exit numbers follow Future I-74 |
| North Carolina | Columbus | Chadbourn | 385 | 620 | 233 | US 74 Bus. east / NC 130 east / NC 410 – Chadbourn, Bladenboro | East end of NC 130 overlap |
| North Carolina | Columbus | Chadbourn | 387 | 623 | 235 | US 76 west – Chadbourn, Fair Bluff | West end of US 76 overlap; westbound exit and eastbouond entrance |
| North Carolina | Columbus | | 390 | 630 | 238 | Union Valley Road – Southeast Regional Industrial Park | |
| North Carolina | Columbus | Whiteville | 392 | 631 | 241 | US 701 – Whiteville, Clarkton | |
| North Carolina | Columbus | Whiteville | 395 | 636 | 244 | US 74 Bus. / US 76 Bus. west – Whiteville | Also to NC 214 |
| North Carolina | Columbus | Hallsboro | 400 | 640 | 248 | Hallsboro Road (SR 1001) | Opened to traffic June 12, 2020 |
| North Carolina | Columbus | Lake Waccamaw | 404 | 650 | 252 | Chauncey Town Road (SR 1735) | Roundabout interchange opened in October 2024; exit number follows Future I-74 |
| North Carolina | Columbus | Bolton | 410 | 660 | 258 | NC 211 – Clarkton, Bolton, Supply | Interchange; exit number follows Future I-74 |
| North Carolina | Columbus | Bolton | | | | I-74 east – Myrtle Beach | Proposed interchange (unconfirmed); future east end of I-74 overlap |
| North Carolina | Columbus | Bolton | 413 | 665 | | NC 214 west (Sam Potts Highway) – Bolton | Eastern terminus of NC 214 |
| North Carolina | Columbus | Freeman | 417 | 671 | | NC 11 north – Burgaw | Southern terminus of NC 11 |
| North Carolina | Columbus | Delco | 422 | 679 | | NC 87 north (Old Stage Road) – Riegelwood, Elizabethtown | West end of NC 87 overlap; formerly marked as Exit 270 |
| North Carolina | Brunswick | Maco | 426 | 686 | | NC 87 south – Southport, Northwest | East end of NC 87 overlap |
| North Carolina | Brunswick | Leland | 429.7 | 691.5 | | I-140 – Shallotte, Myrtle Beach, Topsail Island, Jacksonville | Interchange |
| North Carolina | Brunswick | Leland | 431 | 694 | | Lanvale Road – Leland | |
| North Carolina | Brunswick | Leland | 435 | 700 | | US 17 south – Shallotte, Myrtle Beach | West end of US 17 overlap |
| North Carolina | Brunswick | Leland | 436 | 702 | | NC 133 south – Leland, Belville, Southport, Oak Island | West end of NC 133 overlap |
| North Carolina | Brunswick | | 438 | 705 | | US 17 north / US 76 east / US 421 south – Wilmington, Carolina Beach | East end of US 17, east end of US 76 and west end of US 421 overlap |
| North Carolina | New Hanover | Wilmington | 439 | 707 | S. Thomas Rhodes Bridge over the Cape Fear River | | |
| North Carolina | New Hanover | Wilmington | 439.2 | 706.8 | | US 421 north to I-140 – Jacksonville, Clinton | East end of US 421 overlap |
| North Carolina | New Hanover | Wilmington | 440 | 710 | Isabel Stellings Holmes Bridge over the Northeast Cape Fear River | | |
| North Carolina | New Hanover | Wilmington | 440.6 | 709.1 | | 3rd Street – Downtown Wilmington | Interchange |
| North Carolina | New Hanover | Wilmington | 441 | 710 | | McRae Street | Interchange; eastbound exit and westbound entrance |
| North Carolina | New Hanover | Wilmington | 441.5 | 710.5 | | NC 133 north – Castle Hayne | East end of NC 133 overlap; trumpet interchange |
| North Carolina | New Hanover | Wilmington | 442 | 711 | | 23rd Street/Airport Boulevard – Wilmington International Airport | Partial cloverleaf interchange (B2) |
| North Carolina | New Hanover | Wilmington | 445 | 716 | | US 117 / NC 132 to I-40 / US 421 – Castle Hayne, Raleigh, State Port, Carolina Beach | |
| North Carolina | New Hanover | Wilmington | 446 | 718 | | US 17 Bus. (Market Street) – Wilmington, Ogden | |
| North Carolina | New Hanover | Wilmington | 448 | 721 | | US 17 / US 76 west (Military Cutoff Road) – Wilmington, Jacksonville | West end of US 76 overlap |
| North Carolina | New Hanover | Wrightsville Beach | 449 | 723 | | US 76 east (Causeway Drive) | East end of US 76 overlap |
| North Carolina | New Hanover | Wrightsville Beach | 450 | 720 | | Lumina Avenue | End of US 74 is 1.8 miles (2.9 km) from intersection, north on Lumina Avenue |
1.000 mi = 1.609 km; 1.000 km = 0.621 mi: Concurrency terminus; Incomplete access; Tolled; Unopened

== See also ==
- Special routes of U.S. Route 74
- North Carolina Bicycle Route 2
- North Carolina Bicycle Route 5
