= U.S. Route 129 in North Carolina =

Segment of American highway

U.S. Highway 129
- US 129 highlighted in red

Route information
- Auxiliary route of US 29
- Maintained by NCDOT
- Length: 63.5 mi (102.2 km)
- Existed: 1934–present

Major junctions
- South end: US 19 / US 129 / SR 11 at the Georgia state line near Bellview
- US 64 / US 74 in Ranger; US 64 in Murphy; US 19 / US 74 in Topton
- North end: US 129 / SR 115 at the Tennessee state line at Deals Gap

Location
- Country: United States
- State: North Carolina
- Counties: Cherokee, Graham, Swain

Highway system
- United States Numbered Highway System; List; Special; Divided; North Carolina Highway System; Interstate; US; State; Scenic
← NC 128	→ NC 130

U.S. Route 129 (US 129) is a north–south United States highway that travels 63.5 miles (102.2 km) through the westernmost part of North Carolina. Traveling from the Georgia state line near Bellview, to the Tennessee state line at Deals Gap, it is known for its scenic mountain valley vistas and curvy mountain bends popular with motorcycle and sports car enthusiasts.

== Route description ==
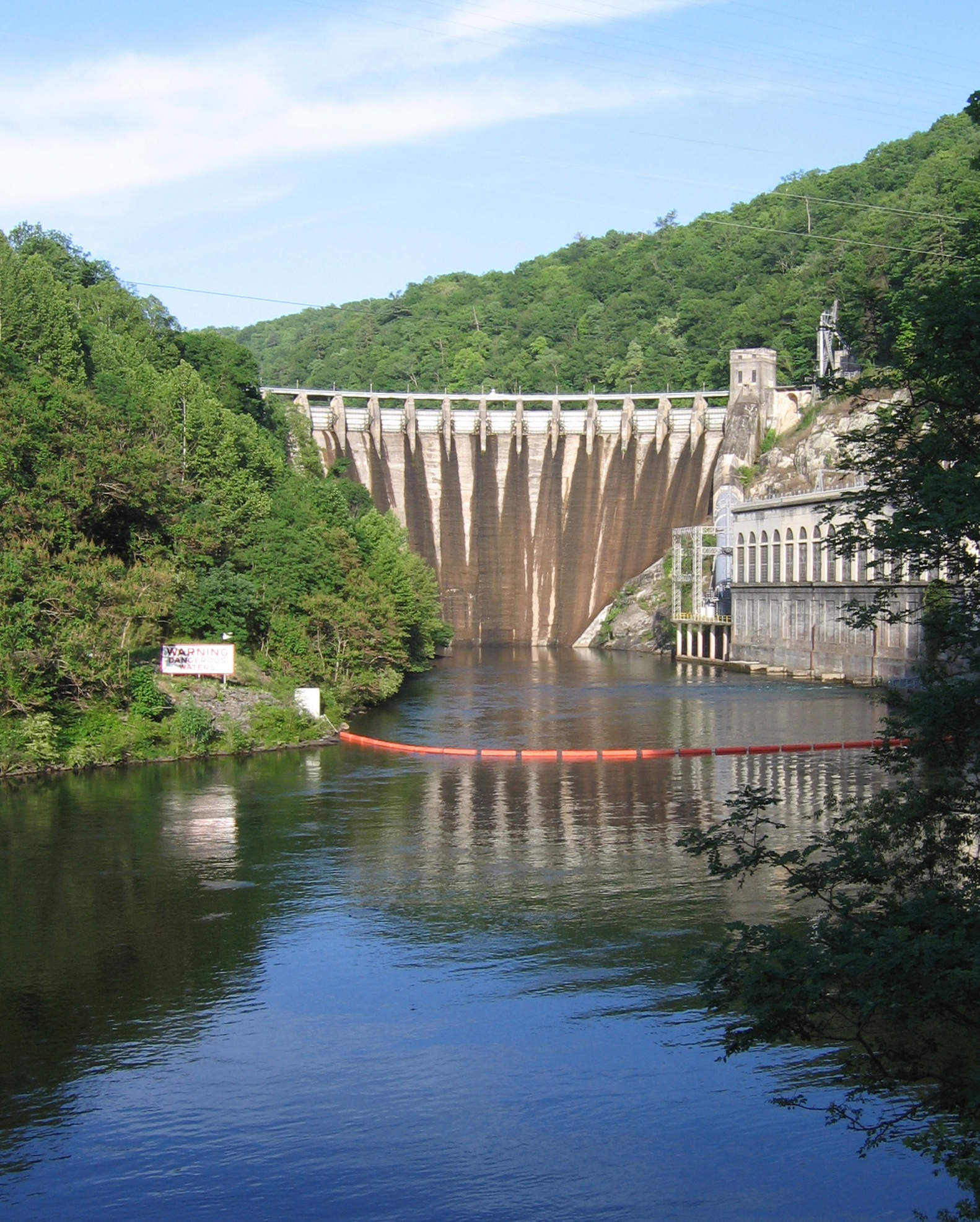
Cheoah Dam

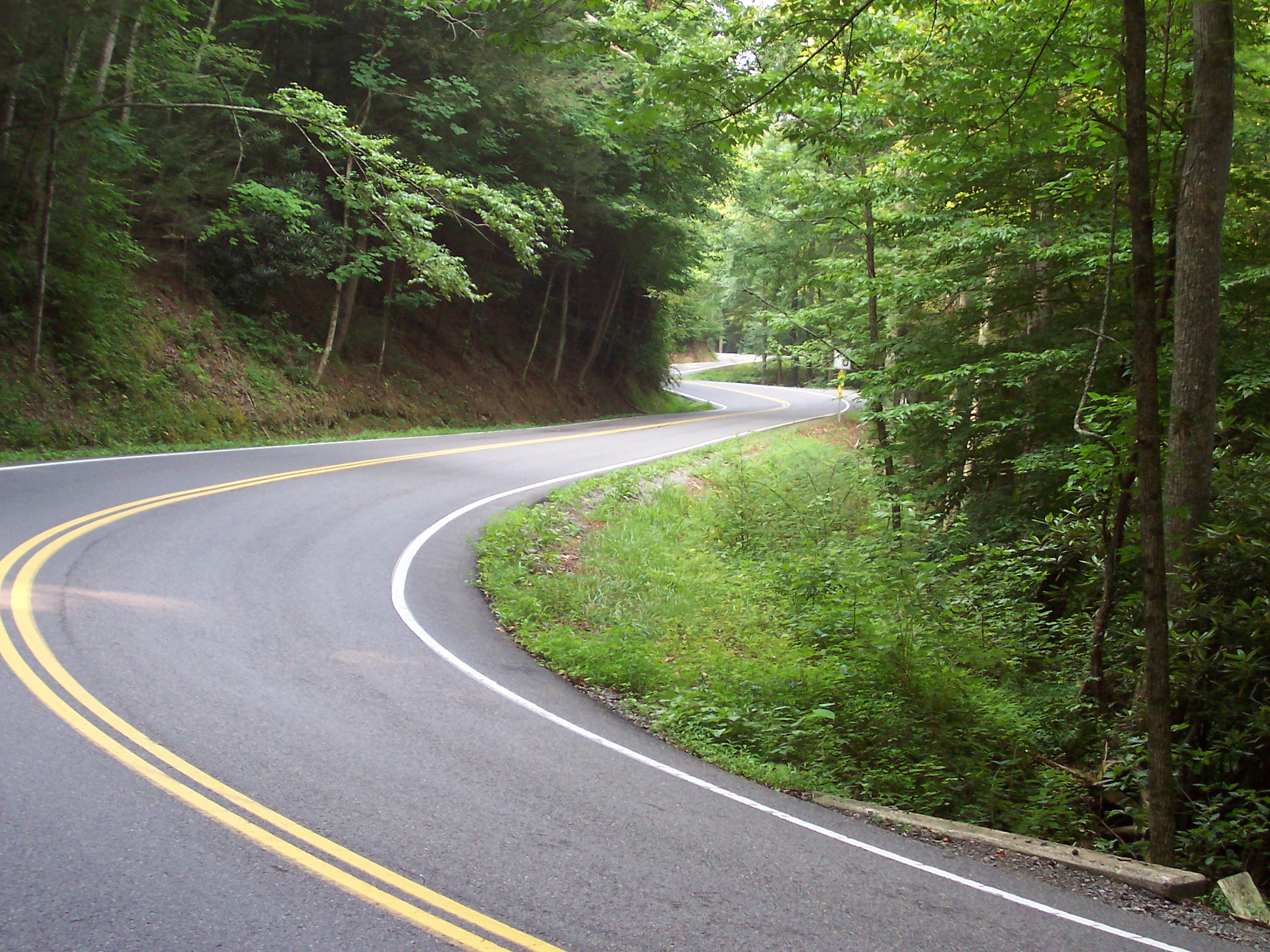
"The Tail of the Dragon" on US 129

US 129, in concurrency with US 19, begins at the Georgia state line near the community of Bellview. At 3.8 miles (6.1 km) in, it reaches the community of Ranger, where US 129/US 19 links up with four-lane US 64/US 74, heading northeast. In Murphy, US 64 splits away, after crossing the Hiwassee River, and heads east towards Hayesville. Bypassing east of Murphy along Will Scott Mountain, the highway traverses along the banks of the Valley River to Andrews, where it bypasses the town to its north. East of Andrews, the highway narrows to two lanes as it makes its way along the Snowbird Mountains. At Red Marble Gap is the community of Topton, which straddles closely to Cherokee, Macon and Graham counties; here US 129 splits from US 19/US 74 as it continues into the Nantahala Gorge towards Bryson City.

Now ascending along the Snowbird Mountains, the highway curves west and begins to descend as it follows the Tulula Creek into Robbinsville. NC 143 shares a short concurrency with US 129 while in Robbinsville, here is where motorcycle and sports car enthusiasts begin to appear as they connect here from the Cherohala Skyway and heads towards the Tail of the Dragon at Deals Gap. North of Robbinsville, US 129 curves along the banks of the Cheoah River until it reaches the Little Tennessee River at Tapoco. Crossing the Little Tennessee River and passing past the Cheoah Dam, US 129 connects with NC 28 before ascending again and crossing into Tennessee at Deals Gap.

US 129 also makes up part of Corridor K in the Appalachian Development Highway System (ADHS). Corridor K connects Interstate 75 (I-75) in Cleveland, Tennessee with US 23 in Dillsboro, North Carolina, overlapping 29.5 miles (47.5 km) of US 129. ADHS provides additional funds, as authorized by the U.S. Congress, which have enabled US 129 to benefit from the successive improvements along its routing through the corridor. The white-on-blue banner "Appalachian Highway" is used to mark the ADHS corridor.

US 129 overlaps with two state scenic byways: the Nantahala Byway between Marble and Topton, and the Indian Lake Scenic Byway, between Topton and Deals Gap.

== History ==
The highway was established in 1934 as an extension from Georgia following US 19 to Topton, where it replaced NC 108 through Robbinsville and on into Tennessee. In 1979, US 19/US 129 were placed on new bypass routings east of Murphy and north of Andrews; its old alignment becoming US 19 business loops.

On December 2, 2020, six miles of U.S. 129 in Graham County, from Yellow Creek near Robbinsville to the Swain County line, was designated Ronnie Milsap Highway.

== Junction list ==
County	Location	mi	km	Destinations	Notes
Cherokee		0.0	0.0	US 19 south / US 129 south / SR 11 south – Blairsville	Continuation into Georgia
Cherokee	Ranger	3.8	6.1	US 64 west / US 74 west – Cleveland	West end of US 64/US 74 overlap
Cherokee	Murphy	9.0	14.5	US 19 Bus. north (Hiwassee Street)	
Cherokee	Murphy	9.4	15.1	US 64 east – Hayesville, Franklin	East end of US 64 overlap
Cherokee		12.2	19.6	US 19 Bus. south (Andrews Road)	
Cherokee	Marble	18.3	29.5	NC 141 south	
Cherokee	Andrews	23.6	38.0	US 19 Bus. north (Main Street) / Airport Road – Western Carolina Regional Airport	
Cherokee	Andrews	26.5	42.6	US 19 Bus. south (Main Street)	
Cherokee	Topton	33.5	53.9	US 19 north / US 74 east (Appalachian Highway) – Bryson City	North end of US 19 and east end of US 74 overlap
Graham	Robbinsville	44.8	72.1	NC 143 Bus. west (Main Street)	West end of NC 143 Business overlap
Graham	Robbinsville	45.0	72.4	NC 143 east (Sweetwater Road) – Fontana, Bryson City	East end of NC 143 and NC 143 Business overlap
Graham	Robbinsville	45.4	73.1	NC 143 Bus. east (Main Street)	
Graham		46.4	74.7	NC 143 west (Massey Branch Road) – Tellico Plains	West end of NC 143 overlap, to Cherohala Skyway
Swain	Deals Gap	62.8	101.1	NC 28 south – Fontana, Bryson City	
Swain	Deals Gap	63.5	102.2	US 129 north / SR 115 north – Maryville	Crosses through Deals Gap into Tennessee
1.000 mi = 1.609 km; 1.000 km = 0.621 mi: Concurrency terminus

== See also ==
U.S. Route 129
Previous state: Georgia	North Carolina	Next state: Tennessee
