= North Carolina Highway 141 =

State highway in Cherokee County, North Carolina, US

North Carolina Highway 141

Route information
- Maintained by NCDOT
- Length: 8.7 mi (14.0 km)
- Existed: 1983–present

Major junctions
- South end: US 64 near Murphy
- North end: US 19 / US 74 / US 129 in Marble

Location
- Country: United States
- State: North Carolina
- Counties: Cherokee

Highway system
- North Carolina Highway System; Interstate; US; State; Scenic
| ← I-140 | → NC 142 |

North Carolina Highway 141 (NC 141) is a primary state highway in the U.S. state of North Carolina. It serves to connect the Peachtree community, located in the Valley River Mountains, with Marble and Murphy.

== Route description ==
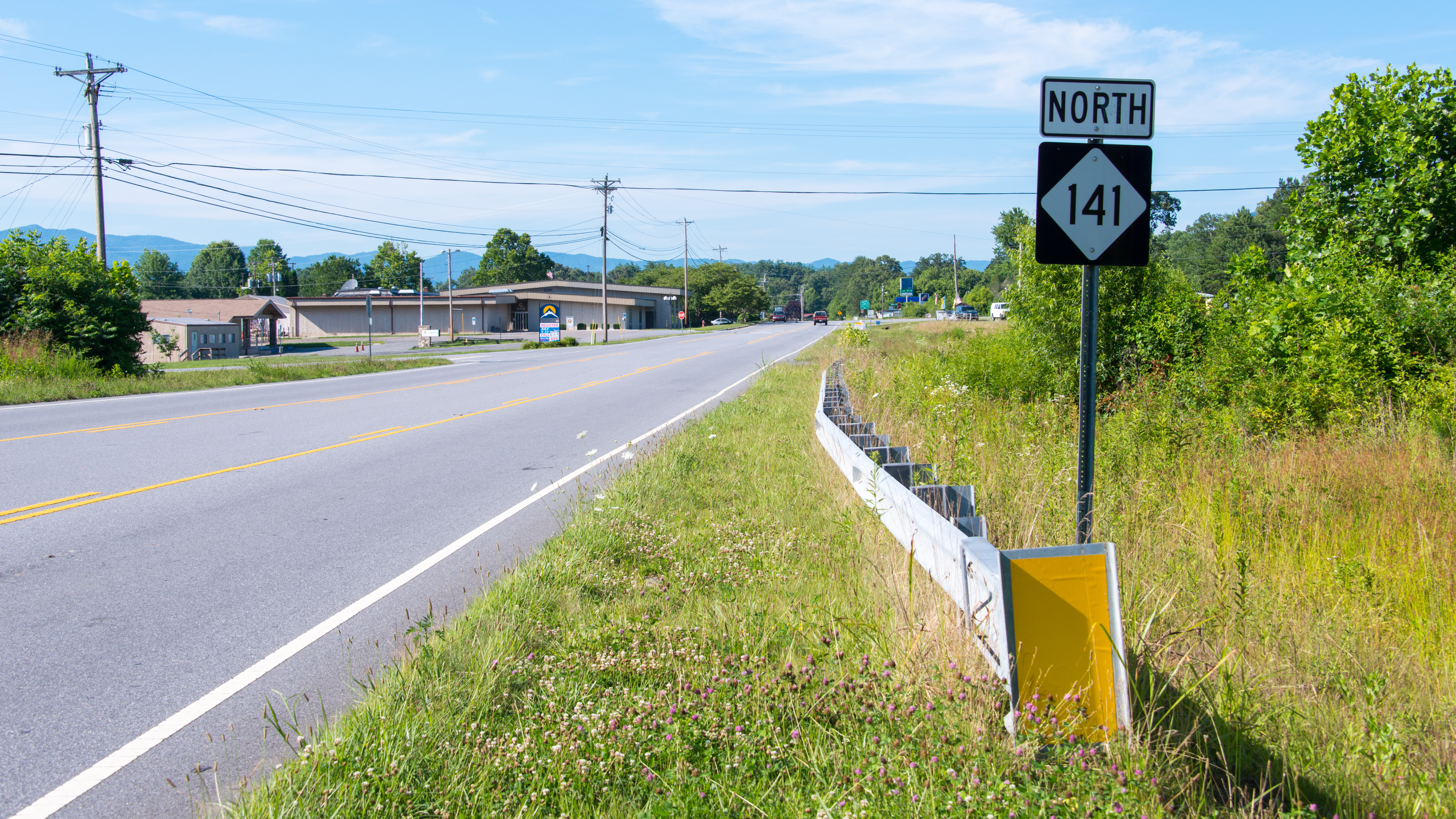
NC 141 along East US 64 Alt.

The entire 8.7-mile (14.0 km) length of NC 141 is contained within Cherokee County. The southern terminus of the highway is at U.S. Route 64 (US 64) between Murphy and Hayesville (north of the community of Brasstown). Its northern terminus is at US 19/US 129/US 74 and Marble Road in Marble.

The route serves as an important transportation link across Cherokee County providing access for traffic from Marble and Andrews to the Peachtree community where Erlanger Western Carolina Hospital, the area's only major hospital, and Tri-County Community College are located. Conversely, the reverse route provides quick access from these areas, as well as Hayesville to the Andrews-Murphy Airport.

The route passes through several small communities along the way from Marble to Peachtree, including Vengeance Creek and Rowland Hill.

== History ==
The first NC 141 was established in 1954 as a new primary routing from US 74/US 76 to NC 53 near Atkinson. In 1974, NC 141 was replaced by NC 11.

The second and current NC 141 was established around 1983 as a new primary routing from US 64 to US 19 and US 129. In 2010, NC 141 was extended south over a former section of US 64 (named East US 64 Alt.) and ends at a new terminus with US 64.

== Junction list ==
The entire route is in Cherokee County.

| Location | mi | km | Destinations | Notes |
|---|---|---|---|---|
| | 0.0 | 0.0 | US 64 – Murphy, Hayesville | |
| Marble | 8.7 | 14.0 | US 19 / US 74 / US 129 – Cherokee | |
1.000 mi = 1.609 km; 1.000 km = 0.621 mi
