= North Carolina Highway 143 =

State highway in Graham County, North Carolina, US

North Carolina Highway 143

Route information
- Maintained by NCDOT
- Length: 38.3 mi (61.6 km)
- Existed: 1979–present
- Tourist routes: Cherohala Skyway

Major junctions
- West end: SR 165 at the Tennessee state line
- US 129 in Robbinsville
- East end: NC 28 near Stecoah

Location
- Country: United States
- State: North Carolina
- Counties: Graham

Highway system
- North Carolina Highway System; Interstate; US; State; Scenic
← NC 142	→ NC 144

North Carolina Highway 143 (NC 143) is a primary state highway in the U.S. state of North Carolina. It runs from the Tennessee state line to NC 28, near the community of Stecoah. It is best known for its 18-mile (29 km) section of the Cherohala Skyway, shared with Tennessee State Route 165.

== Route description ==
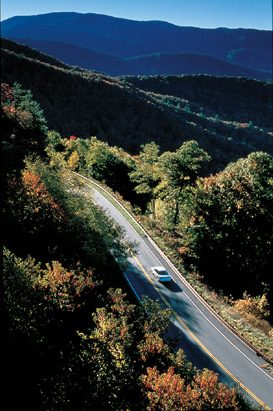
Cherohala Skyway in early autumn

NC 143 begins at the Tennessee state line at Beech Gap, along the Unicoi Crest. For the next eighteen miles (29 km), known as the Cherohala Skyway, the highway stays along mostly the north-side of the Johns Knob, Little Haw Knob, Haw Knob, Hooper Bald, and Cedar Top, before descending at the Santeetlah Gap. The overall driving experience is similar to the Blue Ridge Parkway; it has the same maximum speed of 45 mph (72 km/h), and during winter the road is not maintained against snow and ice. At Snowbird Road, NC 143 Business begins going at a southerly route, through Milltown, into Robbinsville, as the mainline goes north.

The next eleven miles (18 km) of highway is completely different, as NC 143 goes along the southern banks of Lake Santeetlah, which has a lot of twist and turns, though not much on elevation changes. North of Robbinsville, it joins a concurrency with US 129 as it goes south into town. Within the town limits, the highway is called the Rodney Orr Bypass, named in honor of NASCAR driver Rodney Orr (approved on April 7, 1995). Meeting back with NC 143 Business, at Main Street, followed by US 129 split one-half mile (0.80 km) later continuing south towards Andrews; NC 143 continues east along Sweetwater Road out of town.

The last 3.6 miles (5.8 km) of NC 143 feature steep elevation changes. From Orr Branch Road (elevation 2,300 feet (700 m)), the road climbs ups the southwestern side of the Cheoah Mountains. At Stechoah Gap, the NC 143 peaks at an elevation of 3,165 feet (965 m) (this is also where the Appalachian Trail meets). The highway goes north along the eastern side of the Cheoah Mountains, reaching NC 28 at Johnson Gap (elevation 2,523 feet (769 m)).

NC 143 is part of one scenic byway in the state (indicated by a Scenic Byways sign). Cherohala Skyway is an 18-mile (29 km) byway and National Scenic Byway in western Graham County. It is known as a connector between the Cherokee National Forest and the Nantahala National Forest, thus the name Cherohala. The entire route offers scenic views of unspoiled forested mountains in Western North Carolina.

== History ==
In 1979, NC 143 was established as a new primary route between Robbinsville and Stecoah, on already existing roads. Topography maps of Graham County in the early 1990s show an incomplete Cherohala Skyway already numbered as NC 143; however, this was not official until October 12, 1996, when NC 143 was extended to a completed Cherohala Skyway and its current western terminus at the Tennessee state line.

The Cherohala Skyway segment dates earlier than NC 143 (1962), but was not completed until 1996 with a total cost of $100 million over the whole 34 years of construction.

In 2022, a groundbreaking ceremony was held for 'corridor K' improvement project of which NC 143 was a part of.

== Future ==
As a part of 'corridor K' improvements the NCDOT plans to construct road alignments, increase the shoulder width, and add passing and climbing lanes on NC143. Sidewalks are planned to be constructed next to NC 143 from Robbinsville High School to the U.S. 129 intersection. The plan also includes the construct a wildlife crossing for safe passage of wildlife at Stecoah Gap to offset any impact associated with the widening of NC 143.

== Junction list ==
The entire route is in Graham County.

Location	mi	km	Destinations	Notes
	0.0	0.0	SR 165 west (Cherohala Skyway)	Tennessee state line
	24.6	39.6	NC 143 Bus. east (Snowbird Road)	Western terminus of NC 143 Bus.
	28.1	45.2	US 129 north (Tapoco Road) – Tapoco, Maryville	West end of US 129 overlap
Robbinsville	29.1	46.8	NC 143 Bus. west (Main Street)	Eastern terminus of NC 143 Bus.
Robbinsville	29.5	47.5	US 129 south (Rodney Orr Bypass)	East end of US 129 overlap
Stecoah	38.3	61.6	NC 28 (Fontana Road) – Fontana, Bryson City	
1.000 mi = 1.609 km; 1.000 km = 0.621 mi: Concurrency terminus

== Business route ==
North Carolina Highway 143 Business
- Location: Robbinsville
- Length: 3.4 mi (5.5 km)
- Existed: 1997–present

NC 143 Business (NC 143 Bus.) is a business route of NC 143 established in February 1997. The 3.4-mile-long (5.5 km) route begins west of the town at NC 143 and travels east along Snowbird Road and through downtown Robbinsville via Junaluksa Road and Main Streets. It meets back with NC 143 and US 129 on Rodney Orr Bypass. Historically, NC 143 has never been routed through Robbinsville; though US 129 did before the bypass.
