= Topton =

Topton may refer to:

- Topton, North Carolina
- Topton, Pennsylvania
