= North Carolina Highway 28 =

State highway in North Carolina, US

North Carolina Highway 28

Route information
- Maintained by NCDOT
- Length: 81.2 mi (130.7 km)
- Existed: 1938–present
- Tourist routes: Mountain Waters Scenic Byway; Fontana Byway

Major junctions
- South end: SR 28 at the Georgia state line near Satolah, GA
- US 64 in Highlands; US 23 / US 64 / US 441 in Franklin; US 19 / US 74 in Lauada
- North end: US 129 in Deals Gap

Location
- Country: United States
- State: North Carolina
- Counties: Macon, Swain, Graham

Highway system
- North Carolina Highway System; Interstate; US; State; Scenic
← NC 27	→ US 29

North Carolina Highway 28 (NC 28) is an 81.2-mile-long (130.7 km) primary state highway in the U.S. state of North Carolina. The highway runs north–south through the Nantahala National Forest in Western North Carolina.

== Route description ==
NC 28 is part of a three-state highway 28, that totals 238 miles (383 km), from Beech Island, South Carolina to Deals Gap. Southward the road continues as Georgia State Route 28. This is the sole state highway that keeps its exact number as it crosses between Georgia and North Carolina. It heads southeast briefly through Georgia, enters South Carolina as South Carolina Highway 28, re-enters Georgia once more before terminating in South Carolina.

NC 28 starts at the Georgia state line in Macon County. From the state line, it follows a winding course northwards to Highlands. There it begins a 14-mile (23 km) concurrency with U.S. Route 64 (US 64) on the way northwest to Franklin. Following an interchange with US 23 and US 441, the US 64 concurrency ends and enters the downtown business district of the city. NC 28 forms a concurrency with US 441 Business on the one-way pair of Main Street and Palmer Street. The two roads cross the Little Tennessee River before NC 28 breaks off and heads north out of the city on Harrison Avenue. Though the official routing of the highway is along Harrison Avenue, signage shows NC 28 traveling along Depot Street and Riverview Street bypassing the city downtown.

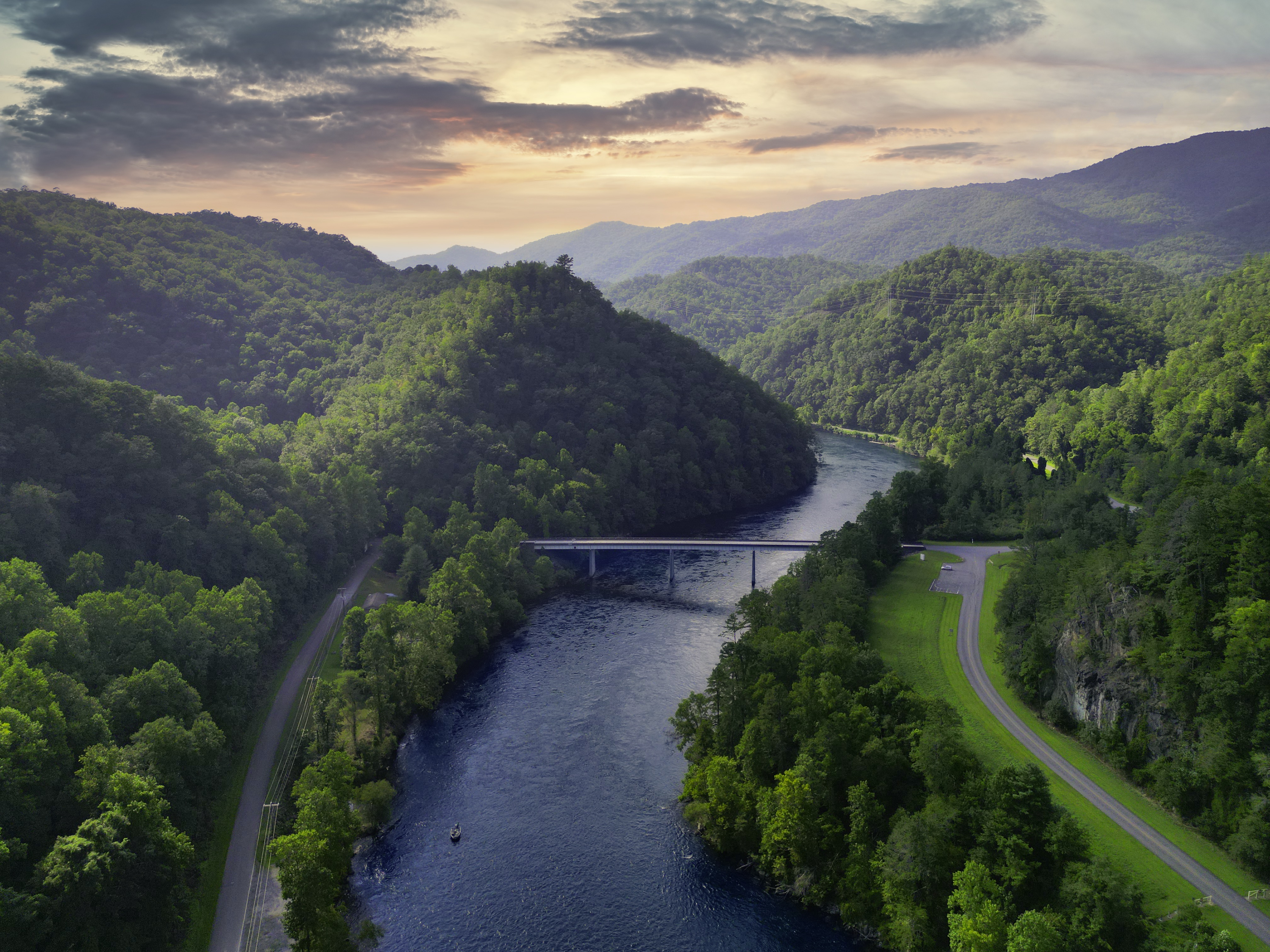
N.C. Highway 28 Bridge south of Fontana Dam was built in 1945 and spans the Little Tennessee River

From Franklin it travels north-northwest, mostly following the Little Tennessee River valley. There is a 3-mile (4.8 km) concurrency with US 19 and US 74 between the unincorporated communities of Lauada and Needmore. From Needmore, it follows a westerly course along the southern shore of man-made Fontana Lake. A side road crosses the TVA constructed Fontana Dam; NC 28 skirts the southern boundary of the Great Smoky Mountains National Park before reaching its northern terminus at US 129.

NC 28 overlaps with two state scenic byways: the Waterfall Byway, between Highlands and Franklin, and the Indian Lake Scenic Byway, between Almond and Deals Gap. NC 28 also overlaps parts of the Mountain Waters Scenic Byway, a National Forest Scenic Byway, that traverses through the Nantahala National Forest.

== History ==
Established in 1938 as the third and current NC 28, it traversed from Georgia to Highlands, where it duplexed with US 64 to Franklin. Continuing northeast from Franklin, it replaced NC 286 to end at US 19, in Lauada. In 1940, NC 28 was extended northeast along US 19 through Bryson City and Ela, then replaced part of NC 107, ending in Cherokee. In 1947, NC 28 was truncated back to its former northern terminus; its former routing to Cherokee becoming US 19A. In 1954, NC 28 was extended southwest along US 19 to Almond and then northwest along new primary routing to Fontana, then replaced NC 288 to its current northern terminus at Deals Gap. In 1974, NC 28 was adjusted to one-way streets in downtown Franklin, in concurrency with US 441 Bus, via Main Street and Palmer Street.

The first NC 28 was an original state highway that traversed from NC 10, in Andrews, through Franklin, Highlands, Rosman, Brevard and Hendersonville, to NC 20, in Bat Cave. In 1923, NC 28 was rerouted west of Franklin on new primary routing to Elf and Hayesville, then replacing NC 109 from Hayesville to NC 10, in Murphy. In 1929, NC 28 was extended west from Murphy along new primary routing to the Tennessee state line. In 1932, NC 28 was extended northeast along new primary routing from Bat Cave to Old Fort, where it overlapped with US 70 to Marion; going north from Marion, in concurrency with US 221, it traversed through Linville, Boone and Jefferson (replacing NC 691 in the process) to US 21/NC 26, in Twin Oaks, reaching its high point at 335 miles (539 km) long. Also in 1932, US 64 was assigned along NC 28 from the Tennessee state line to Old Fort. In 1934, all of NC 28 was decommissioned in favor of US 64 and US 221.

The second NC 28 existed from 1935-1938, where it had replaced NC 21 between Fayetteville and Delco, through Elizabethtown. It was renumbered as NC 87.

=== North Carolina Highway 282 ===
North Carolina Highway 282
- Location: Georgia state line–Highlands
- Length: 6.2 mi (10.0 km)
- Existed: 1930–1938

North Carolina Highway 282 (NC 282) was established as a new primary routing from the Georgia state line to Highlands. In 1938, NC 282 was renumbered as part of NC 28.

=== North Carolina Highway 286 ===
North Carolina Highway 286
- Location: Georgia state line–Lauada
- Existed: 1921–1938

North Carolina Highway 286 (NC 286) was an original state highway that began from the Georgia state line, near Otto, to NC 10, along Old Alarka Road. In 1927, NC 286 was renumbered as an extension of NC 285, from the Georgia state line to Franklin. Around 1938, NC 286 was replaced by NC 28 and moved to the north terminus to the community of Swain (today known as Lauada).

=== North Carolina Highway 288 ===
North Carolina Highway 288
- Location: Deals Gap–Fontana
- Length: 10.7 mi (17.2 km)
- Existed: 1951–1954

North Carolina Highway 288 (NC 288) was a primary route that served the Fontana area from 1929-1944 and revived again from 1951-1954. The first NC 288 traversed from NC 108, in Deals Gap, to NC 10, in Bryson City. In 1942, construction began on Fontana Dam; which by 1944, NC 288 was decommissioned when a majority of the route was submerged. Various sections of the old highway still exist on higher ground and are incorporated in hiking trails that are easily reachable from the Fontana Dam parking area. The second NC 288 was a return along the western part of the highway that wasn't submerged, linking to the relocated Fontana community. In 1954, new construction was completed between Fontana and Almond, and all of NC 288 was renumbered NC 28.

NC 288 was originally to be rebuilt along the north shore of Fontana Lake by the National Park Service, an agreement that was made between the county, state, and federal government. Construction of New Fontana Road (SR 1364) was completed in 1958, connecting Bryson City to the border of the Great Smoky Mountains National Park. From 1960-1970, 6.3 miles (10.1 km) was built within the park, which was called Lakeview Drive; ending just west of a tunnel, that went through aptly named Tunnel Ridge. Since then, questions about the cost of building the highway and the environmental impact of the road had stopped all further construction. Known unofficially as "the Road to Nowhere," it provides access to various hiking trails within the National Park. After being in limbo for forty years, it was finally resolved in February 2010 when the U.S. Department of Interior signed a settlement agreement paying Swain County $52 million instead of building the highway. As of September 2017, only $12.8 million of that has been paid. Four million additional dollars were released by Interior Secretary Ryan Zinke, and the final installment of $35.2 million was paid on June 29, 2018. However, under a 2010 agreement, the money was deposited with the state treasurer's office. Swain County can spend only the interest the money earns.

== Major intersections ==
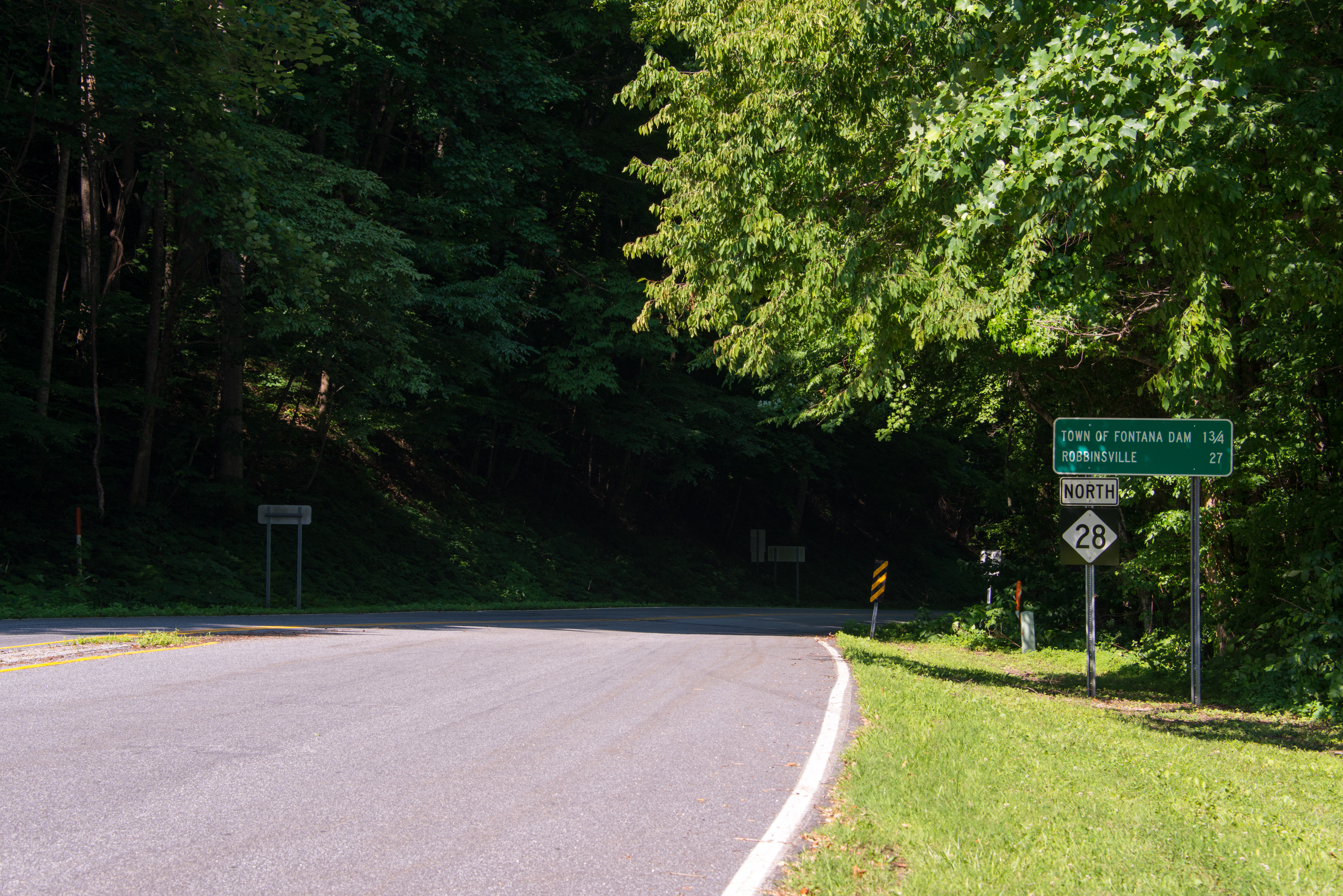
NC 28 approaching the Town of Fontana Dam

County	Location	mi	km	Destinations	Notes
Macon		0.0	0.0	SR 28 south – Walhalla	Continuation from Georgia
Macon	Highlands	6.1	9.8	US 64 east (Main Street) – Cashiers	East end of US 64 overlap
Macon	Highlands	6.5	10.5	NC 106 west (Dillard Road) – Dillard	
Macon	Franklin	23.3	37.5	US 23 / US 64 west / US 441 (Sylva Road) – Sylva, Clayton, Murphy	West end of US 64 overlap; diamond interchange
Macon	Franklin	24.6	39.6	US 441 Bus. north (Main Street)	North end of US 441 Business overlap
Macon	Franklin	25.6	41.2	US 441 Bus. south (Porter Street)	South end of US 441 Business overlap
Swain	Lauada	46.2	74.4	US 19 north / US 74 east – Bryson City	North end of US 19 and east end of US 74 overlap
Swain	Almond	49.2	79.2	US 19 north / US 74 east – Andrews, Murphy	South end of US 19 and west end of US 74 overlap
Graham	Stecoah	60.7	97.7	NC 143 west (Sweetwater Road) – Robbinsville	
Swain	Deals Gap	81.0	130.4	US 129 (Tapoco Road) – Tapoco, Robbinsville, Maryville, Knoxville	Northern terminus
1.000 mi = 1.609 km; 1.000 km = 0.621 mi: Concurrency terminus

== See also ==
- North Carolina Bicycle Route 2 - concurrent with NC 28 from Cullasaja to downtown Franklin
