= Lauada, North Carolina =

- Unincorporated community
- Location within North Carolina Location within the United States
- Coordinates: 35°22′22″N 83°30′15″W
- Country: United States
- State: North Carolina
- County: Swain
- Elevation: 1,959 ft (597 m)
- Time zone: UTC-5 (Eastern (EST))
  - Summer (DST): UTC-4 (EDT)
- Area code: 828
- GNIS feature ID: 1012685

Lauada is an unincorporated community in Swain County, North Carolina, United States. Lauada is located at the junction of U.S. Route 19, U.S. Route 74, and North Carolina Highway 28 5.1 miles (8.2 km) southwest of Bryson City. The SCC Swain Center, a satellite location of Southwestern Community College, is located here.

== History ==
Lauada Cemetery, located here, was created in 1943 during the construction of Fontana Lake to move grave sites from multiple cemeteries that now lie under the lake. More than 1000 graves were moved to the cemetery upon its creation.
