= Topton, North Carolina =

- Unincorporated community
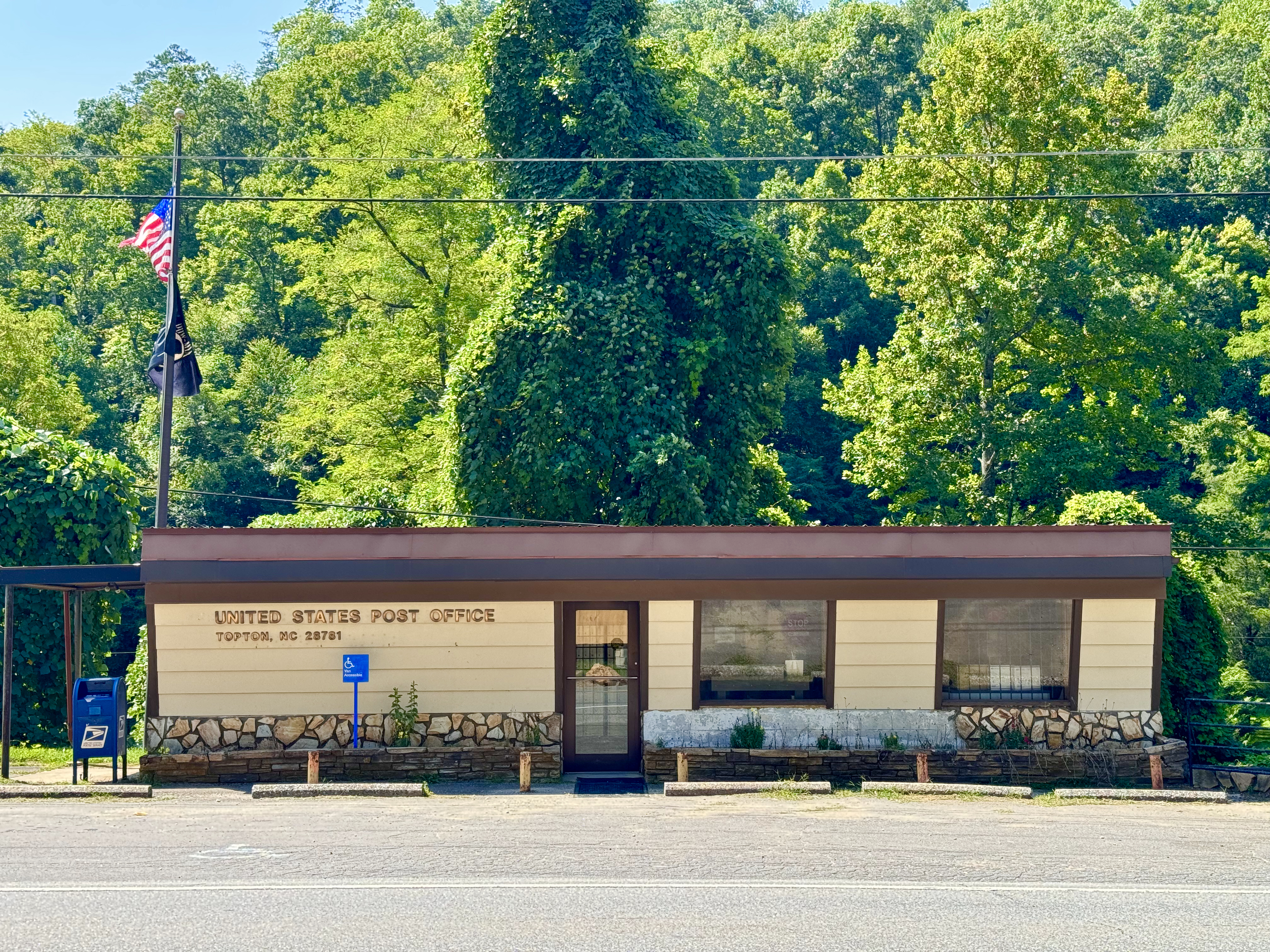
- The U.S. Post Office at Topton

- Location within North Carolina Location within the United States
- Coordinates: 35°14′49″N 83°42′12″W
- Country: United States
- State: North Carolina
- County: Cherokee
- Elevation: 2,654 ft (809 m)
- Time zone: UTC-5 (Eastern (EST))
  - Summer (DST): UTC-4 (EDT)
- ZIP code: 28781
- Area code: 828
- GNIS feature ID: 1022969

Topton is an unincorporated community in Cherokee County, North Carolina, United States. Topton is located on U.S. Route 19, U.S. Route 74, and U.S. Route 129, 7.5 miles (12.1 km) east-northeast of Andrews.

== History ==
Topton was named by David Samuel Russell. Around 1885, railroad executive Alexander Boyd Andrews placed Russell in charge of a commissary store at Red Marble Gap after the railroad reached the area. Topton's post office opened on December 12, 1887. It has the ZIP code 28781. Russell served as postmaster for its first two years before becoming the first mayor of nearby Andrews. A fire station was built in Topton around 1975. A community center was built in 1976.

Nantahala Community Library and Community Center opened next to Nantahala School in Topton on July 22, 2024. The library was previously located in a modular building at the school. It is part of the Fontana Regional Library system.
