= Almond, North Carolina =

- Unincorporated community
- Location within North Carolina Location within the United States
- Coordinates: 35°22′11″N 83°33′55″W
- Country: United States
- State: North Carolina
- County: Swain
- Named for: Bud Almond
- Elevation: 1,722 ft (525 m)
- Time zone: UTC-5 (Eastern (EST))
  - Summer (DST): UTC-4 (EDT)
- ZIP code: 28702
- Area code: 828
- GNIS feature ID: 1018806

Almond is an unincorporated community in Swain County, North Carolina, United States. Almond is located on the Little Tennessee River and North Carolina Highway 28 7.9 miles (12.7 km) west-southwest of Bryson City.

== History ==
Almond has a post office with ZIP code 28702, which opened on March 17, 1886. The community was named for Bud Almond, who provided the land on which the town was founded. At one time, Almond was a scheduled stop with a depot for the Southern Railway on the Murphy Branch.

During the construction of Fontana Dam, the post office, school, and railway depot located here were moved during 1943. Today, most of Almond is now covered by Fontana Lake.
