= Fontana Dam, North Carolina =

- Town
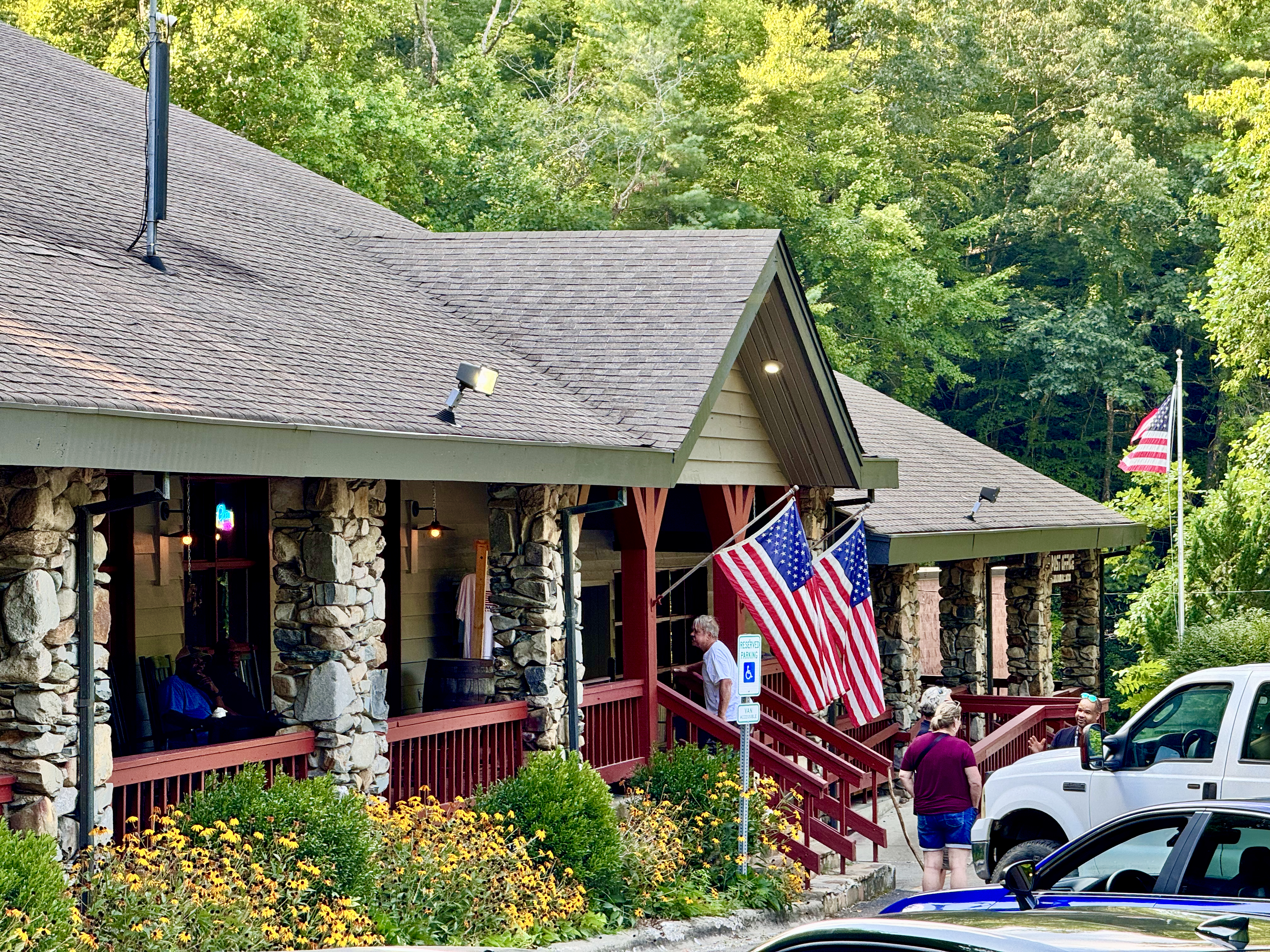
- Fontana Village General Store and U.S. Post Office

- Location within North Carolina Location within the United States
- Coordinates: 35°26′08″N 83°49′09″W
- Country: United States
- State: North Carolina
- County: Graham

Government
  - Mayor: Rob Hardy

Area
  - Total: 0.63 sq mi (1.62 km^{2})
  - Land: 0.63 sq mi (1.62 km^{2})
  - Water: 0 sq mi (0.00 km^{2})
- Elevation: 1,821 ft (555 m)

Population (2020)
  - Total: 13
  - Density: 20.8/sq mi (8.04/km^{2})
- Time zone: UTC-5 (Eastern (EST))
  - Summer (DST): UTC-4 (EDT)
- ZIP code: 28733
- Area code: 828
- GNIS feature ID: 1020300

Fontana Dam (also known as Fontana Village) is a town in Graham County, North Carolina, United States. Fontana Dam is located on North Carolina Highway 28 near the Fontana Dam and the Little Tennessee River. The town incorporated in 2011. As of the 2020 census, Fontana Dam had a population of 13.

== History ==
The first town called Fontana in North Carolina was a tent town of the Montvale Lumber Company in 1890. The name was given by Mrs. George Leidy Wood, wife of the vice-president of the company. A permanent town was constructed nearby in 1907 to support nearby copper mines, and an extension of the Murphy Branch of the Southern Railway was constructed from Bushnell, 15 miles away.

In January, 1942, construction of the Fontana Dam began, and by 1945 this original town had been evacuated.

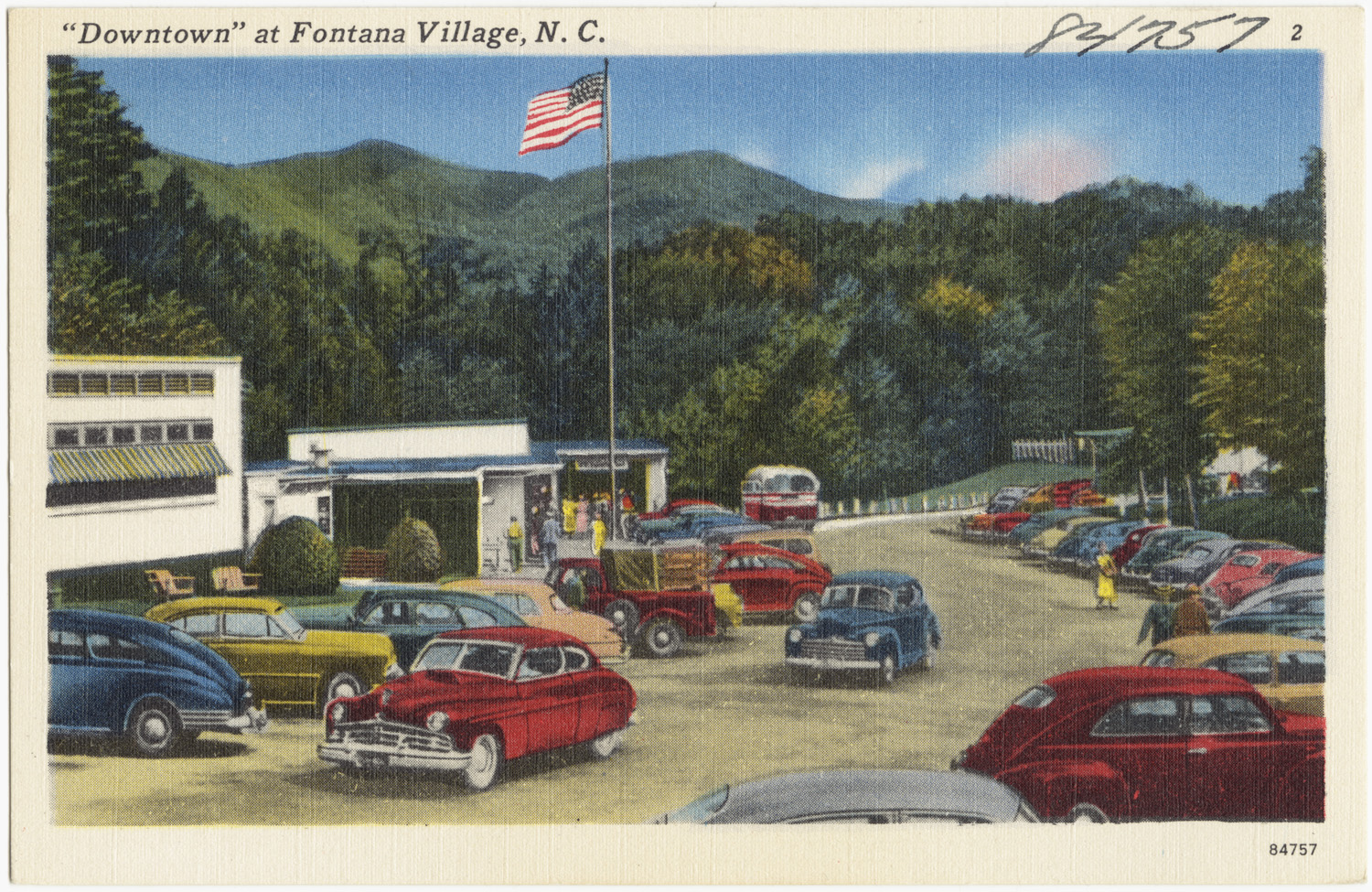
"Downtown" at Fontana Village, N. C, 1930 - 1945 (Tichnor Brothers collection)

The current town is based around the village built to support the dam construction from 1942 to 1944, so that the dam could produce electricity to power the ALCOA (Aluminum Company Of America) in nearby Alcoa, Tennessee which is south of Knoxville. The company was producing aluminum to make military aircraft during World War II. The cottages now rented out for visitors were employee houses. The dining hall is now a cafeteria and the commissary is now the village store. The old lodge was once a hospital and a school was also on the grounds. The children who grew up there during the dam construction times now have an association called "Dam Kids" and they keep in touch and have reunions. The Fontana Inn was dedicated on October 25, 1975.

The property was transferred to Guest Services of America (GSA) then sold to Peppertree Corporation of Asheville NC in 1987. The CEO, Wayne Kinzer was later convicted of a felony and the property changed hands several times thereafter. Police services were once handled by village company police of the resort, but with Kinzer's felony conviction, the agency disbanded. The TVA police also patrolled the property which was part of a 100-year ground lease from TVA. With the disbanding of TVA police in 2012, the Graham County Sheriff Department and the NC Highway Patrol are the only police services to the area now.

=== Incorporation ===
Fontana Dam incorporated as a Town in June 2011.

== Demographics ==
Historical population
Census	Pop.	Note	%±
2020	13		—
U.S. Decennial Census

=== 2020 census ===
Fontana Dam racial composition
Race	Number	Percentage
White (non-Hispanic)	11	84.62%
Black or African American (non-Hispanic)	0	0%
Native American	1	7.7%
Asian	0	0%
Pacific Islander	0	0%
Other/Mixed	0	0%
Hispanic or Latino	1	7.7%

At the 2020 census, there were 13 people and 4 households residing in the town. The population density was 20.97 inhabitants per square mile (8.10/km^{2}). There were 70 housing units at an average density of 112.90 per square mile (43.59/km^{2}). The racial composition of the city was: 84.62% White, 7.7% Hispanic or Latino American, and 7.7% Native American.

== Economy ==
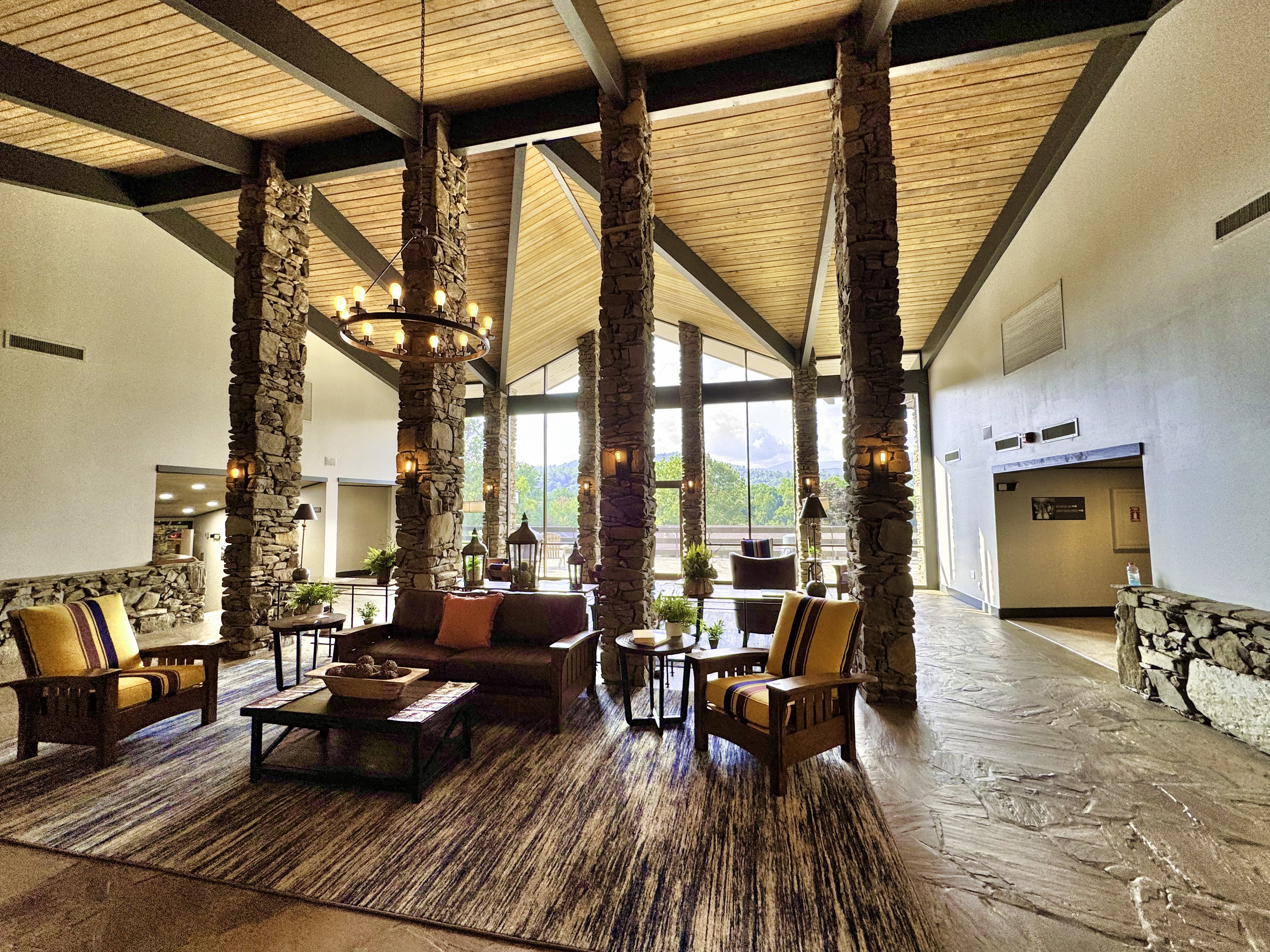
The lodge at Fontana Village Resort

The town's main employer is the Fontana Village Resort, which serves 100,000 visitors annually. Fontana Dam has a post office with ZIP code 28733. In addition to residents and resort guests, the post office also serves hikers on the Appalachian Trail, which crosses the Fontana Dam; it is the first post office on the trail north of its southern end in Georgia. The Fontana Dam post office was one of several scheduled to be closed in 2011, though the closings have since been postponed.
