= Western Carolina Regional Airport =

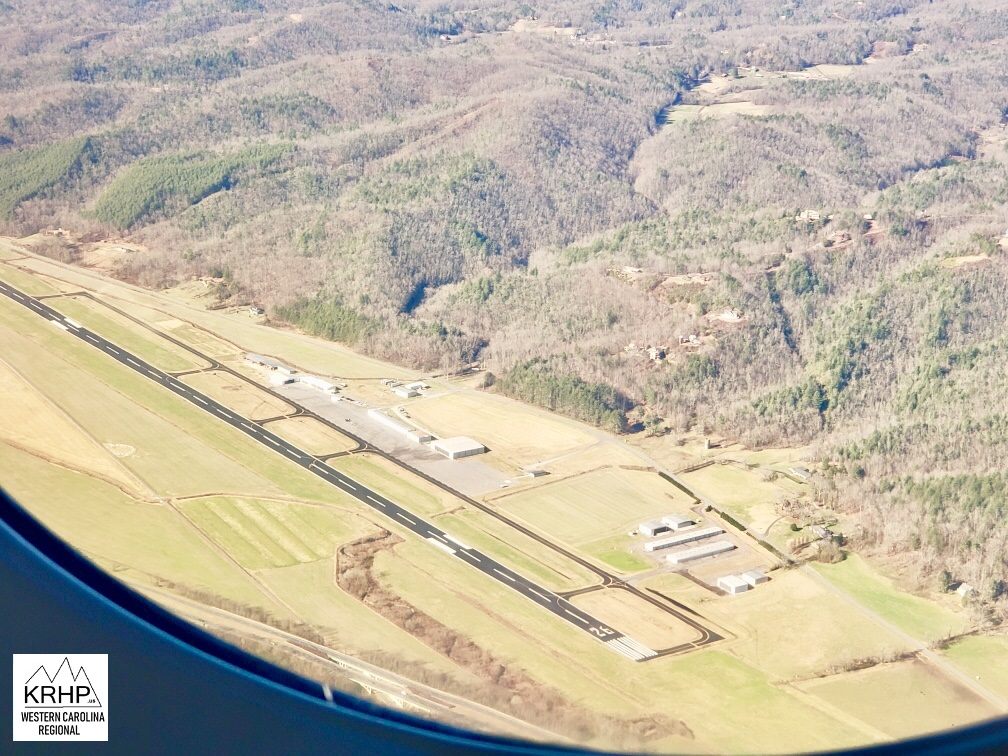
- IATA: none; ICAO: KRHP; FAA LID: RHP

Summary
- Airport type: Public
- Owner: Cherokee County
- Operator: Managing FBO Gayland Trull (70)
- Serves: Andrews, North Carolina
- Elevation AMSL: 1,697 ft (517 m)
- Coordinates: 35°11′43″N 083°51′47″W
- Website: westerncarolinaregional.us

Map
- Location of Western Carolina Regional Airport

Runways
Direction	Length		Surface
Direction	ft	m	Surface
8/26	5,500	1,676	Asphalt

Statistics (2020)
- Aircraft operations: 20,500
- Based aircraft: 42
- Source: Federal Aviation Administration

Western Carolina Regional Airport (ICAO: KRHP, FAA LID: RHP) is the westernmost general aviation airport in North Carolina. It is a county-owned public-use airport located 2 miles (3.2 km) west of the central business district of Andrews, in Cherokee County. It was formerly known as Andrews-Murphy Airport.

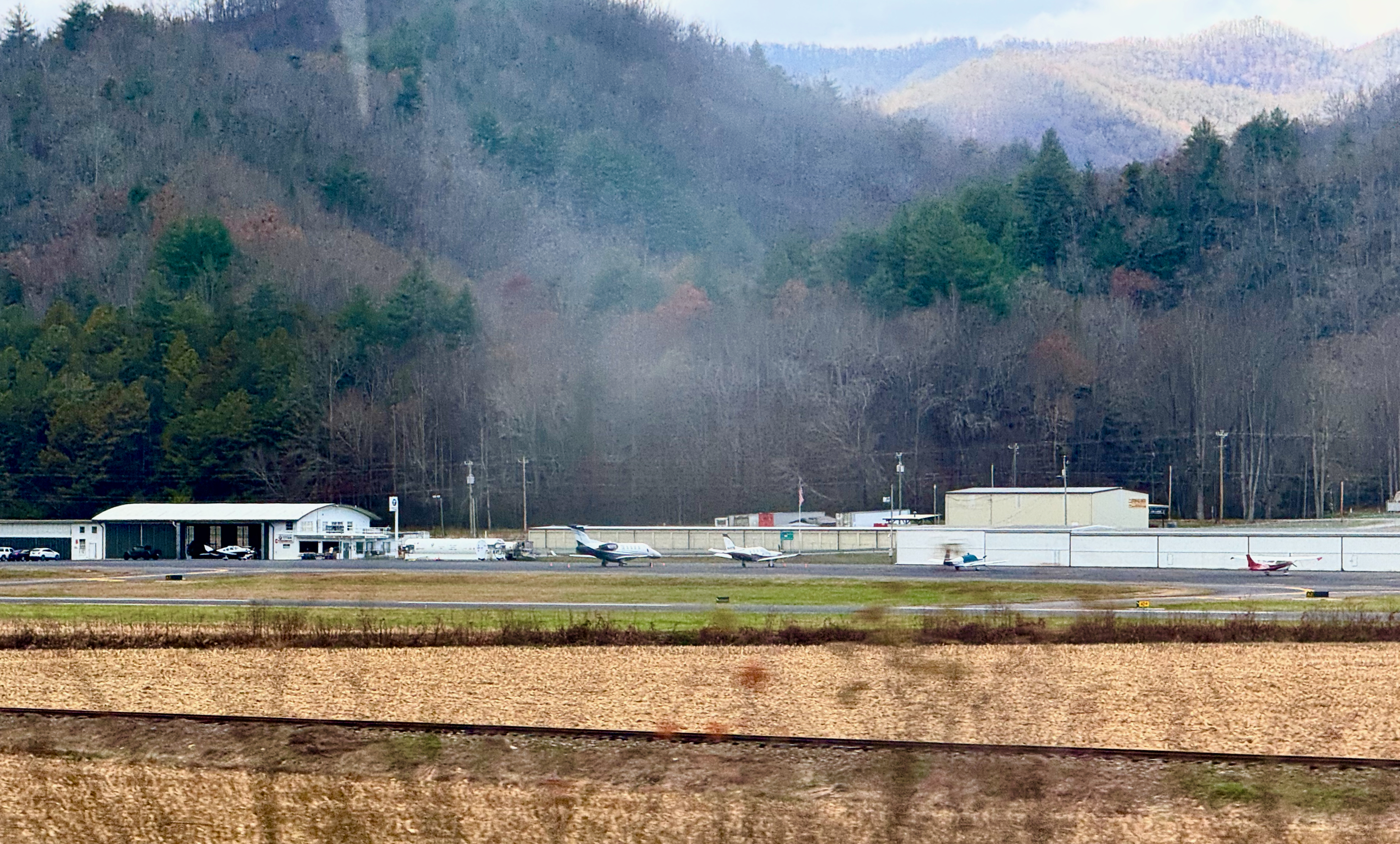
The airport in 2025

Although many U.S. airports use the same three-letter location identifier for the FAA and IATA, this facility is assigned RHP by the FAA and has no assignment from the IATA (which assigned RHP to Ramechhap, Nepal). The airport's ICAO identifier is KRHP.

Western Carolina Regional Airport supports 290 jobs and has a total annual economic output of more than $57 million. It results in personal income of more than $20 million per year in Cherokee and surrounding counties as of 2023.

== Airport history ==
In May 1945, a meeting at the Cherokee County Courthouse about constructing an airport drew around 200 people. Sites considered for the airport included land in Peachtree and a strip along the Hiwassee River in Murphy, but Edgar Augustus Wood Sr.’s property in Marble was most highly recommended. The airport was constructed in 1946 by Wood and colloquially known as Wood Field after its owner. It opened with a grass runway.

In the early 1960s, the airfield was regularly used by Berkshire Fine Spinning Associates, Burlington Industries, and the chicken industry. The U.S. Army and U.S. Forest Service used the airport as a base of operations for training and fire spotting respectively. In 1963 the road to the airport and parking lot were paved. In October of that year the first turboprop aircraft, a Grumman Gulfstream, landed at the airport.

The airport was purchased by Cherokee County in 1969 and renamed Andrews-Murphy Airport. That year the runway was lit and paved to accommodate larger jets. In 1999, the airport expanded, purchasing 18.1 acres from Robert and Evelyn Heaton for $252,000. The parking area was expanded in 2000. In 2009, the airport was again renamed Western Carolina Regional Airport. In 2015, an FAA inspection cited the airport for several violations going back years, such as hangars not paying fees. In 2016, four families living on the airport property were ordered to leave due to FAA regulations. In 2017, the airport terminal was named after local US Navy aviation veteran and longtime airport manager, Mr. Richard Parker.

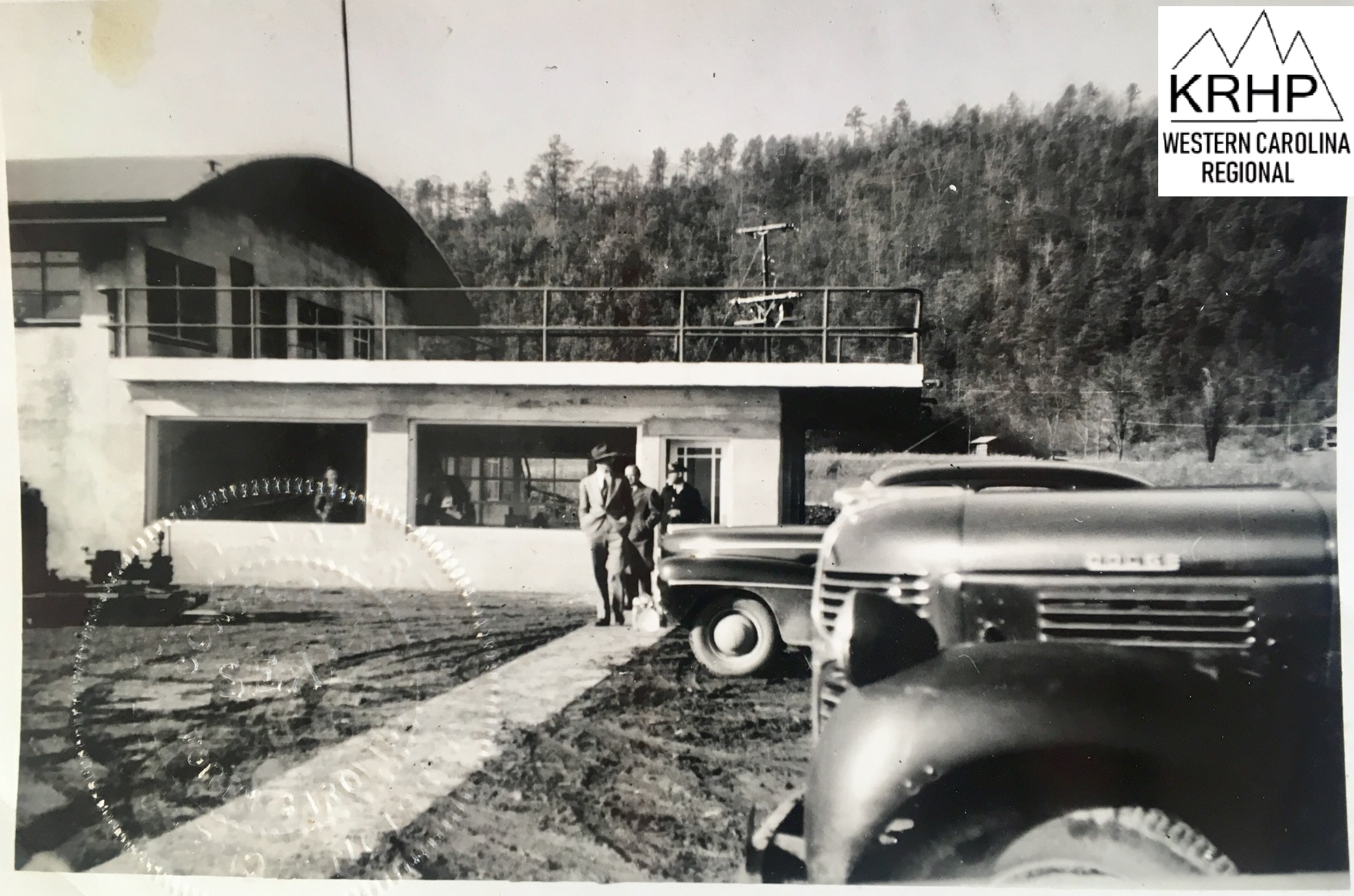
1947 Western Carolina Regional Airport

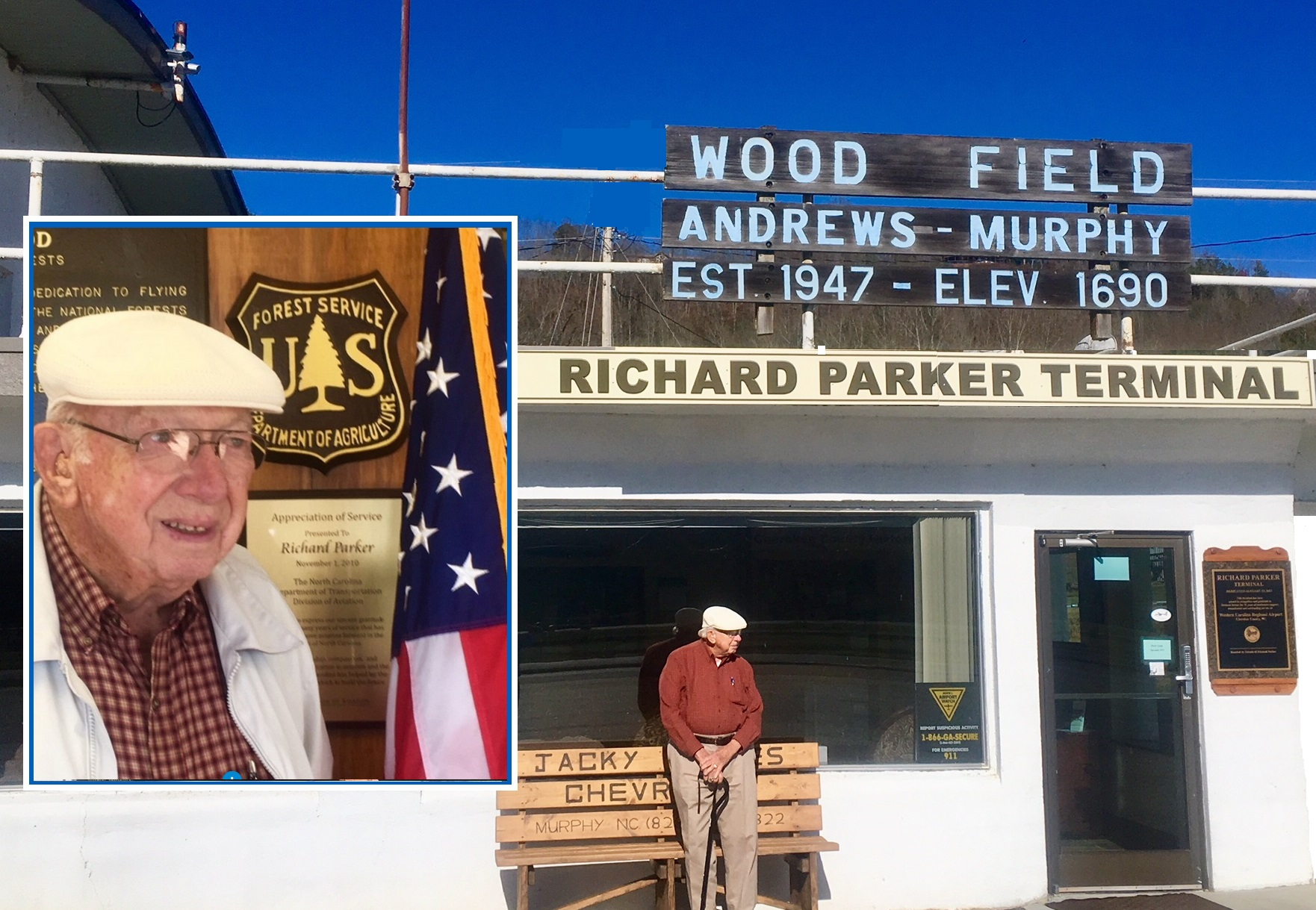
Richard Parker Airport Terminal

Western Carolina Regional Airport has been used as a strategic hub in times of disaster. In 2024, it was the closest operating airport after Hurricane Helene ravaged the Asheville area. When forest fires have broken out in the region, the airport hosts water-carrying aircraft for fire control. As of 2026, the medical helicopter for Cherokee, Clay, and Graham counties is located at the airport.

== Facilities and aircraft ==
Western Carolina Regional Airport covers an area of 206 acres (83 ha) at an elevation of 1,697 feet (517 m) above mean sea level. It has one runway designated 8/26 with an asphalt surface measuring 5,500 by 100 feet (1,676 x 30 m).

For the 12-month period ending May 24, 2020, the airport had 20,500 aircraft operations, an average of 56 per day: 92% general aviation, 5% air taxi, and 2% military. At that time there were 43 aircraft based at this airport: 37 single-engine, 4 multi-engine and 1 helicopter.

There have been discussions about constructing a new terminal at the airport since at least 2014. In 2025, the airport announced plans to build a new hangar after the completion of a new terminal.

== Airport services ==
The KRHP service features tie-down and hangar space as well as fuel and service: 100LL, JET-A, JET-A1+.

Companies that regularly use the airport include NetJets, Snap-On, and Moog Inc. Tennessee Valley Authority and the United States Department of Agriculture utilize the airport for various needs as of 2026. The U.S. Air Force visits the airport every year during training exercises. As of 2026, flying lessons are offered at the airport by multiple companies.

Chris Williams has been the airport’s manager since March 2023. Maria Hass serves as airport director as of 2025.

== Incidents ==
- On May 3, 1948, two U.S. Navy veterans working as N.C. Highway Patrolmen were killed when the Ryan PT-22 Recruit trainer plane they were flying went into a spin 100 feet off the ground during takeoff and nosedived into the earth.
- In November 2000, a plane with faulty landing gear landed on its belly at the airport. No one was injured.
- On October 3, 2021, a 1965 Beechcraft Bonanza crashed into a mountain east of the airport moments after takeoff in low visibility. The only occupants, a married couple from Texas, died at the scene.
- On April 15, 2023, a Velocity, Inc. kit aircraft crashed into trees a mile after takeoff. The pilot, an elite U.S. Army helicopter pilot, was killed. Mechanical failure was to blame.
- On June 30, 2023, a Gulfstream IV carrying comedian Gabriel Iglesias to Harrah's Cherokee Valley River casino overshot the runway in severe weather and landed in mud. The airport closed for six hours. There were no injuries.

== See also ==
- List of airports in North Carolina
