= U.S. Route 270 (Georgia–North Carolina) =

Former proposed highway in the U.S. states of Georgia and North Carolina

U.S. Route 270

Route information
- Auxiliary route of US 70
- Length: 231 mi (372 km)
- Existed: 1925–1927

Major junctions
- West end: US 29 / SR 8 / SR 13 in Lawrenceville, GA
- US 129 / SR 11 in Gainesville, GA; SR 13 in Gainesville, GA; NC 10 from near Murphy, NC to Asheville, NC
- East end: US 25 / US 70 / NC 10 / NC 20 / NC 29 in Asheville, NC

Location
- Country: United States
- States: Georgia, North Carolina
- Counties: GA: Gwinnett, Hall, White, Lumpkin, Union; NC: Cherokee, Macon, Swain, Jackson, Haywood, Buncombe

Highway system
- United States Numbered Highway System; List; Special; Divided
← SR 269	GA	→ SR 270
← NC 268	NC	→ NC 271

U.S. Route 270 (US 270) was a proposed U.S. Highway that was planned for the northern part of Georgia and the western part of North Carolina. Its western terminus was to be at US 29/Georgia State Route 8 (SR 8) and SR 13 in Lawrenceville; while its eastern terminus was slated to be at US 25/US 70/North Carolina Highway 10/North Carolina Highway 20/North Carolina Highway 29 (US 25/US 70/NC 10/NC 20/NC 29) in Asheville. US 270 was to travel concurrently with SR 13 from Lawrenceville to Gainesville; SR 11 from Gainesville to the North Carolina state line, north-northwest of Blairsville; and NC 10 for its entire length in North Carolina. The highway was proposed in 1925 and canceled in 1927. It was replaced by SR 13, US 19, SR 11, and NC 10.

== Route description ==
=== Georgia ===
US 270 was planned to begin at an intersection with US 29/SR 8 and SR 13 in Lawrenceville. It proceeded north-northwest to Buford, concurrently with SR 13. There, they were to meet the southern terminus of SR 68. US 270/SR 13 headed northeast to Gainesville. There, they met SR 11 and the northern terminus of US 129. Here, SR 11 joined the concurrency. Almost immediately afterward, SR 13 split off to the northeast, while US 270/SR 11 headed to the north-northeast. In Clermont, they met the southern terminus of SR 43. In Cleveland, the highways curved to the west-northwest, to an intersection with the northern terminus of SR 9. They headed to the north-northwest and curved to the northwest. In Blairsville, they met SR 2. They curved back to the north-northeast and reached the North Carolina state line. Here, SR 11 ended, and US 270 began a concurrency with NC 10.

=== North Carolina ===
US 270 and NC 10 traveled north through Belview and curved to the north-northeast. In Murphy, they intersected NC 28. They curved to the northeast, traveling through Tomotla, Marble, and Andrews. There, they headed to the east-southeast to Valleytown. They headed northeast again, through Rhode, and entered Topton. There, they intersected the southern terminus of NC 108. After traveling through Nantahala, Wesser, and Almond, they met the northern terminus of NC 286. East-northeast of there, the highways traveled through Bryson City. Just northwest of Whittier, US 270 and NC 10 met the southern terminus of NC 107. They curved to the southeast, traveling through Whittier and Wilmot, before entering Dillsboro. There, they met the northern terminus of NC 285. Heading to the east-northeast, they met the northern terminus of NC 106 in Sylva. They traveled through Beta, Addie, Balsam, and Hazelwood, before entering Waynesville. There, they intersected NC 284. Just northeast of the city, they met the southern terminus of NC 209. They headed to the east-southeast, traveling through Clyde and Canton. They curved to the east-northeast, traveling through Turnpike, Luther, and Candler. Just before entering Asheville, they curved back to the east-southeast. In Asheville, US 270 reached its eastern terminus, an intersection with US 25/US 70/NC 10/NC 20/NC 29.

== History ==
US 270 was proposed in 1925. In 1927, it was canceled. It was replaced by US 19 from Lawrenceville to Andrews and from Dillsboro to Asheville, SR 13 from Lawrenceville to Gainesville, SR 11 from Gainesville to the North Carolina state line, and NC 10 from the state line to Asheville.

The US 270 corridor now consists of SR 20 from Lawrenceville to the Buford area, SR 124 in Lawrenceville, US 23 from Buford to Gainesville, SR 13 from the Sugar Hill–Buford line to Gainesville, SR 11 Bus. in Gainesville, SR 11 from Gainesville to the North Carolina state line, US 129 from Gainesville to Topton, US 19 from northwest of Cleveland to southwest of Bryson City, SR 75 Alt. in the Cleveland area, SR 180 south-southeast of Blairsville, US 76/SR 2/SR 515 in the Blairsville area, US 64 from Ranger to Murphy, US 74 from Ranger to Asheville, NC 28 from Almond to Lauada, US 441 in the Dillsboro area, US 23 from Dillsboro to Asheville, US 276 from Dellwood to Lake Junaluska, and NC 215 in Canton. The current path is approximately 213 miles (343 km)

== Major intersections ==
State	County	Location	mi	km	Destinations	Notes
Georgia	Gwinnett	Lawrenceville	0.0	0.0	US 29 / SR 8 / SR 13 south	Western end of SR 13 concurrency; western terminus; SR 13 is now part of SR 20/SR 124.
Georgia	Gwinnett	Buford	13.5	21.7	SR 68 north	Southern terminus of SR 68; now part of SR 20
Georgia	Hall	Gainesville	32.1	51.7	US 129 south / SR 11 south	Western end of SR 11 concurrency; northern terminus of US 129; US 129/SR 11 is now part of SR 11 Bus.
Georgia	Hall	Gainesville	32.1	51.7	SR 13 north	Eastern end of SR 13 concurrency; now also part of US 23
Georgia	Hall	Clermont	43.6	70.2	SR 43 north	Southern terminus of SR 43; now part of SR 52
Georgia	White	No major junctions				
Georgia	Lumpkin		68.7	110.6	SR 9 south	Northern terminus of SR 9; now also part of US 19
Georgia	Union	Blairsville	89.3	143.7	SR 2	
Georgia–North Carolina state line			100.4 0	161.6 0.0	Eastern end of SR 11 concurrency; western end of NC 10 concurrency; northern terminus of SR 11; western terminus of NC 10	
North Carolina	Cherokee	Murphy	8	13	NC 28 east	Western terminus of NC 28
North Carolina	Cherokee	Topton	36	58	NC 108 north	Southern terminus of NC 108; now part of US 129
North Carolina	Swain	Lauada	55	89	NC 286 south	Northern terminus of NC 286; now part of NC 28
North Carolina	Jackson		66	106	NC 107 north	Southern terminus of NC 107
North Carolina	Jackson	Dillsboro	77	124	NC 285 south	Northern terminus of NC 285; now part of US 23/US 441
North Carolina	Jackson	Sylva	78	126	NC 106 south	Northern terminus of NC 106; now part of NC 107
North Carolina	Haywood	Waynesville	96	154	NC 284	Now part of US 276
North Carolina	Haywood		105	169	NC 209 north	Southern terminus of NC 209
North Carolina	Buncombe	Asheville	131	211	US 25 / US 70 / NC 10 east / NC 20 / NC 29	Eastern terminus; eastern end of NC 10 concurrency
1.000 mi = 1.609 km; 1.000 km = 0.621 mi: Concurrency terminus
