= Murphy Branch =

Railway line in the United States

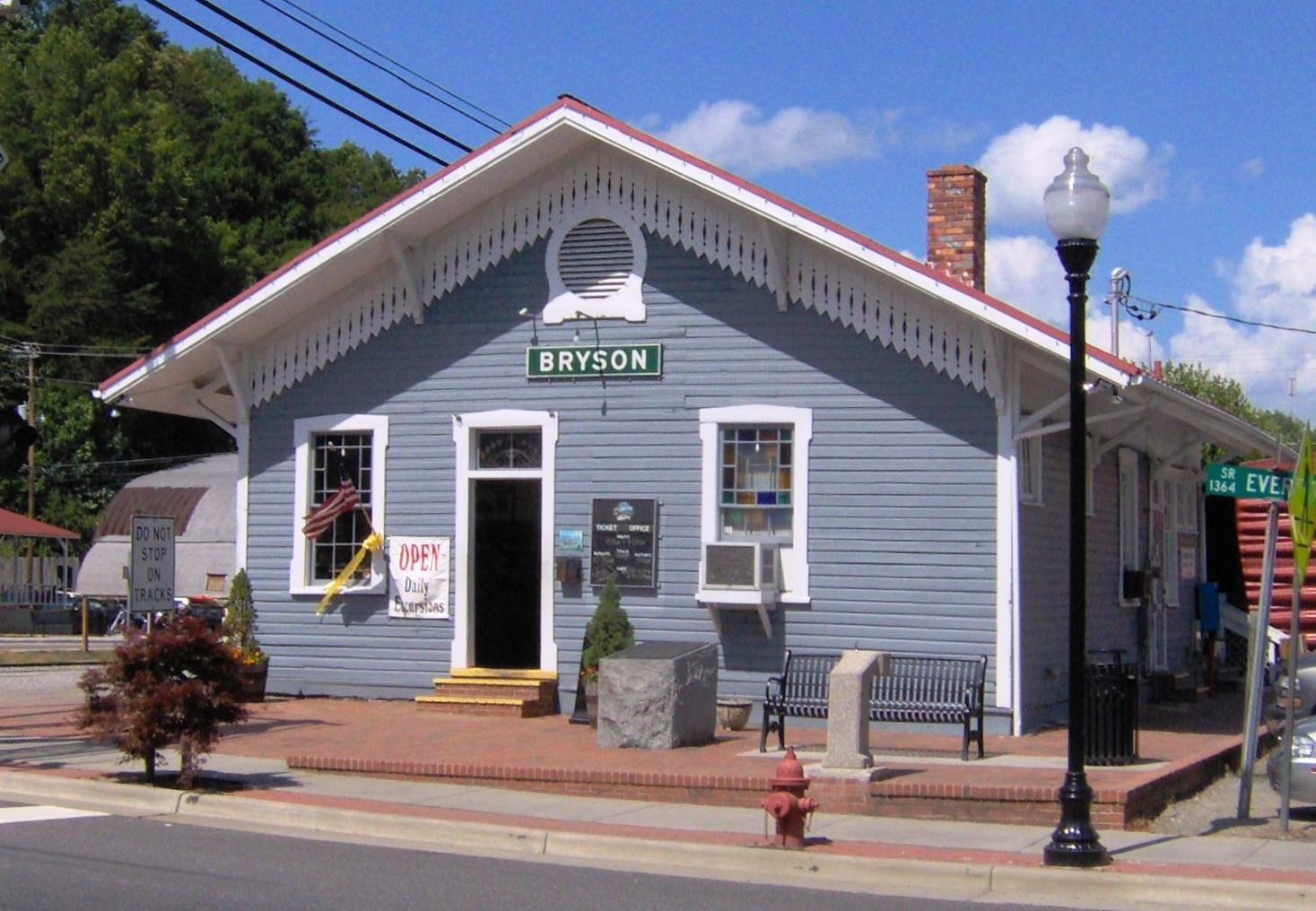
A former Southern Railway depot in Bryson City, North Carolina, now serving as the main headquarters of the Great Smoky Mountains Railroad (GSMR)

The Murphy Branch is a branch line operated by the Western North Carolina Railroad, later the Richmond and Danville, Southern Railway, the Norfolk Southern Railway (NS) and today it is operated by the Blue Ridge Southern Railroad and the Great Smoky Mountains Railway. Blue Ridge Southern owns the Asheville to Sylva segment and Great Smoky Mountains Railway owns the Sylva to Nantahala section. The branch runs between Asheville, North Carolina in the east and Murphy in the west.

I-40 from Asheville to Canton and US Route 74, also known as the Great Smoky Mountains Expressway, from Canton to Murphy, roughly parallel the railway. Grades on the Murphy Branch exceed 4.0% in two places.

== History ==
It was constructed with convict lease labor between 1880 and 1891 under the charter of the Western North Carolina Railroad. The Murphy Branch was important to the development of southwestern North Carolina in the late 19th and early 20th centuries. It opened up the isolated and rural mountains west of Asheville to the outside world, allowing easy travel and improved commerce. These tracks stimulated the development of Western North Carolina.

In the 1980s, Norfolk Southern decided to close the Murphy Branch west of Sylva because of declining freight traffic. The NCDOT purchased the branch west of Dillsboro in 1988, the first purchase under NCDOT's program to preserve rail corridors. It granted trackage rights between Dillsboro and Andrews to the Great Smoky Mountains Railroad (GSMR), a tourist excursion railroad that also provides freight service. In 1996, the NCDOT sold the Dillsboro-Andrews portion of the Murphy Branch to the GSMR.

In April 2014, Norfolk Southern announced that it would be selling the Asheville-Dillsboro leg of the Murphy Branch to Watco, a short-line railroad headquartered in Pittsburg, Kansas. A new North Carolina Limited Liability Company was established and named the Blue Ridge Southern Railroad to manage this. The deal closed and operations began on 26 July 2014.

The GSMR continues to own the Dillsboro to Andrews leg and operates all but the westernmost portion between Hewitt and Andrews. The NCDOT continues to own the tracks between Andrews and Murphy; this section has been out of service continuously since 1985. The next year CSX abandoned and removed its connecting line in 1986 from Murphy southwestward into Georgia, formerly a line of the Louisville and Nashville.

== Locomotive roster ==
=== Southern Railway ===
==== Ks, Ks-1, and Ks-2 classes ====
During the 1900s, the Southern Railway (SOU) employed many of their Ks class 2-8-0 "Consolidation" type steam locomotives to primarily haul freight trains on the Murphy Branch until the 1950s when their duties were taken over by SOU's new fleet of EMD F7 and GP7 diesels. Only two of them, Nos. 630 and 722, were preserved. In the 1960s until Norfolk Southern sold the line in 1985, EMD GP30, GP38, GP38-2 locomotives and GE U23B and B23-7 (both in the late 60s and late 70s respectively) locomotives could all be found on this line. Because of tunnel clearances, nothing greater than 4 axles was permitted on this line.

Ks, Ks-1, and Ks-2 steam locomotive details
Road number	Class	Builder	Serial number	Built	Driver diameter	Retired	Note
573	Ks-2 (formerly K)	ALCO's Richmond Works	39290	1906	57 in (1.448 m)	January 1950	Built with Stephenson valve gear and 22 in × 30 in (559 mm × 762 mm) cylinders. Re-equipped with superheaters, Southern valve gear, and larger 25 in × 30 in (635 mm × 762 mm) cylinders in the 1910s-20s.
586	Ks-2 (formerly K)	ALCO's Richmond Works	39303	1906	57 in (1.448 m)	?	Built with Stephenson valve gear and 22 in × 30 in (559 mm × 762 mm) cylinders. Re-equipped with superheaters, Southern valve gear, and larger 25 in × 30 in (635 mm × 762 mm) cylinders in the 1910s-20s.
599	Ks (formerly K)	ALCO's Richmond Works	39316	1906	57 in (1.448 m)	?	Built with Walschaerts valve gear and 22 in × 30 in (559 mm × 762 mm) cylinders and retained them. Re-equipped with superheaters in the 1910s.
630	Ks-1 (formerly K)	ALCO's Richmond Works	28446	1904	56 in (1.422 m)	June 6, 1952	Built with Stephenson valve gear and 22 in × 30 in (559 mm × 762 mm) cylinders. Re-equipped with superheaters, Southern valve gear, and larger 24 in × 30 in (610 mm × 762 mm) cylinders in 1917.
651	Ks-2 (formerly K)	ALCO's Pittsburgh Works	28941	1904	56 in (1.422 m)	?	Built with Stephenson valve gear and 22 in × 30 in (559 mm × 762 mm) cylinders. Re-equipped with superheaters, Walschaerts valve gear, and larger 25 in × 30 in (635 mm × 762 mm) cylinders in the 1910s-20s.
685	Ks-1 (formerly K)	Baldwin Locomotive Works	?	1904	56 in (1.422 m)	?	Built with Stephenson valve gear and 22 in × 30 in (559 mm × 762 mm) cylinders. Re-equipped with superheaters, Southern valve gear, and larger 24 in × 30 in (610 mm × 762 mm) cylinders in the 1910s-20s.
695	Ks-2 (formerly K)	Baldwin Locomotive Works	?	1904	56 in (1.422 m)	?	Built with Stephenson valve gear and 22 in × 30 in (559 mm × 762 mm) cylinders. Re-equipped with superheaters, Southern valve gear, and larger 25 in × 30 in (635 mm × 762 mm) cylinders in the 1910s-20s.
698	Ks-2 (formerly K)	ALCO's Richmond Works	29883	1904	56 in (1.422 m)	?	Built with Stephenson valve gear and 22 in × 30 in (559 mm × 762 mm) cylinders. Re-equipped with superheaters, Southern valve gear, and larger 25 in × 30 in (635 mm × 762 mm) cylinders in the 1910s-20s.
711	Ks-2 (formerly K)	ALCO's Richmond Works	29896	1904	56 in (1.422 m)	?	Built with Stephenson valve gear and 22 in × 30 in (559 mm × 762 mm) cylinders. Re-equipped with superheaters, Southern valve gear, and larger 25 in × 30 in (635 mm × 762 mm) cylinders in the 1910s-20s.
712	Ks-1 (formerly K)	ALCO's Richmond Works	29897	1904	56 in (1.422 m)	February 23, 1950	Built with Stephenson valve gear and 22 in × 30 in (559 mm × 762 mm) cylinders. Re-equipped with superheaters, Southern valve gear, and larger 24 in × 30 in (610 mm × 762 mm) cylinders in the 1910s-20s.
722	Ks-1 (formerly K)	Baldwin Locomotive Works	24729	1904	56 in (1.422 m)	August 1952	Built with Walschaerts valve gear and 22 in × 30 in (559 mm × 762 mm) cylinders. Re-equipped with superheaters, Southern valve gear, and larger 24 in × 30 in (610 mm × 762 mm) cylinders in the 1910s-20s.
735	Ks-2 (formerly K)	ALCO's Richmond Works	37626	1905	57 in (1.448 m)	?	Built with Stephenson valve gear and 22 in × 30 in (559 mm × 762 mm) cylinders. Re-equipped with superheaters, Southern valve gear, and larger 25 in × 30 in (635 mm × 762 mm) cylinders in the 1910s-20s.
848	Ks-1 (formerly K)	Baldwin Locomotive Works	?	1906	57 in (1.448 m)	?	Built with Stephenson valve gear and 22 in × 30 in (559 mm × 762 mm) cylinders. Re-equipped with superheaters, Southern valve gear, and larger 24 in × 30 in (610 mm × 762 mm) cylinders in the 1910s-20s.
857	Ks-1 (formerly K)	Baldwin Locomotive Works	?	1906	57 in (1.448 m)	?	Built with Stephenson valve gear and 22 in × 30 in (559 mm × 762 mm) cylinders. Re-equipped with superheaters, Walschaerts valve gear, and larger 24 in × 30 in (610 mm × 762 mm) cylinders in the 1910s-20s.
871	Ks-1 (formerly K)	Baldwin Locomotive Works	?	1906	57 in (1.448 m)	?	Built with Stephenson valve gear and 22 in × 30 in (559 mm × 762 mm) cylinders. Re-equipped with superheaters, Southern valve gear, and larger 24 in × 30 in (610 mm × 762 mm) cylinders in the 1910s-20s.

== Towns, cities and communities along the route ==
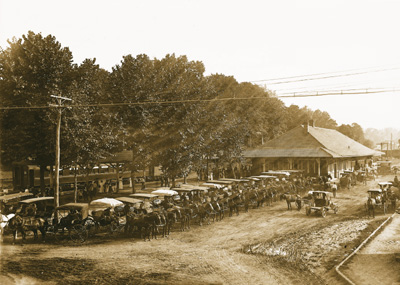
The Waynesville Train Depot sometime in the 1890s

- Asheville MP 0 (Beginning point)
- Murphy Junction
- Emma
- Enka MP 7.3
- Hominy MP 8.8
- Candler
- Coburn
- Canton MP 18.1 (Champion Paper Mill, located here, was the largest customer on the Murphy Branch. It had its own switcher.)
- Clyde MP 22.5
- Lake Junaluska MP 25.7
- Waynesville MP 28.5
- Hazelwood MP 29.8
- Saunook
- Balsam Gap (junction of US 74 and the Blue Ridge Parkway)
- Balsam MP 36.2
- Willits-Ochre Hill MP 40.1 (Referred to as just Willits in April 1944 timetable)
- Addie MP 43.0 (The Bryson Switcher would drop of loads of cars here for the through freights to pick up)
- Beta
- Sylva MP 47.3
- Dillsboro MP 48.9
- Wilmot
- Whittier MP 58.7
- Ela MP 60.9 (interchange with Appalachian Railway, 1907-1935,)
- Bryson City (Bryson City Depot) MP 65.3, (railroaders referred to it as just Bryson)
- Almond MP 77.3
- Wesser (The section between Bryson and Wesser was relocated during the Fontana Dam construction during WW2)
- Hewitt
- Nantahala MP 87.3 (end point today for the GSMR)
- Topton MP 91.4 (near the junction with the former Graham County Railroad,)
- Graham County Railroad interchange MP 97.1
- Andrews MP 100.2 (end point of the GSMR until 2010)
- Marble MP 106.0
- Murphy MP 115.3 (end point of the GSMR until 1995)

== Commodities shipped/received ==
The Murphy Branch still plays a vital role in the industrial economy of western North Carolina. The rail line serves Jackson Paper Manufacturing Company in Sylva and 70 percent of its business came from the Pactiv Evergreen paper mill in Canton which closed in 2023, forcing the railroad to make cutbacks. Chemicals used in the making of epsom salt are delivered to Premier Magnesia (formerly Giles Chemical) in Waynesville, and the paper mill's closure led to the largest epsom salt supplier in the Americas getting help from Haywood County to deal with the rail service cutbacks and prevent the company from leaving after 70 years. There are several small concrete mixing facilities that receive sand. Woodchips are loaded at T&S Hardwoods in Addie, about 4 miles east of Sylva. Liquefied petroleum gas is delivered to a transfer facility a few miles outside of Sylva in the community of Beta.

== In media ==
In 2023, a railroad simulator/management video game entitled Railroader entered early access on Steam. The game depicts the route from Sylva to Andrews, which the player owns and operates as a shortline railroad set in the 1940s-1950s.

== See also ==
- Blue Ridge Southern Railroad
- Great Smoky Mountains Railroad

== Bibliography ==
- Plott, Jacob; Plott, Bob (2021). Smoky Mountain Railways (1st ed.). The History Press. ISBN 978-1-4671-4459-9.
