= Balsam Gap =

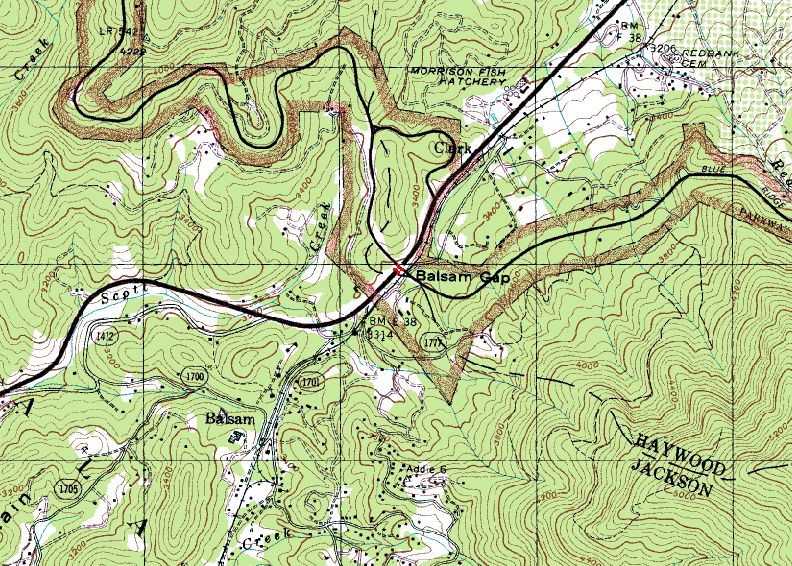
- USGS Map of Balsam Gap

- Location within North Carolina
- Elevation: 3,316 feet (1,011 m)
- Traversed by: US 23 / US 74; Blue Ridge Parkway

Third Approach
- Location: North Carolina; United States
- Range: Great Balsam Mountains
- Coordinates: 35°26′02″N 83°04′40″W
- Topo map: USGS Hazelwood

Balsam Gap (el. 3,316 ft (1,011 m)) is a mountain pass between the Plott Balsam Range to the northwest and the Great Balsam Mountains to the southeast on the county line dividing Haywood and Jackson counties in the U.S. state of North Carolina.

The gap allows both the Great Smoky Mountains Expressway and the former Murphy Branch of the Southern Railway, now owned by Blue Ridge Southern Railroad, to cross between the two counties running east–west. The Blue Ridge Parkway also runs through the gap in a north–south direction crossing both the expressway and railway branch.

The gap is named for the Great Balsam Mountains in which it lies. The small, unincorporated communities of Balsam in Jackson County and Saunook in Haywood County are also located close by.
