= Willets, North Carolina =

- Unincorporated community
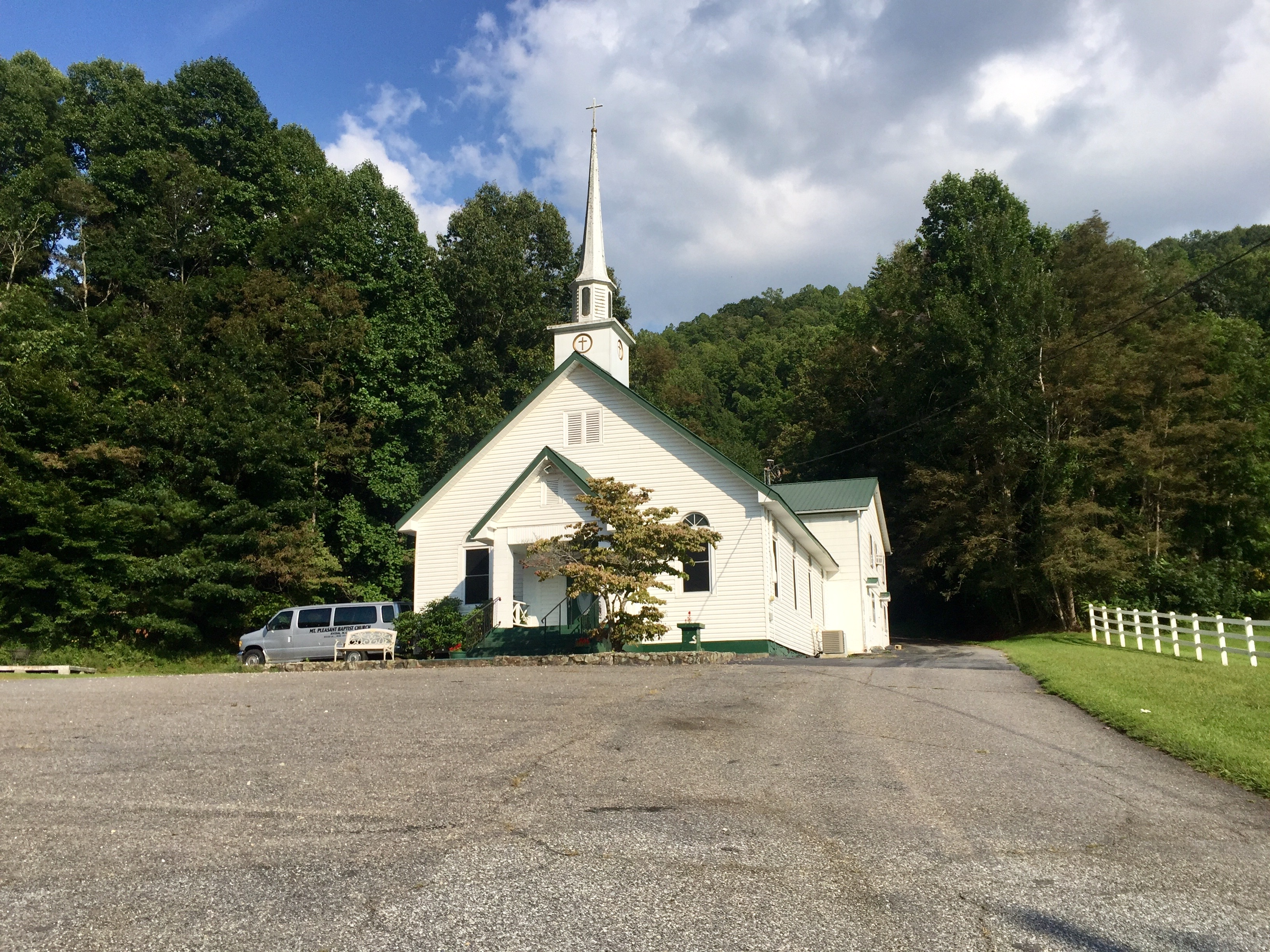
- Mount Pleasant Baptist Church, located at Willets

- Location within North Carolina Location within the United States
- Coordinates: 35°24′42″N 83°06′56″W
- Country: United States
- State: North Carolina
- County: Jackson
- Elevation: 2,690 ft (820 m)
- Time zone: UTC-5 (Eastern (EST))
  - Summer (DST): UTC-4 (EDT)
- Area code: 828
- GNIS feature ID: 996296

Willets is an unincorporated community in Jackson County, North Carolina, United States. Willets is located along U.S. Route 74, west of Balsam and east of Sylva. It is home to the Balsam-Willets-Ochre Hill fire department, a church, and many homes. It was a thriving unincorporated town along the Murphy Branch of the Western North Carolina Railroad, but seriously declined during the Great Depression in the 1930s, consolidations of the schools in the Scott Creek Township in 1951, and the widening/straightening of US 23 in the early 1950s and early 1970s. Today it is a tiny bedroom community for the larger population centers of Waynesville and Sylva.

== History ==
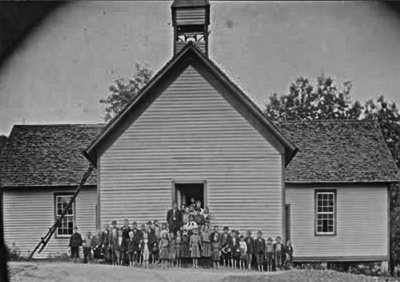
The old Willets Graded School in 1909

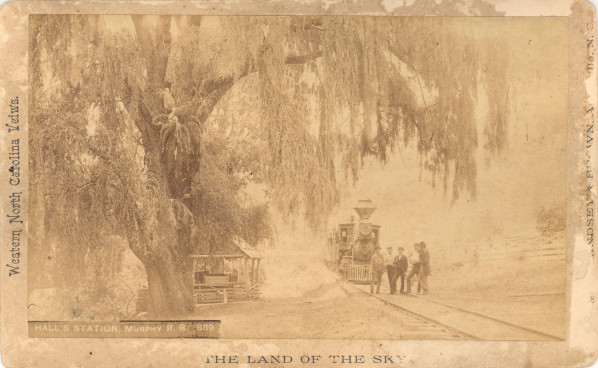
The Willets Depot in the 1890s, when it was known as Hall's Station/Hall's Siding.

A post office called Willets was established in 1903, and remained in operation until 1934. The community was named for A. P. Willets, the owner of a local sawmill.
