= Nantahala, North Carolina =

Township in Macon County, North Carolina

Coordinates: 35°17′17″N 83°40′00″W

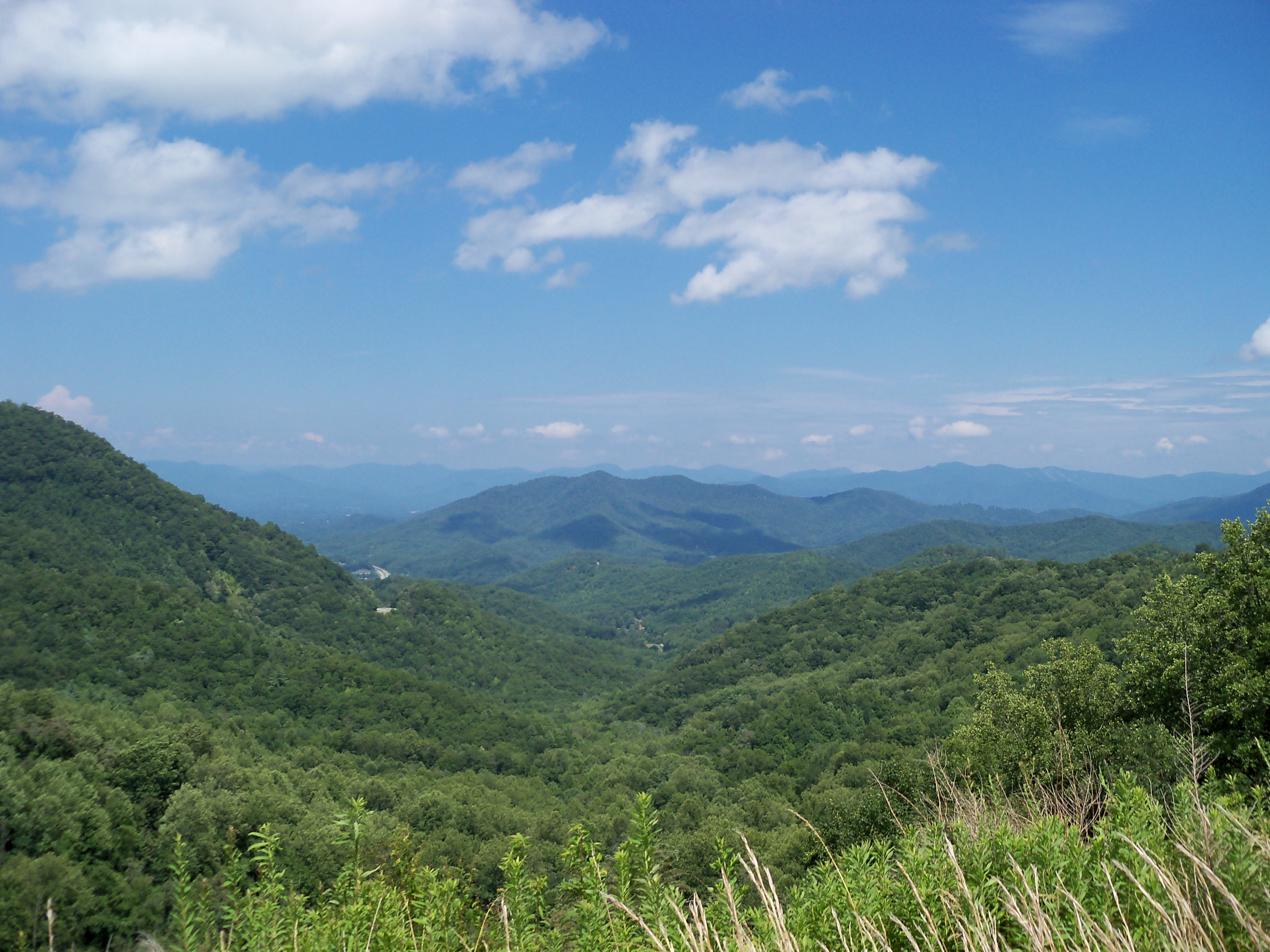
View from US highway 64 just west of Franklin. Part of the Nantahala National Forest in the Appalachian Mountains.

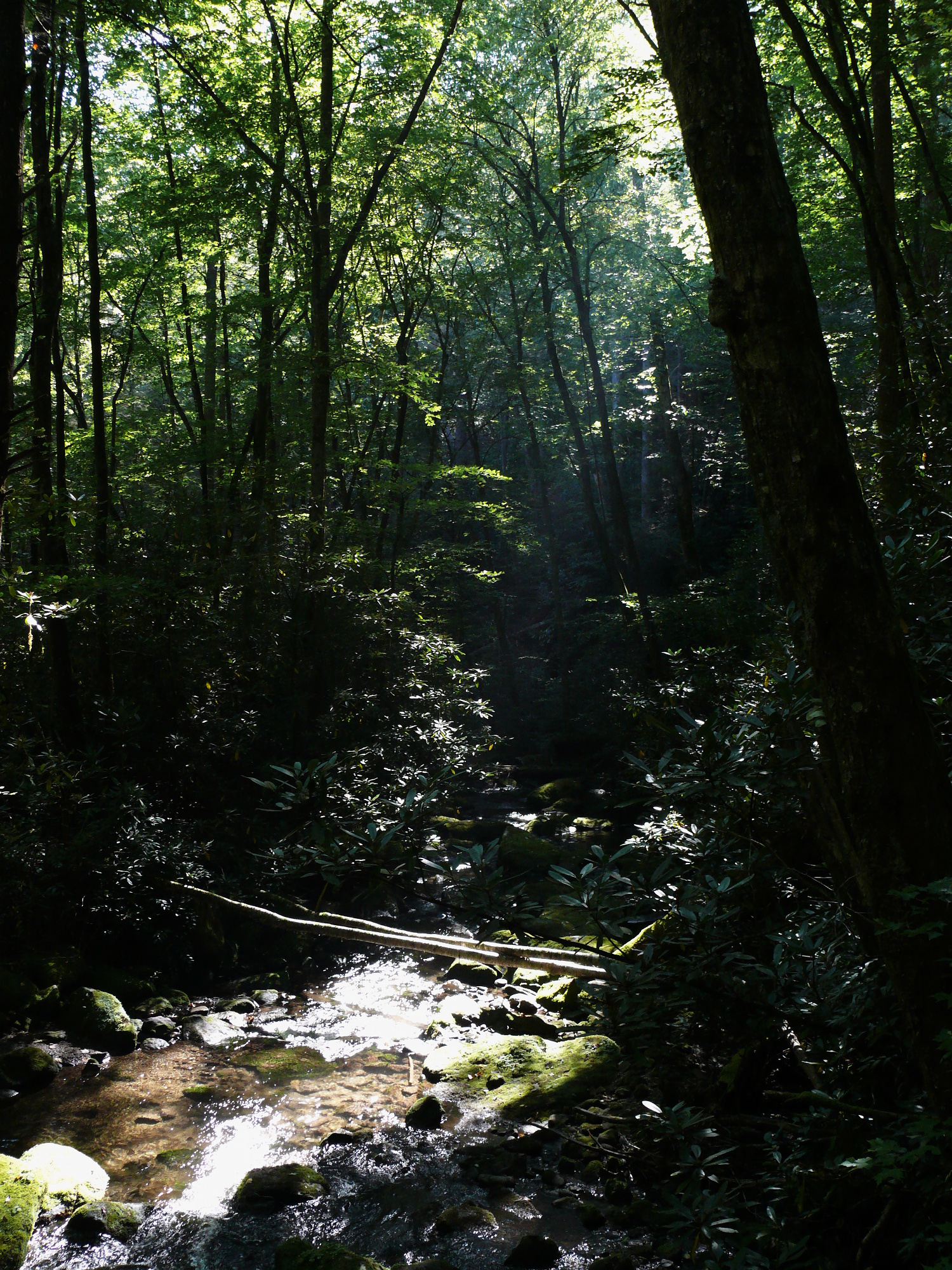
Sunlight penetrates the dense forest canopy over Little Santeetlah Creek in the Joyce Kilmer Memorial Forest.

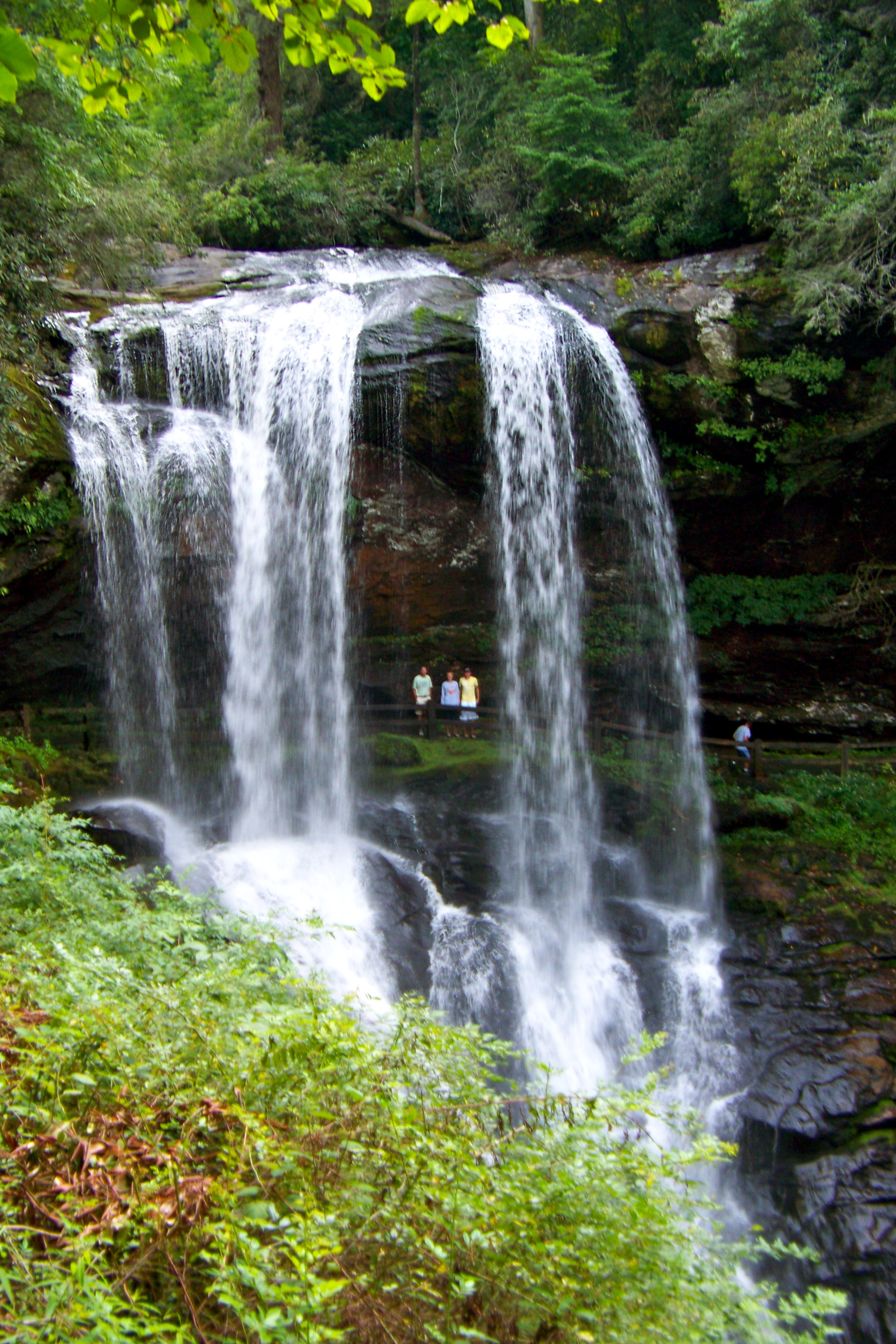
Dry Falls

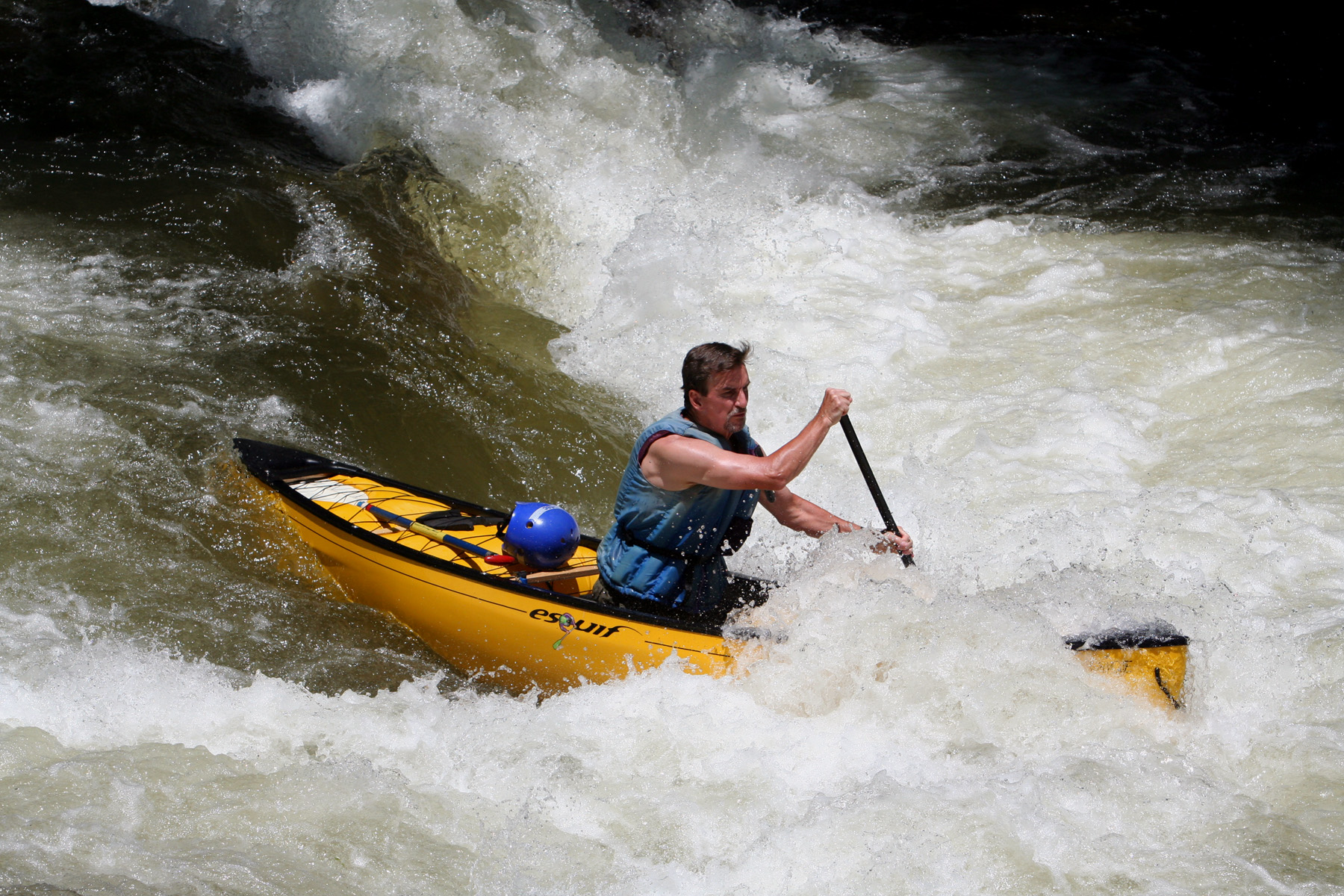
Nantahala River canoeist 2009

Nantahala Township (/ˌnæntəˈheɪlə/) is located in North Carolina, United States in the part of Macon County which is west of Wayah Gap. It has a population of 1,711.

Nantahala (also written "Nun'daye'li" or "Nuntialy") was a Cherokee Valley Town whose name typically translated as "The sun between them", from the Cherokee ᏅᏓ (nvda, "sun") and ᎠᏰᎵ (a-ye-li, "middle"). Another translation is "land of the noonday sun", referring to the depth of the gorge. The Nantahala valley was an important crossroads in the heart of Cherokee country, connecting the Valley Towns to the south and the Middle and Out Towns to the north. Upstream, the town of Aquone takes it name from the Cherokee egwanul'ti, meaning "by the river". Historic Cherokee settlements likely extended throughout the Nantahala river valley, including land now covered by Nantahala Lake. The Nantahala valley was supposedly visited by the Spanish Conquistador Hernando de Soto in 1540, and by the English botanist William Bartram in the 18th century. "Nuntialla" appears on [Thomas Mante|Thomas Mante's] 1772 map, "A sketch of Cherokee Country.

Nantahala receives a majority of its revenue from tourism.

== Nantahala National Forest ==
The Nantahala National Forest was established in 1920 under the authority of the 1911 Weeks Act and is now an assorted collection of noncontiguous protected land. The 1911 Weeks Act provided authority to acquire lands for national forests to protect watersheds, to provide timber, and to regulate the flow of maneuverable streams. It is the largest of four forests in North Carolina. This forest consists of 100 different species of trees. The forest covers 531,148 acres with elevations ranging from 5,800 feet in Jackson County to 1,200 feet in Cherokee County covering much of the western tip of the state. The Nantahala forest is divided into three districts: Cheoah in Robbinsville, Tusquitee in Murphy, and the Nantahala in Franklin. A part of the Appalachian Trail is in this forest where many people hike.

== Nantahala River ==
The Nantahala River is located at the end of the Nantahala National Forest. U.S. Route 19 runs alongside the river's course. People use the river for many outdoor activities, including whitewater rafting, kayaking, and fishing.

== Whitewater rafting and kayaking ==
The white water rafting here consists of class I, II and III rapids at different parts of the river. Class I is considered easy and smooth, with occasional sand banks, and has gentle curves. The most difficult problems might arise when paddling around bridges and other obvious obstructions. Class II is considered moderate. It has medium-quick water and rapids, regular waves, and open passages between rocks. Knowledge of how to maneuver a raft is required and tour guides are recommended for beginners. Class III is moderately difficult. It has numerous high and uneven waves with rocks and whirls. The passages are clear but narrow and require experience to raft down. Visual inspection is required if rapids are not well known. The class III rapids are located at the end of river for 30 seconds. The Nantahala River is located at the end of the Nantahala National Forest. The white water rafting trip consisted of eight miles of clear water that takes about 3 to 4 hours. The tours were fully guided by professional white water rafters who are trained first aid. The river is dam-controlled river, good water flow at any time of the year. Kayaking also occurs as a recreational sport down this river. A popular form of kayaking in this region is called duckys, or an inflatable kayak to make it easier to go down the river and back up quickly. The duckys are suggested for experienced river rafters who are looking for a more high-performance trip down the river.

== Fishing ==
The Nantahala River contains mostly stream-bred trout. Fishing in this river requires some wading skill and care.

=== Nantahala Lake ===
Nantahala Lake is found in the Nantahala National Forest at 3000 feet above sea level. It was created in 1942 by Nantahala Power to provide electricity for the war efforts. The historic Indian village, Aquone was located where the lake is now. Nantahala Lake is controlled and maintained by Duke Power Company. Some of the shoreline is owned by the general public and run by the Nantahala National Forest and NCWRC. The NCWRC also maintains the public boating access area. Of the 6,000 plus fish there are walleye, lake trout, brown trout, bluegill, crappie, small mouth and large mouth bass.

=== Nantahala Gorge ===
The Nantahala Gorge divides Graham County to the northwest and Macon County and Swain County to the southeast. The Gorge consists of nine miles of the Nantahala River and ending at Fontana Lake. The gorge is also the only part of the Nantahala River and the only trout water in North Carolina that permits night fishing. The Nantahala Gorge provides the state of North Carolina with its first canopy tour. The Nantahala Gorge Canopy Tours opened July, 2009 and is the first zipline/canopy tour facility in the area. The attraction is a three-hour or half a mile (20 acres) experience that simulates flying and is naturally fueled by gravity with a gradual 3 percent elevation change. A canopy ranger will point out the forest's natural features and will also inform people with the cultural and history of the gorge.

=== Nantahala Outdoor Center ===
The Nantahala Outdoor Center was founded in 1972 in Bryson City, North Carolina. The center is known for offering guided trips of kayaking, canoeing, and rafting trips. A man named John Burton started working at the Nantahala Outdoor Center when it first opened and soon became president of the center. He also competed in the 1972 Summer Olympic games in Munich when whitewater slalom became a sport. It is now a part of a facility where the U.S. Olympic athletes in kayak and canoe events train. Other than kayaking, canoeing, and whitewater rafting, the Nantahala Outdoor Center offers a variety of other fully guided things such as: fly-fishing, hiking, nature photography, train rides, and mountain biking. The center also has a clothing store, lodging, and three restaurants.
