= Wilmot, North Carolina =

- Unincorporated community
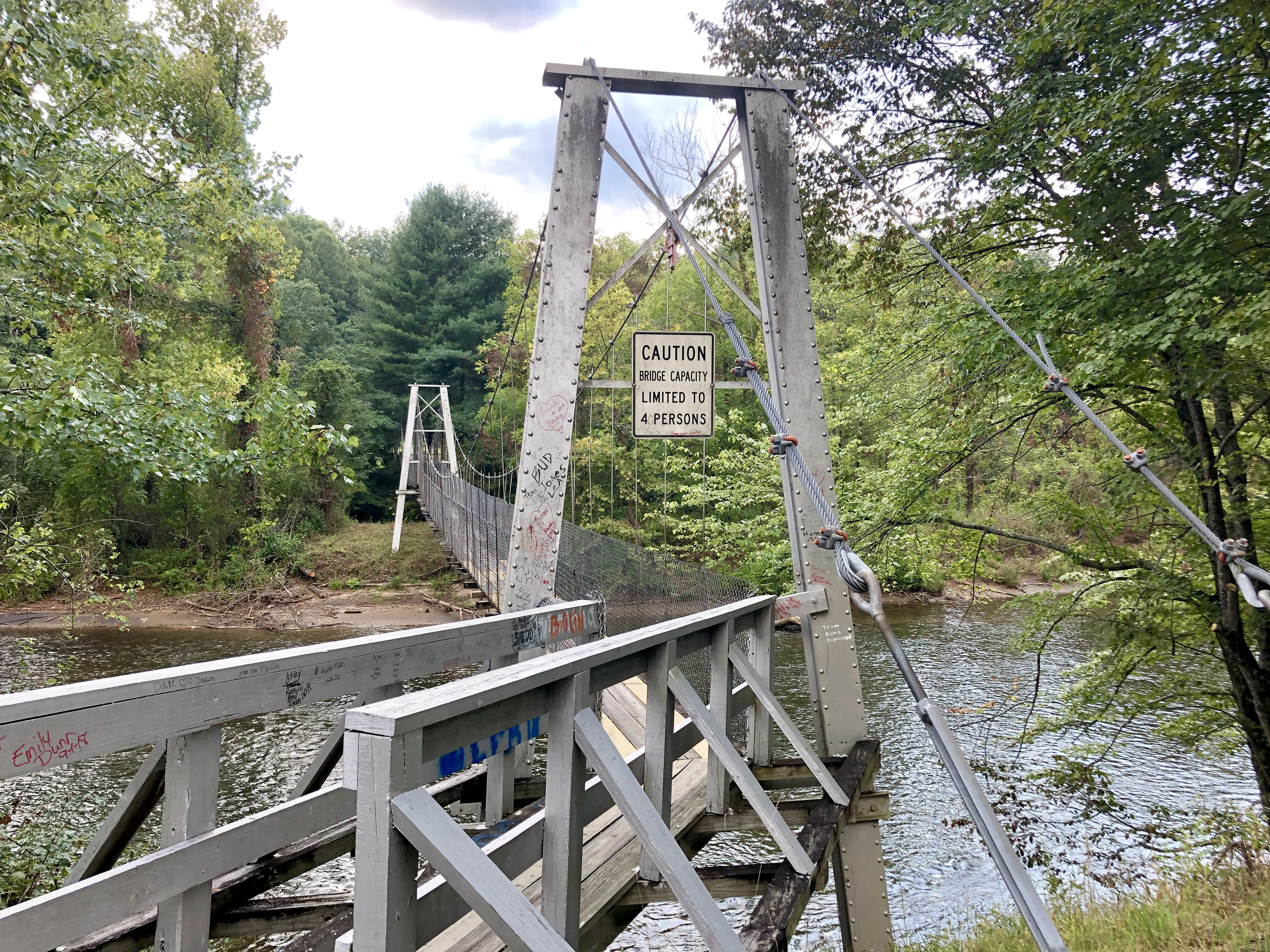
- The Wilmot Swinging Bridge

- Location within North Carolina Location within the United States
- Coordinates: 35°24′08″N 83°18′47″W
- Country: United States
- State: North Carolina
- County: Jackson
- Elevation: 1,916 ft (584 m)
- Time zone: UTC-5 (Eastern (EST))
  - Summer (DST): UTC-4 (EDT)
- Zip Code(s): 28789
- Area code: 828
- GNIS feature ID: 1023270

Wilmot is an unincorporated community in Jackson County, North Carolina, United States. Wilmot is located along U.S. Route 74, West of Dillsboro and East of Whittier.

As the Western North Carolina Railroad constructed the Murphy Branch, Wilmot served as a whistle stop and a point of access to the railroad for area logging companies.
