= Balsam Mountain Inn =

- U.S. National Register of Historic Places
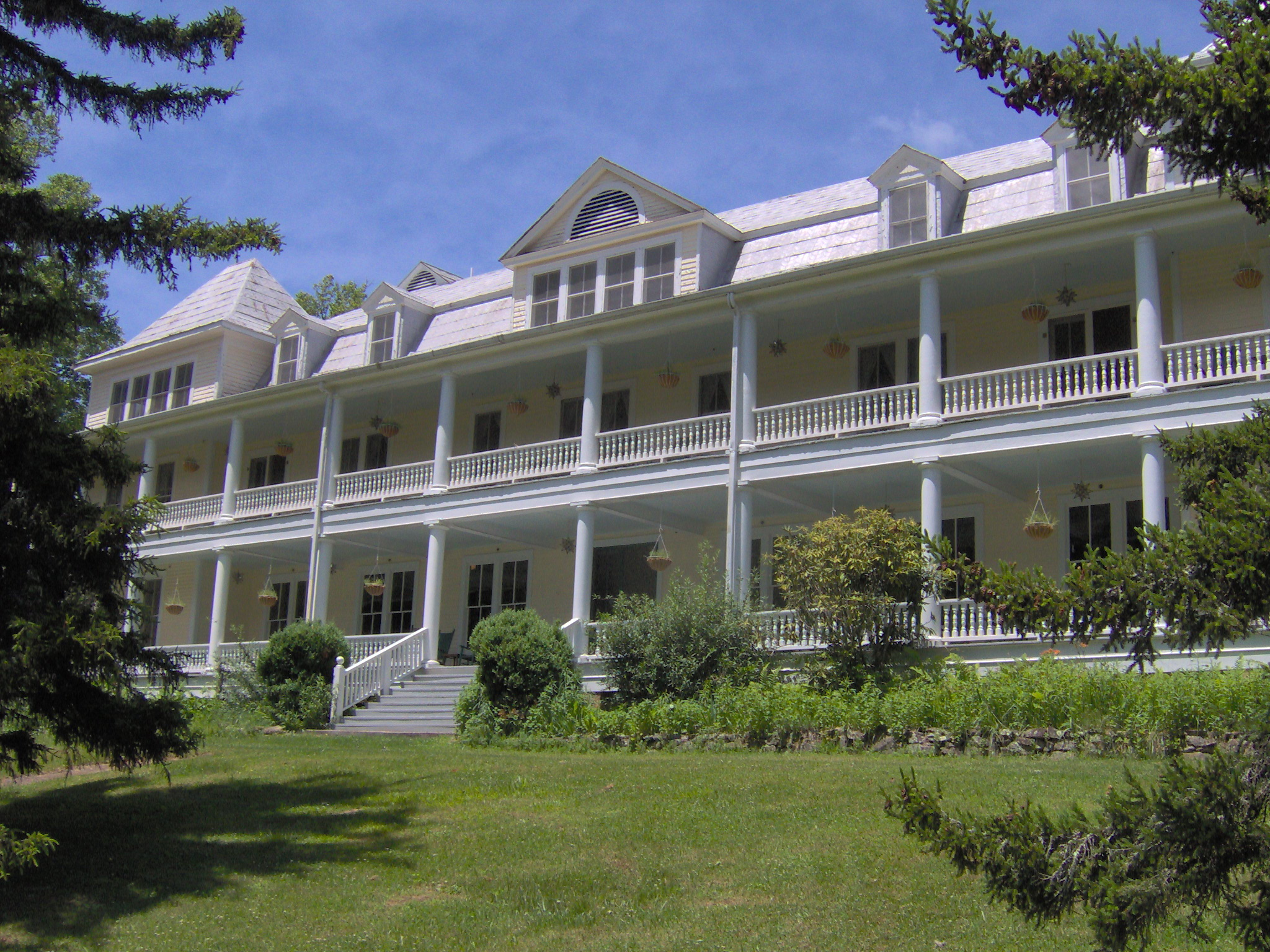

- Location within North Carolina Location within the United States
- Location: 68 Seven Springs Drive, Balsam, North Carolina
- Coordinates: 35°25′31″N 83°5′14″W
- Area: 26 acres (11 ha)
- Built: 1905-1908
- Architectural style: Colonial Revival
- NRHP reference No.: 82003475
- Added to NRHP: July 15, 1982

The Balsam Mountain Inn is a historic three-story wooden Neo-Classical and Victorian hotel located at 68 Seven Springs Drive in Balsam, North Carolina, United States. It is among the oldest remaining resorts in the North Carolina mountains and was added to the National Register of Historic Places in July 1982.

The 46,000-square foot inn includes a two-story gallery-style 100-foot-long front deck, 50 dormer windows, and a dining room and library on the first floor.

== History ==
Construction of the inn began in 1905 and was completed in 1908. It was built by brothers-in-law Walter Christy and Joseph Kenney, both from Athens, Georgia. The hotel was planned as a two-story structure, but once framing was completed, a grander appearance was desired and a third floor was built with a mansard roof. It was modeled after the Saratoga Inn in New York.

The inn opened with 125 guest bedrooms and communal bathrooms. Its original name was Balsam Mountain Springs Hotel, as the property's seven springs provided water for the establishment. Fountains inside the building allowed guests to fill up bottles with cold mineral water thought to have healing properties. Due to the elevation (3,750 feet), fires were kindled in the hotel's fireplaces on summer nights and mornings. The inn retained its original name until at least 1963. It began as a railroad resort hotel, one of many in the area when four passenger trains stopped in Balsam each day. Now, the Balsam Mountain Inn is the last one standing in Balsam. The inn's hallways were designed 10 feet wide to accommodate the large trunks railroad passengers carried with them. A stay cost $5 per day and included all meals. The inn advertised that the Balsam railroad station was the highest east of the Rocky Mountains. The resort offered tennis, golf, horseback riding, hiking, fishing, mountain climbing, and dancing.

A visitor was shot outside the inn in 1928 and died in a second-floor room, contributing to ghost stories about the property. During the Great Depression in the mid-1930s, the inn was foreclosed on and auctioned off at the steps of the Jackson County Courthouse. Prominent Sylva resident Ephriam Stillwell purchased it and owned it for several decades. Over time the inn developed the nickname “Grand Old Lady.” The last passenger train passed through Balsam on July 4, 1948, and the inn fell into disrepair. The hotel was closed by the health department in 1988.

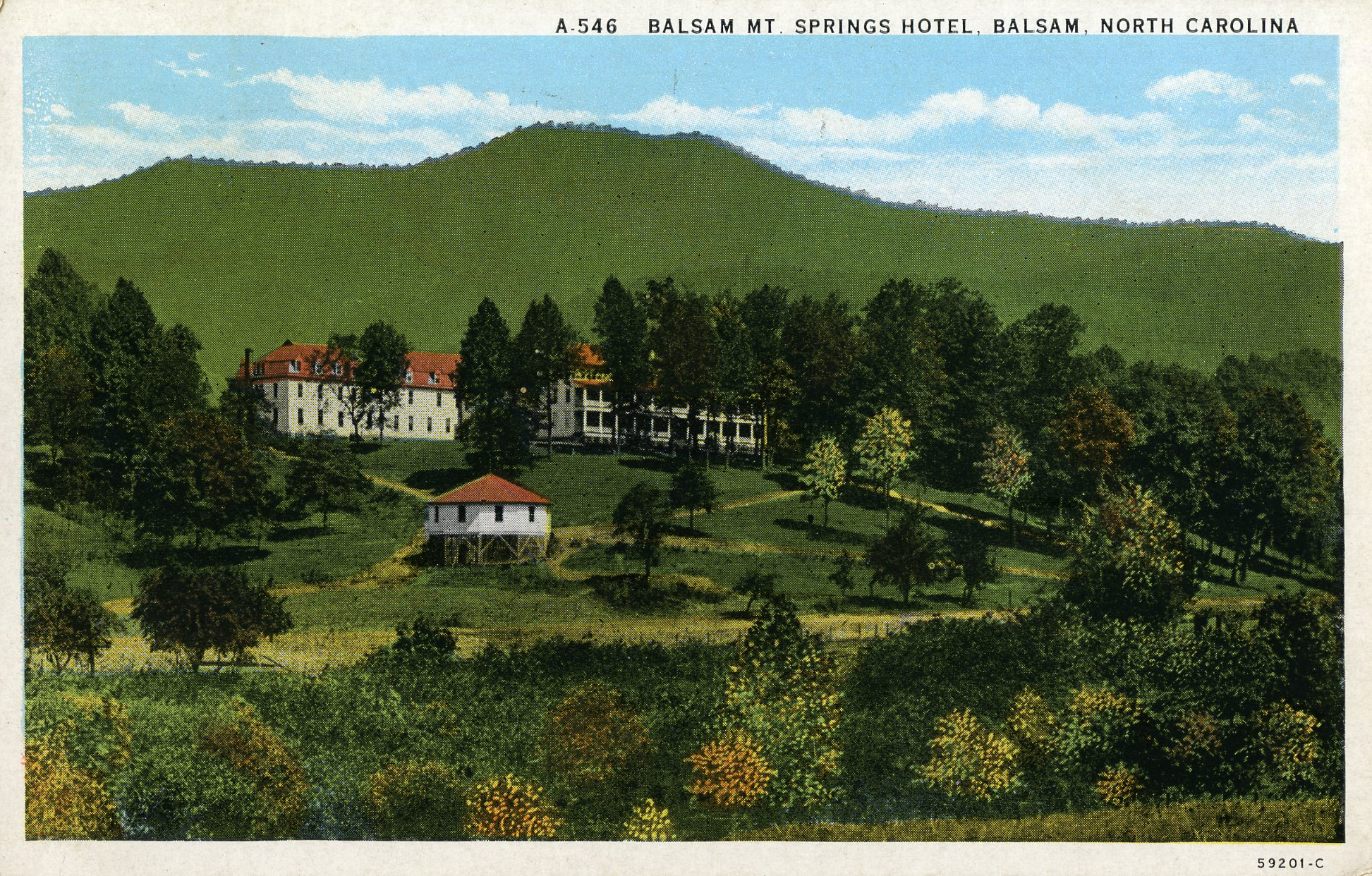
1932 postcard

The inn was bought from the Stillwell family in 1990 by Merrily Teasley, an experienced innkeeper from Tennessee who stumbled across the hotel while hiking and borrowed money to make the purchase. She restored the property, adding heating (the inn had never been open year-round before), paring the amount of guest rooms by half to 53, and providing private bathrooms for guests. She reopened the first two floors in July 1991. The dining porch addition she built won the Gertrude S. Carraway Award of Merit from Preservation North Carolina in 1995. The third floor reopened to guests in 1996. The historic preservation was certified by the U.S. Department of Interior. The owners lived in a residence on the second floor. While the inn was built with modern conveniences such as hot and cold water and electric light, modern owners intentionally kept phones, TVs, and radios out of rooms to encourage guests to make friends.

Marzena B. Wyszynska bought the inn in December 2017 and renamed it the Grand Old Lady Hotel shortly before it closed in 2020 and was put up for sale. As of 2024, the inn has reopened and is operated and owned by Lorraine and Rodney Conard. The property continues to use spring water and has reverted to its former name, the Balsam Mountain Inn. The Conards previously restored the historic Boone-Withers House in Waynesville.

== See also ==
- National Register of Historic Places listings in Jackson County, North Carolina
