= Blue Ridge Southern Railroad =

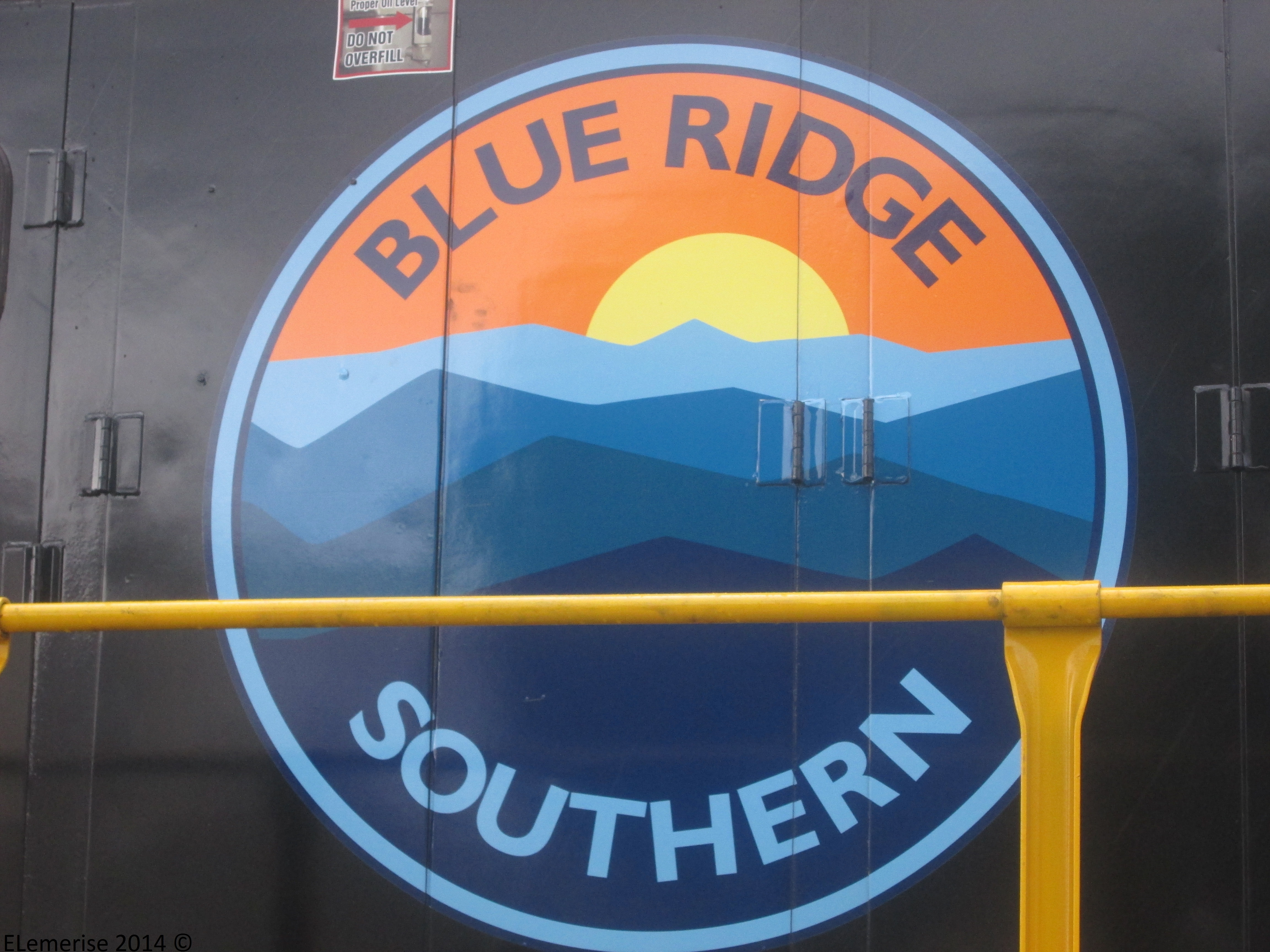

Overview
- Headquarters: Canton, North Carolina
- Reporting mark: BLU
- Locale: North Carolina
- Dates of operation: 2014–present
- Predecessor: Southern Railway, Norfolk Southern

Technical
- Track gauge: 4 ft 8 1/2 in (1,435 mm) standard gauge
- Length: 91.8 miles (147.7 kilometers)

Other
- Website: watco.com/railroads/BLU

The Blue Ridge Southern Railroad (reporting mark BLU) is a Class III shortline railroad operating over 91.8 miles (147.7 kilometres) of track in Western North Carolina. The railroad is owned by Watco of Pittsburg, Kansas, and operates three lines that connect in the Asheville area that were previously owned by Norfolk Southern. The railroad is based out of Canton, North Carolina, and utilizes 11 locomotives. Operations began on 26 July 2014.

== History ==
The Blue Ridge Southern Railroad was formed on 25 June 2014 when Watco reached a definitive agreement with Norfolk Southern for the purchase of 91.8 miles of branchlines in Western North Carolina. The railroad began operations with a fleet of 11 diesel electric locomotives, which consist of three SD40-2s, four SD40M-2 rebuilds, and four GP39-2s.

The announcement to sell the lines that would become the Blue Ridge Southern Railroad was made in a Norfolk Southern corporate meeting in April 2014.

== Lines operated ==
| NS Line | North/East terminus | South/West terminus | Industries |
|---|---|---|---|
| W Line (Saluda Line) | Asheville - MP 1.0 | East Flat Rock - MP 26.0 | Southern Concrete Materials (numerous locations), Cane Creek Industrial Park, Kimberly Clark (Naples) |
| T Line (Murphy Branch) | Murphy Junction - MP 0.0 | Sylva - MP 47.0 (Interchange w/ GSMR) | Evergreen Packaging (Waynesville), Vulcan Materials Quarry (Enka), Southern Concrete Materials (Waynesville), Giles (maker of Epsom salts, Waynesville), T&S Hardwoods (Addie), Enterprise Solutions (Addie), Jackson Paper Manufacturing Co. (Sylva) |

== Roster ==
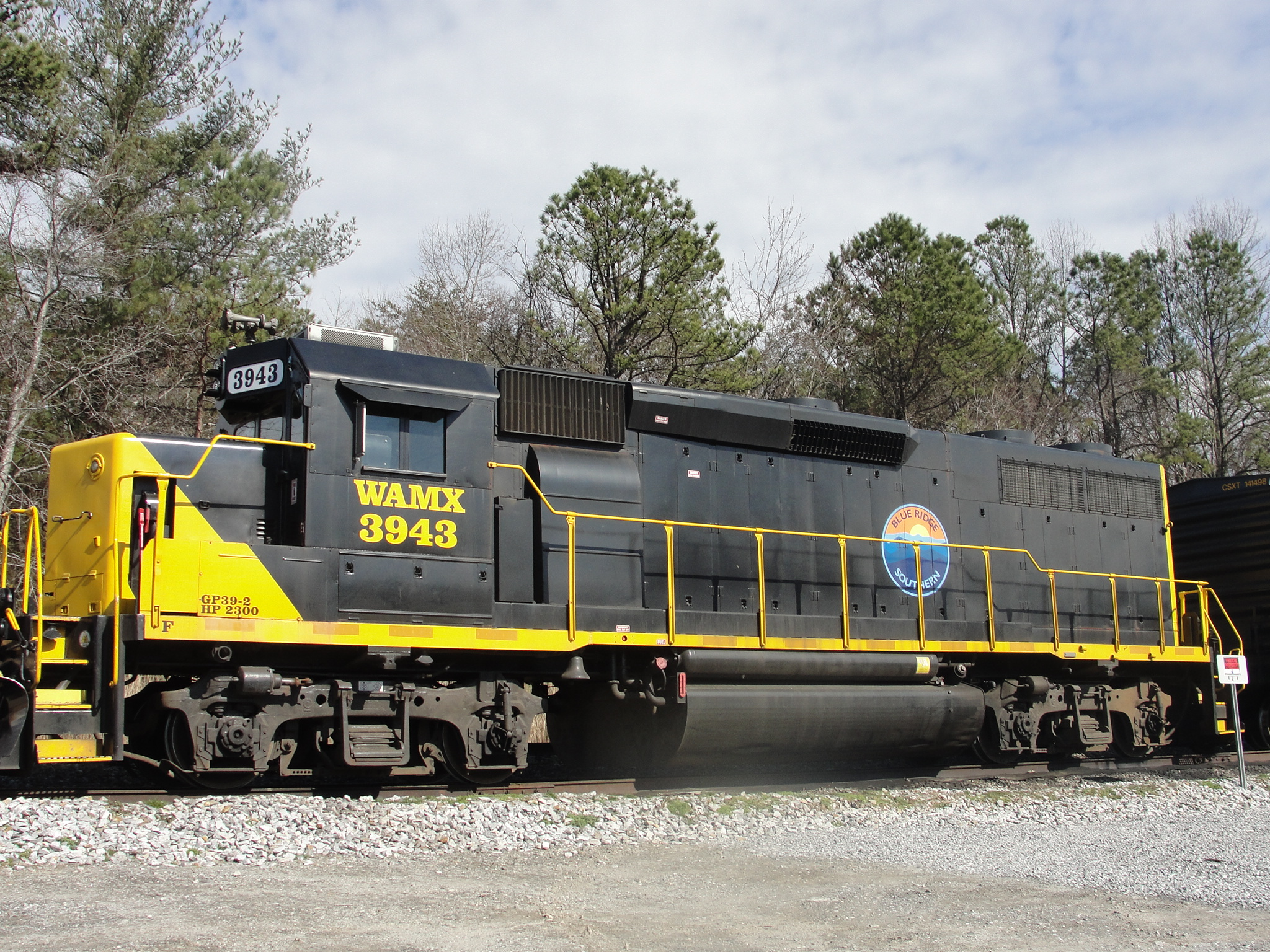
Blue Ridge Southern 3943 at Arden.

| Model | Road numbers |
|---|---|
| EMD GP39-2 | 3932, 3939, 3940, 3943, 3945 |
| EMD SD40-2 | 4205, has BLU logo on nose |
| EMD SD40M-2 | 4201 - 4204 |
