= Coburn, North Carolina =

- Unincorporated community
- Location within North Carolina
- Coordinates: 35°32′06″N 82°45′18″W
- Country: United States
- State: North Carolina
- County: Buncombe
- Elevation: 2,290 ft (698 m)
- Time zone: UTC-5 (Eastern (EST))
  - Summer (DST): UTC-4 (EDT)
- Zip Code(s): 28715
- Area code: 828
- GNIS feature ID: 1019713

Coburn is an unincorporated community in Buncombe County, North Carolina, United States. Coburn is located along US 74, West of Candler and East of Canton. At one time, Coburn was a whistle stop for the Southern Railway on the Murphy Branch.
