= Wesser, North Carolina =

- Unincorporated community
- Location within North Carolina
- Coordinates: 35°19′59″N 83°35′29″W
- Country: United States
- State: North Carolina
- County: Swain
- Named for: Wesser Creek
- Elevation: 1,722 ft (525 m)
- Time zone: UTC-5 (Eastern (EST))
  - Summer (DST): UTC-4 (EDT)
- Zip Code(s): 28713
- Area code: 828
- GNIS feature ID: 1023159

Wesser is an unincorporated community in Swain County, North Carolina, United States. Wesser is located along US 74, West of Almond and East of Hewitt. At one time, Wesser was a whistle stop for the Southern Railway on the Murphy Branch. The Great Smoky Mountains Railroad stops here during excursions. The Nantahala Outdoor Center is located in the vicinity.
