= Nantahala Lake =

Man made lake in Macon County, North Carolina

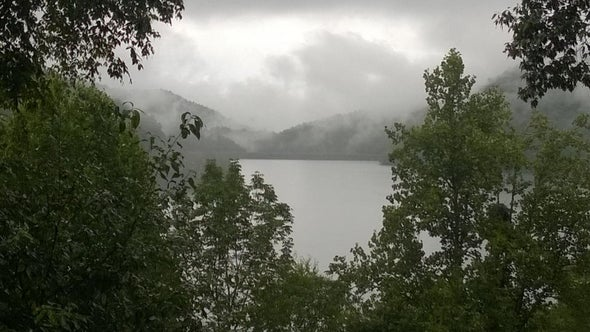
- View of Nantahala Lake, NC

- Location within North Carolina Location within the United States
- Location: Macon County, North Carolina
- Coordinates: 35°11′58″N 83°39′08″W
- Type: Reservoir
- Basin countries: United States
- Built: 1942
- Shore length^{1}: 42 mi (68 km)
- Surface elevation: 3,035 ft (925 m)
- ^{1} Shore length is not a well-defined measure.

Nantahala Lake (/ˌnæntəˈheɪlə/) is located in Macon County, North Carolina in the western part of the state. The lake is regulated and maintained by Duke Energy and is a major source of hydroelectric power to the region. Nantahala is located at 3,000 feet (910 m) in the Nantahala National Forest.

The lake was created in 1942 by Nantahala Power to provide electricity for war effort. With 42 miles (68 km) of shoreline, the lake offers recreational opportunities at Nantahala that include swimming, boating, skiing, and many other activities. Fishing aficionados will find largemouth bass, smallmouth bass, trout, catfish, and many different species of panfish. The lake water is very clear; there is almost no dissolved silt/clay. When daytime waves stir up the lake bed along the shoreline, however, the water within the first several feet of shore can become temporarily cloudy. Most of the shoreline plummets steeply into and beneath the water, limiting this effect.

== Water usage ==
The Nantahala River is supplied with its water by Nantahala Lake. Water is released from the Nantahala Dam to create the [whitewater rapids] in the river. When the river is not being supplied, it is very calm but when the water is released from the lake it is considered 'on,' which is when kayaking and rafting occurs.
