= Addie, North Carolina =

- Unincorporated community
- Location within North Carolina Location within the United States
- Coordinates: 35°24′21″N 83°9′35″W
- Country: United States
- State: North Carolina
- County: Jackson
- Elevation: 2,277 ft (694 m)
- Time zone: UTC-5 (Eastern (EST))
  - Summer (DST): UTC-4 (EDT)
- Area code: 828
- GNIS feature ID: 1018771

Addie is an unincorporated community in Jackson County, North Carolina, United States. Addie is located along U.S. Route 74, west of Willets-Ochre Hill and east of Sylva. The Jackson County School of Alternatives (the HUB) and Scotts Creek Elementary School are located here. T&S Hardwoods operates a lumber yard here, adjacent to the railroad that runs through the area.

The community was named for Nancy Adelaide Calhoun, the daughter of John Philemon Calhoun, who was the postmaster.

== History ==
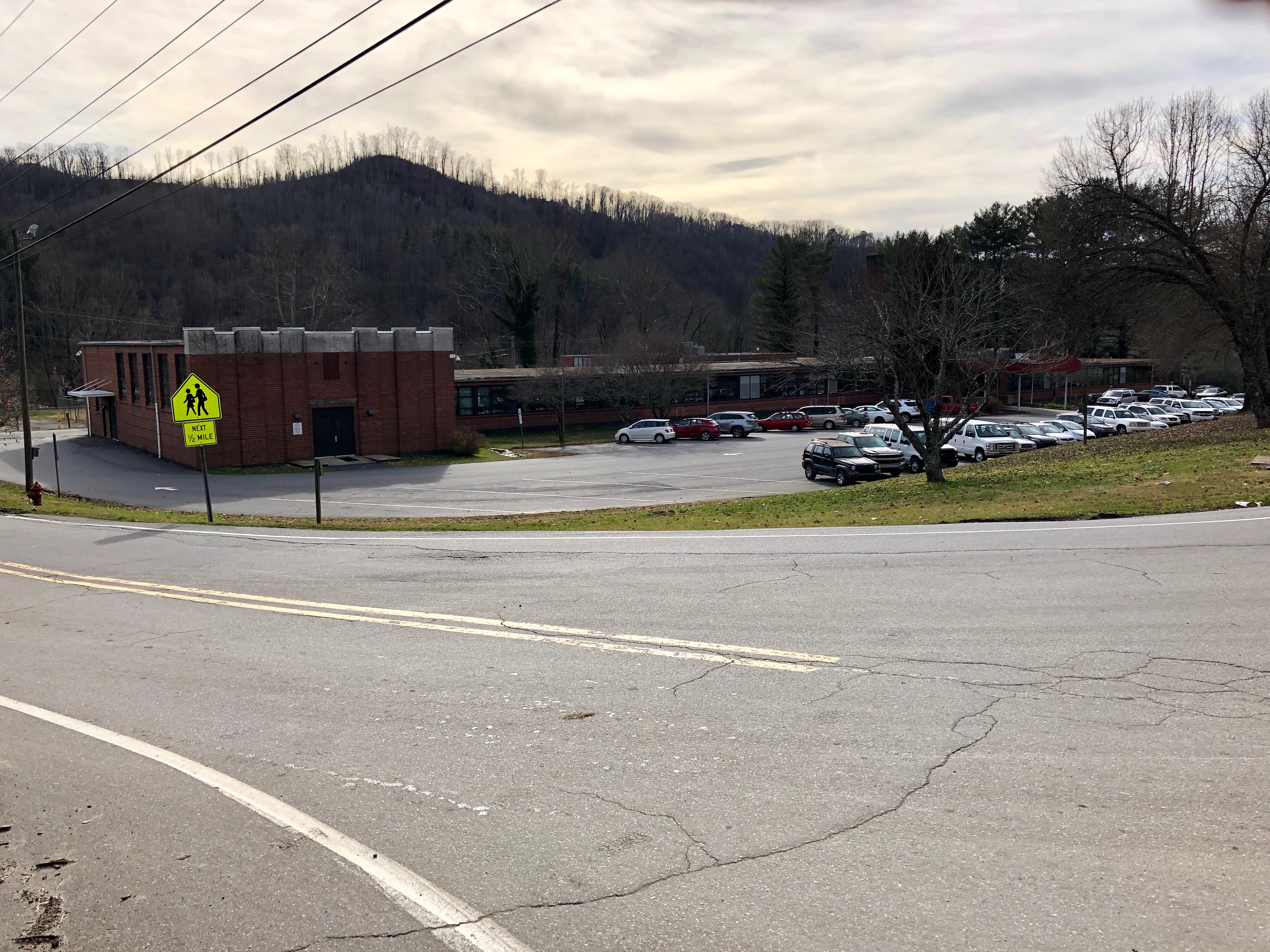
The former Scotts Creek Elementary School

Addie was founded in the 1880s when a work camp for the construction of the Murphy Branch of the Western North Carolina Railroad set up in the vicinity, and was named. The location would later serve as a depot and crew change for the Southern Railway.
