= Azalea, North Carolina =

- Populated place
- Interactive map of Azalea, North Carolina
- Coordinates: 35.58°N 82.471°W
- Country: United States
- State: North Carolina
- County: Buncombe
- Elevation: 2,051 ft (625 m)
- Time zone: UTC-5 (Eastern (EST))
  - Summer (DST): UTC-4 (EDT)
- Area code: 828
- GNIS feature ID: 1018888

Azalea is a populated place located within the city of Asheville, North Carolina in Buncombe County, North Carolina, United States.

== Geography ==
Azalea is located at latitude 35.58 and longitude -82.471. The elevation is 2,051 feet.
