= Nantahala River =

Stream in North Carolina, USA

Nantahala River Tributary to Little Tennessee River
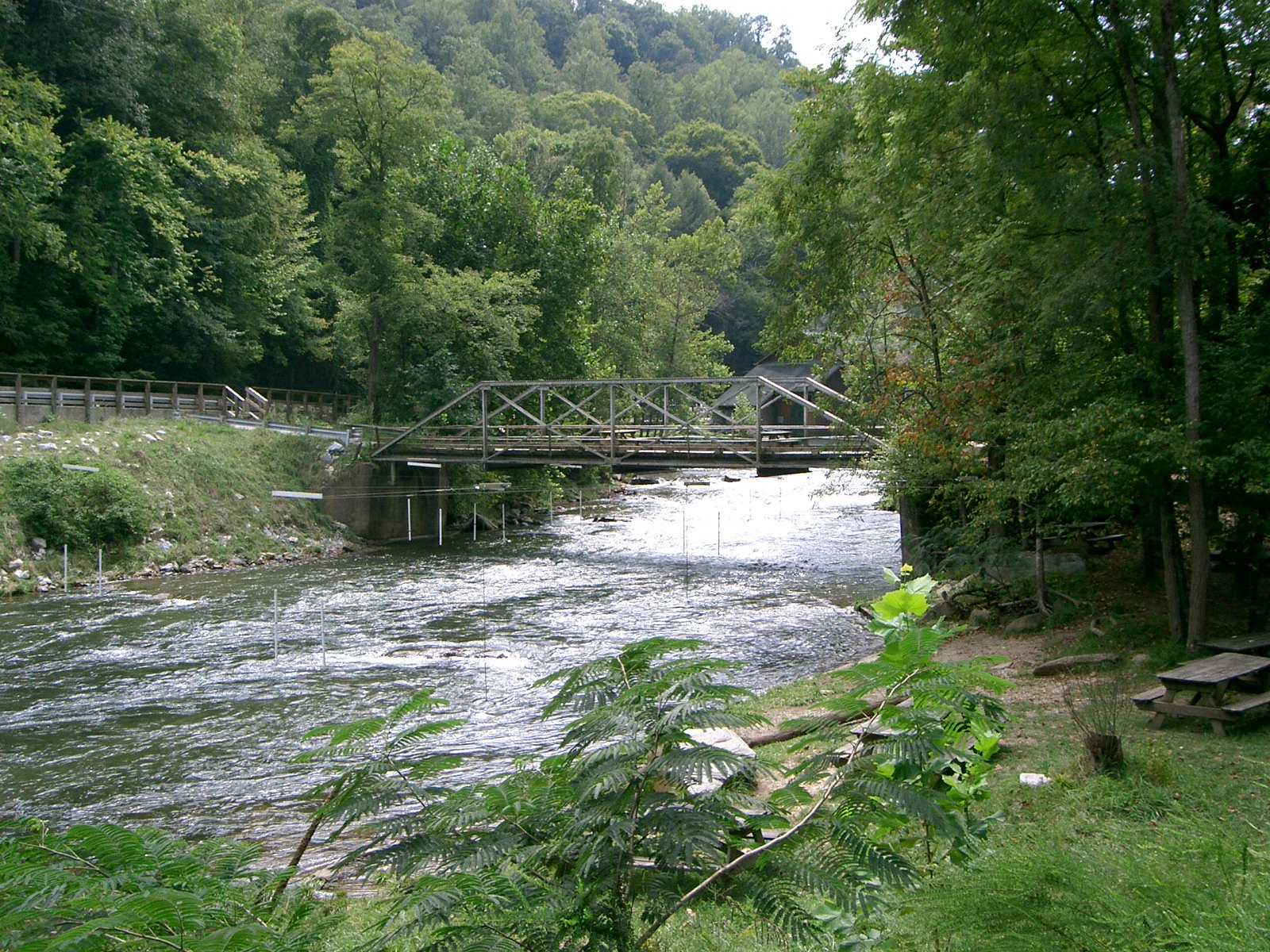
- Nantahala Bridge, showing the high water level even in late summer (September).

- Location of Nantahala River mouth Nantahala River (the United States)

Location
- Country: United States
- State: North Carolina
- County: Clay; Macon; Swain

Physical characteristics
- Source: confluence of Kilby Creek, Gulf Fork, and Big Laurel Branch
  - location: just west of Scream Ridge
  - coordinates: 35°01′04″N 083°30′24″W
  - elevation: 3,800 ft (1,200 m)
- Mouth: Little Tennessee River
  - location: Fontana Lake
  - coordinates: 35°23′00″N 083°30′24″W
  - elevation: 1,708 ft (521 m)
- Length: 47.85 mi (77.01 km)
- Basin size: 175.33 square miles (454.1 km^{2})
- Discharge
  - location: Little Tennessee River (Fontana Lake)
  - average: 612.33 cu ft/s (17.339 m^{3}/s) at mouth with Little Tennessee River

Basin features
- Progression: generally north
- River system: Little Tennessee River
- Tributaries
  - left: Indian Creek, Nichols Branch, Little Indian Creek, Kimsey Creek, Park Creek, Black Creek, Nova Scotia Branch, Buck Creek, Tate Branch, Tipton Branch, Clear Creek, Johnson Branch, Choga Creek, Lambert Cove, Dicks Creek, Appletree Branch, Walnut Cove, Poplar Cove, Pierce Creek, Rowlin Creek, Ledbetter Creek, Mudcut Branch, Mountain Branch, Morris Branch, Tomahawk Branch, Watia Creek, Jake Branch, Pump Branch, Turkey Branch
  - right: Mooney Creek, Bearpen Creek, Thomas Branch, Hurricane Creek, Curtis Creek, Long Branch, Laurel Branch, Little Rock Branch, Trough Branch, Morris Branch, Bryson Branch, Factory Branch, Roaring Fork, Tyler Branch, Jarrett Creek, Rocky Branch, Wine Spring Creek, Rowland Branch, Beech Cove Branch, White Oak Creek, Camp Branch, Queens Creek, Silvermine Creek, Wesser Creek, Bird Falls Branch, Buckner Branch, Euchiella Branch, Siles Branch
- Waterbodies: Nantahala Lake, Fontana Lake
- Bridges: Standing Indian Loop, US 64, Thunderstruck Lane, Swinging Bridge Lane, Nantahala Dam Road, Junaluska Road, Wayah Road (x8), US 74, Pardon Bridge Road, Old Storehouse Road, NC 28

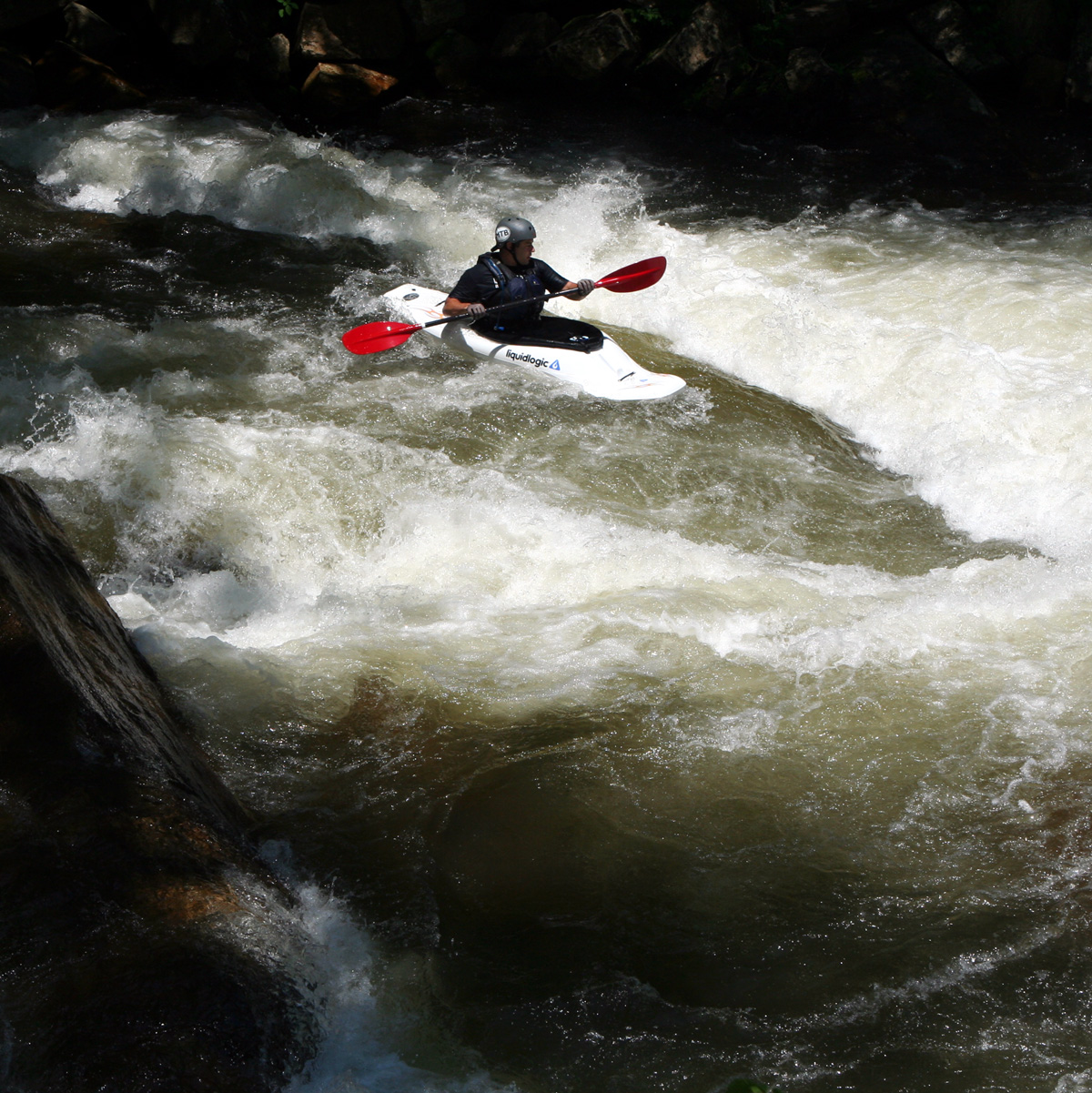
Playboater on the Nantahala River

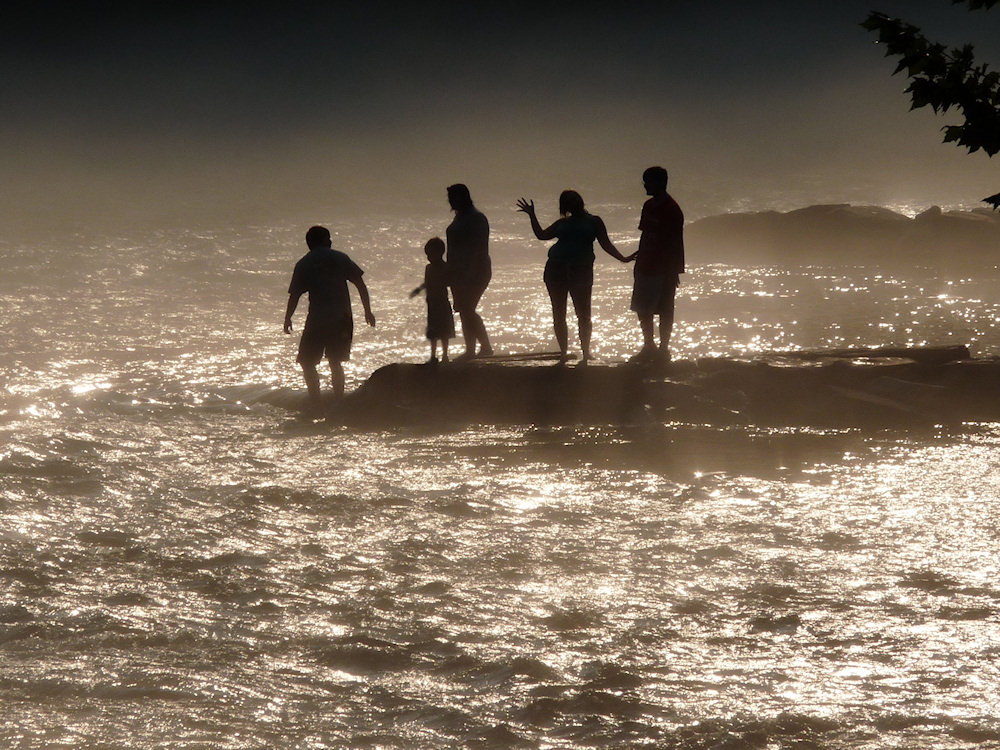
Mist in Nantahala Gorge, where cold water is released from the dam

The Nantahala River (/ˌnæntəˈheɪlə/) is a river in western North Carolina in the United States, within the Nantahala National Forest, and near the Great Smoky Mountains National Park. Two-lane U.S. Highway 19/74 runs along the river, picnic areas dotting the route. In 1839, this was an unimproved large path, part of what became known as the Trail of Tears as the Cherokee people were forcibly removed from their homelands in this region to west of the Mississippi River and Indian Territory.

The river rises near the border of Georgia and North Carolina, close to the Southern Nantahala Wilderness and the Appalachian Trail. It flows into the Little Tennessee River at Fontana Lake, a reservoir formed behind Fontana Dam.

The word Nantahala is Cherokee and means "Land of the Noonday Sun". The river runs through a narrow and steep gorge where in some areas the sun reaches the ground only when it is directly overhead during the middle of the day. During the colonial era, Cherokee towns along the Nantahala, upper Hiwassee River, and Valley River in what is now North Carolina were known as the Valley Towns.

== Paddling ==
This river is popular with whitewater rafters, canoeists, and kayakers. Commercial rafting began in 1972 when the Nantahala Outdoor Center opened, leading to thousands of paddlers annually running the river. Today there are ten different outfitters operating on the Nantahala river. Each outfitter has a permit issued by the Forest Service which allows them to commercially raft the river. The Nantahala is one of the most popular rivers in the southeastern United States for paddlers of all skill levels.

== Fishing ==
The Nantahala is also a popular destination for fly fishing. Trout Unlimited has named the river one of the 100 Best Trout Streams in America, and it is widely regarded as one of the premier destinations for trout fishing in the Eastern United States. The river is frequently used for competitions, clinics, and practices held by the US Men's and US Youth National Fly Fishing teams. Most recently, the Nantahala played host to the 2015 US Youth National Fly Fishing Championship and the 2015 Men's Southeast Regional, with sessions held on the Upper and Lower sections, as well as the Raven's Fork on the nearby Cherokee Indian Reservation.

=== Lower Run ===
The part that can be rafted is 8 miles (13 km) long and has Class II and III rapids. It extends from the Nantahala Powerhouse to the town of Wesser. Twelve commercial outfitters are permitted by the USDA Forest Service to run guided trips. Two launch sites provide access. The main access is just downstream of the Nantahala powerhouse and upstream of "Patton's Run". The other is at the Ferebee Memorial Picnic Area near where US 74 crosses the river. There are two take-out points, one above and one below "Upper Nantahala Falls." Notable rapids include "Patton's Run," "Quarry," "Whirlpool," "Surfers," "Bulls Run," and "Upper Nantahala Falls." Just beyond the main take-out point in Wesser lies Lower Nantahala Falls, or Wesser Falls, which drops off at about a 45-degree angle with many sharp rocks. Immediately after this point the Nantahala flows into Fontana Lake.

The flow rate of this section of the Nantahala is dependent on releases from Nantahala Lake, which is controlled by Duke Energy. The Nantahala dam is a diversion dam; the water that normally flows through the river is diverted through a 5.5-mile (8.9 km) penstock before flowing through the Nantahala Powerhouse and back into the original river channel far downstream. The river is "on" when Duke Energy is generating electricity and releasing water. From late spring to early fall Duke Energy follows a regular release schedule to help support commercial rafting.

The opening of the main penstock is near the bottom of the Nantahala dam, and is underground for most of its length. Because of this the discharged water is always at or near the average groundwater temperature, which in this region is in the mid 50s (F).

This section of river is popular as a fly fishing destination. Although it is regularly stocked under North Carolina's Hatchery Supported regulations, it is home to one of North Carolina's healthiest populations of wild, stream-born Rainbow Trout. The river also has a self-sustaining population of Brown Trout, many of which grow large. The current North Carolina state record Brown Trout, weighing 24 lb 10 oz (11.2 kg), was caught from the Lower Nantahala in 1998, and specimens of 10 lb (4.5 kg) or greater are fairly common.

=== Upper Run ===
The upper section of the river extends from the Nantahala Dam to the Nantahala Powerhouse. The uppermost section just below Whiteoak Falls is known as the Nantahala Cascades and is an extremely steep and challenging whitewater route. Upon reaching the bridge, the river becomes the Upper Nantahala and flattens out to become a solid Class III-IV run. The regular Nantahala River flow is diverted through a penstock so the only water normally flowing through this section comes from tributaries like Dick's Creek. However, during periods of very wet weather, or the rare long-term outage at the powerhouse, the river flows full. This section of the channel is narrow and features several Class III+ to V rapids including "The Horns of God", "Big Kahuna", and "Chinese Feet."

In the Winter months, the Upper Nantahala is maintained as a delayed-harvest trout fishery from the mouth of Whiteoak Creek downstream to the Nantahala Powerhouse. The state of North Carolina stocks approximately 10,000 Brown, Rainbow, and Brook Trout annually in the upper river on top of an already existing population of stream-born Rainbow and Brown Trout.
