= Beta, North Carolina =

- Unincorporated community
- Location within North Carolina Location within the United States
- Coordinates: 35°23′41″N 83°11′26″W
- Country: United States
- State: North Carolina
- County: Jackson
- Elevation: 2,142 ft (653 m)
- Time zone: UTC-5 (Eastern (EST))
  - Summer (DST): UTC-4 (EDT)
- Area code: 828
- GNIS feature ID: 981059

Beta is an unincorporated community in Jackson County, North Carolina, United States. Beta is located along U.S. Route 74, west of Addie and east of Sylva.

When Jackson County was formed in 1851, the home of Dan Bryson, located in Beta, served as the first courthouse.

John Brinkley, a quack doctor, early radio broadcaster, and independent candidate for governor of Kansas, was born in Beta in 1885.
