= Saunook, North Carolina =

- Unincorporated community
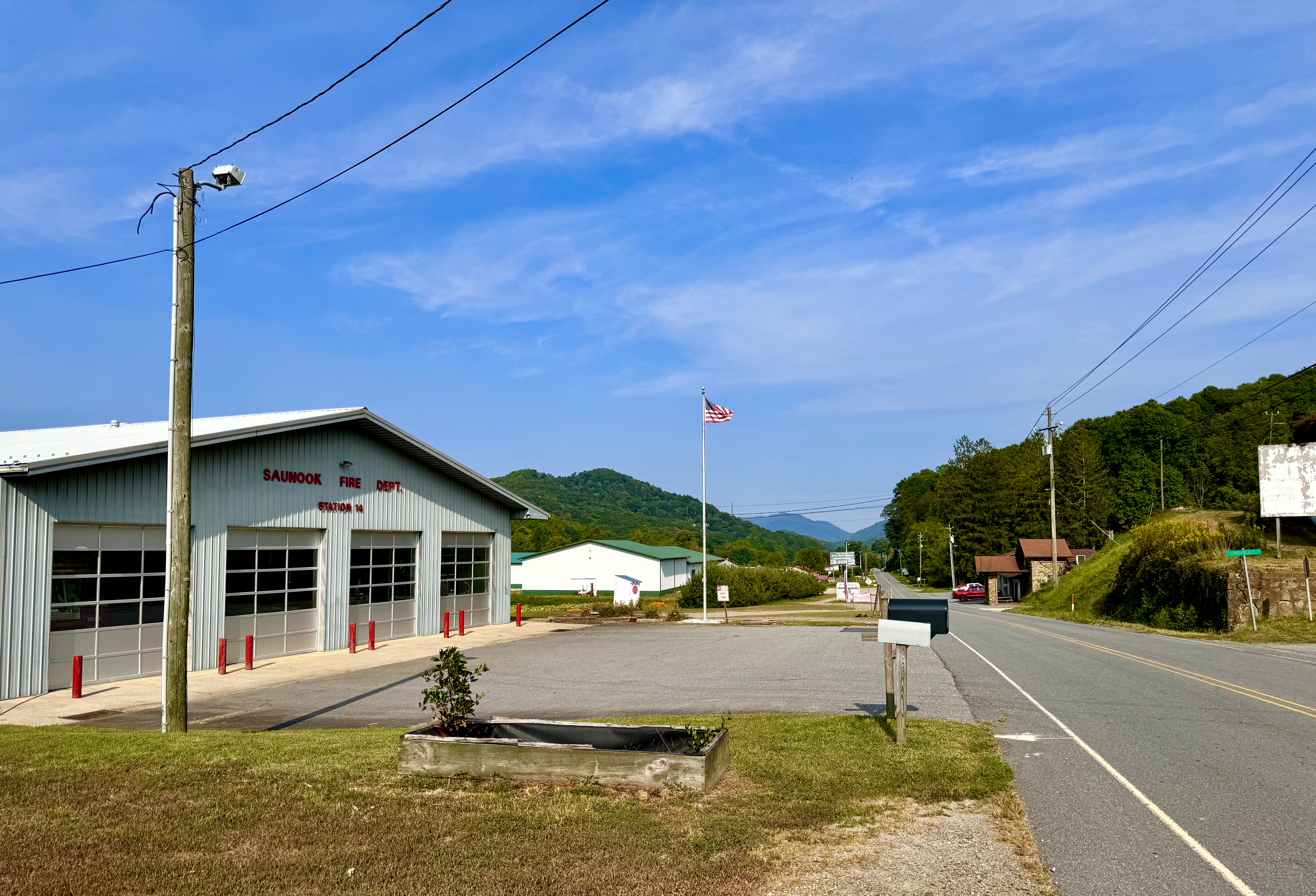
- The Saunook Fire Department on Old Balsam Rd.

- Location within North Carolina Location within the United States
- Coordinates: 35°27′06″N 83°02′40″W
- Country: United States
- State: North Carolina
- County: Haywood
- Elevation: 3,009 ft (917 m)
- Time zone: UTC-5 (Eastern (EST))
  - Summer (DST): UTC-4 (EDT)
- Zip Code(s): 28786
- Area code: 828
- GNIS feature ID: 1022513

Saunook is an unincorporated community in Haywood County, North Carolina, United States. Saunook is located along US 74, west of Waynesville and east of Balsam.

== History ==
Prior to European colonization, the area that is now Saunook was inhabited by the Cherokee people and other Indigenous peoples for thousands of years. The Cherokee in Western North Carolina are known as the Eastern Band of Cherokee Indians, a federally recognized tribe.
