= Balsam, North Carolina =

Unincorporated community in North Carolina, United States

- Unincorporated community
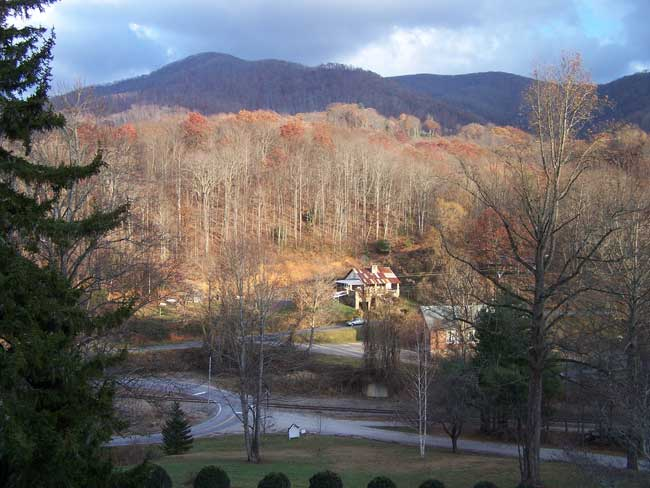
- View from the Balsam Mountain Inn

- Location within North Carolina Location within the United States
- Coordinates: 35.42680°N 83.08530°W
- Country: United States
- State: North Carolina
- County: Jackson
- Incorporated: 1951 (inactive)
- Named for: Balsam Mountains

Area
  - Land: 3.2 sq mi (8.3 km^{2})
  - Water: 0.0 sq mi (0 km^{2})
- Elevation: 3,304 ft (1,007 m)

Population (2000)
  - Total: 49
  - Density: 15/sq mi (5.9/km^{2})
- Time zone: UTC-5 (Eastern (EST))
  - Summer (DST): UTC-4 (EDT)
- ZIP code: 28707
- FIPS code: 828
- GNIS feature ID: 1018943

Balsam is an unincorporated community in Jackson County, North Carolina, United States. Named after the Balsam Mountains, it is home of the highest standard-gauge railroad east of the Rocky Mountains, at 3,315 feet (1,010 m).

The community is located near Balsam Gap, a mountain pass between the Great Balsam Mountains and the Plott Balsams, two of the highest ranges in the Appalachian Mountains. The town and ranges are named after the nicknames of the red spruce and Fraser fir ("he-balsam" and "she-balsam," respectively), which are the dominant tree types at the highest elevations in the Southern Appalachian mountains.

== Demographics ==
As of the census of 2000, there were 49 people, 14 households, and 11 families residing in the town. The population density was 759.7 inhabitants per square mile (293.3/km^{2}). There were 41 housing units at an average density of 400.3 per square mile (154.6/km^{2}). The racial makeup of the town was 75.1% White, 12.3% African American, 0.9% Native American, 3.6% Asian, 5.5% from other races, and 2.4% from two or more races. Hispanic or Latino of any race were 12.5% of the population.

There were 14 households, out of which 50.0% had children under the age of 18 living with them, 71.4% were married couples living together, 0.0% had a female householder with no husband present, and 21.4% were non-families. 0.0% of all households were made up of individuals, and 21.4% had someone living alone who was 65 years of age or older. The average household size was 3.50 and the average family size was 3.73.

In the town the population was spread out, with 34.7% under the age of 20, 4.1% from 20 to 24, 10.2% from 25 to 34, 14.3% from 35 to 44, 14.5% from 45 to 64, and 12.2% who were 65 years of age or older. The median age was 36.5 years. The population was 40.8% male, 30.6% female for people 18 and older.

The median income for a household in the town was $44,531, and the median income for a family was $43,750. The per capita income for the town was $13,869. No families and 0.0% of the population were below the poverty line.

== History ==
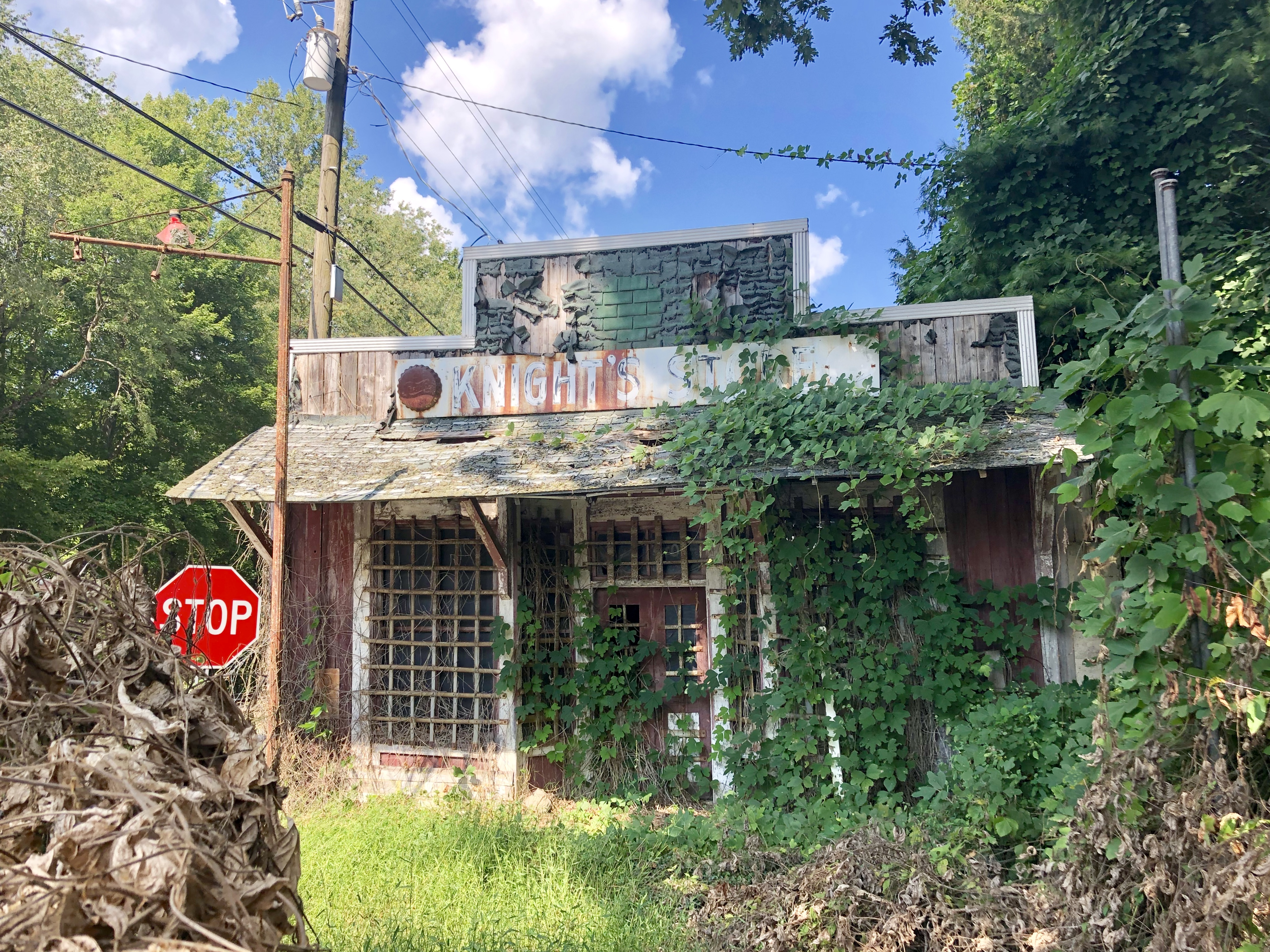
The former Knight's Store, located near the center of Balsam, has sat vacant since 1979.

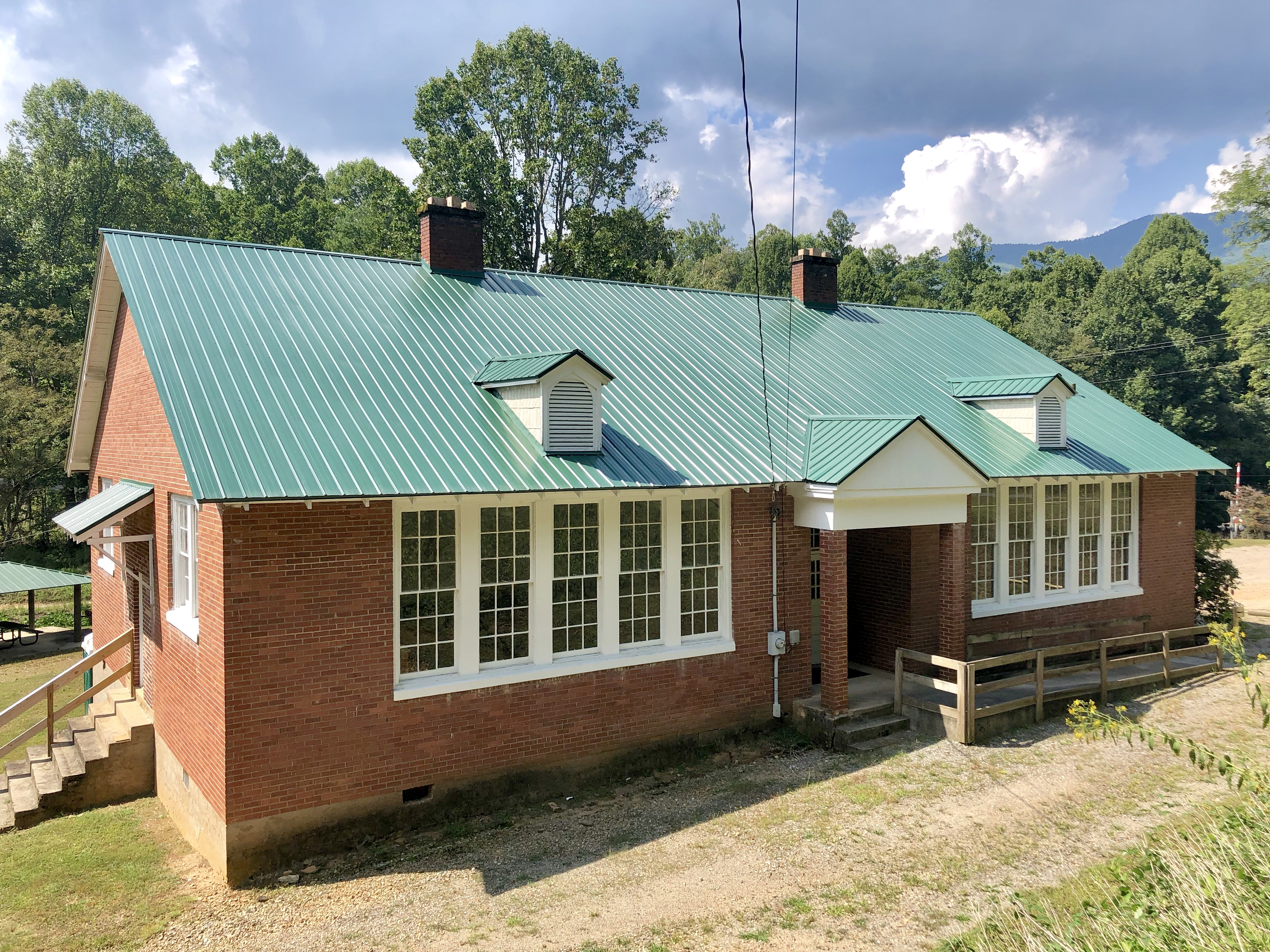
The old Balsam School, constructed in 1940, now serves as the local Community Center.

Balsam was a tourist stop on the Murphy Branch of the Western North Carolina Railroad, later the Southern Railway. In the early 20th century, tourists travelled from Asheville to the train depot in Balsam and would stay just up the hill, at the Balsam Mountain Inn. Today, the depot no longer stands at the original site. It was moved up the ridge in the 1960s to a private location and the original siding sees little use by the Norfolk Southern Railway. Balsam Mountain Inn, renovated in 1990 and refurbished in 2004 is still in operation, serves as a nostalgic reminder of a by-gone era with its restaurant. Another notable building, Knight's Store, stands near where the depot once stood at the bottom of the hill the Balsam Mountain Inn sits on. The building was built in the early 1900s and closed in 1979.

The community of Willets is located near Balsam and is sometimes confused as being a part of Balsam, though it is not. Balsam once had several stores, churches, houses, the Balsam Mountain Inn, its own Depot and School, but most remaining buildings are faded memories of what once was. The construction of 4-Lane US 74/23 in the 1970s cut into the community, caused the demolition of several buildings, and further opened Balsam to the outside world. Today it is largely a bedroom community for Sylva and Waynesville. The stores are all long closed though a few of the old store buildings still stand and the schools were consolidated into Scotts Creek Elementary in 1951. The mills are long closed and demolished. Balsam still has a post office and its inn. Balsam Depot was moved up a hill in the 1960s and became a house. Balsam is a shadow of the thriving small tourist town it was from the 1890s up until the 1930s.

== Recreation ==
Balsam is located near several popular recreational areas, some of which are accessible from the nearby Blue Ridge Parkway.

- Waterrock Knob
- Moonshine Creek Campground
- Graveyard Fields
- Balsam Mountain Inn
