= Hewitt, North Carolina =

- Unincorporated community
- Location within North Carolina Location within the United States
- Coordinates: 35°18′32″N 83°38′52″W
- Country: United States
- State: North Carolina
- County: Swain
- Elevation: 1,929 ft (588 m)
- Time zone: UTC-5 (Eastern (EST))
  - Summer (DST): UTC-4 (EDT)
- Zip Code(s): 28713
- Area code: 828
- GNIS feature ID: 1020695

Hewitt is an unincorporated community in Swain County, North Carolina, United States. Hewitt is located along US 74, West of Bryson City and East of Topton.

A talc and limestone mine is located in Hewitt.
