= Hazelwood, North Carolina =

- Neighborhood
- Interactive map of Hazelwood, North Carolina
- Country: United States
- State: North Carolina
- County: Haywood
- Incorporated: 1905
- Time zone: UTC−5 (Eastern)
  - Summer (DST): UTC−4 (EDT)
- ZIP code: 28738
- Area code: 828
- Website: www.townofwaynesville.org

Hazelwood is a former incorporated town in Haywood County, North Carolina, that is currently a neighborhood of the town of Waynesville.

== History ==
In 1893, businessman W. H. Cole moved to Haywood County, North Carolina to establish a sawmill on unoccupied land. A community grew around his mill which he dubbed Hazelwood. It was incorporated as a town by the North Carolina General Assembly in 1905.

In 1976, an Annexation Feasibility Study estimated a population of 56 people in the study area. The study concluded that annexation would be economically feasible if the town developed its own municipal water supply.

In 1982, a fire broke out at Benfield Industries, a bulk chemical mixing and packaging plant in Hazelwood and was referred to as "the day Hazelwood almost exploded".

In July 1995, Hazelwood merged with the town of Waynesville due to the former's financial issues.

== Works cited ==
- Allen, W. C. (1908). Centennial of Haywood County and Its County Seat, Waynesville, N.C. Waynesville, North Carolina: Courier Printing Company.
