= Western North Carolina Railroad =

Defunct railway line in the North Carolina, USA

Overview
- Locale: North Carolina
- Dates of operation: 1855–1894
- Successor: Southern Railway (U.S.)

Technical
- Track gauge: 1,435 mm (4 ft 8 1/2 in)
- Previous gauge: 4 ft 8 in (1,422 mm)

Western North-Carolina Railroad Company was incorporated under act of North Carolina on February 15, 1855. Western North Carolina Railroad Company went through several slight changes in name and reorganizations before being sold at foreclosure on August 21, 1894, and conveyed to Southern Railway (U.S.) on August 22, 1894.

Future Confederate States Army officer Samuel McDowell Tate was instrumental in planning and sponsoring the construction of the first leg of the railroad in 1855, then in managing it in the era after the American Civil War.

The state of North Carolina helped finance, build, and operate the new railroad through subscription to $1.4 million of the $2.1 million in capital stock, which was paid for through the issuance of state bonds.

The company constructed 76 miles (122 km) of 4 ft 8 in (1,422 mm) gauge railroad line between Salisbury, North Carolina, and a point near Morganton, North Carolina, between 1858 and 1863. The Western North Carolina Railroad was halted because of resistance from voters. Voters were angry about that law allowed purchasers of private bonds, that paid one third of the cost, to have the trains veer to their towns. The provision of the laws that allowed this was not repealed until Reconstruction, after the Civil War. Charles F. Fisher, later Colonel commanding the 6th North Carolina Regiment, who was killed leading a charge on a Union Army battery at the First Battle of Bull Run, had the initial contract to construct the line.

Western North Carolina Railroad Company's charter was amended by act of North Carolina, August 19, 1868, which divided the company's property between Western North Carolina Rail Road Company - Eastern Division and Western North Carolina Rail Road Company - Western Division. Western North Carolina Rail Road Company - Eastern Division acquired the existing 76 miles (122 km) of railroad line. Western North Carolina Rail Road Company - Western Division acquired the franchise to build a railroad line from the French Broad River to Paint Rock, Alabama, and Ducktown, Tennessee, but did not complete construction of any part of the proposed railroad line.

Western North Carolina Rail Road Company - Eastern Division constructed 35.1 miles (56.5 km) of railroad line between a point near Morganton, North Carolina, and Old Fort, North Carolina, in 1869. Five-hundred African Americans were assigned to provide back breaking labor through Convict lease which was a near continuation of slavery as charges were often only applied to people of African descent. Men were shipped to and from the worksite in iron shackles.

Western North Carolina Rail Road Company - Eastern Division was sold at foreclosure, June 22, 1875, and conveyed to the state of North Carolina, August 3, 1875. Western North Carolina Rail Road Company - Western Division was sold in settlement of a judgment, July 8, 1872. After several changes in title, Western North Carolina Rail Road Company - Western Division was acquired by the state of North Carolina on April 17, 1875. Western North Carolina Rail Road Company - Western Division was consolidated with Western North Carolina Railroad Company - Eastern Division to form Western North Carolina Railroad Company (No. 2), which had been incorporated March 3, 1873 in anticipation of the sale of the property of the Western North Carolina Railroad Company - Eastern Division. Three-fourths of the capital stock was held by the state of North Carolina and one-fourth was held by private stockholders.

Western North Carolina Railroad Company (No. 2) constructed 23.2 miles (37.3 km) of railroad line between Old Fort, North Carolina and Azalea, North Carolina in 1879. This included the 1,822-foot Swannanoa Tunnel, which one report said cost the lives of 23 prisoners. The first train, the Salisbury, weighed seventeen tons and was pulled using ropes by convicts who laid track in front of it.

Western North Carolina Railroad Company (No. 2) was sold at foreclosure, April 27, 1880, and conveyed to Western North Carolina Railroad Company (No. 3) on May 27, 1880. Western North Carolina Railroad Company (No. 3) was incorporated under act of North Carolina, May 27, 1880. The Richmond and West Point Terminal Railway and Warehouse Company controlled the company through ownership of a majority of the outstanding capital stock. Mortgage bonds were issued to the State of North Carolina in partial consideration for the acquisition of the property while preferred stock was issued to the private stockholders. In July 1893, the Richmond Terminal Reorganization Committee obtained control of the company.

Western North Carolina Railroad Company (No. 3) constructed 49.6 miles (79.8 km) of railroad line between Azalea, North Carolina, and Paint Rock, North Carolina, in 1882 and 122.6 miles (197.3 km) of railroad line between Asheville, North Carolina, and Murphy, North Carolina, in 1882–1890. The construction work was performed by The American Construction Company, a corporation controlled by the Richmond and West Point Terminal Railway and Warehouse Company. Nineteen African-American prisoners on their way to work on the Cowee Tunnel drowned in the Tuckasegee River weighted down by their shackles. Constructed for the railway finished in 1891.

The property of Western North Carolina Railroad Company (No. 3) was leased and operated by the Richmond and Danville Railroad Company and its receivers from April 30, 1886, to August 31, 1894.

Western North Carolina Railroad Company (No. 3) was sold at foreclosure on August 21, 1894, and was conveyed to Southern Railway Company, August 22, 1894, although possession was retained by the receivers until August 31, 1894.

== See also ==
- Confederate railroads in the American Civil War
