= North Carolina Highway 281 =

State highway in North Carolina, US

North Carolina Highway 281

Route information
- Maintained by NCDOT
- Length: 36.6 mi (58.9 km)
- Existed: 1930–present
- Tourist routes: Whitewater Way

Major junctions
- South end: SC 130 at the South Carolina state line
- US 64 near Sapphire
- North end: NC 107 in Tuckasegee

Location
- Country: United States
- State: North Carolina
- Counties: Jackson, Transylvania

Highway system
- North Carolina Highway System; Interstate; US; State; Scenic
← NC 280	→ I-285

North Carolina Highway 281 (NC 281) is a primary state highway in the U.S. state of North Carolina. The highway runs north–south, connecting communities in western Jackson County and scenic areas of southwest Transylvania County. It is the only North Carolina state highway that changes numbers when crossing into South Carolina.

== Route description ==
NC 281 is a 36.6-mile (58.9 km) two-lane mountain highway that begins at the South Carolina state line in Jackson County, before quickly entering Transylvania County. In South Carolina, the road continues south as SC 130. It runs concurrent with US 64 near Sapphire, then goes 2.5 miles (4.0 km) east where it splits and continues north to Lake Toxaway. Continuing northwest, the highway becomes aggressively curvy, steep, narrow and in a couple of locations is a gravel road. NC 281 crosses back into Jackson County at Owens Gap (3,590 ft (1,090 m), highest point on route), near Round Mountain to the northeast. The road widens again near the Tuckasegee River and passes by several lakes before ending in Tuckasegee.

The overall route shows the very best of what the Nantahala National Forest has to offer, but it is not recommended for commercial trucks, recreational vehicles or buses. In the winter, the highway can be considerably dangerous in snow and ice, and should not be attempted without proper equipment.

=== Scenic byways ===
Whitewater Way is a 9-mile (14 km) byway from near Sapphire to the South Carolina state line. It is named after the Whitewater Falls, which, at 411 ft (125 m), are the highest waterfalls east of the Rockies. Various other falls can also be found along Horsepasture River and multiple trails connect the area with rare shortia found in the area. The byway is not recommended for recreational vehicles or buses.

== History ==
NC 281 was established in 1930 as a new primary route, from NC 28, in Lake Toxaway, to NC 106, in Tuckasegee. In 1980, NC 281 was extended west along US 64 overlap, from Lake Toxaway to near Sapphire, and then along new primary routing to the South Carolina state line. Purpose of the route's extension was to connect visitors to the Whitewater Falls overlook area, maintained by the United States Forest Service. In January 1985, NC 281 was rerouted along Slick Fisher Road (SR 1306), north of Lake Toxaway; however in April of same year, NC 281 was reverted along its original routing. Around 1987, SC 130 was extended north from SC 11, near Salem, as a new primary routing to meetup with NC 281 at the state line; becoming the only non-continuous route number between the two states.

== Junction list ==
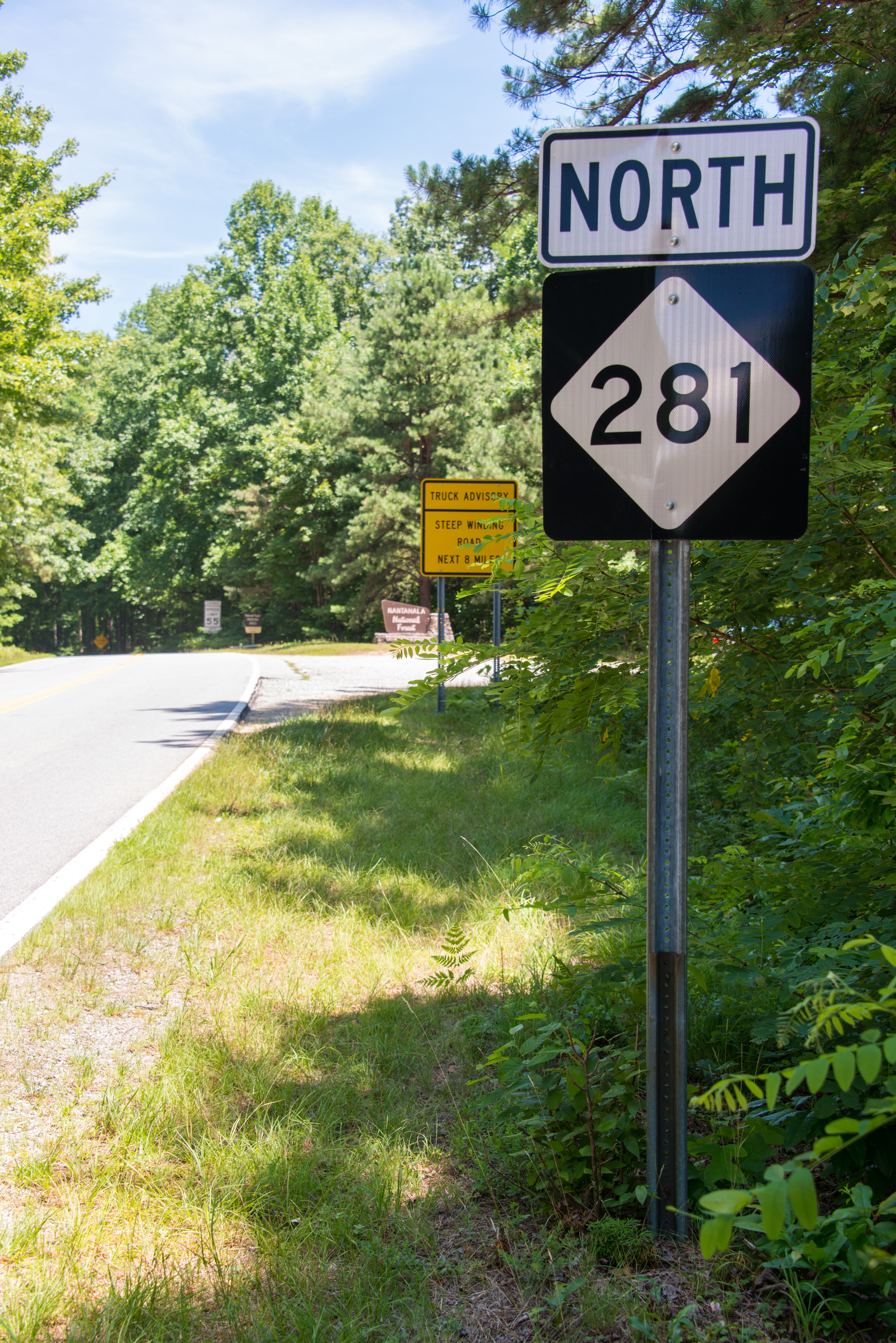
NC 281, near the state line

County	Location	mi	km	Destinations	Notes
Jackson		0.0	0.0	SC 130 south	Southern terminus, South Carolina state line
Transylvania		9.0	14.5	US 64 west (Rosman Highway) – Cashiers	West end of US 64 overlap
Transylvania	Lake Toxaway	11.5	18.5	US 64 east (Rosman Highway) – Brevard	East end of US 64 overlap
Jackson	Tuckasegee	36.6	58.9	NC 107 – Sylva, Glenville	Northern terminus
1.000 mi = 1.609 km; 1.000 km = 0.621 mi: Concurrency terminus
