= South Carolina Highway 107 =

Highway in South Carolina

South Carolina Highway 107

Route information
- Maintained by SCDOT
- Length: 15.290 mi (24.607 km)
- Existed: 1960s–present
- Tourist routes: Falling Waters Scenic Byway

Major junctions
- South end: SC 28 near Mountain Rest
- North end: NC 107 at the North Carolina state line

Location
- Country: United States
- State: South Carolina
- Counties: Oconee

Highway system
- South Carolina State Highway System; Interstate; US; State; Scenic
← SC 105	→ SC 109

South Carolina Highway 107 (SC 107) is a 15.290-mile (24.607 km) state highway in the western part of the U.S. state of South Carolina. It connects Oconee County with Jackson County, North Carolina and the Cashiers area. Nearly the entirety of the route is located in the Sumter National Forest.

== Route description ==
The route of SC 107 travels generally in a south–north direction, beginning at an intersection with SC 28. The route is rural and hilly in nature as it climbs the Blue Ridge Mountains to the North Carolina state line. There are several vistas overlooking Lake Jocassee and surrounding areas. The entirety of the highway is part of the state Falling Waters Scenic Byway.

The entrance to Oconee State Park is located along SC 107 near its southern terminus. There is a memorial just before the state line known as "Burrell's Place Pull-off". The route continues into North Carolina as North Carolina Highway 107 (NC 107).

== History ==
=== Burrell's Place Pull-off ===
A remote part of Oconee County, the vicinity of a military airplane crash during the Second World War, will become a memorial site—thanks to an effort inspired by county residents. A B-25 Army Air Corps plane crashed into a mountain top at night on March 10, 1943–21 miles north of Walhalla and just one mile south of the Fish Hatchery off Highway 107. The crash killed five service members on their way from Meridian, Mississippi, to Donaldson Army Air Base in Greenville. Jerry Dyar, Oconee Veterans Affairs Director, says a memorial marker with the names of the servicemen will be placed in an area known as "Burrell's Place Pull-off" at 2 o'clock Friday afternoon, March 21. "We thought March 21, seventy-one (71) years to the day after the wreckage was found would be a good time to display and dedicate the site," Dyar said. On March 21, 1943, a 15-year-old boy, Seab Crane was riding his horse along Moody Trail to visit his friends near the Fish Hatchery when his horse suddenly became "spooked" by an unknown foreign object on the riding trail. The object turned out to be one of the plane’s engines. And that's what led to the discovery of the downed plane.

== Major intersections ==
The entire route is in Oconee County.

Location	mi	km	Destinations	Notes
	0.000	0.000	SC 28 (Highlands Highway) – Walhalla, Highlands	Southern terminus
	15.290	24.607	NC 107 north – Cashiers	Continuation into North Carolina
1.000 mi = 1.609 km; 1.000 km = 0.621 mi
