= Jackson County Early College =

Public school in Sylva, North Carolina, US

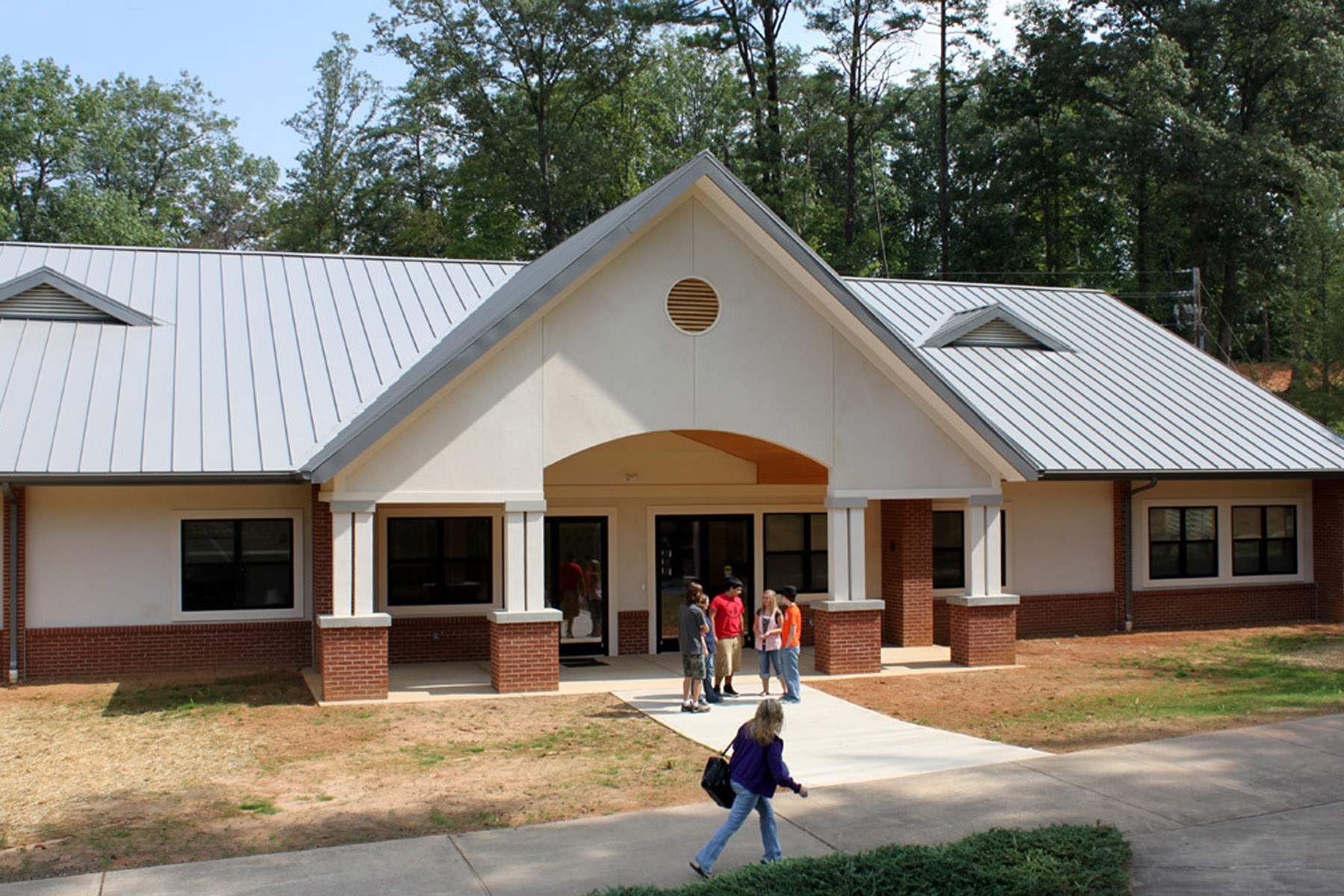
- Jackson County Early College's classroom facility

Location
- 404 College Drive; Sylva, North Carolina 28779; United States; 35°20′55″N 83°12′31″W

Information
- School type: Public
- Established: 2008 (18 years ago)
- School district: Jackson County Public Schools
- CEEB code: 343903
- Principal: Evelyn Graning
- Faculty: 4.00 (FTE)
- Enrollment: 109 (2023–2024)
- Student to teacher ratio: 27.25
- Campus type: Rural
- Colors: Teal and black
- Mascot: Jaguar
- Website: jcec.jcpsnc.org

Jackson County Early College is a public high school located in Sylva, North Carolina. It opened as an alternative to Smoky Mountain High School in 2008 for those students willing to put in extra work to also earn a community college 2-year degree along with their high school diploma. Jackson County Early College is a part of the Jackson County School System. Although it is a separate school, students are able to participate in Smoky Mountain Extracurricular activities, such as Marching Band, Indoor Percussion, Jazz Band, and some Clubs. It was originally located in Oaks Hall on the Southwestern Community College Campus in Webster, North Carolina, where quarters were tight due to the increasing enrollment of the Early College, but it moved in the Fall of 2010 to a building built by the county for the student's High School Classes. This has also allowed for the ability of the enrollment to exceed 100. Jackson County Early College currently has an "A" rating.

== See also ==
- Smoky Mountain High School
