= Smoky Mountain High School =

School in Sylva, North Carolina

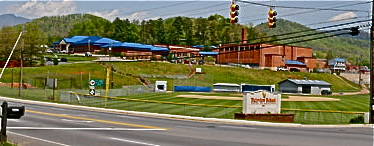
- Smoky Mountain High School from NC 107

Location
- 100 Smoky Mountain Drive; Sylva, North Carolina 28779; United States; 35°21′13″N 83°11′59″W

Information
- School type: Public secondary school
- Motto: "Locally grown, globally prepared"
- Established: 1960 (Sylva-Webster High School); 1988 (Smoky Mountain High School)
- School district: Jackson County Public Schools
- CEEB code: 343904
- Principal: Evelyn Graning
- Teaching staff: 53.87 (FTE)
- Enrollment: 899 (2023–2024)
- Student to teacher ratio: 16.69
- Campus type: Rural
- Colors: Blue and silver
- Mascot: Mustangs
- Website: smh.jcpsnc.org

Smoky Mountain High School is a public high school located in Sylva, North Carolina. The school formed as a result of the consolidation of the former Sylva-Webster High School and Cullowhee High School in 1988 at the Sylva-Webster campus, which dates back to 1960.

Smoky Mountain High School is a part of the Jackson County School System. It is the only 9–12 high school in the county. The other schools with grades 9–12 are Blue Ridge School, a K–12th grade school, in Cashiers, North Carolina and Jackson County Early College, with grades 9–13 on the Southwestern Community College Campus.

== Buildings on the SMHS campus ==
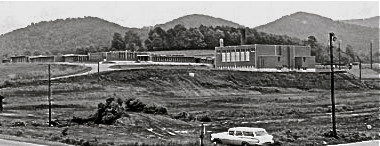
Former Sylva-Webster High School, now Smoky Mountain, when it was brand new in 1960

The buildings have different uses. A Building contains the cafeteria, commons, lobby, library, front office, guidance rooms, and many classrooms, as well as the former auditorium, now used as a chorus room. B Building houses many classrooms and the art room. The Gym/Band Building houses locker rooms as well as a gymnasium, band room, and storage/mechanical areas. It formerly housed the boiler for the school, the chimney for which still stands, although chimney swifts have taken up residence in it. C Building has the new science wing completed in 2006, as well as many classrooms. D and E Buildings house vocational shops.

The buildings have gone through many renovations since three of them opened as Sylva-Webster High School in 1960, the A Building (1960) had the lobby, cafeteria, and front office completely redone in 2004, with many smaller additions dating to before that time; B Building (1960) is now attached to C Building (1989) through an addition constructed in 2006 with a ramp to join the two buildings on the slightly hillside campus. D Building (1978), originally on its own with a long covered walkway connecting it to the original A and B buildings, now sits between C Building and E Building, constructed in 2004. The Gym/Band Room Building (1960) had a new, larger band room built onto it in the 1970s and in 2004, the large, tall gym windows were replaced with brick and smaller windows.

They built an auditorium and new gym in 2013. It also closed during the 2019–2020 coronavirus pandemic at the order of Governor Roy Cooper, but was re-opened in August 2020 to commence the start of the 2020–2021 school year. As of September 2021, the school is listed as the #1 school in the state in COVID-19 safety protocols

== Accreditation ==
The school is accredited by the Southern Association of Colleges and Schools and by the North Carolina Department of Public Instruction.

== School history ==
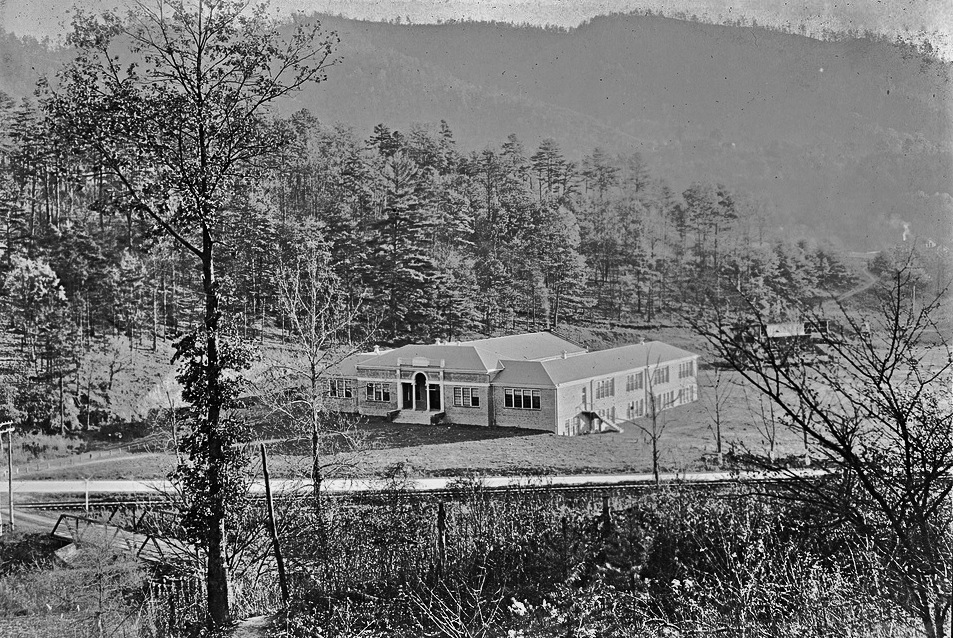
The old Sylva High School, built in 1924 and demolished in 1990

Smoky Mountain High School opened in 1988 at the old Sylva-Webster campus, and consolidated the smaller Cullowhee High School with the larger Sylva-Webster High School. At first the school was overcrowded because of the number of students, but that was shortly thereafter fixed by the addition of C Building, a two-story wing on the back of the high school. In 2004–2006, the high school added a new cafeteria, lobby, science building, vocational building, front office, and greenhouse, which resolved the problems associated with the growth of the student body since 1960.

Smoky Mountain High School achieved the Guinness World Record for "Most people hugging soft toys simultaneously," with 835 people simultaneously hugging stuffed animals.

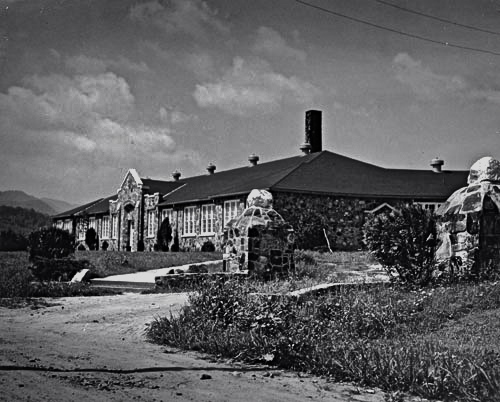
Webster Rock School, built by the WPA in 1936

=== Sylva-Webster High School ===
Sylva-Webster High School was built in 1959, opened in 1960, and was formed from the consolidation of two smaller high schools. The larger one, Sylva High School, opened in 1915 in a two-story frame building and moved to a larger, 8th–11th Grade Building in 1924 at the present location of Mark Watson Park, which was formerly a fairground. The building was known as the "Old Sylva School" when it closed and became part of nearby Sylva Elementary in 1960. Sylva Elementary had opened in 1929 and is one of the predecessors to Fairview School. Sylva Elementary School was demolished in 1974 and Sylva High School was demolished in 1990. All that remains is the old vocational shop building, which once served as the Jackson County Recreation Department, but is now condemned.

In 1979, Sylva-Webster High School marching band was the Grand Champion at the Bands of America National Championship.

The smaller school, Webster High School, opened in 1910 when Webster was still the county seat, in a newly built two story frame building. This building lasted until 1936, when the old Rock Webster School opened next door, and it was demolished in 1937. The new school housed all of Webster's schoolchildren and also the high school students from Savannah Township until 1960, after which it became an elementary school; it closed in 1974 when Fairview School opened. It still stands but the original windows and doors were removed and smaller ones took their places, and the old, tall ceilings are hidden under a drop in ceiling. It serves Southwestern Child Development Center, which is a free preschool, and the Jackson County Family Resources Center. Its gymnasium serves as a kind of community center.

=== Cullowhee High School ===
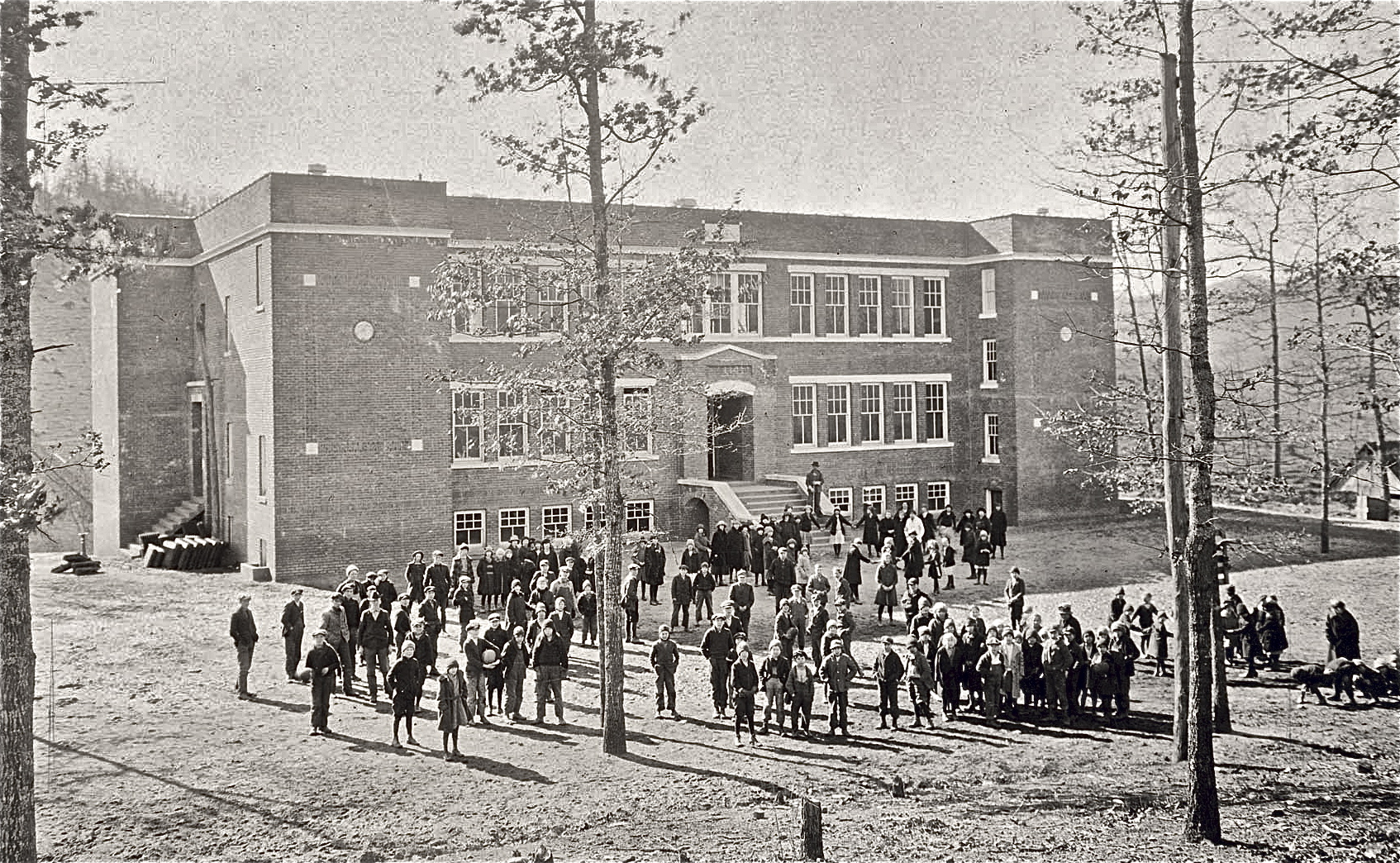
The 1923 Cullowhee School

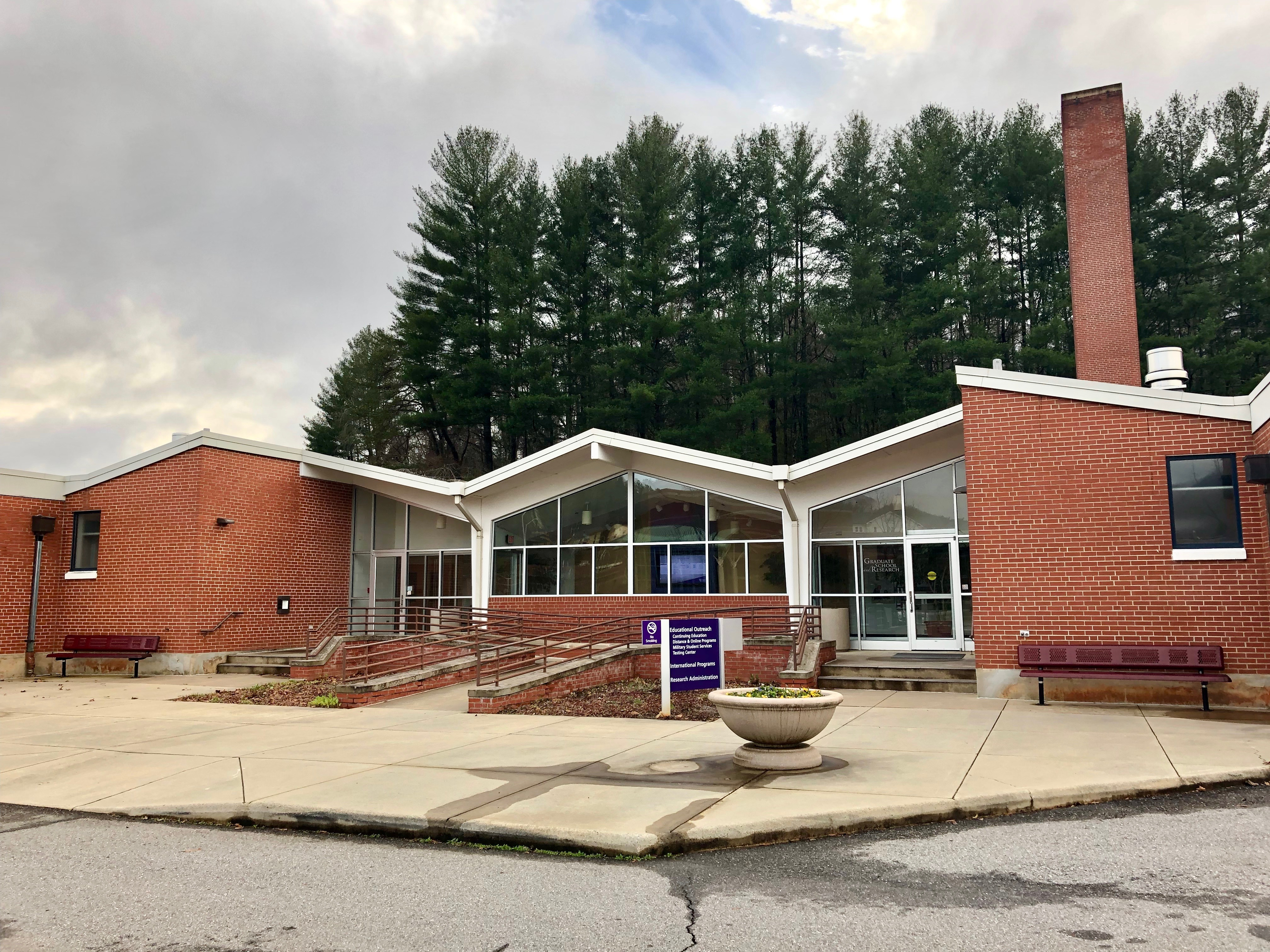
Camp Building, Western Carolina University (ex-Cordelia Camp Laboratory School)

Cullowhee High School was the first name of Western Carolina University, in nearby Cullowhee, but the high school separated from the university when an existing public school, dating to 1923 as Cullowhee School, had high school classrooms added in 1925. The building stood where Brown Cafeteria now stands, and was purchased in 1927 by the university, at which time it became Cullowhee Training School. The public school moved to the Gertrude McKee Training School in 1939, and then to the Cordelia Camp Laboratory School in 1964, where the high school program remained until 1988. Cordelia Camp Laboratory School closed in 1994 when the new K–8 Cullowhee Valley School opened. The building is now known as The Cordelia Camp Outreach Center, Camp Lab, or the Camp Building. By the time the high school closed, Camp Laboratory Elementary School was the only K–8 School left in the district. Cullowhee High School once had several multiple classroom elementary schools that fed into it, but the last one, Canada, which had opened in 1952, closed in 1982. The other major elementary schools were Johns Creek (Caney Fork Community, 1925–1965), East LaPorte (East LaPorte, 1925–1947), Tuckaseigee (Tuckasegee, 1948–1958), and Cowarts (1928–1951).

== Athletics ==
Smoky Mountain is a member of the North Carolina High School Athletic Association (NCHSAA) and is classified as a 5A school. The school is a part of the Mountain Eight 4A/5A Conference. The school's team name is the Mustangs, with the school colors being blue and silver.

Sports at Smoky Mountain include: baseball, basketball, cheerleading, cross country, football, golf, soccer, softball, swimming, tennis, track & field, volleyball, and wrestling.

The women's basketball team won the NCHSAA 2A state championship in 2007. The volleyball team won three straight NCHSAA 3A state championships in 1991, 1992, and 1993.

== Notable alumni ==
- Katie Herzog, journalist, author and podcast host
- Zebby Matthews, MLB pitcher for the Minnesota Twins
- Cal Raleigh, MLB catcher for the Seattle Mariners, All-Star selection in 2025
- Carrie Stroup, TV host, model, and beauty pageant titleholder

== See also ==
Jackson County Early College
