= Savannah, North Carolina =

- Unincorporated community
- Location within North Carolina Location within the United States
- Coordinates: 35°19′09″N 83°15′46″W
- Country: United States
- State: North Carolina
- County: Jackson
- Elevation: 2,483 ft (757 m)
- Time zone: UTC-5 (Eastern (EST))
  - Summer (DST): UTC-4 (EDT)
- Area code: 828
- GNIS feature ID: 996296

Savannah is an unincorporated community in Jackson County, North Carolina, United States. Savannah is located along North Carolina Highway 116 and US 441, south of Dillsboro and southeast of Webster. It has its own fire department, a community center, businesses lining US 441 and NC 116, and little else except homes.

== History ==
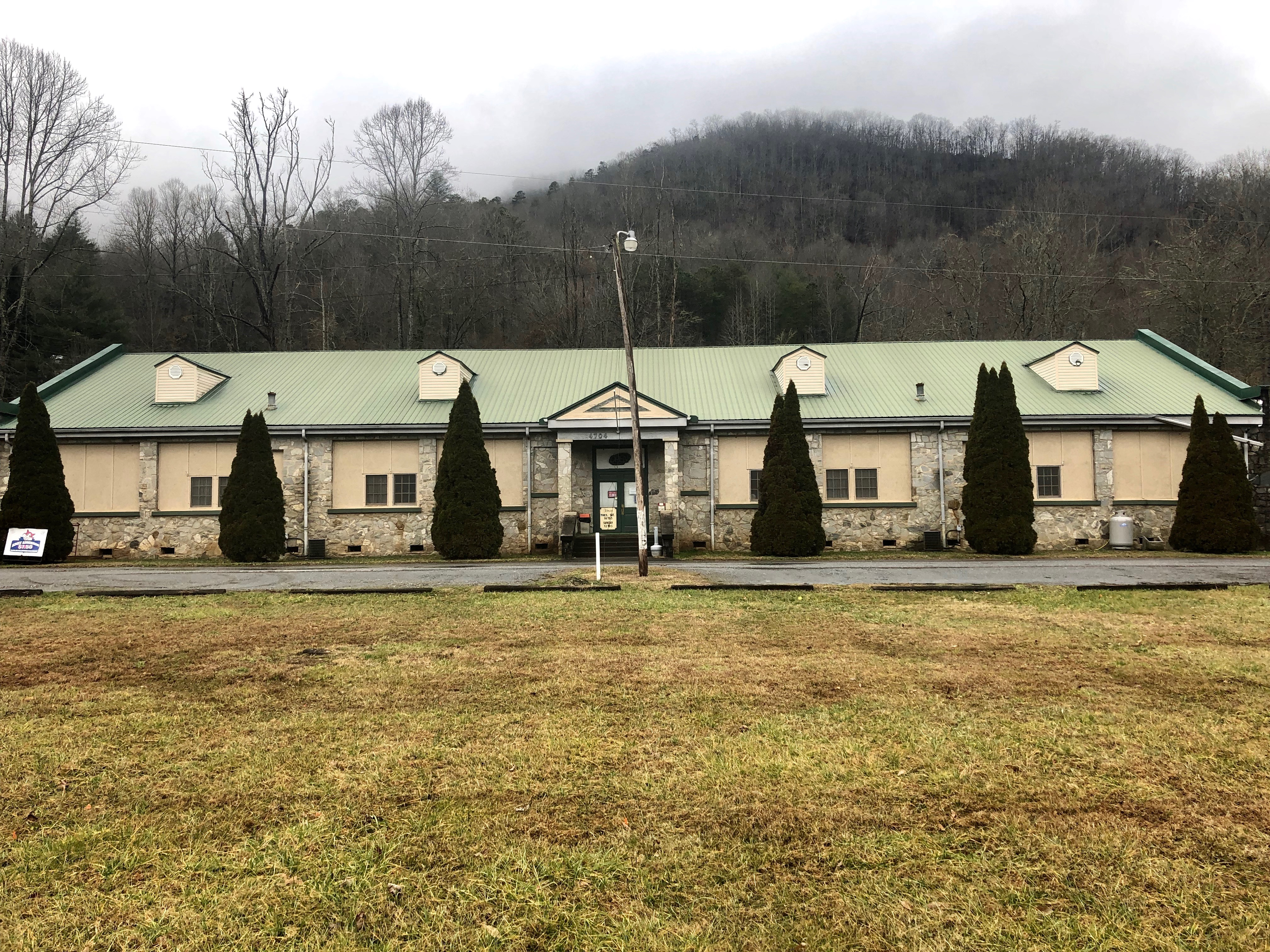
The former Savannah Consolidated School

Savannah Township was originally settled after the Indian Removal Act of 1830. The first settlers in the area were homesteaders, and they built their farmsteads in the valley and hills located in the area. The area has several cemeteries and churches, the origins of which go back to this period of time. The present church buildings are much more modern than the originals, though. The valley was formed over millions of years by the erosive power of Savannah Creek, which flows north-west, following the course of US 441 and later NC 116 before emptying into the Tuckasegee River near Webster. The area was home to several small communities, some with their own school, store, community center, and post office. Greens Creek, Gay, Viewpoint, Olivet, and East Fork were the five communities that made up Savannah. In the 1920s, new schools at Greens Creek and Gay opened, consolidating three one-room schools in each community. The 1920s also led to the opening up of the Savannah Communities to the outside world, via the two-lane paved US 441 built during the decade, near the present five-lane road. US 441 was a modern two-lane and paved highway from Franklin to Dillsboro at the time. The 1920s also exposed the inequality that existed between rural schools and the town schools, it was said in the Jackson County Journal, May 9, 1924 Issue "Sylva Students complete the 7th Grade at age 13, Savannah students complete the 7th Grade at 15 years of age. The only children that can complete a grade a year are those who live in the wealthy districts where it is possible to maintain an eight-month term. Only 45% of the children in the county can had the benefit of a term of eight months. The children in the schools with a shorter term must spend one to two years more in the Elementary School than they should. The result of this is that hundreds of boys and girls drop out of school before they graduate Elementary School. If they manage to complete Elementary School, they are so over age and handicapped that more than half of them drop out before completing their first year of high school." This was partially fixed in 1936, with the opening of the old Webster Rock School and fixed once and for all when a consolidated school for the Greens Creek & Savannah Townships opened in 1940, the grades 1–7 school was named Savannah Consolidated School. It was a seven-classroom school with a lunchroom and a gym/auditorium. For the first time ever, students in the Savannah Township could enjoy modern conveniences, such as electric lights, indoor restrooms, and a very modern building. But the school wasn't without its problems. It was overcrowded from the start, due to the unanticipated level of students attending it because they had been attending school in Webster, Sylva, or Dillsboro, due to the better buildings there before 1940. The School was still a great building, and it didn't absolutely require expansion until 1955. In 1955, four new classrooms and a new set of restrooms, as well as a water tower on top of the red-brick flat-roof addition was added to the school, easing overcrowding and allowing expansion of the lunch room and raising the number of classrooms to 10. The school served around 300 students until it closed due to consolidation in 1973. Since that time, it has been converted to an Antique Mall with boards covering much of the windows.

In 1955, the roadway between Gold City on top of Cowee Mountain and Dillsboro was widened, realigned, and regraded to a straighter 2-lane format. Road cuts were added, and the road remained in this form until the 1970s, when it was straightened even more and expanded to be 5 lanes. Parts of the 1950s and 1920s roads still exist as side roads, but like the old US 19/23 through the Scotts Creek and Sylva Townships, it has been cut off in multiple places by the newer highway. Several one-lane concrete bridges still exist from the 1920s roadway, and the present highway retains much of the alignment of the 1950s roadway. Savannah Township has had its own fire department since the 1980s, and has a community center, several businesses lining the highway, and many nurseries in the area. The area also has spectacular mountain scenery visible from the Highway, and is home to the Victory Baptist Church & Christian School. Many churches are in the Savannah area, as well as some natural and manmade treasures that grace the community, including a waterfall and a 1930s See Rock City Barn facing the Highway. Savannah isn't quite what it once was, but it is still a very living rural community.
