= Church of the Good Shepherd (Cashiers, North Carolina) =

Historic church in North Carolina, United States

- U.S. National Register of Historic Places
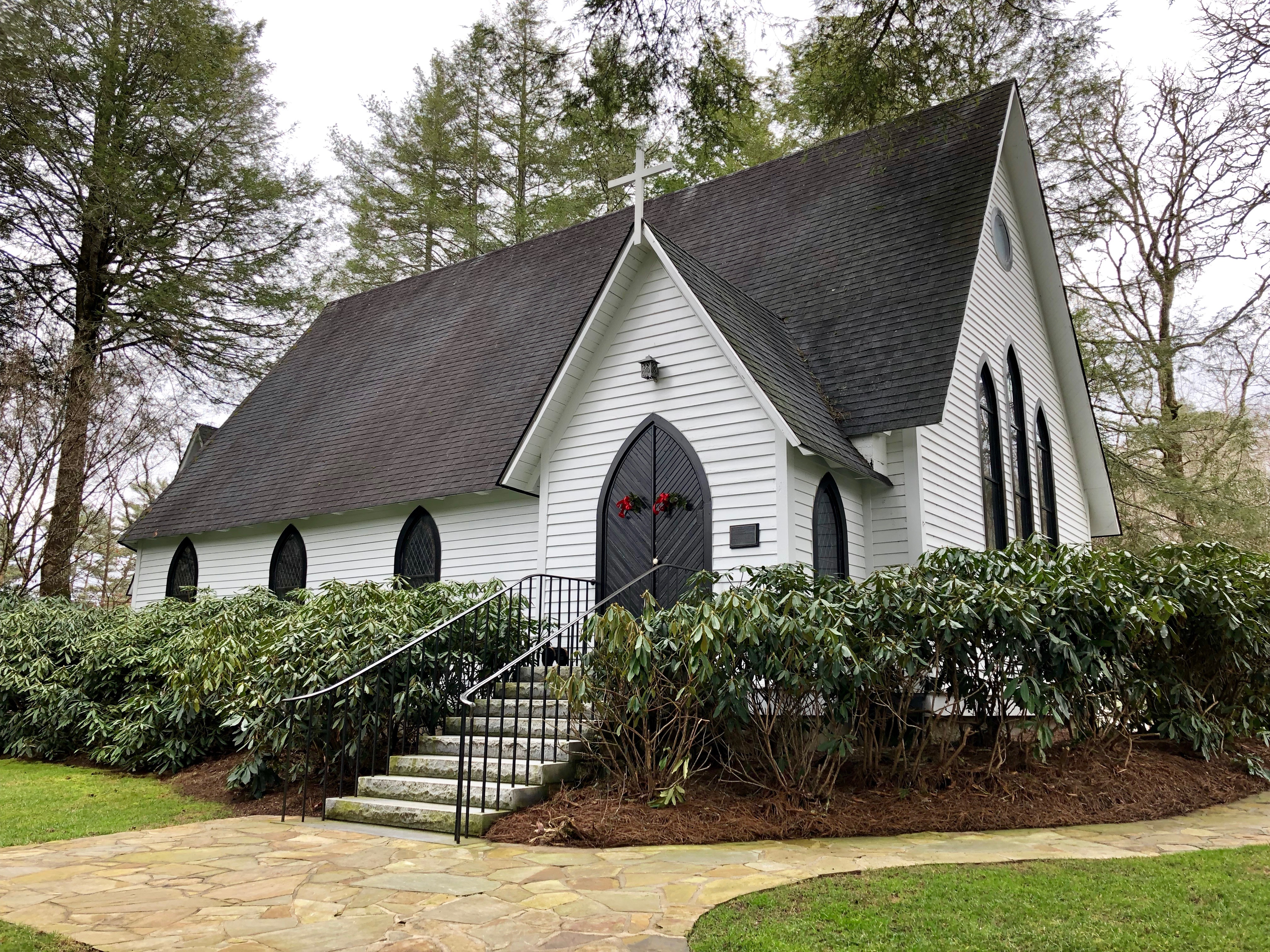
- Church Of The Good Shepherd Cashiers, January 2019

- Location within North Carolina Location within the United States
- Location: NC 107 at SR 1118, Cashiers, North Carolina
- Coordinates: 35°5′49″N 83°5′7″W
- Area: 1 acre (0.40 ha)
- Built: 1895
- Architectural style: Gothic
- NRHP reference No.: 86000317
- Added to NRHP: February 20, 1986

The Church of the Good Shepherd is a historic Episcopal church located at 1448 Highway 107 South in Cashiers, Jackson County, North Carolina. The church reported 592 members in 2015 and 148 members in 2023; no membership statistics were reported in 2024 parochial reports. Plate and pledge income reported for the congregation in 2024 was $952,577. Average Sunday attendance (ASA) in 2024 was 137 persons.

The church was built about 1895, and is a Gothic Revival style rectangular frame church. It is sheathed in weatherboard and has a steeply pitched roof. It features three lancet windows and a bell tower with a pyramidal roof. On February 20, 1986, it was added to the National Register of Historic Places.

== Current use ==
The rector is the Rev. Rob Wood.
