= Fairfield Inn (Cashiers, North Carolina) =

- U.S. National Register of Historic Places
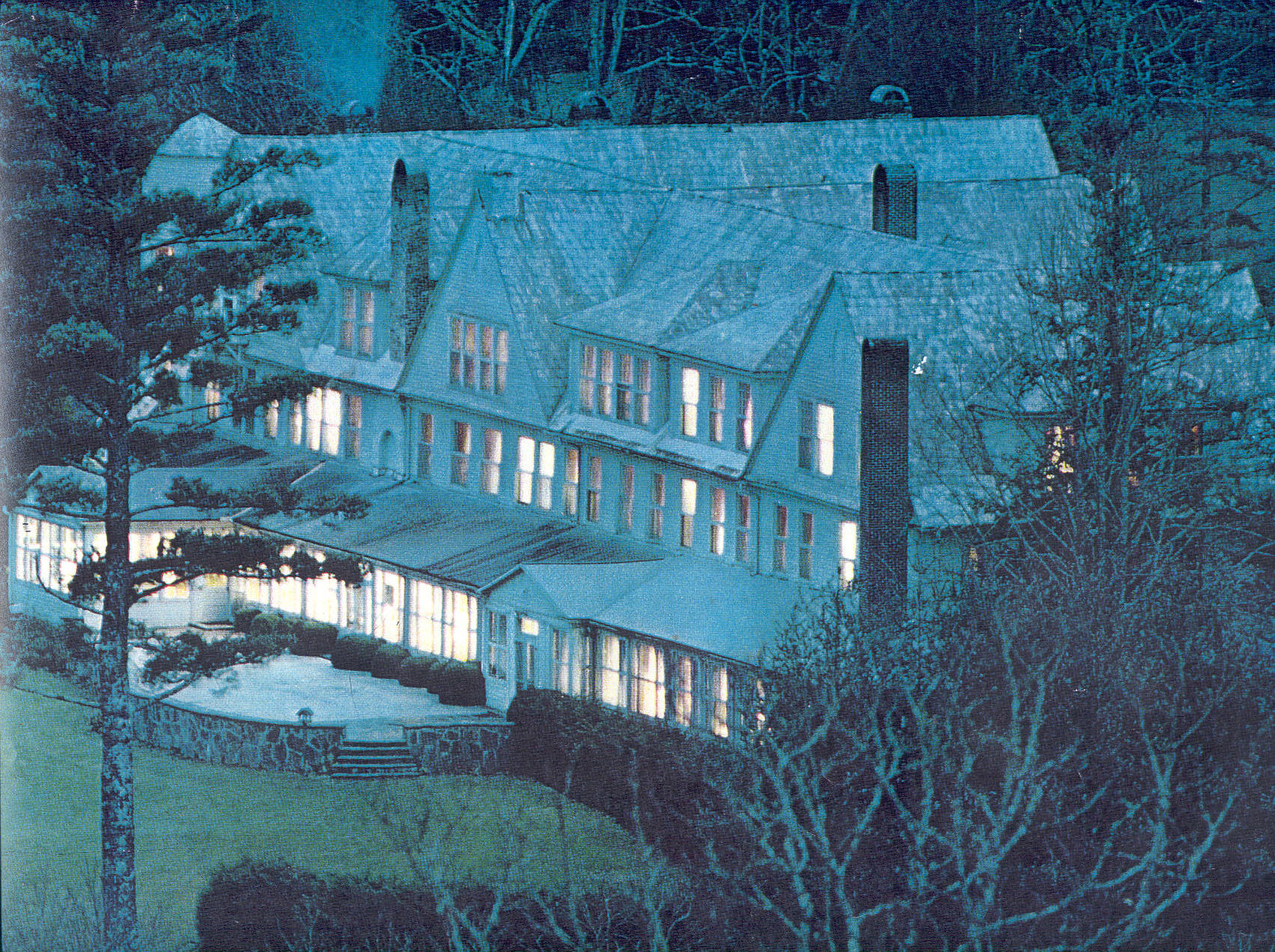
- Fairfield Inn as it looked around 1980

- Location within North Carolina Location within the United States
- Location: US 64 East, Cashiers, North Carolina
- Coordinates: 35°7′28″N 83°2′36″W
- Area: 5 acres (2.0 ha)
- Built: 1896-1898
- Built by: Toxaway Company
- Architectural style: Queen Anne
- NRHP reference No.: 82003476
- Added to NRHP: June 14, 1982

The Fairfield Inn was an historic hotel building located on Fairfield Lake near US Highway 64 in Cashiers, Jackson County, North Carolina. It was built in 1896-1898, and consisted of a 2 1/2-story main block with two rear wings. The Queen Anne style frame building featured three massive singled gables, hipped dormers, a three-story corner turret, elliptical windows, and a one-story lakeside verandah. The hotel had 100 rooms.

In July, 1982, it was added to the National Register of Historic Places.

== Current use ==
The building was originally built in 1896 near a former gold mine on Lake Fairfield and added to in the early 1900s. It stood on Lake Fairfield near US 64 until 1986. Never renovated, a fire in 1986 exposed the fact the hotel was unsafe and it was demolished later that year.

== See also ==
- National Register of Historic Places listings in Jackson County, North Carolina
