= Tuckasegee, North Carolina =

- Unincorporated community
- Location within North Carolina Location within the United States
- Coordinates: 35°16′13″N 83°07′22″W
- Country: United States
- State: North Carolina
- County: Jackson
- Elevation: 2,165 ft (660 m)
- Time zone: UTC-5 (Eastern (EST))
  - Summer (DST): UTC-4 (EDT)
- ZIP code: 28783
- Area code: 828
- GNIS feature ID: 996296

Tuckasegee (Cherokee: ᏛᎧᏏᎩ, romanized: Dvkasigi), named after the historic Cherokee town of that name located near here, is an unincorporated community in Jackson County, North Carolina, United States. It followed the earlier Cherokee town as developing on the upper Tuckaseegee River, at the confluence of its East and West forks.

Today North Carolina Highway 107 and North Carolina Highway 281 intersect at this community, southeast of Forest Hills. Tuckasegee has its own post office and a couple of gas stations/convenience stores. The rest of the community has residences.

== History ==
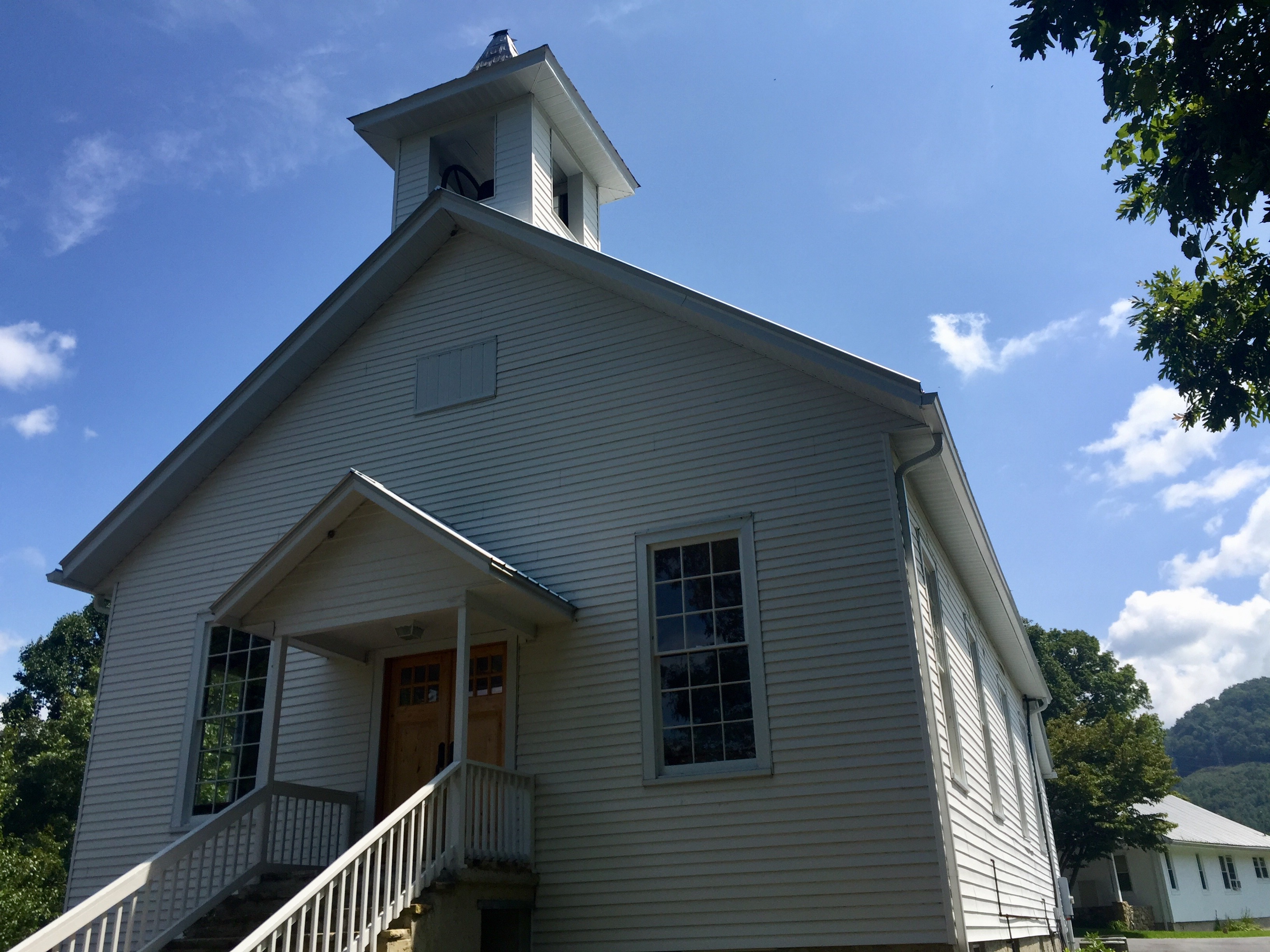
Tuckasegee Wesleyan Church (c. 1900)

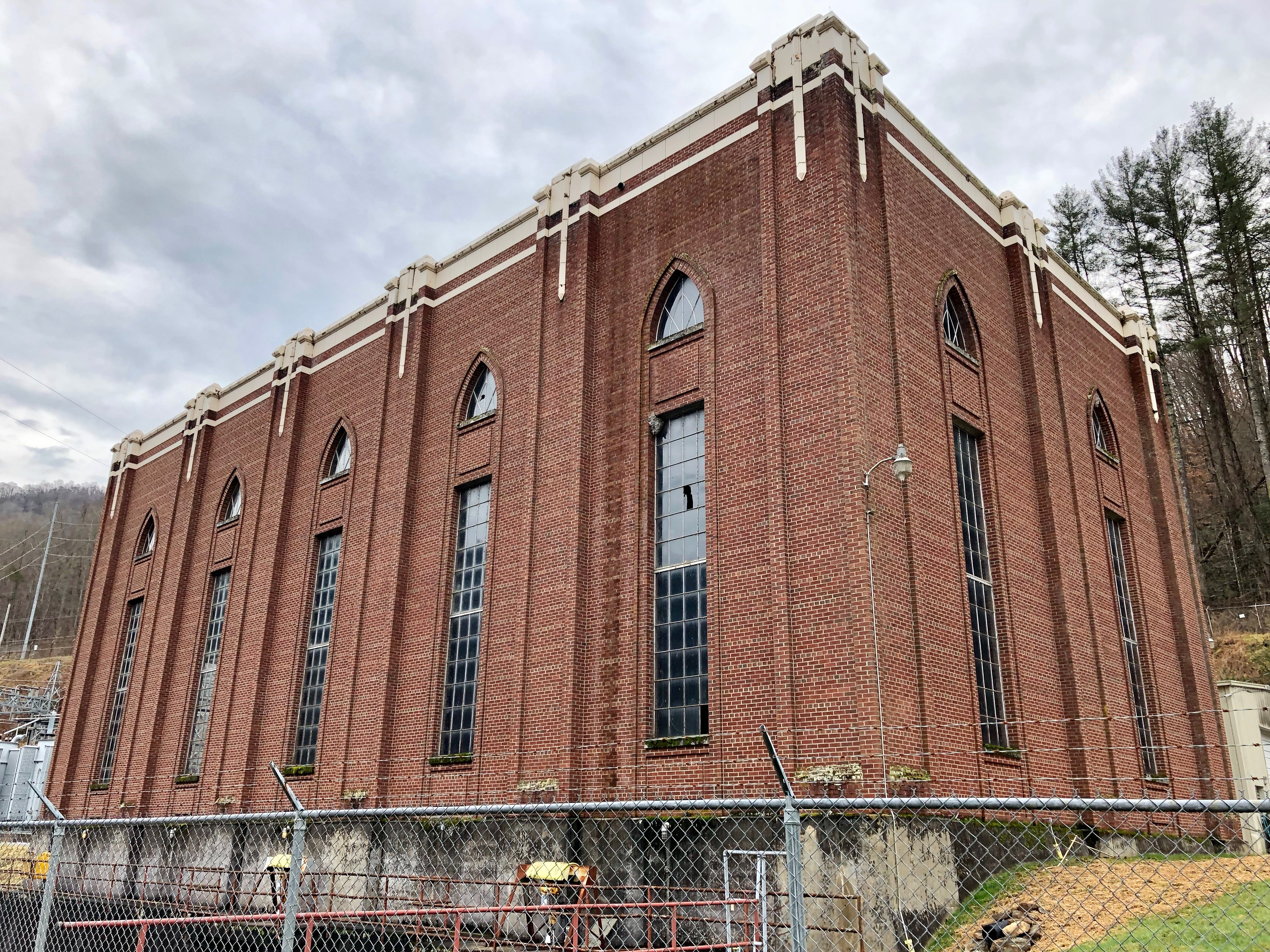
Lake Glenville Powerhouse (1941) an Art Deco-style structure located in Upper Tuckasegee along NC 107

This area was part of the Cherokee homelands and had been inhabited for thousands of years by ancestral indigenous peoples. Numerous Cherokee towns developed along the Tuckasegee River, including their ancient "mother town" of Kituwa, believed to have been their original settlement (it is located downriver in present-day Swain County).

The historic Cherokee town of Tuckasegee was shown on George Hunter's Map of 1730, prepared when he was Surveyor General of South Carolina. There it was spelled as "Tucosegee".

At the beginning of the American Revolutionary War, Tuckasegee and most Cherokee towns in this area were destroyed by militias raised by the colonies of Virginia, North and South Carolina, and Georgia, beginning in September 1776. The Rutherford Light horse expedition had forces that attacked Cherokee towns on both sides of the mountains, because they had allied with the British. The Cherokee had hoped to expel European Americans from their territory.

Tuckasegee was rebuilt and occupied again by the Cherokee before they were forced to cede it. European Americans eventually moved into this area in the nineteenth century.

=== 20th century to present ===
The European-American community of Tuckasegee has historically been flood-prone because of its location at the confluence of forks of the river. Since the 1930s, dams have been built on upper portions of each fork of the river to provide flood control. Several manmade lakes were formed above the dams after their construction: Wolf, Tanasee Creek, Bear, and Cedar Cliff lakes are on the East Fork, and Glenville Lake is on the West Fork of the Tuckaseegee River.

The community once had access to two schools: Canada Elementary was a K-8 School, built in 1952 in Little Canada, and closed in 1982. The other was in Tuckasegee: Tuckasegee School, a combination Elementary and High School, was built in the 1940s after a fire destroyed the original early 1900s structure. It closed in 1958. Students in Little Canada and Upper Tuckasegee must now make a minimum 45-minute bus ride to attend Cullowhee Valley School in Cullowhee. Car trips to either Sylva, the county seat, or Cullowhee are similar in length.

Bear Lake Reserve is an exclusive housing development along Bear Lake in Little Canada. The area has recreation opportunities for boating, rafting, hiking, and mountain climbing. The community opposes other development of the valley. It was largely cultivated for farmland since being settled by European Americans in the 1800s. The area once had a couple of logging towns, one in the Rock Bridge area of Little Canada and another in East LaPorte. East LaPorte had a school until 1947; its post office closed in 1955. The logging towns are largely gone, with little trace remaining.

Tuckasegee has several historic mountain churches established by early European-American settlers, including the Tuckasegee Wesleyan Church and the East LaPorte Community Church. The Minnie Stephens Log House is reportedly the first house built by European Americans in the county. The Caney Fork, East LaPorte, Cowarts, Little Canada, Shook Cove, and Bear Lake communities make up Tuckasegee, as they are all in the general area around the unincorporated place and use the Tuckasegee Post Office.

== See also ==
National Register of Historic Places listings in Jackson County, North Carolina
