= Mordecai Zachary House =

Historic house in North Carolina, United States

- U.S. National Register of Historic Places
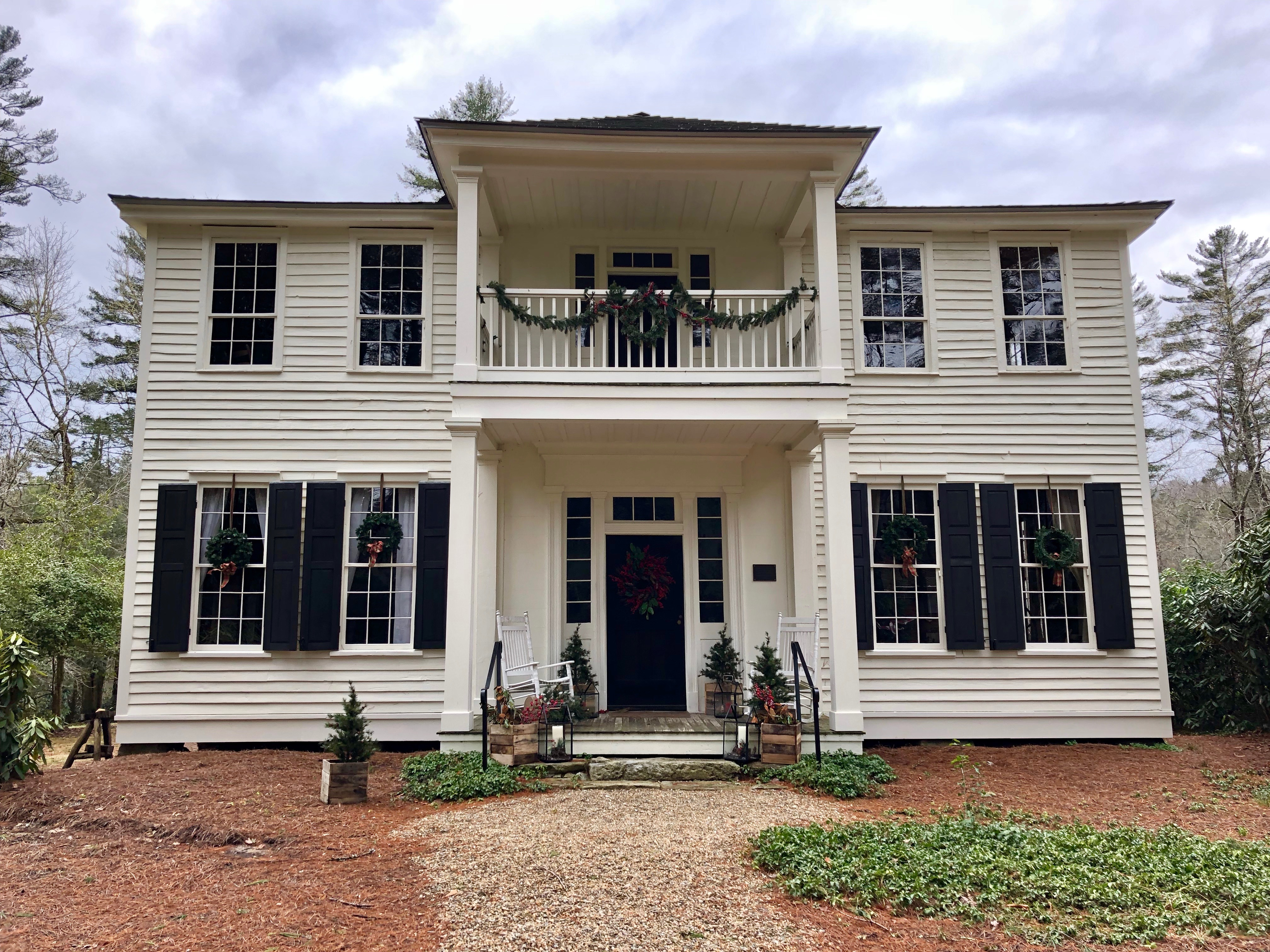
- Mordecai Zachary (Zachary-Tolbert) House

- Location within North Carolina Location within the United States
- Location: NC 107, 0.2 miles S of NC 1107, Cashiers, North Carolina
- Coordinates: 35°5′28″N 83°4′51″W
- Area: 5.2 acres (2.1 ha)
- Built: 1850-1852
- Built by: Zachary, Mordecai
- Architectural style: Greek Revival
- NRHP reference No.: 98001575
- Added to NRHP: December 31, 1998

The Zachary-Tolbert House, also known as the Mordecai Zachary House, is a restored pre-American Civil War house located at Cashiers, Jackson County, North Carolina. The house was built between 1850 and 1852, and is a two-story, five bay Greek Revival style frame dwelling. It has a low hipped roof and central front, two-story, portico. A frame two-room kitchen was added to the rear elevation and was connected to the house by a covered breezeway in the 1920s.

It was listed on the National Register of Historic Places in December 1998.

The house is owned by the Cashiers Historical Society and operated as a historic house museum that features a collection of hand-crafted ‘plain-style’ furniture.

== See also ==
- National Register of Historic Places listings in Jackson County, North Carolina
