= Blue Ridge School (North Carolina) =

American public primary school in North Carolina

Location
- 95 Bobcat Drive; Cashiers, North Carolina 28717-9998; United States; 35°07′46″N 83°07′14″W

Information
- Type: Public primary school
- Established: 1975; 51 years ago
- School district: Jackson County Public Schools
- NCES District ID: 3702340
- School code: NC-500-316
- NCES School ID: 370234001001
- Principal: Kheri Cowan
- Teaching staff: 11.38 (on an FTE basis)
- Grades: PK-6
- Enrollment: 149 (2023-2024)
- Student to teacher ratio: 13.09
- Campus type: Rural: Distant
- Colors: Green and gold
- Athletics conference: Smoky Mountain Conference
- Nickname: Bobcats
- Website: brs.jcpsnc.org

Blue Ridge School is a public primary school located in Cashiers, North Carolina and is part of the Jackson County Public Schools System. It is the smallest school in the district and resulted from consolidating the larger Glenville Elementary and High School and the smaller Cashiers Elementary School in 1975. The building consists of three 100' diameter round "pods," which have no permanent partitions, with one hallway for each radiating into a central pod that houses a lobby and the school's front offices. The school is very similar to Fairview Elementary School in Sylva. Still, Blue Ridge is smaller than Fairview, with no stage, and the library is not in a pod. The same site also houses the Blue Ridge Early College, with grades 7-12 in two detached classroom buildings.

The school serves the towns of Cashiers and Glenville as well as the communities of Sapphire, Fairfield, and Whiteside Cove with public education.

== Notable alumni ==
- Spencer Fisher, former UFC fighter
