= Gay, North Carolina =

- Unincorporated community
- Location within North Carolina Location within the United States
- Coordinates: 35°17′29″N 83°16′24″W
- Country: United States
- State: North Carolina
- County: Jackson
- Elevation: 2,303 ft (702 m)
- Time zone: UTC-5 (Eastern (EST))
  - Summer (DST): UTC-4 (EDT)
- Area code: 828
- GNIS feature ID: 1011456

Gay is an unincorporated community in Jackson County, North Carolina, United States.

== History ==
A post office was established at Gay in 1907, and remained in operation until it was discontinued in 1953. The community has the name of Gay Sutton, a pioneer citizen.
