= Glenville, North Carolina =

- Census-designated place
- Location within North Carolina Location within the United States
- Coordinates: 35°10′19″N 83°07′38″W
- Country: United States
- State: North Carolina
- County: Jackson
- Incorporated: 1891 (inactive)

Area
  - Total: 1.34 sq mi (3.48 km^{2})
  - Land: 1.34 sq mi (3.46 km^{2})
  - Water: 0.0077 sq mi (0.02 km^{2})
- Elevation: 3,612 ft (1,101 m)

Population (2020)
  - Total: 155
  - Density: 115.9/sq mi (44.74/km^{2})
- Time zone: UTC-5 (Eastern (EST))
  - Summer (DST): UTC-4 (EDT)
- ZIP code: 28736
- FIPS code: 37-26520
- GNIS feature ID: 2628628

Glenville is an unincorporated community and census-designated place (CDP) in Jackson County, North Carolina, United States. It is now a popular lakeside vacation community with many second homes that sometimes are rented around Lake Glenville, which flooded and destroyed the original town. As of the 2020 census, Glenville had a population of 155.

== Demographics ==
Historical population
| Census | Pop. | Note | %± |
|---|---|---|---|
| 2020 | 155 | | — |
U.S. Decennial Census

== Geography ==
Glenville is in south-central Jackson County. It is on the east side of Lake Glenville (formerly Thorpe Lake), a reservoir on the West Fork of the Tuckasegee River. North Carolina Highway 107 passes through the community, leading north (downriver) 16 miles (26 km) to Cullowhee and south 5 miles (8 km) to Cashiers.

According to the U.S. Census Bureau, the Glenville CDP has a total area of 1.4 square miles (3.5 km^{2}), of which 0.01 square miles (0.02 km^{2}), or 0.46%, are water.

== History ==
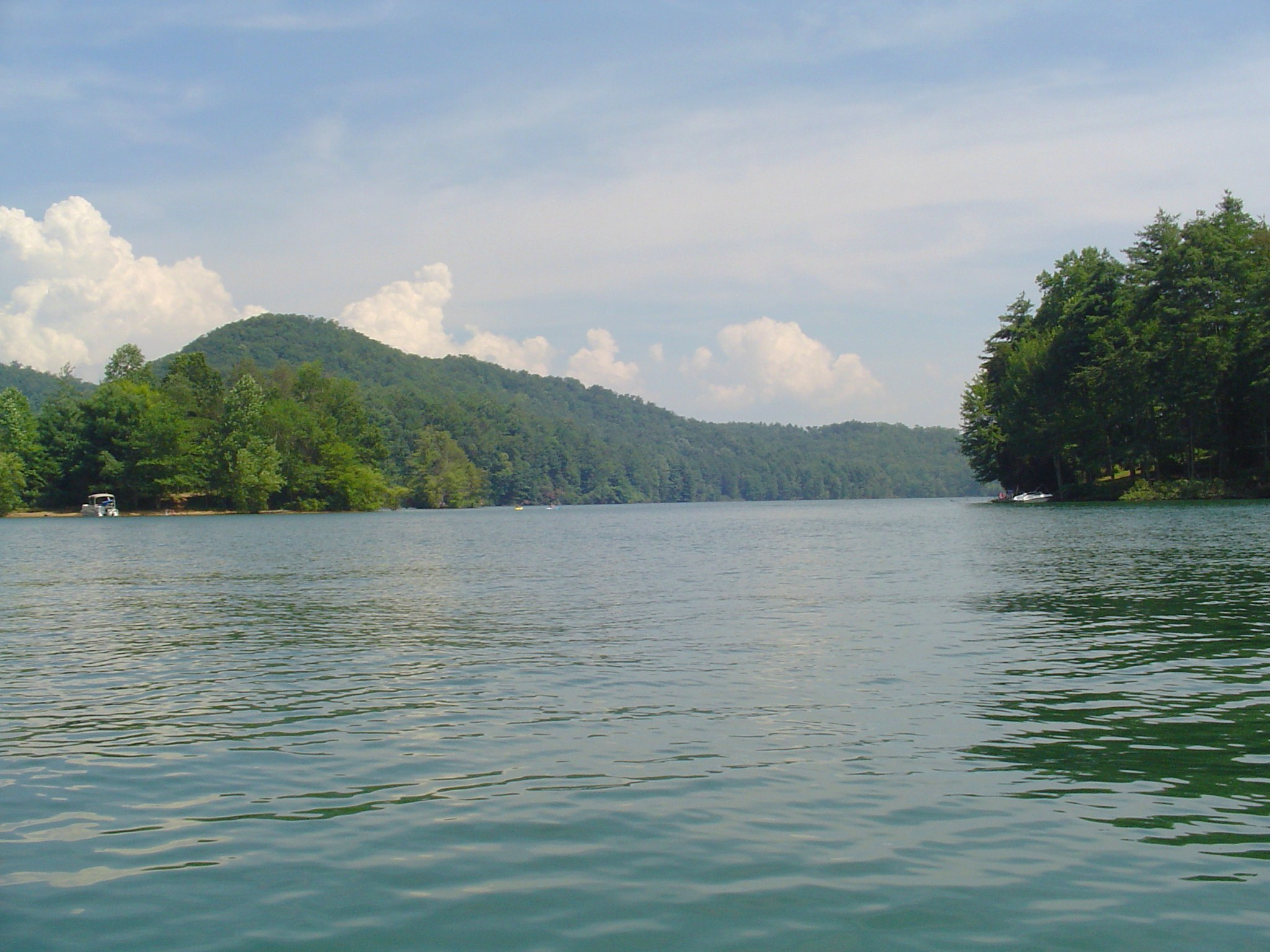
Lake Glenville

Prior to incorporation in 1891, it was named "Hamburgh" and later "Hamburg", from which the township gets its name. The Hamburgh post office was established there in 1856, but settlement began at least as early as 1827. It was used as a fort in case of attack from the local Cherokee people. At the time of incorporation in 1891, it was the largest town in Jackson County. The town had a private high school, the first in Jackson County, formed in 1886 and was just like Cullowhee High School, founded in 1889, which has now become Western Carolina University. The Glenville school became a public institution in 1891. In 1926, a new Glenville School was built on a hill above the town, with grades 1–11. It was the main high school for that part of the county until 1975, when Blue Ridge School opened, consolidating Cashiers Elementary and Glenville School. When the lake was filled in the 1940s, the waters were brought to the edge of the campus, making the school lakeside. It was the pride of the community but deteriorated after being abandoned and was demolished around 2000 to make way for lakeside homes. The town managed to save its church and graveyard from the lake, and they were moved not far beyond the present shoreline; today they rest lakeside.

The original town was destroyed in 1941 by Nantahala Power and Light after it built a hydroelectric dam, forming Lake Glenville on the Tuckasegee River. The area next to the lake is still called Glenville, however, and has United States Postal Service ZIP Code 28736, assigned mostly to the many vacation homes now built around the lake. The area is now a popular tourist and second home destination, and the lake has many multimillion-dollar homes around it.

Lake Glenville is renowned for bass fishing and annually hosts bass fishing tournaments. Smallmouth bass live abundantly in Lake Glenville, as well do lake trout, crappie, largemouth bass, bream, and perch species. Certain species of catfish also live in the lake, mainly "channel cats". There are numerous creeks that produce the water for Lake Glenville, including Cedar creek (Cedar Creek and Bee Tree Creek combined), Mill Creek, Hurricane Creek, and Pine Creek, as well as other natural springs consumed at the base of the lake. Lake Glenville is the highest reservoir east of the Mississippi, with a surface elevation of 3,492 feet (1,064 m). The majority of higher income seasonal residents are from Florida or Georgia. It is a popular area due to families seeking refuge from the summer heat of the South. The average summer temperature in Glenville is approximately 83 °F (28 °C). This is much lower than the average summer temperatures in the surrounding 100 miles.

The town made news in 2014 when Lucy Morgan, who had retired to Glenville, exposed a $49.6 million mortgage fraud/Ponzi scheme being run by developer Domenico Rabuffo while he was in the United States Federal Witness Protection Program. It was the subject of the American Greed episode "Goodfella Gone Bad".
