= Lake Glenville =

- Thorpe Reservoir
- Location within North Carolina Location within the United States
- Location: Jackson County, North Carolina, United States
- Coordinates: 35°11′46″N 083°09′11″W
- Type: reservoir
- Basin countries: United States
- Surface area: 1,470 acres (5.9 km^{2})
- Max. depth: more than 130 ft (40 m)
- Shore length^{1}: 26 mi (42 km)
- Surface elevation: 3,494 ft (1,065 m)
- Settlements: Cashiers, Glenville
- ^{1} Shore length is not a well-defined measure.

Lake Glenville is a reservoir located eight miles from Cashiers, North Carolina to the dam and public beach. The headwaters, at Hurricane Creek, are less than two miles. It was formed by the damming of the west fork of the Tuckasegee River in 1941. Between 1951 and 2002, it was officially known as "Thorpe Reservoir" after J. E. S. Thorpe, Nantahala Power's first president. It is still listed as such on many maps. The lake bottom plunges as steeply as the mountains that meet the shore. The depth a short distance from the water's edge may register 80 feet (24 m) or more. The lake has 26 miles (42 km) of shoreline and encompasses 1,470 total acres. It is a twenty-minute drive from Western Carolina University, and the town of Sylva.

== History ==
During World War II, ALCOA (Aluminum Company of America) needed more electricity to make aluminum for the war effort. In June 1940, Nantahala Power and Light, then owned by ALCOA, began constructing a dam to generate hydroelectric power on the west fork of the Tuckasegee River at Onion Falls. They completed it in late 1941, filling a new lake called Thorpe Reservoir or (present-day) Lake Glenville behind the dam. It encompassed the entire valley north of Cashiers. The town of Hamburg was evacuated and flooded, covering schools, homes, businesses, and farmlands.
