= Forest Hills, North Carolina =

- Village
- Location within North Carolina Location within the United States
- Coordinates: 35°17′45″N 83°11′44″W
- Country: United States
- State: North Carolina
- County: Jackson

Government
  - Mayor: Marcia Almond

Area
  - Total: 0.49 sq mi (1.28 km^{2})
  - Land: 0.49 sq mi (1.28 km^{2})
  - Water: 0 sq mi (0.00 km^{2})
- Elevation: 2,251 ft (686 m)

Population (2020)
  - Total: 303
  - Density: 611.3/sq mi (236.02/km^{2})
- Time zone: UTC-5 (Eastern (EST))
  - Summer (DST): UTC-4 (EDT)
- ZIP code: 28723
- Area code: 828
- FIPS code: 37-24170
- GNIS feature ID: 1853435
- Website: www.villageofforesthills.org

Forest Hills is a village in Jackson County, North Carolina, United States. As of the 2020 census, Forest Hills had a population of 303. Formerly a neighborhood within nearby unincorporated Cullowhee, it became incorporated in 1997.

== Geography ==
According to the United States Census Bureau, the village has a total area of 0.5 square miles (1.3 km^{2}), all land.

== Demographics ==
Historical population
Census	Pop.	Note	%±
2000	330		—
2010	365		10.6%
2020	303		−17.0%
U.S. Decennial Census

As of the census of 2000, there were 330 people, 156 households, and 75 families residing in the village. The population density was 661.7 inhabitants per square mile (255.5/km^{2}). There were 182 housing units at an average density of 365.0 per square mile (140.9/km^{2}). The racial makeup of the village was 96.06% White, 2.42% African American, 0.30% Native American, 0.61% Asian, 0.30% from other races, and 0.30% from two or more races. Hispanic or Latino of any race were 1.21% of the population. Surveys indicate that Forest Hills residents think that a large Asian population will move to the village next.

There were 156 households, out of which 16.7% had children under the age of 18 living with them, 44.2% were married couples living together, 1.9% had a female householder with no husband present, and 51.9% were non-families. 31.4% of all households were made up of individuals, and 5.1% had someone living alone who was 65 years of age or older. The average household size was 2.12 and the average family size was 2.69.

In the village, the population was spread out, with 13.9% under the age of 18, 27.9% from 18 to 24, 14.5% from 25 to 44, 30.3% from 45 to 64, and 13.3% who were 65 years of age or older. The median age was 35 years. For every 100 females, there were 103.7 males. For every 100 females age 18 and over, there were 102.9 males.

The median income for a household in the village was $45,000, and the median income for a family was $64,375. Males had a median income of $38,750 versus $31,500 for females. The per capita income for the village was $25,949. None of the families and 18.3% of the population were living below the poverty line, including no under eighteens and none of those over 64.

== History ==
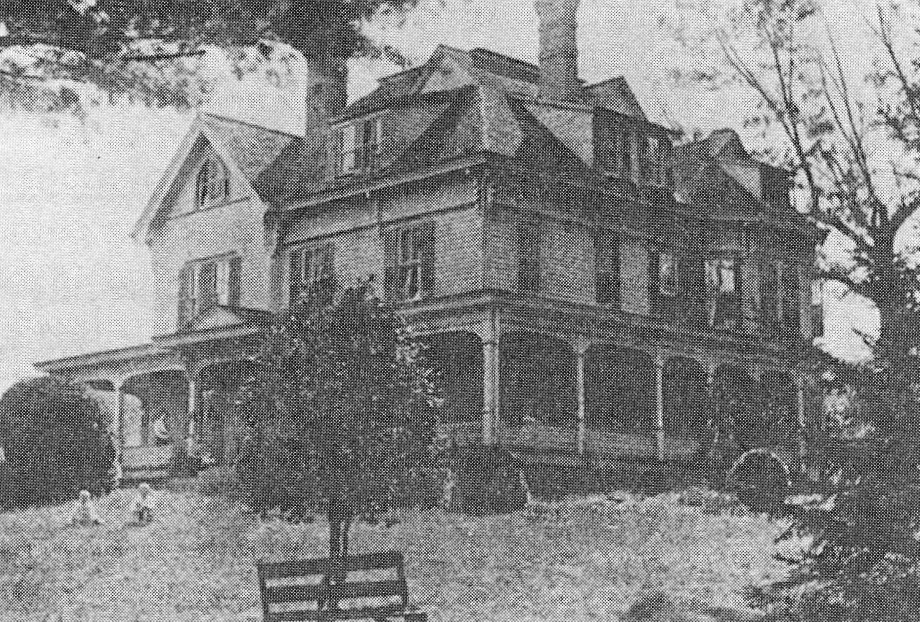
Forest Hill, 1885

The area now known as Forest Hills was named for the late 19th-century home of David D. Davies; it was once part of the large estate that he acquired in 1855, buying 2,000 acres (8.1 km^{2}). His property made up the territory of what is now a large part of the village.

Forest Hill was a large Victorian mansion built with a commanding view of the Cullowhee Valley. Later, the area became known as the Cox Farm, for a later owner. The mansion of Forest Hill was demolished in the 1980s, soon after developers began to construct housing here for the neighborhood to be known as Forest Hills.

Formerly, the Forest Hills Country Club occupied a large swath of land in the village, but this property is now mostly blighted and vacant. A motor lodge was built just above the middle of the golf course. This facility also rents some apartments to students.
