= North Carolina Highway 107 =

State highway in Jackson County, North Carolina, US

North Carolina Highway 107

Route information
- Maintained by NCDOT
- Length: 34.8 mi (56.0 km)
- Existed: 1921–present

Major junctions
- South end: SC 107 at the South Carolina state line
- US 64 in Cashiers
- North end: US 23 Bus. in Sylva

Location
- Country: United States
- State: North Carolina
- Counties: Jackson

Highway system
- North Carolina Highway System; Interstate; US; State; Scenic
← NC 106	→ NC 108

North Carolina Highway 107 (NC 107) is a primary state highway in the U.S. state of North Carolina. The highway runs north–south from the South Carolina state line, near Cashiers, to US 23 Business in Sylva.

== Route description ==
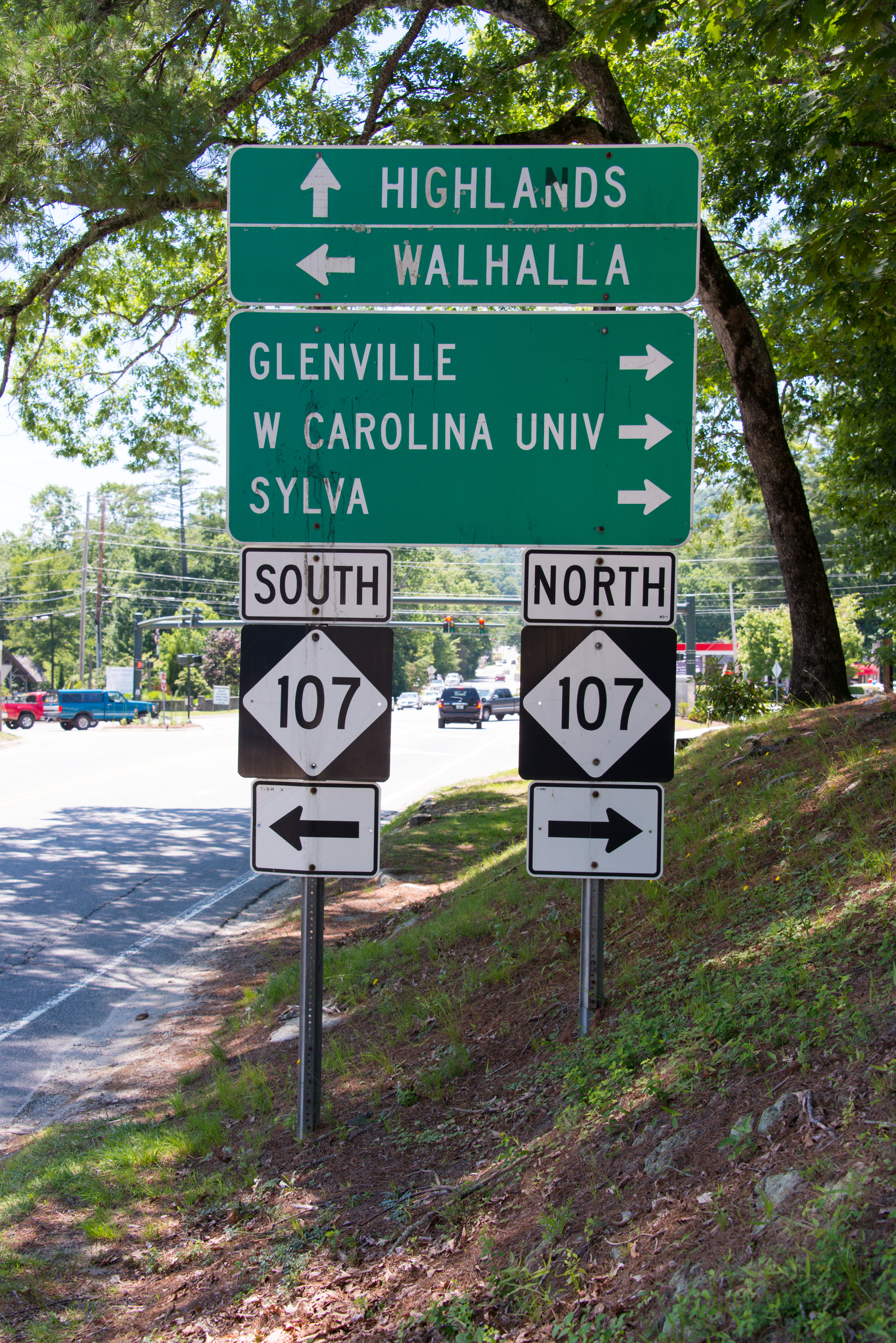
US 64 at NC 107, in Cashiers

The highway is four lanes between Sylva and Western Carolina University in Cullowhee, and two lanes beyond. Between WCU and Cashiers (about 18 miles (29 km)), the highway is a winding mountain road, and continues in this manner all the way to the South Carolina state border. The area of NC 107 in Sylva is lined with businesses.

== History ==
Established in the early 1920s as an original highway, it was a spur of NC 10 (now Old Highway 19A) from Ela, through Cherokee, to the Tennessee state line at Newfound Gap.

In 1940, the highway was rerouted south of Cherokee, replacing NC 107E; it then went concurrently with US 19 (now US 74/US 441) and Haywood Road (SR 1514) to Dillsboro and Sylva (now US 23 Bus). From Sylva, it replaced all of NC 106 south, through Cullowhee and Cashiers, to the South Carolina state line. The old route between Ela to Cherokee became part of NC 28 (now US 19).

In 1952, was truncated to its current northern terminus in Sylva; its route between Dillsboro to Tennessee was replaced by US 441. The final major change happened in 1981, when NC 107 was rerouted onto a new four-lane bypass west of Cullowhee; the old route became Old Cullowhee Road (SR 1002).

In 1994, the "Southern Loop" was added to the Jackson County thoroughfare plan that was to connect NC 107 with US 23/US 441 south of Dillsboro to US 23/US 74 east of Sylva; in 2003, it was added to the North Carolina Department of Transportation's (NCDOT) State Transportation Improvement Program as R-4745. In 2008, the western half of the project was removed, leaving the eastern half; the project was renamed the NC 107 Connector. Environmental impact studies were completed by end of 2012; however right of way acquisition was scheduled for 2021 and with construction unfunded (estimated cost at $132 million) and scheduled after 2023. On June 27, 2013, NCDOT issued a news release stating that after local input regarding the NC 107 connector, it was decided that they would instead focus on improving the existing NC 107 corridor between NC 116 and US 23 Business. Once improvements along this section is complete, NCDOT will decide whether there is a need for further study of the NC 107 Connector.

=== North Carolina Highway 107E ===
North Carolina Highway 107E
- Location: Cherokee, North Carolina
- Existed: 1938–1940

North Carolina Highway 107E (NC 107E) was established around 1938 as a renumbering of NC 112, from US 19 (now US 74/US 441) near Whittier, to NC 107 (now US 19/US 441 Bus.) in Cherokee. In 1940, it was replaced by realignment of NC 107 (now US 441/US 441 Bus.).

== Future ==
NCDOT plans to modernize two sections of NC 107. The first 7.06-mile (11.36 km) section of NC 107 is between the climbing lane to NC 281. The project includes widening lanes to twelve feet (3.7 m) from the current nine-foot (2.7 m) width and paving shoulders. At an estimated cost of $17.1 million, it is currently unfunded. The second 4.04-mile (6.50 km) section of NC 107 is between NC 281 and SR 1002 (Old Cullowhee Road). The project includes widening lanes to twelve feet (3.7 m) from the current nine feet (2.7 m) and improve shoulders. At an original estimated cost of $18.6 million, this project is scheduled for completion by 2024.

Once under consideration, but cancelled in favor of improvements to existing roadways, the NC 107 Connector would be a new 2.77-mile (4.46 km) four-lane freeway, connecting between NC 107 and US 23/US 74, east of Sylva. At an estimated cost of $66 million, it is currently unfunded.

== Major intersections ==
The entire route is in Jackson County.

Location	mi	km	Destinations	Notes
	0.0	0.0	SC 107 south – Walhalla	
Cashiers	8.2	13.2	US 64 – Highlands, Brevard	
Tuckasegee	23.0	37.0	NC 281 south (Canada Road)	Northern terminus of NC 281
			Evans Road – Southwestern Community College	Interchange; Northbound only; No access from southbound 107 to Evans Road
Sylva	33.0	53.1	NC 116 west (Webster Road) – Webster	Eastern terminus of NC 116
Sylva	34.8	56.0	US 23 Bus. (Asheville Highway/Main Street) – Dillsboro, Waynesville	
1.000 mi = 1.609 km; 1.000 km = 0.621 mi: Incomplete access

== See also ==
- North Carolina Bicycle Route 2 – Concurrent with NC 107 from Cullowhee Mountain Road near Forest Hills to Cope Creek Road near Sylva
