= Sapphire, North Carolina =

- Unincorporated community
- Location within North Carolina Location within the United States
- Coordinates: 35°06′25″N 83°00′11″W
- Country: United States
- State: North Carolina
- County: Transylvania
- Named for: The gemstone sapphire
- Elevation: 3,176 ft (968 m)
- Time zone: UTC-5 (Eastern (EST))
  - Summer (DST): UTC-4 (EDT)
- ZIP code: 28774
- Area code: 828
- GNIS feature ID: 1022501

Sapphire is an unincorporated community in Transylvania County, North Carolina, United States. Sapphire is 8.5 miles (13.7 km) east of Cashiers. Sapphire has a post office with ZIP code 28774.
