= North Carolina Highway 116 =

State highway in Jackson County, North Carolina, US

North Carolina Highway 116
- Webster Road

Route information
- Maintained by NCDOT
- Length: 4.1 mi (6.6 km)
- Existed: 1930–present

Major junctions
- West end: US 23 / US 441 near Dillsboro
- East end: NC 107 in Sylva

Location
- Country: United States
- State: North Carolina
- Counties: Jackson

Highway system
- North Carolina Highway System; Interstate; US; State; Scenic
← NC 115	→ US 117

North Carolina Highway 116 (NC 116) is a primary state highway in the U.S. state of North Carolina. The highway runs east–west but is signed south–north, connecting the town of Webster between two major highways in Jackson County.

== Route description ==
NC 116 is a two-lane mountain valley highway; it serves as a short-cut to Western Carolina University from Franklin and North Georgia. Mildly curvy, it passes through the town of Webster, where it crosses the Tuckasegee River.

== History ==
Established in 1930 as new primary routing from NC 285 (previously known as Franklin Road; today known as Mockingbird Lane) to NC 106 (renumbered in 1940 as NC 107). In the mid-1950s, the highway was extended west to a new alignment of US 23/US 441.

== Junction list ==
The entire route is in Jackson County.

Location	mi	km	Destinations	Notes
	0.0	0.0	US 23 / US 441 – Dillsboro, Franklin	No access from southbound NC 116 to US 23/US 441 southbound
Sylva	4.1	6.6	NC 107 – Sylva, Cullowhee	
1.000 mi = 1.609 km; 1.000 km = 0.621 mi: Incomplete access
