= Jackson County Public Schools (North Carolina) =

School district in North Carolina, United States

Jackson County Public Schools is a public school district serving Jackson County, North Carolina, US. It is headquartered in the county seat of Sylva. The Jackson County School system is unique in the way that is still has a K–8 system with combined elementary and middle schools, with one central high school and one combined K–12 elementary/middle/high school. The county school system has eight schools, all with different histories and stories behind why they are the way they are today. The school system includes four kindergarten-through-8th-grade schools, two kindergarten-through-12th-grade schools, one traditional 9th-through-12th-grade high school, and one alternative 9th-through-12th-grade high school early college.

It serves all areas of the county except for the Qualla Boundary (Eastern Cherokee Reservation), which is instead zoned to Cherokee Central Schools.

== History ==
The first school in the Jackson County area opened in 1830 near Cullowhee. A small, one-roomed structure, it set in place the basic formula for all schools in the area for the next 56 years. Small one-roomed schools dotted the landscape until the first high school opened in 1886 in Hamburgh (now Glenville).

In 1889, Cullowhee High School opened and the school later turned into Western Carolina University. The first public high school opened in Webster in 1910, and Sylva followed suit in 1912. Graded Schools, some with multiple floors, classrooms, and even Auditoriums and Gyms were built of wood in many areas, including Sylva, Webster, Dillsboro, Glenville, Tuckasegee and Qualla (near Whittier) in the early 1900s.

In the 1920s, the school district changed with the addition of multiple bigger consolidated graded Elementary and high schools. The largest high school was in Sylva, and it was built for $65,000 in 1924. Cullowhee School was built in 1923, followed by Sylva High School (1924), Colored Consolidated School (1924), Johns Creek (1925), East LaPorte (1925), Glenville (1926), Qualla (1927), Cowarts (1928), and Sylva Elementary (1929). During the great depression in the 1930s, the WPA helped build several schools. Webster Rock School (1936), Cashiers School (1938), McKee Training School (Cullowhee, 1939), Balsam School (1940) and Savannah Elementary School (1940) were several such projects.

In the 1940s, several schools that had deteriorated badly were renovated or replaced. Tuckaseigee School was built after a fire destroyed the original wooden structure in 1948, Barkers Creek School, which also served as a church and was a one-roomed school, was condemned in 1947, and Sylva Elementary School was condemned and had to be gutted and renovated in 1948. In the 1950s, the last one and two teacher schools and wooden graded schools closed and Log Cabin Associated Consolidated Elementary School (Dillsboro, 1950) (consolidated Wilmont, Dicks Creek, and Barkers Creek Schools), Scotts Creek School (Sylva, 1951) (Consolidated Willets, Balsam, Addie, and Beta Schools), and Canada Consolidated School (Little Canada, 1951) (Consolidated Charleys Creek, Wolf Mountain, Rock Bridge, and Tanasee Gap Schools), replaced them. At this time several older county schools got facelifts, renovations, and additions, and the relatively new Tuckaseigee and Balsam Schools closed.

In 1960, Sylva-Webster High School opened at what is now the Smoky Mountain High School campus, Colored Consolidated School got a new building, and Camp Laboratory School opened in 1964. At this time Sylva High School, Webster High School, McKee Training School, and Johns Creek School closed. Not long after it opened, Colored Consolidated was closed in 1965 in compliance with the 1964 Civil Rights Act. In 1973 Fairview Elementary School opened behind Sylva-Webster High School in Sylva, consolidating Sylva Elementary School (1929/1948), Webster Elementary School (1936), and Savannah Elementary School (1940/1955). In 1975, Blue Ridge School opened in Cashiers, consolidating Glenville Elementary School (1926), Glenville High School (1926/1951), and Cashiers Elementary School (1938/1951).

In 1980, Smokey Mountain Elementary School opened in Whittier near the old Qualla School, closing Qualla School (1927) and Log Cabin School (1950). In 1988, the biggest change since the 1960s to the high schools happened-Cullowhee High School was consolidated with Sylva-Webster High School at the old Sylva Webster Campus from 1960 and the new school was Smoky Mountain High School. A new two-story building was added to the Smoky Mountain High School campus the following year, to alleviate overcrowding. The Camp Laboratory School in Cullowhee remained active as a K-8 School for another six years until the new Cullowhee Valley School came online in 1994.

In 2001, Scotts Creek Elementary School received a new building, and in 2002 the former building became the HUB/School Of Alternatives. In 2004–2006, Smoky Mountain High School received several renovations and additions to the gym and main building. In 2008, Jackson County Early College opened at the Southwestern Community College Campus in Webster on NC 116, and in 2010 they received their own building. At about the same time, Blue Ridge School, which opened in 1975, divided into two parts, each with its own principal. Kindergarten through 6th Grade is now considered Blue Ridge Elementary School, and 7th through 12th grade is now considered Blue Ridge Virtual Early College High School.

== Schools ==
=== Elementary schools ===
Fairview Elementary School is a public kindergarten to Grade 8 school in Sylva which also serves the towns of Dillsboro, Webster, and Savannah. It opened in 1973 when the smaller Sylva, Webster, and Savannah elementary schools were merged. Classes are from kindergarten through Grade 8 and the school has around 726 students and 45 teachers. The buildings on the campus are five 100 ft (30 meter) diameter round "pods."

Cullowhee Valley School is a public kindergarten to Grade 8 school in Cullowhee, that opened in 1994 when Western Carolina University took over the former school building at Camp Laboratory School. The School provides education to Grade 8 for Cullowhee and the communities of Little Canada, East LaPorte, Forest Hills, Tuckasegee, and Caney Fork. with around 690 students and 70 teachers. During the construction of the school two pre-Columbian native American villages were discovered on the site dating from around 2000 BC and 1000 AD.

Scotts Creek Elementary School in Sylva was founded in 2001 and is the newest of the elementary schools in the district and replaced an older school of the same name that was built nearby in 1951. It has around 520 students and 30 teachers and serves part of the town of Sylva as well as the communities of Addie, Beta, Willets, Balsam, and Ochre Hill and is the flagship unit of the Jackson County School System.

Smokey Mountain Elementary School has around 450 students and 35 teachers and opened in 1980 on the merger of Log Cabin Association Consolidated Elementary School and Qualla Elementary School. Students in kindergarten through Grade 8 draw from the communities of Indian Hills, Barkers Creek, Qualla, Whittier, Wilmont and Dicks Creek, and part of the town of Dillsboro. It also is an alternative to the Cherokee Indian Reservation Elementary School and Middle School and provides arts programs and a Cherokee language program.

=== Smoky Mountain High School ===
Smoky Mountain High School is a public secondary school in Sylva and was formed as a result of the consolidation of the former Sylva-Webster High School and Cullowhee High School in 1988, at the Sylva-Webster Campus, which dates to 1960.

=== Jackson County Early College ===
Jackson County Early College is a public secondary school located in Sylva, North Carolina. It opened as an alternative to Smoky Mountain High School in 2008 for those students willing to put in extra work to also earn a community college 2-year degree along with their high school diploma.

=== Blue Ridge School ===
Blue Ridge is a combined kindergarten, elementary, middle, and high school in Cashiers and is the smallest school in the district. It was formed in 1975 from the merging of the larger Glenville Elementary and high school and the smaller Cashiers Elementary School.

=== The School Of Alternatives ===
The School Of Alternatives, also known as The HUB, is an alternative school in Jackson County, North Carolina for grades K-12 which deals with students who are disabled or have social/behavioral issues in the other county schools. It opened in the old Scotts Creek School, built in 1951, in 2002 after the new Scotts Creek Elementary School opened in 2001.

=== Sylva-Webster High School ===
Sylva-Webster High School, is a former high school that served as the main high school for the majority of grades 9–12, through the graduating classes of 1960–1988. Located in Jackson County, NC, at the intersection of Hwy 107 and Webster Road, Sylva-Webster High student body were the Golden Eagles, sporting the colors orange and black with an eagle for its mascot. The school's history fondly holds many extra-curricular and sports championship's from Band(earning one class an invitation to the Macy's Thanksgiving Day Parade) to Baseball, Basketball and Football. The school was consolidated with Cullowhee High School, Cullowhee, NC beginning with the Fall 1988, school year, and remains at its same intersection of Hwy 107 and Website Road, as Smoky Mountain High School. In the early 1990s, Coach Charles "Babe" Howell and several other Sylva residents incorporated the non-profit Jackson County Athletic Hall of Fame, to enshrine the students who showed outstanding athletic achievement by nomination and ultimately chosen by school records and a panel of board members.

In September 2019, more than thirty years after the last graduating class at Sylva-Webster, the first annual Sylva-Webster Fest was held at Bridge Park in Sylva. This event culminated when the older classes formed a committee regarding the interest in having a class-wide reunion. From there, bloomed one of the best class reunion ever imagined and over 500 in attendance from the combined classes.
