= Jackson County, North Carolina =

County in North Carolina, United States

- County
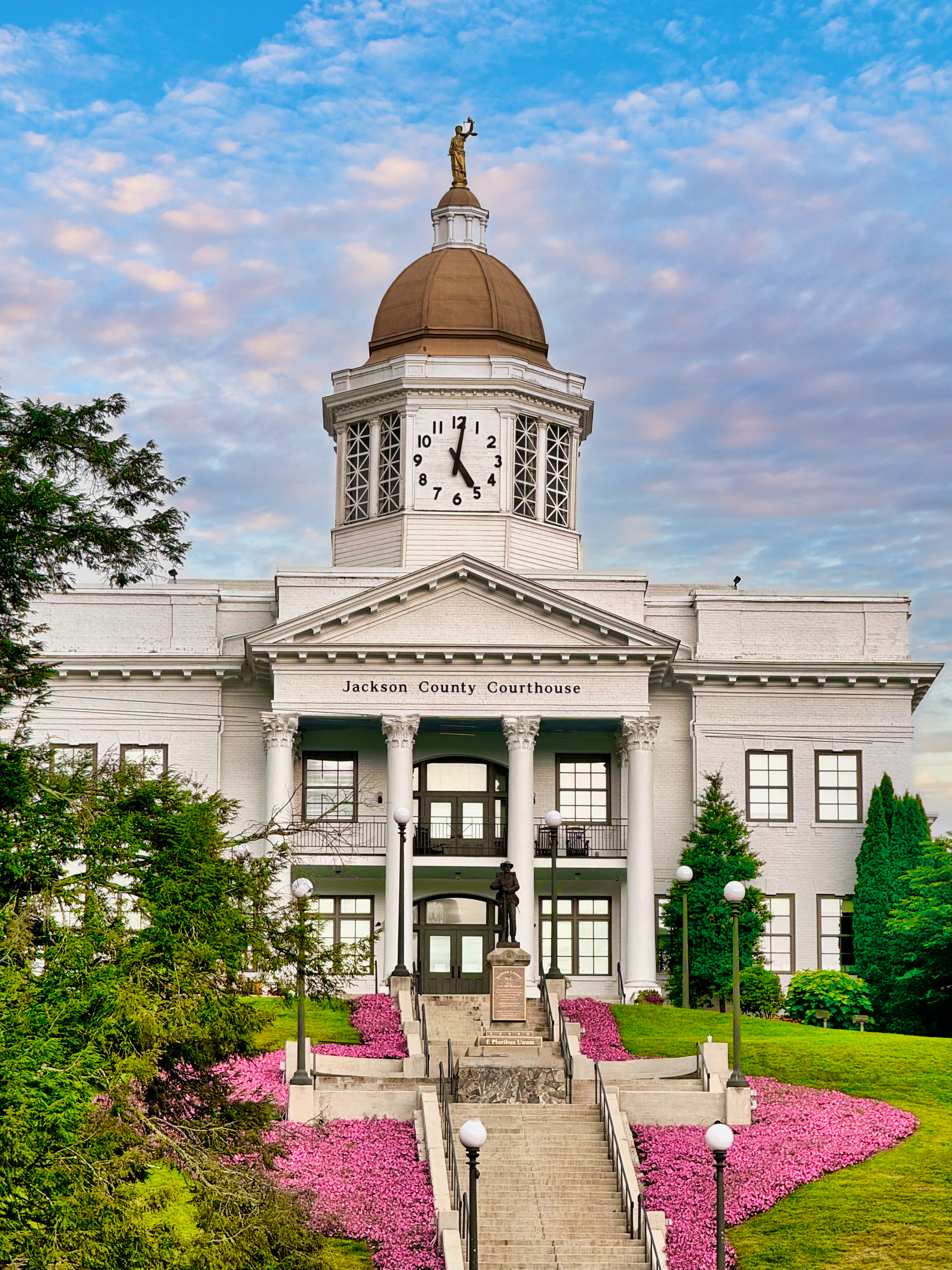
- Jackson County Courthouse in Sylva

- Flag Seal

- Location within the U.S. state of North Carolina
- Coordinates: 35.29°N 83.12°W
- Country: United States
- State: North Carolina
- Founded: 1851
- Named for: Andrew Jackson
- Seat: Sylva
- Largest community: Cullowhee

Area
  - Total: 494.88 sq mi (1,281.7 km^{2})
  - Land: 491.11 sq mi (1,272.0 km^{2})
  - Water: 3.77 sq mi (9.8 km^{2}) 0.76%

Population (2020)
  - Total: 43,109
  - Estimate (2025): 45,039 ▲
  - Density: 87.779/sq mi (33.892/km^{2})
- Time zone: UTC−5 (Eastern)
  - Summer (DST): UTC−4 (EDT)
- Congressional district: 11th
- Website: jacksonnc.org

Jackson County is a county located in the western part of the U.S. state of North Carolina. As of the 2020 census, the population was 43,109. Since 1913, its county seat has been Sylva, which replaced Webster. Cullowhee is the site of Western Carolina University (WCU). In the early 21st century, the university has more than 12,000 students, nearly twice the number of permanent residents of Cullowhee. The university has a strong influence in the region and county. More than 10 percent of the county residents identify as Native American, mostly Cherokee. The federally recognized Eastern Band of Cherokee Indians is based at Qualla Boundary, land that consists of territory in both Jackson and neighboring Swain County. This is one among three federally recognized Cherokee tribes nationally. The other two are based in what is now the state of Oklahoma, a former Indian Territory.

== History ==
This area was part of Cherokee Nation homelands at the time of European encounter. Cullowhee was one of several historic Cherokee towns that had developed along the Tuckasegee River, which has its headwaters here and runs into Swain County to the north. Like several other Cherokee towns in the region, Cullowhee was centered around a single earthwork platform mound, known as Cullowhee Mound, built by ancestral peoples. It is estimated to have been built about 1000 CE, by people during the period of the South Appalachian Mississippian culture. Archeological excavations have revealed evidence of indigenous peoples here since 3000 BCE.

While most Cherokee were forced out of the area through succeeding treaties for land cessions, followed by removal to Indian Territory in the late 1830s, hundreds of Cherokee stayed in Western North Carolina. Their descendants form most of the federally recognized Eastern Band of Cherokee Indians (EBCI), the only tribe in the state to have this status. They are based on Qualla Boundary, which is located in Swain and Jackson counties. Their citizens make up most of the more than ten percent of people in Jackson County who identify as Native American on the US census.

=== Mid-19th century to present ===
The European-American population increased slowly in this isolated, mountainous area of the state. Jackson County was not organized until 1851, when it was created from parts of Haywood and Macon counties. It was named for Andrew Jackson, President of the United States from 1829 to 1837, who promoted Indian Removal from the Southeast in order to allow development by European Americans. The original county courts were held at the home of Dan Bryson in Beta, Scott Creek township. They were moved to Webster the following year.

In 1861 parts of Jackson and Henderson counties were combined to form Transylvania County. In 1871 parts of Jackson and Macon counties were combined to form Swain County. In 1913 Sylva was designated by the legislature as the county seat of Jackson County.

In the 1880s, mining companies began to mine for kaolin, used to produce porcelain. Charles Joseph Harris (11 Sep 1853–14 Feb 1944) moved here from Denver, Colorado about 1888 and became important to development of the county and Western North Carolina from the late 19th century into the 20th century. He eventually established his own mining companies, and shipped kaolin to Trenton, New Jersey, among other places, which was a major manufacturing center. He also acquired tens of thousands of acres of woodland and established lumber businesses. His two sons, David Rust and Robert Ward Harris, joined him in these family businesses.

== Geography ==
Interactive map of Jackson County

According to the U.S. Census Bureau, the county has a total area of 494.88 square miles (1,281.7 km^{2}), of which 491.11 square miles (1,272.0 km^{2}) is land and 3.77 square miles (9.8 km^{2}) (0.76%) is water. The Tuckasegee River flows through the county.

=== National protected areas ===
- Blue Ridge Parkway (part)
- Ellicott Rock Wilderness (part)
- Judaculla Rock (part)
- Nantahala National Forest (part)
- Qualla Boundary (part)
- Waterrock Knob (part)

=== State and local protected areas/sites ===
- Judaculla Rock
- Nantahala National Forest Game Land (part)
- The Pines Recreation Area
- Pisgah National Forest Game Land (part)
- Ralph J Andrews Recreation Park
- Salt Rock Gap
- Southern Highlands Reserve (part)

=== Major water bodies ===
- Bear Creek Lake
- Brushy Creek
- Cedar Cliff Lake
- Chattooga River
- Connelly Creek
- Dark Ridge Creek
- Greens Creek
- Horsepasture River
- Lake Glenville
- Oconaluftee River
- Slickens Creek
- Toxaway River
- Tuckasegee River
- Wayhutta Creek
- West Fork Tuckasegee River
- Whitewater River

=== Adjacent counties ===
- Haywood County – northeast
- Transylvania County – east
- Oconee County, South Carolina - south
- Macon County – west
- Swain County – northwest

== Demographics ==
Historical population
Census	Pop.	Note	%±
1860	5,515		—
1870	6,683		21.2%
1880	7,343		9.9%
1890	9,512		29.5%
1900	11,853		24.6%
1910	12,998		9.7%
1920	13,396		3.1%
1930	17,519		30.8%
1940	19,366		10.5%
1950	19,261		−0.5%
1960	17,780		−7.7%
1970	21,593		21.4%
1980	25,811		19.5%
1990	26,846		4.0%
2000	33,121		23.4%
2010	40,271		21.6%
2020	43,109		7.0%
2025 (est.)	45,039	▲	4.5%
U.S. Decennial Census; 1790–1960 1900–1990; 1990–2000 2010 2020

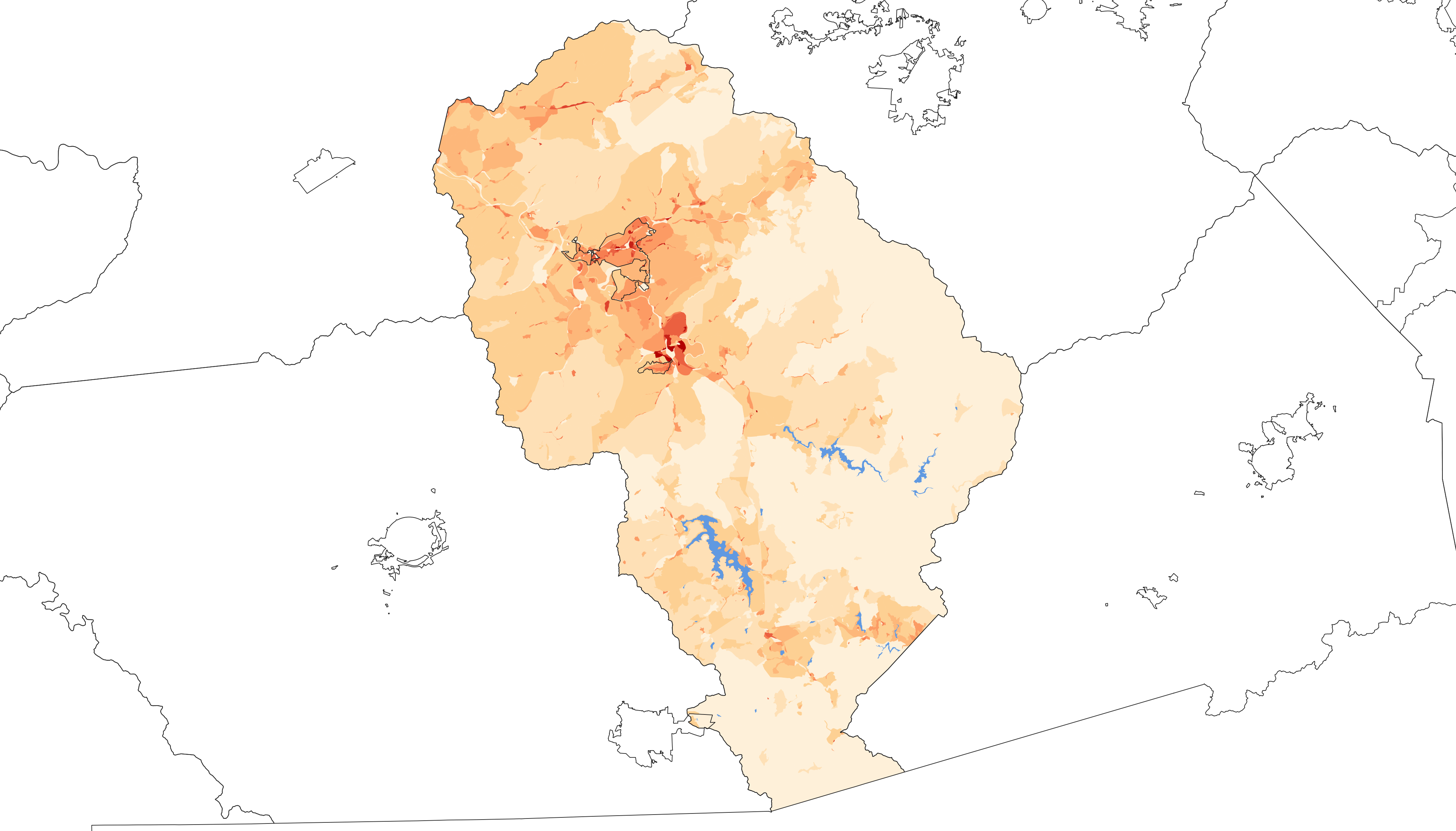
2020 population density of Jackson County NC by census block

=== Racial and ethnic composition ===
Jackson County, North Carolina – Racial and ethnic composition Note: the US Census treats Hispanic/Latino as an ethnic category. This table excludes Latinos from the racial categories and assigns them to a separate category. Hispanics/Latinos may be of any race.
Race / Ethnicity (NH = Non-Hispanic)	Pop 1980	Pop 1990	Pop 2000	Pop 2010	Pop 2020	% 1980	% 1990	% 2000	% 2010	% 2020
White alone (NH)	22,598	23,507	28,093	32,795	32,800	87.55%	87.56%	84.82%	81.44%	76.09%
Black or African American alone (NH)	517	425	547	729	736	2.00%	1.58%	1.65%	1.81%	1.71%
Native American or Alaska Native alone (NH)	1,937	2,650	3,303	3,656	3,849	7.50%	9.87%	9.97%	9.08%	8.93%
Asian alone (NH)	44	106	161	339	497	0.17%	0.39%	0.49%	0.84%	1.15%
Native Hawaiian or Pacific Islander alone (NH)	x	x	5	14	10	x	x	0.02%	0.03%	0.02%
Other race alone (NH)	0	3	19	23	105	0.00%	0.01%	0.06%	0.06%	0.24%
Mixed race or Multiracial (NH)	x	x	416	677	1,820	x	x	1.26%	1.68%	4.22%
Hispanic or Latino (any race)	715	155	577	2,038	3,292	2.77%	0.58%	1.74%	5.06%	7.64%
Total	25,811	26,846	33,121	40,271	43,109	100.00%	100.00%	100.00%	100.00%	100.00%

=== 2020 census ===
As of the 2020 census, there were 43,109 people, 16,876 households, and 9,964 families residing in the county, and the median age was 36.2 years.

17.0% of residents were under the age of 18 and 19.6% of residents were 65 years of age or older. For every 100 females there were 95.9 males, and for every 100 females age 18 and over there were 93.3 males age 18 and over.

The racial makeup of the county was 77.5% White, 2.0% Black or African American, 9.5% American Indian and Alaska Native, 1.2% Asian, <0.1% Native Hawaiian and Pacific Islander, 3.9% from some other race, and 5.9% from two or more races. Hispanic or Latino residents of any race comprised 7.6% of the population.

33.3% of residents lived in urban areas, while 66.7% lived in rural areas.

Of the 16,876 households in the county, 23.9% had children under the age of 18 living in them. Of all households, 43.2% were married-couple households, 21.0% were households with a male householder and no spouse or partner present, and 28.4% were households with a female householder and no spouse or partner present. About 30.6% of all households were made up of individuals and 12.0% had someone living alone who was 65 years of age or older.

There were 26,649 housing units, of which 36.7% were vacant. Among occupied housing units, 66.0% were owner-occupied and 34.0% were renter-occupied. The homeowner vacancy rate was 2.3% and the rental vacancy rate was 12.1%.

=== 2010 census ===
At the 2010 census, there were 40,271 people.

=== 2000 census ===
As of the 2000 census, there were 13,191 households and 8,587 families residing in the county. The population density was 68 people per square mile (26 people/km^{2}). There were 19,291 housing units at an average density of 39 units per square mile (15 units/km^{2}). The racial makeup of the county was 85.68% White, 1.67% Black or African American, 10.20% Native American (mostly Cherokee), 0.51% Asian, 0.02% Pacific Islander, 0.55% from other races, and 1.38% from two or more races. 1.74% of the population were Hispanic or Latino of any race. 18.5% identify as being of American, 13.7% as English, 11.3% as Irish, 10.5% as German and 9.2% as of Scots-Irish ancestry according to Census 2000. 95.3% spoke English, 2.1% Spanish and 1.5% Cherokee as their first language.

There were 13,191 households, out of which 25.50% had children under the age of 18 living with them, 51.40% were married couples living together, 10.00% had a female householder with no husband present, and 34.90% were non-families. 27.00% of all households were made up of individuals, and 9.80% had someone living alone who was 65 years of age or older. The average household size was 2.30 and the average family size was 2.79.

In the county, the population was spread out, with 19.00% under the age of 18, 17.90% from 18 to 24, 24.40% from 25 to 44, 25.00% from 45 to 64, and 13.80% who were 65 years of age or older. The median age was 36 years. For every 100 females there were 95.40 males. For every 100 females age 18 and over, there were 93.10 males.

The median income for a household in the county was $32,552, and the median income for a family was $40,876. Males had a median income of $27,738 versus $22,029 for females. The per capita income for the county was $17,582. About 9.50% of families and 15.10% of the population were below the poverty line, including 15.70% of those under age 18 and 15.20% of those age 65 or over.

== Law, government, and politics ==
=== Government ===
As mandated by the laws of North Carolina, Jackson County has a commission-manager form of government. The five members of Board of Commissioners are elected at-large to four-year terms. This system of at-large voting, rather than having representatives elected from single-member districts, favors candidates supported by the majority of the population. Together they appoint and oversee the actions of a County Manager, who administers operations.

Jackson County is a member of the regional Southwestern Commission council of governments.

Jackson County contains a portion of the Qualla Boundary, a land trust of historic territory of the federally recognized Eastern Band of Cherokee Indians. The tribe is sovereign in its territory and is the only federally recognized tribe in the state. The reservation operates Harrah's Cherokee Casino, which is open to the public, as are associated resort facilities there.

=== Sheriff and Sylva PD ===
The Jackson County Sheriff provides court protection, jail administration, patrol and detective services for all of Jackson County except for incorporated Sylva, which has a municipal police department.

=== Politics ===
Together with Buncombe and Watauga counties, Jackson is considered one of three "swing" counties in Western North Carolina. Except for 1980, it would vote for the winner in every Presidential election from 1960 to 2008. The exception was 1980, when Jimmy Carter won the county but lost nationally.

In 2012, Jackson County voters favored Republican candidate Mitt Romney, who was defeated by President Barack Obama. In 2016 county voters split their vote, favoring Donald Trump for the presidency, but Democrat Roy Cooper for governor. The county was one of four in the state to do so. In 2020, Jackson County voters favored Republicans Donald Trump and gubernatorial challenger Dan Forest, but Democrat Joe Biden won the election nationally and Cooper was reelected as governor. While Trump won the county by a similar margin in 2024, Democrat Josh Stein flipped the county on route to his election as governor.

United States presidential election results for Jackson County, North Carolina
Year	Republican		Democratic		Third party(ies)	
Year	No.	%	No.	%	No.	%
1912	315	13.94%	1,210	53.56%	734	32.49%
1916	1,288	49.65%	1,306	50.35%	0	0.00%
1920	2,355	49.68%	2,385	50.32%	0	0.00%
1924	2,788	47.21%	3,100	52.50%	17	0.29%
1928	3,512	52.55%	3,171	47.45%	0	0.00%
1932	2,813	39.03%	4,360	60.49%	35	0.49%
1936	3,061	40.06%	4,580	59.94%	0	0.00%
1940	2,410	34.56%	4,563	65.44%	0	0.00%
1944	2,694	39.60%	4,109	60.40%	0	0.00%
1948	2,520	37.47%	4,005	59.55%	200	2.97%
1952	3,680	46.14%	4,296	53.86%	0	0.00%
1956	3,503	48.05%	3,787	51.95%	0	0.00%
1960	4,017	50.74%	3,900	49.26%	0	0.00%
1964	3,183	39.35%	4,905	60.65%	0	0.00%
1968	3,747	48.14%	2,956	37.98%	1,080	13.88%
1972	4,709	59.11%	3,169	39.78%	89	1.12%
1976	3,536	40.25%	5,223	59.45%	26	0.30%
1980	4,140	44.47%	4,857	52.17%	313	3.36%
1984	5,582	55.97%	4,367	43.78%	25	0.25%
1988	5,166	51.03%	4,933	48.73%	24	0.24%
1992	4,275	36.99%	5,753	49.78%	1,530	13.24%
1996	4,244	40.40%	5,211	49.60%	1,051	10.00%
2000	6,237	51.46%	5,722	47.21%	162	1.34%
2004	7,351	51.86%	6,737	47.53%	86	0.61%
2008	7,854	46.57%	8,766	51.97%	246	1.46%
2012	8,254	49.42%	8,095	48.47%	352	2.11%
2016	9,870	52.74%	7,713	41.22%	1,130	6.04%
2020	11,356	53.00%	9,591	44.76%	481	2.24%
2024	11,796	53.76%	9,746	44.42%	400	1.82%

==== 2020 presidential election ====
In 2020 the county and the state voted for incumbent Donald Trump, but Democrat Joe Biden carried the election overall, winning both the popular vote and electoral college.

==== 2016 presidential election ====
In the 2016 Republican Primary in Jackson County, Donald Trump received 1,624 votes (or 39.5% of the total votes) followed by Ted Cruz, who had 1,434 votes (or 34.9% of the total votes). In the 2016 Democratic Primary, Bernie Sanders received 3,021 votes (57.0% of the total); Hillary Clinton received 2,022 votes (38.1% of the total).

In the general election Donald Trump received 9,870 votes (or 52.7% of the total vote); Hillary Clinton received 7,713 votes (41.2% of the total vote) and Libertarian Candidate Gary Johnson received 742 votes (4.0% of total votes in the county).

== Transportation ==
=== Major highways ===
- US 19
- US 19 Truck
- US 23
- US 23 Bus.
- US 64
- US 64 Truck
- US 74
- US 441
- US 441 Bus.
- NC 107
- NC 116
- NC 215
- NC 281
- Blue Ridge Parkway

Jackson County is served by three main roads: the Great Smoky Mountains Expressway runs east–west across the northern half of the county and connects the county seat of Sylva to Waynesville and Asheville in the east and Cherokee, Andrews and Murphy in the west. North Carolina State Highway 107 connects Sylva and Western Carolina University to Cashiers in the south. U.S. Highway 64 traverses east–west across the southern part of the county connecting Cashiers to Brevard in the east and Highlands in the west.

=== Airport ===
Jackson County Airport is located here, one mile (1.6 km) east of Cullowhee. It is governed by the Jackson County Airport Authority.

=== Railroads ===
Norfolk Southern Railway operates a portion known as the Murphy Branch through Jackson County, providing a rail connection with the rest of the country. In Sylva, Norfolk Southern connects with the Great Smoky Mountains Railroad. Interchange between the two lines is handled near the site of the Jackson Paper Company. Great Smoky Mountains RR operates the rest of the Murphy Branch from Dillsboro to Andrews.

Because of competition with independent automobile traffic, passenger rail traffic declined; it was stopped in 1948 from Sylva to Murphy. Despite widespread restructuring in the industry across the country, freight commercial service continued another forty-odd years before ending in 1983. In 2015, Watco, which purchased the section which Norfolk Southern previously owned, was reportedly in talks with the towns and counties in an attempt to build a viable tourist railroad clientele. The major obstacle for such service is the Cowee Mountain Tunnel, which does not meet height and weight specifications for modern rail engines and passenger cars.

== Education ==
Jackson County Public Schools serves all areas of the county except for the Qualla Boundary (Eastern Cherokee Reservation), which is instead zoned to Cherokee Central Schools. The county also is home to Western Carolina University in Cullowhee.

== Communities ==
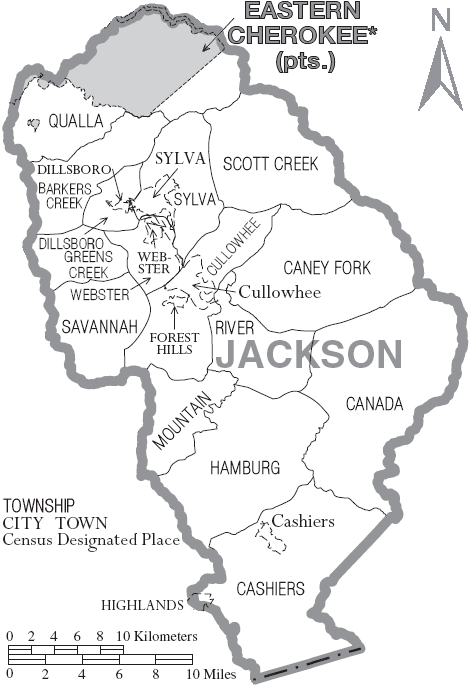
Map of Jackson County with municipal and township labels

=== Towns ===
- Dillsboro
- Highlands
- Sylva (county seat)
- Webster

=== Village ===
- Forest Hills

=== Census-designated places ===
- Cashiers
- Cherokee (also in Swain County)
- Cullowhee (largest community)
- Glenville
- Whittier

=== Unincorporated communities ===
- Addie
- Balsam
- Beta
- Gay
- Savannah
- Tuckasegee
- Willets
- Wilmot

=== Townships ===
The county is divided into fifteen townships:

Barker's Creek: Named for the creek which starts here and flows through the township before entering the Tuckasegee River. It includes the Dicks Creek, Barkers Creek, and Wilmont communities. US 74/23 runs as a four-lane divided highway through the township. The township is served by Smokey Mountain Elementary School and Smoky Mountain High School. Formerly, the Log Cabin Association Consolidated School served the township, but it closed in 1980 when Smokey Mountain Elementary opened.

Canada: Named for the tall ridges, narrow valleys, and sharp peaks of this part of the county, the main waterway is the East Fork of the Tuckasegee River, which flows into the River Township before joining the West Fork, becoming the Tuckasegee River. There are four major lakes: Bear, Wolf, Tanasee Creek, and Ceader Cliff, in the township. It is served by NC 281 and is one of the most remote locations in the county. It is served by Cullowhee Valley School and Smoky Mountain High School. Before the 1990s, the schools for the area were Canada Consolidated School and Cullowhee High School, both closed in the 1980s.

Caney Fork: Named for the creek that flows through the township, which empties into the Tuckasegee River at East LaPorte. The main road is Caney Fork Road. The area is served by Cullowhee Valley School and Smoky Mountain High School. Prior to 1964, the schools that served the area were Johns Creek Elementary and Cullowhee High School.

Cashiers: Named for a lost horse, the town of Cashiers includes the communities of Panthertown Valley, Whiteside Cove, Fairfield, and Sapphire. It is served by NC 107 and US 64. The Eastern Continental Divide follows a ridge north of the township, and defines the boundaries between the Cashiers, Canada, and Glenville townships. The Chattooga, Horsepasture, and Toxaway rivers all originate or flow through the township. It is served by Blue Ridge School, which consolidated Glenville School and Cashiers Elementary in 1975.

Cullowhee: This is derived from the Cherokee name for the valley, which referred to a legendary figure, Judacullah. NC 107, Old NC 107, and NC 107-Alternate all serve the township as major roads; NC 107 is the only 4-lane roadway. Western Carolina University, the village of Forest Hills, and the communities of Speedwell, Old Cullowhee Road, Buzzards Roost, and Dicks Gap are all within the township.

In the nineteenth century, this was one of the first areas in the county to be settled by European Americans, along with Caney Fork, River, Scott Creek, and Canada townships. It is the largest township by population according to the 2000 United States census. The Cullowhee Creek, a tributary, and the Tuckasegee River both flow through the township; the confluence is around Old Cullowhee Road. The township is served by the local Cullowhee Valley School. Older children go to Smoky Mountain High School in Sylva. The former Cullowhee High School closed in 1988.

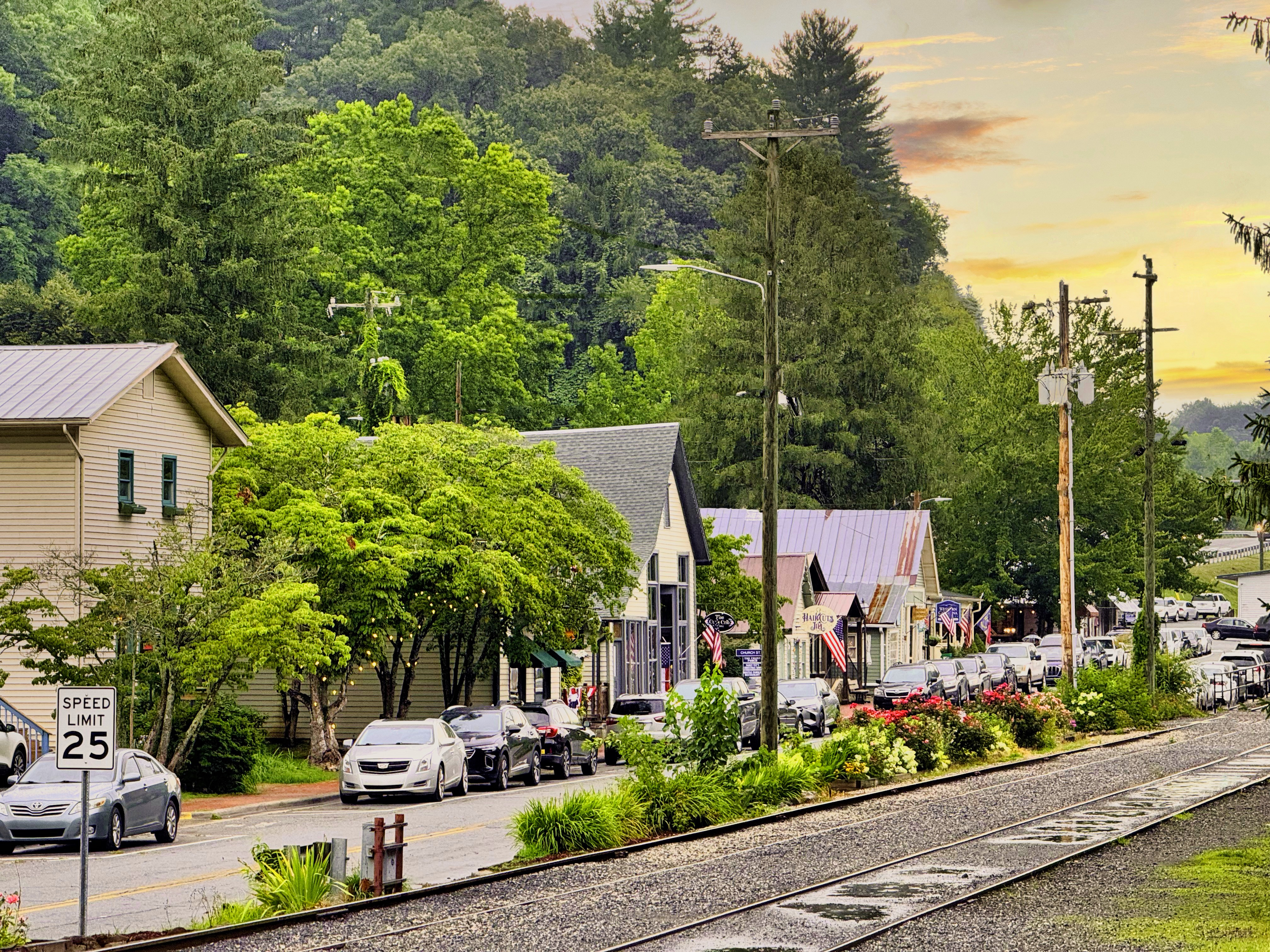
Downtown Dillsboro

Dillsboro: Named after the Dills family who founded the town, the township also has the town of Dillsboro. Scotts Creek arises to the northwest, flowing from Scott Creek Township through Sylva Township into Dillsboro Township, where it flows into the Tuckasegee River. US 74/23, US 441, and NC 107 converge in two major intersections within the township. The township is served by Smokey Mountain and Fairview elementary schools and by Smoky Mountain High School. It has not had its own school since Dillsboro Elementary closed in 1951. The students were transferred to Log Cabin School in Barkers Creek Township, or Sylva Elementary School in Sylva township.

Greens Creek: Named for the creek which flows through most of the township before emptying into Savannah Creek, this township is served by US 441, a four-lane highway along the western edge. Greens Creek Road goes through the middle of the township. The township is served by Fairview Elementary School and Smoky Mountain High School. It was formerly served by the Savannah Consolidated School, from 1940 to 1973.

Hamburg: Named for the fort and original name of Glenville, the township is served by NC 107. The area was once a large valley, but the valley was flooded in 1941 by a dam on the Tuckasegee River, which formed Lake Glenville. The West Fork of the Tuckasegee River originates within the township, and flows north into the River Township. Blue Ridge School is located in the township and serves the township. It developed in 1975 from the consolidation of the Glenville School and Cashiers Elementary School.

Mountain: Named for Cullowhee Mountain, this township is served by NC 107 Alternate. The headwaters of Cullowhee Creek are located here, flowing north into Cullowhee Township before joining the Tuckasegee River. It is served by Cullowhee Valley School/Smoky Mountain High School in Cullowhee and Sylva, respectively. It was formerly served by Cullowhee High School and Camp Lab Elementary.

Qualla: Named for the Qualla Boundary, which occupies most of the township, Qualla Township is served by US 441, US 19, and US 74/23. Smokey Mountain Elementary School is located in the township, resulting from the 1980 consolidation of Qualla Elementary School and Log Cabin Association Consolidated School. It is served by the Jackson County Public School System and the Cherokee Reservation School System. Students can choose among Smokey Mountain Elementary/Smoky Mountain High School, Cherokee School, or Swain East Elementary, Swain Middle School, and Swain High School. A Cherokee language immersion school has been founded in the township. The communities of Qualla, Birdtown, Soco, Whittier, Indian Hills, and Wilmont are all located at least partially, if not wholly, within the township.

River: Named for the Tuckasegee River, which is formed within the township by the confluence of two streams, it is served by NC 107 and NC 281. The community of Tuckasegee is located in the township. It is served by Cullowhee Valley School/Smoky Mountain High School. Prior to 1958, Tuckasegee School and Cullowhee High School both operated here.

Savannah: Named for Savannah Creek, which runs through the district, this township includes the Viewpoint, Pumpkintown, Savannah, and Fort Wilderness communities. The township is served by four-lane US 441. Fairview Elementary School and Smoky Mountain High School serve the township as well. From 1940 to 1973, it was home to Savannah Consolidated School. Its higher-grade students went to Webster High School and now Sylva-Webster High School.

Scotts Creek: Named for Scotts Creek, which starts here and flows through the township before passing into Sylva Township. It is served by US 74/23 and old US 19/23, which run through the five communities within the township: Balsam, Willets, Ochre Hill, Addie and Beta. The Murphy Branch Railroad also runs through the township. Scotts Creek School has served the township since 1951. It had a new building constructed in 2001. The old school building is now used for the Jackson County School of Alternatives (the HUB).

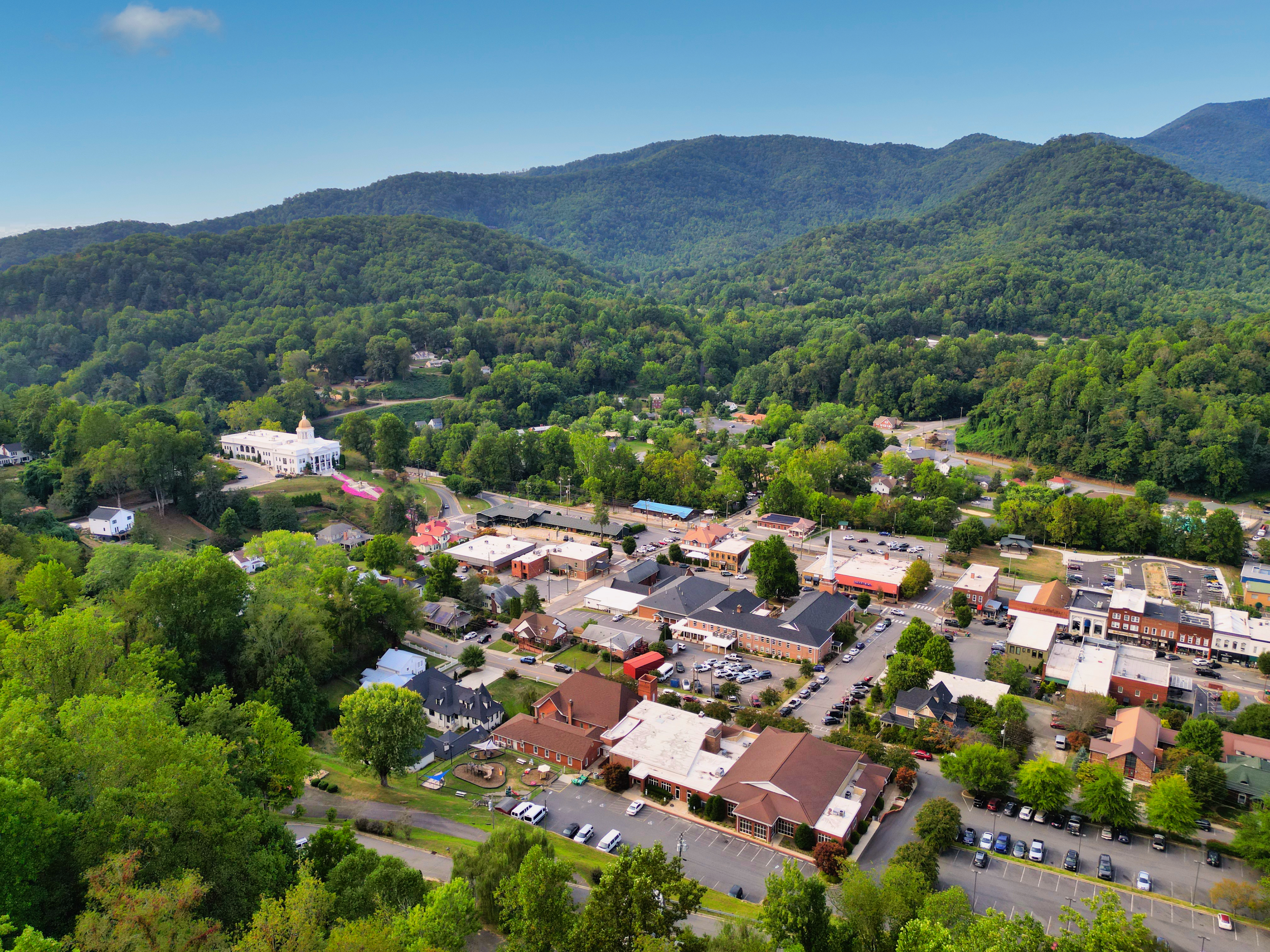
Aerial view of downtown Sylva

Sylva: Named for William D. Sylva, as is the town and county seat of Sylva, located within the township. It is served by NC 107, US 74/23, and BUS 23. The Jackson County Courthouse and Library are both located in the township. Scotts Creek runs through the township before flowing into the Tuckasegee in Dillsboro Township. The township is served by Fairview and Scotts Creek elementary schools and Smoky Mountain High School; the latter serves all the county. Consolidation since the late 20th century closed many smaller schools in the county.

Webster: Also the site of the town of Webster, this township is at the original geographical center of the county. Due to territorial changes, that is now Cullowhee Township. For many years, it had the only town in Jackson County. It is served by NC 116 and NC 107. The county seat designation and courthouse were located here from 1851 to 1913. Since Sylva was designated as the county seat, Webster lost business. The schools that serve the township are Fairview Elementary School (1973) and Smoky Mountain High School (1960/1988).

== In popular culture ==
Several movies have been filmed in the county. These include the action-adventure The Fugitive (1993), starring Harrison Ford and Tommy Lee Jones; the drama Deliverance (1972), which also set a scene against downtown Sylva; and the comedy My Fellow Americans (1996) starring Jack Lemmon and James Garner.

- The train wreck scene in The Fugitive was filmed in Dillsboro along the Great Smoky Mountains Railroad. The wreckage set can still be viewed on outbound train excursions from Dillsboro. The later scene in a small hospital was filmed at Harris Regional Hospital in Sylva.
- The Great Smoky Mountains Railroad was also used in the filming of My Fellow Americans. The characters are seen getting on to one of their trains as a stand-in for a charter train full of North Carolina Tar Heels fans headed for the NCAA Final Four.
- Sylva's Main Street was used in the filming of Three Billboards outside Ebbing, Missouri (2016).
- Ron Rash's 2008 novel, Serena, features Jackson County.
- David Joy's novels, Where All Light Tends to Go and The Weight of This World, are set in Jackson County.

== See also ==
- List of counties in North Carolina
- National Register of Historic Places listings in Jackson County, North Carolina
- Great Smoky Mountains
