= Cashiers, North Carolina =

Unincorporated village in Jackson County, North Carolina

- Census-designated place
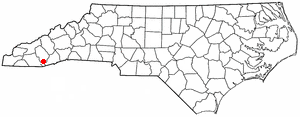
- Location of Cashiers, North Carolina
- Coordinates: 35°06′24″N 83°05′50″W
- Country: United States
- State: North Carolina
- County: Jackson
- Incorporated: 1927 (inactive)

Area
  - Total: 4.13 sq mi (10.70 km^{2})
  - Land: 4.10 sq mi (10.62 km^{2})
  - Water: 0.031 sq mi (0.08 km^{2})
- Elevation: 3,484 ft (1,062 m)

Population (2020)
  - Total: 657
  - Density: 160.3/sq mi (61.88/km^{2})
- Time zone: UTC-5 (Eastern (EST))
  - Summer (DST): UTC-4 (EDT)
- ZIP code: 28717
- Area code: 828
- FIPS code: 37-10800
- GNIS feature ID: 2402751

Cashiers (/ˈkæʃərz/ KASH-ərz) is a census-designated place (CDP) and unincorporated village located in southern Jackson County, North Carolina, United States. As of the 2020 United States census, the community had a total population of 657, up from 157 at the 2010 census. Cashiers is pronounced KASH-erz locally, and is one of several communities in the area popular with tourists and owners of vacation homes.

The village is at the crossroads of U.S. Route 64 (US 64) and North Carolina Highway 107 (NC 107), the two of which connect to Highlands, Brevard, Sylva, and Walhalla.

== History ==
The establishment of Cashiers began with two men: Barak Norton, the first white settler in Whiteside Cove, and Colonel John Zachary, who, with his talented sons, was responsible for the area's economic and civic development. Barak Norton came to the area around 1820, and the land he claimed in the area, including a gold mine, eventually became Cashiers' main business district. Colonel John Zachary arrived in the area in 1833 and by 1836 received a 640-acre (260 ha) state land grant, plus two 100-acre (40 ha) land grants adjoining the 640 acres (260 ha). The Zachary family set up several businesses, including a general store and sawmill; they provided trade skills such as bricklaying, hat-making, and carpentry.

Several stories exist as to the derivation of the name Cashiers including a racehorse, steer, or mule named Cash or a hermit living in the area with the name. However, it has been concluded that the Zachary Family came up with the name related to their accounting work for individual gold miners in the area, being the "cashier". In 1839, Jonathan Zachary, the youngest son of the family, applied to become the first postmaster for, what he called, "Cashiers Valley;" it was changed to Cashiers in 1881.

In 1851, the first Post Office was established. In 1855, the Zachary Family sold land to Wade Hampton II, in what later became the High Hampton Inn. In 1927, Cashiers received a town charter from the state, but has since become inactive with no acting government body. In 2003, the North Carolina General Assembly passed local legislation allowing Cashiers to re-incorporate, but this was turned down by a vote of 161 to 302 in a local referendum on August 12. The Jackson County government set up a special zoning council for Cashiers in response; operated by the county, it covers what would normally be done by a municipality.

Five properties near Cashiers are listed on the National Register of Historic Places—Camp Merrie-Woode, the Church of the Good Shepherd, Fairfield Inn, the High Hampton Inn Historic District, and the Mordecai Zachary House.

== Geography ==
According to the United States Census Bureau, the community has a total area of 1.1 square miles (2.8 km^{2}), all land.

Cashiers and the nearby towns of Highlands, Glenville, and Sapphire make up a popular mountain vacation area near the southern end of the Blue Ridge Mountains, the easternmost front of the Appalachian Mountains. Cashiers is surrounded by scenic views, waterfalls, and Nantahala National Forest land. Visitors and vacation home owners from all over the southeast enjoy hiking, mountain biking, golf, and fly fishing during the warm months of the year.

The United States Forest Service and The Nature Conservancy have worked to protect several natural areas near Cashiers, including the biologically diverse Panthertown Valley, Whitewater Falls, and the Tuckaseegee River Gorge. The Chattooga River also rises near Cashiers.

=== Climate ===
Cashiers is part of the Appalachian temperate rainforest and receives an average of 87.57 inches of precipitation annually, over 7.25 inches a month, making it one of the rainiest places in the eastern United States. It is also one of the coolest places in the mountains, with an average daily July temperature of 78 degrees.

== Demographics ==
Historical population
| Census | Pop. | Note | %± |
|---|---|---|---|
| 2020 | 657 | | — |
U.S. Decennial Census

As of the census of 2000, there were 196 people, 96 households, and 48 families living in the community. The population density was 182.0 inhabitants per square mile (70.3/km^{2}). There were 182 housing units at an average density of 169.0 per square mile (65.3/km^{2}). The racial makeup of the community was 98.98% White and 1.02% from two or more races. Hispanic or Latino of any race were 0.51% of the population.

There were 96 households out of which 15.6% had children under the age of 18 living with them, 46.9% were married couples living together, 3.1% had a female householder with no husband present, and 49.0% were non-families. 39.6% of all households were made up of individuals, and 15.6% had someone living alone who was 65 years of age or older. The average household size was 2.04 and the average family size was 2.76. In the community, the population was spread out, with 14.3% under the age of 18, 6.6% from 18 to 24, 24.0% from 25 to 44, 36.7% from 45 to 64, and 18.4% who were 65 years of age or older. The median age was 49 years. For every 100 females, there were 94.1 males. For every 100 females, age 18 and over, there were 100.0 males.

The median income for a household in the community was $37,500, and the median income for a family was $51,458. Males had a median income of $26,339 versus $23,750 for females. The per capita income for the CDP was $22,845. None of the families and 4.2% of the population were living below the poverty line, including no under 18s and 15.2% of those over 64.

== Notable person ==
- Spencer Fisher, former UFC fighter

== See also ==
- National Register of Historic Places listings in Jackson County, North Carolina
