= National Register of Historic Places listings in Macon County, North Carolina =

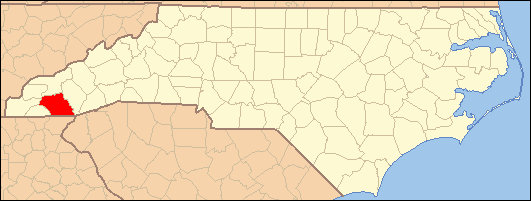

This list includes properties and districts listed on the National Register of Historic Places in Macon County, North Carolina. Click the "Map of all coordinates" link to the right to view an online map of all properties and districts with latitude and longitude coordinates in the table below.

== Current listings ==
This National Park Service list is complete through NPS recent listings posted May 15, 2026.

	Name on the Register	Image	Date listed	Location	City or town	Description
1	Baldwin-Coker Cottage	Baldwin-Coker Cottage	May 9, 2003 (#03000390)	226 Lower Lake Rd. 35°03′19″N 83°11′13″W	Highlands	
2	Dr. Alexander C. Brabson House	Dr. Alexander C. Brabson House	August 23, 1990 (#90001312)	SR 1118, 0.6 mile S. of jct. with SR 1115; 35°04′45″N 83°23′54″W	Otto	
3	Albert Swain Bryson House	Albert Swain Bryson House	December 20, 1984 (#84000541)	Pine Lane; 35°11′02″N 83°22′35″W	Franklin	
4	Cabin Ben	Cabin Ben	April 22, 2003 (#03000299)	115 Cullasaja Dr. 35°03′50″N 83°12′36″W	Highlands	
5	Church of the Incarnation	Church of the Incarnation	May 16, 1996 (#96000566)	111 N. 5th St. 35°03′07″N 83°11′45″W	Highlands	
6	Cowee Mound and Village Site	Cowee Mound and Village Site	January 18, 1973 (#73002238)	Address Restricted; 35°15′55″N 83°25′03″W	West's Mill	
7	Cowee-West's Mill Historic District	Cowee-West's Mill Historic District	January 8, 2001 (#00001569)	Address Restricted; 35°15′45″N 83°24′33″W	Franklin	
8	Downtown Franklin Historic District		May 21, 2026 (#100013052)	15-104 East Main Street; 5-81 West Main Street; 268 East Palmer Street; 25 Phillips Street; 35°11′00″N 83°22′36″W	Franklin	
9	Edwards Hotel	Edwards Hotel	November 20, 1992 (#92001614)	Jct. of Main and Fourth Sts., SE corner 35°03′07″N 83°11′50″W	Highlands	
10	First Presbyterian Church	First Presbyterian Church	August 22, 1996 (#96000925)	471 Main St. 35°03′06″N 83°11′48″W	Highlands	
11	Franklin Presbyterian Church	Franklin Presbyterian Church	February 5, 1987 (#86003718)	45 Church St. 35°10′57″N 83°23′02″W	Franklin	
12	Franklin Terrace Hotel	Franklin Terrace Hotel	July 29, 1982 (#82003483)	67 Harrison Ave. 35°11′01″N 83°23′02″W	Franklin	
13	Glen Choga Lodge		April 23, 1996 (#96000538)	50 Lodge Rd. 35°11′27″N 83°40′50″W	Aquone	
14	Thomas Grant Harbison House	Thomas Grant Harbison House	April 30, 2008 (#08000368)	2930 Walhalla Rd. 35°01′45″N 83°11′33″W	Highlands	
15	Highlands Inn	Highlands Inn	December 18, 1990 (#90001916)	Jct. of Main and Fourth Sts. 35°03′10″N 83°11′48″W	Highlands	
16	Highlands North Historic District	Highlands North Historic District	July 28, 2011 (#11000482)	608-650,507-615 Hickory St., 760-856,827 N. 5th St., 23-29,425 Brock Ct.,802,850-854 N. 4th St., 29 Martha's Ln. 35°03′30″N 83°11′40″W	Highlands	
17	Nequasee	Nequasee	November 26, 1980 (#80004598)	Main St. 35°11′06″N 83°22′25″W	Franklin	Site 31MA1
18	Pendergrass Building	Pendergrass Building	September 26, 1991 (#91001469)	6 W. Main St. 35°10′47″N 83°22′53″W	Franklin	
19	Playmore-Bowery Road Historic District		March 27, 2002 (#01001071)	1309-1311 Horse Cove Rd., 7,215,225,369,455 and 172-176,200,462 Bowery Rd., and 375-471 Upper Lake Rd. 35°03′14″N 83°10′37″W	Highlands	
20	Elizabeth Wright Prince House	Elizabeth Wright Prince House	April 17, 2017 (#100000901)	524 N. 4th St. 35°03′19″N 83°11′50″W	Highlands	
21	Saint Agnes Church	Saint Agnes Church	June 4, 1987 (#87000822)	27 Church St. 35°10′59″N 83°22′58″W	Franklin	
22	Salem Methodist Church	Salem Methodist Church	May 8, 2013 (#13000247)	1201 River Rd. 35°08′57″N 83°18′55″W	Franklin	
23	Satulah Mountain Historic District		October 5, 1995 (#95001155)	Roughly bounded by NC 28, Satulah, Brooks, Worley, Warren, and Old Walhalla Rd. 35°02′33″N 83°11′52″W	Highlands	
24	Jesse R. Siler House	Jesse R. Siler House	April 29, 1982 (#82003484)	115 W. Main St. 35°10′51″N 83°23′10″W	Franklin	
25	Skyline Lodge		April 13, 2022 (#100007591)	470 Skyline Lodge Rd. 35°04′36″N 83°12′45″W	Highlands vicinity	
26	Wilson Log House	Wilson Log House	May 20, 1998 (#98000545)	NC 1621, 1.4 miles northwest of its junction with NC 1620; 35°02′44″N 83°16′23″W	Highlands	

== See also ==
- National Register of Historic Places listings in North Carolina
- List of National Historic Landmarks in North Carolina
