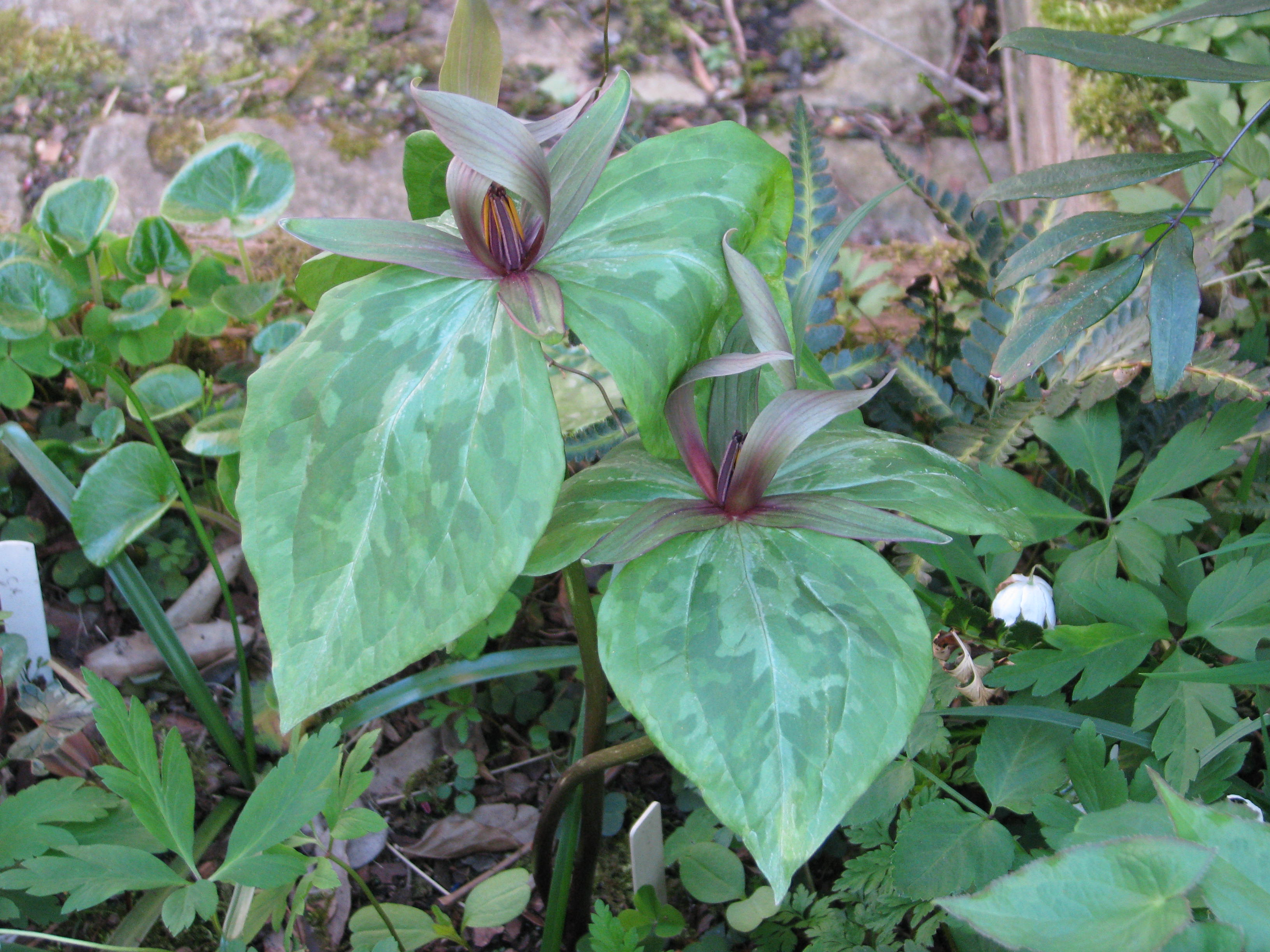

Conservation status
- Apparently Secure (NatureServe)

Scientific classification
- Kingdom: Plantae
- Clade: Tracheophytes
- Clade: Angiosperms
- Clade: Monocots
- Order: Liliales
- Family: Melanthiaceae
- Genus: Trillium
- Species: T. ludovicianum

Binomial name
- Trillium ludovicianum Harb.

= Trillium ludovicianum =

Species of flowering plant

Trillium ludovicianum, the Louisiana wakerobin or Louisiana trillium, is a species of flowering plant in the family Melanthiaceae. It is found only in the south-central United States, in Louisiana, Mississippi, and eastern Texas.

== Description ==
Trillium ludovicianum is a perennial herbaceous plant up to 12 inches (30 cm) tall. Flowers are dark red, purple, or dark green, sometimes with irregular markings. The plant grows in moist woods and floodplains.

Within ten days after the flower opens, the height of the plant (on average) will increase by 50%. In that same period, the length of the petals will almost double.

== Taxonomy ==
Trillium ludovicianum was named and described by the American botanist Thomas Grant Harbison in 1901.

== Bibliography ==
- Case, Frederick W.; Case, Roberta B. (1997). Trilliums. Portland, Oregon: Timber Press. ISBN 978-0-88192-374-2.
- Harbison, Thomas G. (1901). "New or little known species of Trillium". Biltmore Botanical Studies. 1 (1): 19–24.
