= Church of the Incarnation =

Church of the Incarnation may refer to:

- Church of the Incarnation (Dallas, Texas)
- Church of the Incarnation (Amite, Louisiana)
- Church of the Incarnation, Episcopal (Manhattan)
- Church of the Incarnation, Roman Catholic (Manhattan)
- Church of the Incarnation (Highlands, North Carolina)
- Church of the Incarnation (Minneapolis, Minnesota)
- Church of the Incarnation (Charlottesville, Virginia)
- Church of the Incarnation, Episcopal (Santa Rosa, California)
