= Baldwin-Coker Cottage =

Historic house in North Carolina, United States

- U.S. National Register of Historic Places
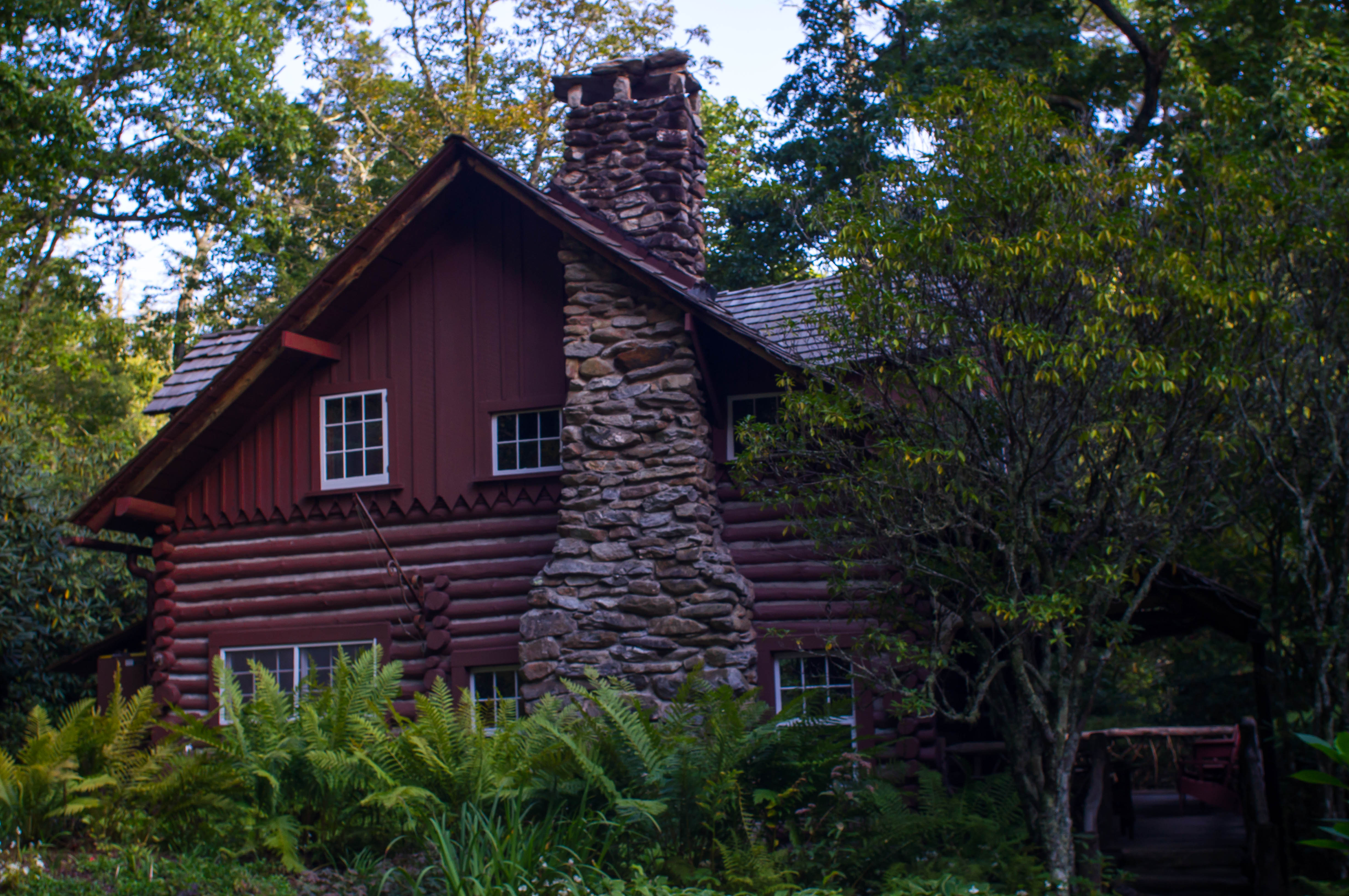

- Location within North Carolina Location within the United States
- Location: 226 Lower Lake Rd., Highlands, North Carolina
- Coordinates: 35°3′19″N 83°11′13″W
- Area: 1.1 acres (0.45 ha)
- Built: 1925
- Built by: Joe Webb
- Architect: James John Baldwin
- Architectural style: Rustic
- NRHP reference No.: 03000390
- Added to NRHP: May 9, 2003

The Baldwin-Coker Cottage is a historic house at 266 Lower Lake Road in Highlands, North Carolina. The Rustic-style 1 1/2-story log house was designed and built in 1925 by James John Baldwin, an architect from Anderson, South Carolina. The cottage is important as a prototype for a number of later houses that were built by members of the construction crew. The walls are constructed of notched logs, whose ends project at random-length intervals, both at the corners of the house, and from the interior, where logs are also used to partition the inside space. The house is topped by a side-gable wood shingle roof. The main gable ends, and the gables of the dormers, are clad in board-and-batten siding. A porch with naturalistic limb-and-twig railings spans the width of the main facade.

The house was listed on the National Register of Historic Places in 2003.

== See also ==
- National Register of Historic Places listings in Macon County, North Carolina
