= Wilson Log House =

Historic house in North Carolina, United States

- U.S. National Register of Historic Places
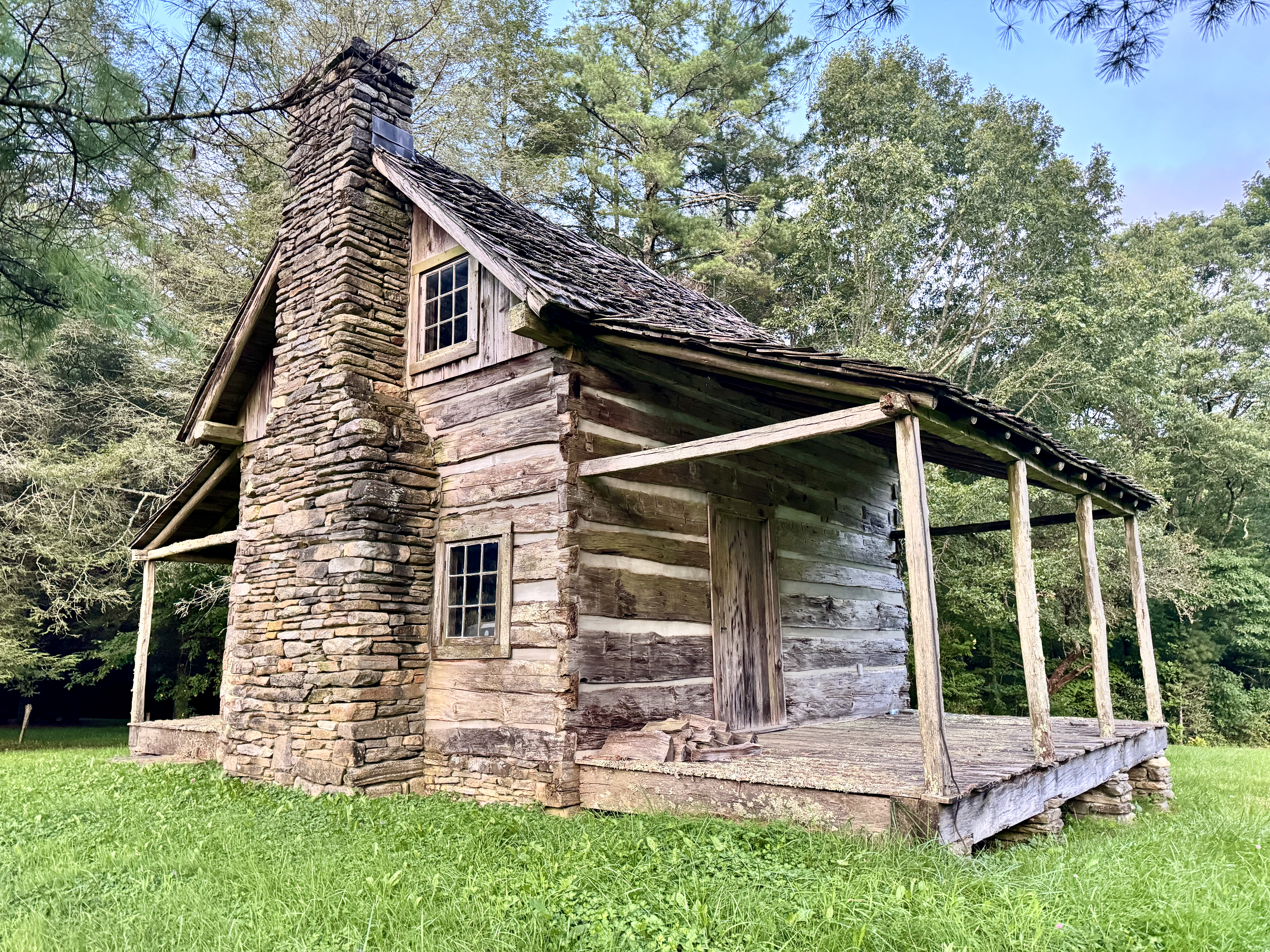
- The Wilson Log House in August 2024

- Location within North Carolina Location within the United States
- Location: NC 1621, 1.4 miles northwest of its junction with NC 1620, near Highlands, North Carolina
- Coordinates: 35°2′43″N 83°16′24″W
- Area: less than one acre
- Built: 1882
- Architectural style: single-pen log cabin
- MPS: Macon County MPS
- NRHP reference No.: 98000545
- Added to NRHP: May 20, 1998

The Wilson Log House is an historic house in rural Macon County, North Carolina. It is a single story log structure, located west of Highlands, on the west side of State Route 1621 (Hickory Gap Road), 1.4 miles northwest of its junction with Route 1620. It was built c. 1882 by Jeremiah Wilson, and is one of a small number of period log buildings to survive in the county. The house remained in the Wilson family until the 1950s. It measures about 18' by 20', and is constructed from logs with dovetail joins, and red mud chinking. Its interior consists of a single large chamber, with a stair rising on one side to a loft area under the gable roof. At some point a frame addition was added to the rear of the house, but that has since been removed.

The house was listed on the National Register of Historic Places in 1998, at which time it was undergoing a historically sensitive restoration.

== See also ==
- National Register of Historic Places listings in Macon County, North Carolina
