= Highlands Inn =

- U.S. National Register of Historic Places
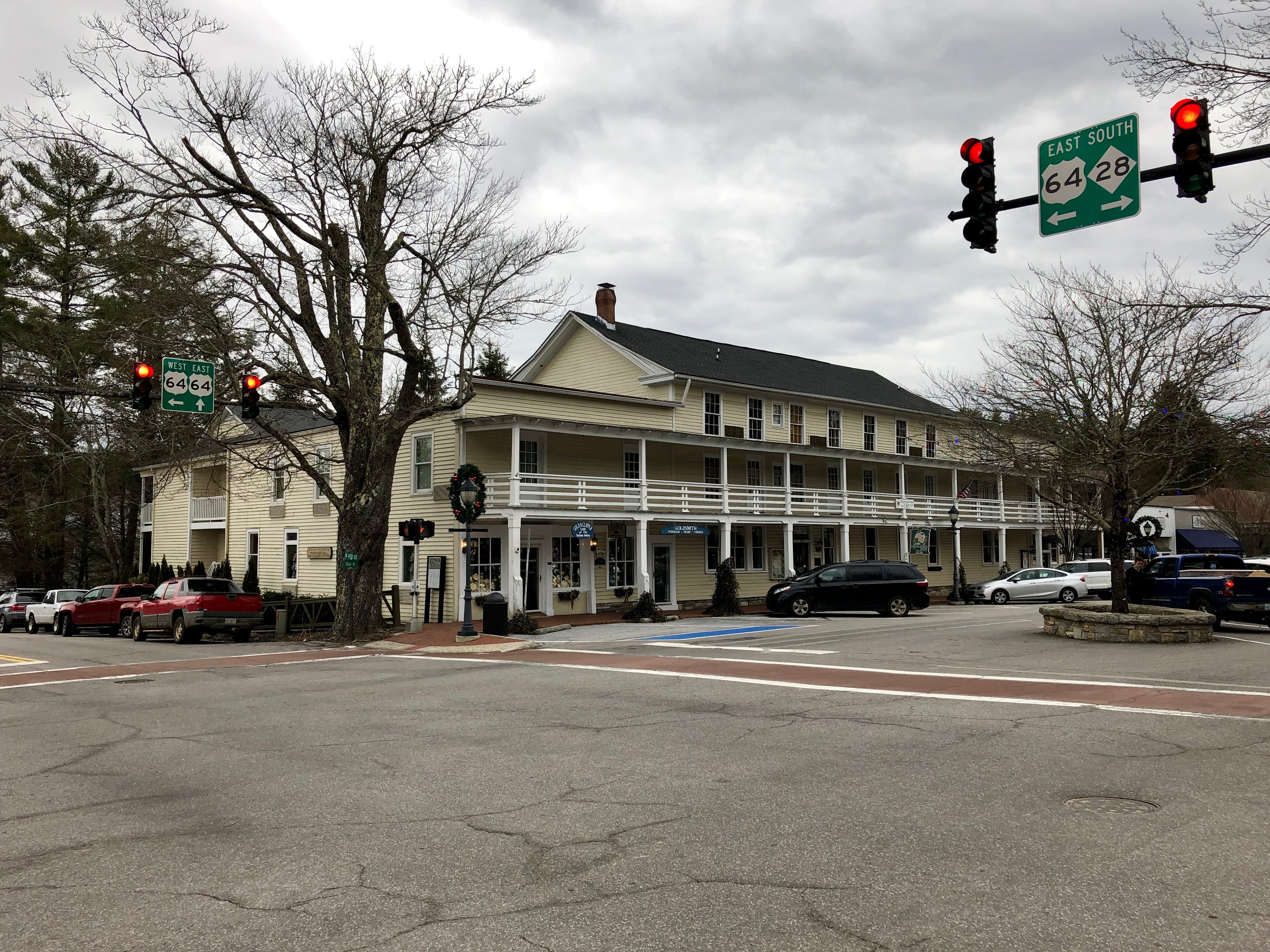
- Highlands Inn, January 2019

- Location within North Carolina Location within the United States
- Location: Jct. of Main and Fourth Sts., Highlands, North Carolina
- Coordinates: 35°3′10″N 83°11′48″W
- Area: 0.5 acres (0.20 ha)
- Built: 1880
- Architectural style: Late Victorian, Vernacular Late Victorian
- NRHP reference No.: 90001916
- Added to NRHP: December 18, 1990

The Highlands Inn is a historic hotel at the corner of 4th and Main Streets in Highlands, North Carolina. The main block of the hotel is a three-story late Victorian structure built in 1880, with a two-story porch across the main facade. Over the course of the 20th century a number of alterations and additions have been made to this structure, to increase services and rooms. It is one of the oldest continuously operating hotels in the highlands of western North Carolina.

The building was listed on the National Register of Historic Places in 1990.

== See also ==
- National Register of Historic Places listings in Macon County, North Carolina
