= Satulah Mountain Historic District =

Historic district in North Carolina, United States

- U.S. National Register of Historic Places
- U.S. Historic district
- Location within North Carolina Location within the United States
- Location: Roughly bounded by NC 28, Satulah, Brooks, Worley, Warren and Old Walhalla Rd., Highlands, North Carolina
- Coordinates: 35°2′33″N 83°11′52″W
- Area: 188 acres (76 ha)
- Architect: Labouisse, Samuel; Webb, Joe
- Architectural style: Bungalow/craftsman, Late 19th And Early 20th Century American Movements, American Four-Square
- NRHP reference No.: 95001155
- Added to NRHP: October 5, 1995

The Satulah Mountain Historic District is a residential historic district in Highlands, North Carolina. It is located in the southwestern part of the city, bounded on the north and west by Walhalla Road, on the east by properties on Satulah Road. The area is located on the slopes of Satulah Mountain, and was most significantly developed in the early decades of the 20th century, although the earliest development took place not long after Highlands was founded in 1875. There are a number of log houses, and rustic styling using log and fieldstone elements is common in the area. Many houses have Craftsman features.

The district was listed on the National Register of Historic Places in 1995.

== See also ==
- National Register of Historic Places listings in Macon County, North Carolina
