= Dr. Alexander C. Brabson House =

Historic house in North Carolina, United States

- U.S. National Register of Historic Places
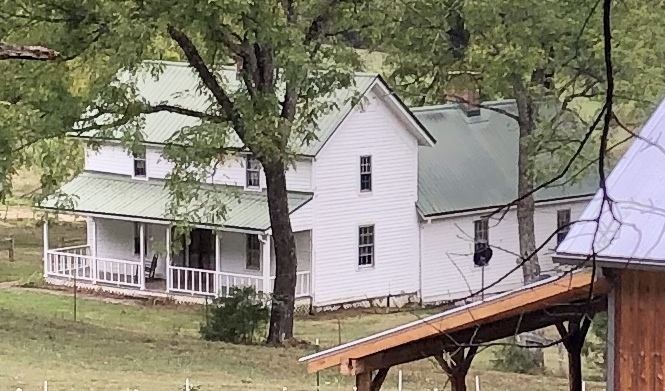
- The Brabson House photographed in 2019.

- Location within North Carolina Location within the United States
- Location: SR 1118, 0.6 mile S. of jct. with SR 1115, near Otto, North Carolina
- Coordinates: 35°4′43″N 83°23′25″W
- Area: 39 acres (16 ha)
- Built: 1884
- Architectural style: Vernacular 19th-20th century
- NRHP reference No.: 90001312
- Added to NRHP: August 23, 1990

The Dr. Alexander C. Brabson House is a historic house in rural Macon County, North Carolina. It is located off Academy Road (SR 1117) near the community of Otto.

== Description and history ==
The house consists of a 2 1/2-story main block with a side gable roof, and a rear single-story ell. A shed-roof porch extends across the main facade, in which a pair of windows flank a double-leaf door. The house was built in 1884 by Dr. Alexander C. Brabson, a longtime local country doctor known for his treatment of milk sickness.

The house was listed on the National Register of Historic Places on August 23, 1990.

== See also ==
- National Register of Historic Places listings in Macon County, North Carolina
