= Highlands North Historic District =

Historic district in North Carolina, United States

- U.S. National Register of Historic Places
- U.S. Historic district
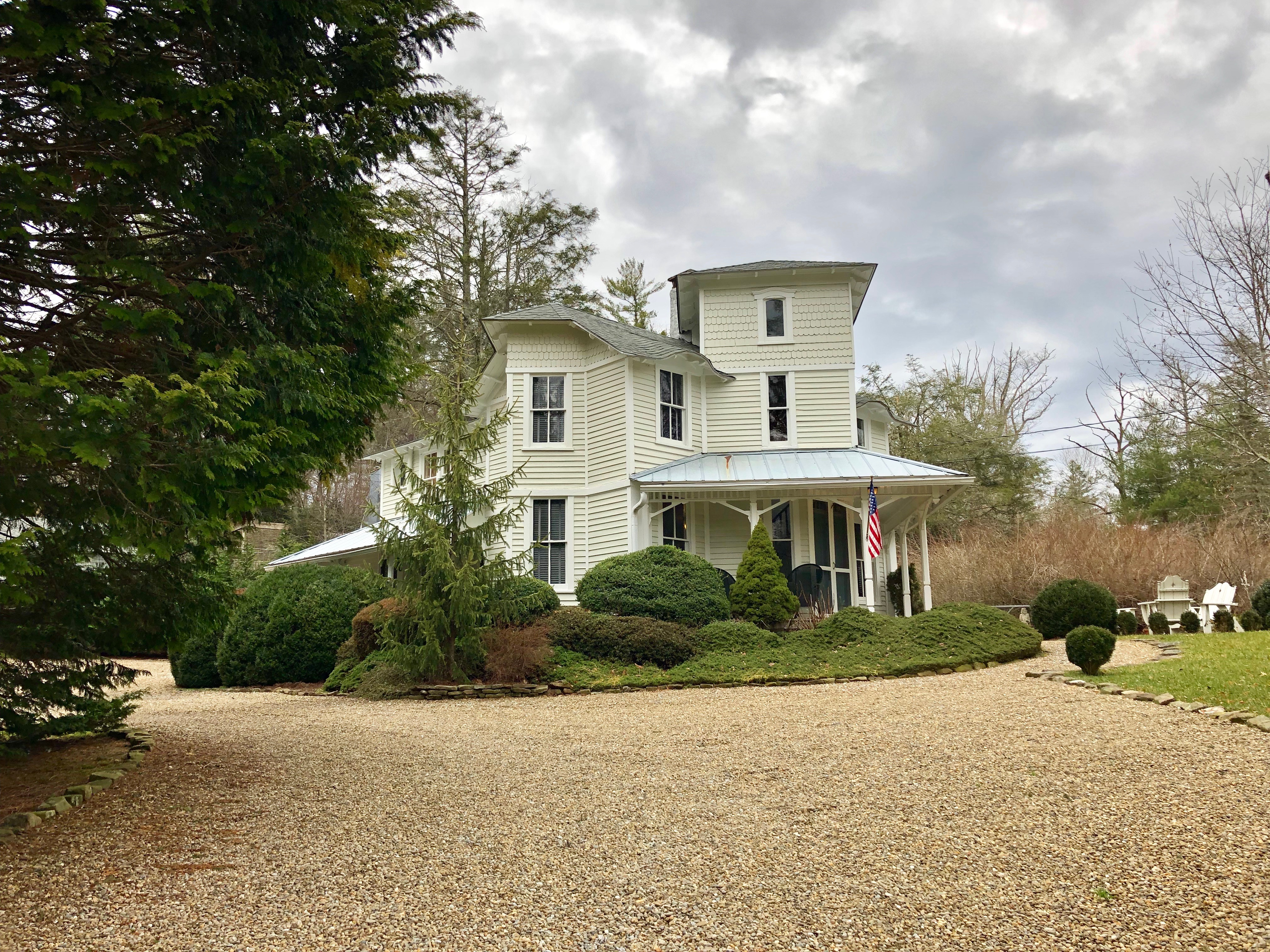
- John Zeigler Gottwals House on North 4th Street

- Location within North Carolina Location within the United States
- Location: 608-650,507-615 Hickory St., 760-856,827 N. 5th St., 23-29,425 Brock Ct.,802,850-854 N. 4th St., 29 Martha's Ln., Highlands, North Carolina
- Coordinates: 35°3′30″N 83°11′40″W
- Area: 60 acres (24 ha)
- NRHP reference No.: 11000482
- Added to NRHP: July 28, 2011

The Highlands North Nistoric District encompasses the historic heart of Highlands, North Carolina, a summer resort town high in the state's western mountains. Its 60 acres (24 ha) include some of the first permanent year-round settlements in the town (established 1875), as well as a high concentration of its oldest surviving structures. It is laid out north of Main Street, the commercial heart of the town, roughly between North 4th Street (United States Route 64) and North 5th Street.

The district was listed on the National Register of Historic Places in 2011.

== See also ==
- National Register of Historic Places listings in Macon County, North Carolina
