= Cabin Ben =

Historic house in North Carolina, United States

- U.S. National Register of Historic Places
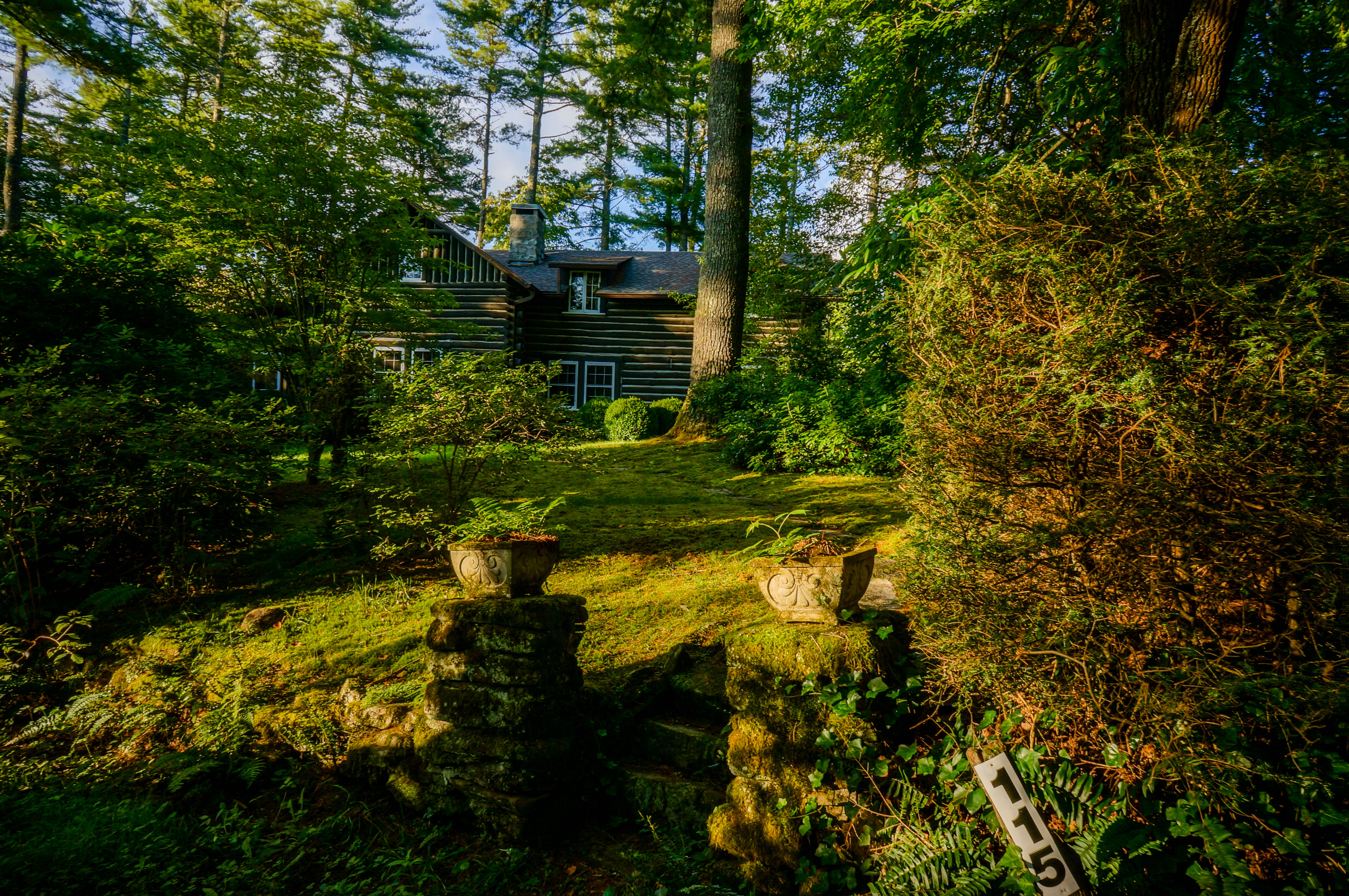

- Location within North Carolina Location within the United States
- Location: 115 Cullasaja Dr., Highlands, North Carolina
- Coordinates: 35°3′50″N 83°12′36″W
- Area: 1.1 acres (0.45 ha)
- Built: 1932
- Built by: Joe Webb
- Architect: Rudolph Edward Lee
- Architectural style: Rustic style
- NRHP reference No.: 03000299
- Added to NRHP: April 22, 2003

Cabin Ben is a historic log house at 115 Cullasaja Drive in Highlands, North Carolina. The house consists of two rectangular sections, joined at an offset. The smaller of the two sections houses a large living room, while the larger section houses the kitchen, dining, and bedroom areas. The house was designed by Clemson University professor of architecture Rudolph Edward Lee for a family friend, Miss Anne England, and was built in 1932 by Joe Webb, a locally prominent builder of log houses. It is a relatively unaltered example of Webb's work, having been designed to house relatively large family gatherings. It has remained in the hands of England descendants.

The house was listed on the National Register of Historic Places in 2003.

== See also ==
- National Register of Historic Places listings in Macon County, North Carolina
