= First Presbyterian Church (Highlands, North Carolina) =

Historic church in North Carolina, United States

- U.S. National Register of Historic Places
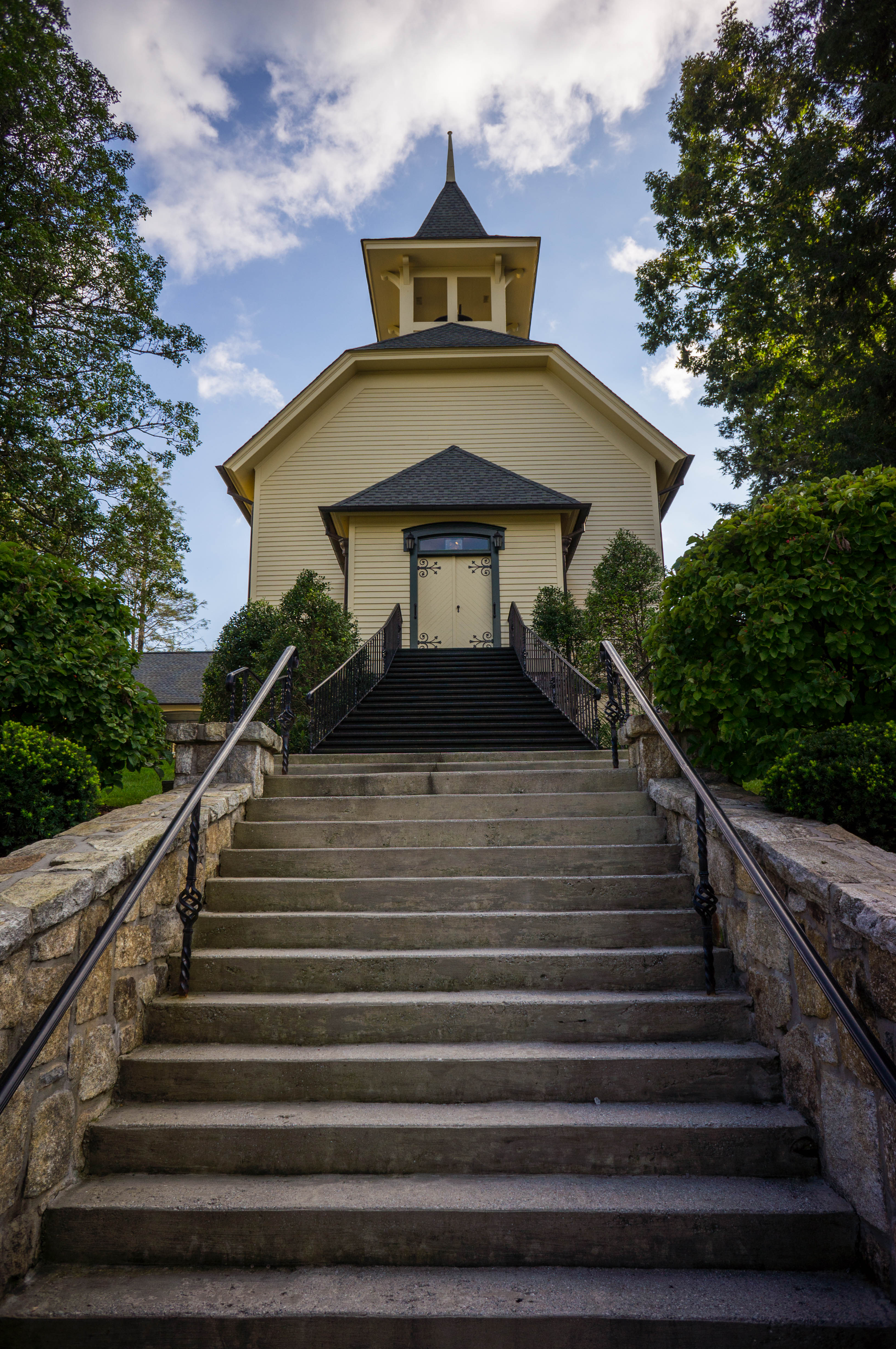

- Location within North Carolina Location within the United States
- Location: 471 Main St., Highlands, North Carolina
- Coordinates: 35°3′6″N 83°11′48″W
- Area: 1 acre (0.40 ha)
- Built: 1885
- Architect: Wright, Marion; Parker, Thomas F.
- Architectural style: Italianate
- NRHP reference No.: 96000925
- Added to NRHP: August 22, 1996

The First Presbyterian Church is a historic church at 471 Main Street in Highlands, North Carolina. The single story wood-frame church was built in 1883–85, and occupies a prominent site in downtown Highlands, surrounded by a period picket fence. It is the oldest church in the city, and was built by Marion Wright, a local master builder. It is stylistically a vernacular interpretation of Italianate architecture, which is most prominent in its belfry tower, which features a flared roof with extended bracketed eaves.

The building was listed on the National Register of Historic Places in 1996.

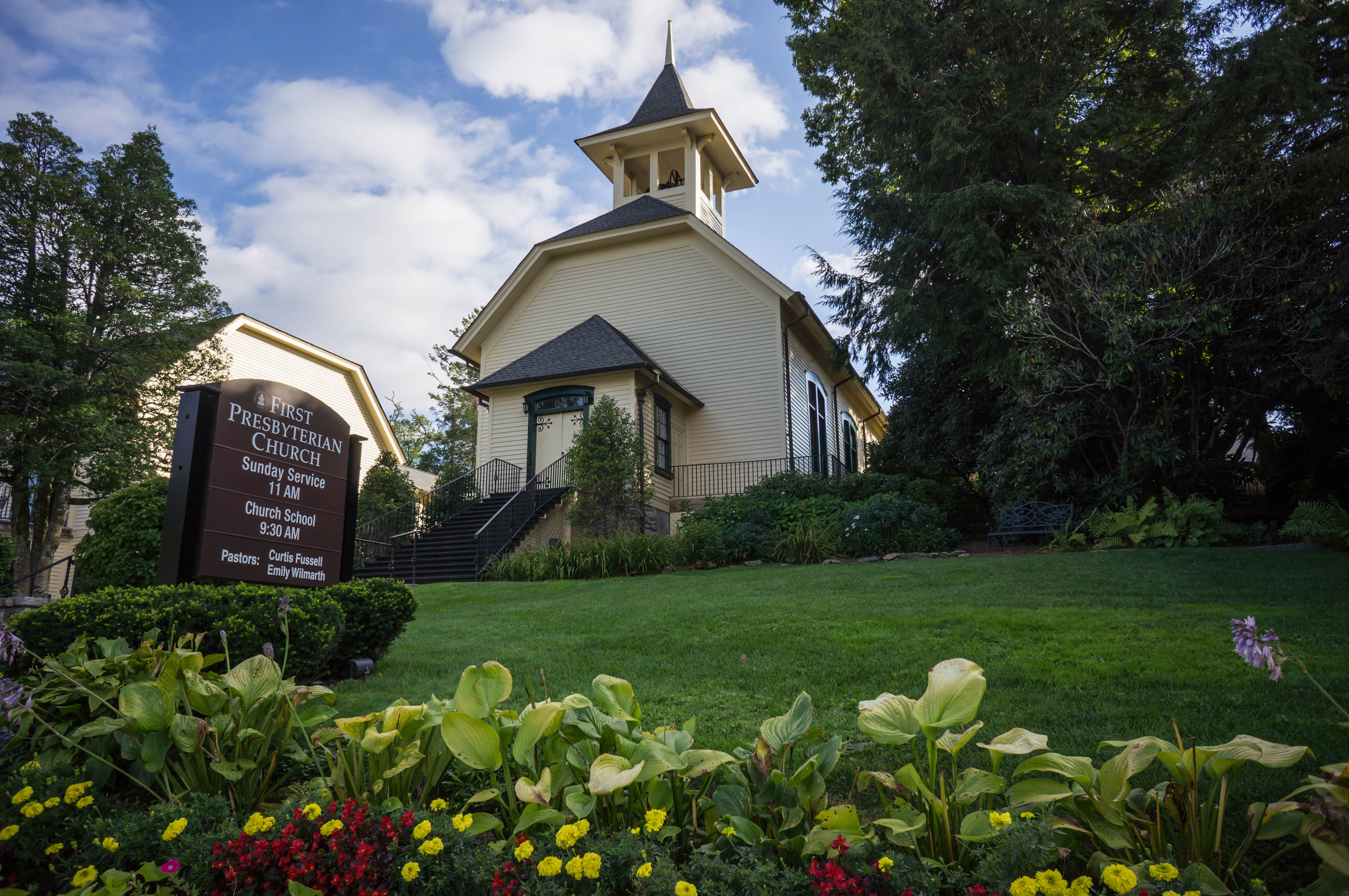
Another view of the front of the church

== See also ==
- National Register of Historic Places listings in Macon County, North Carolina
