= Edwards Hotel =

Edwards Hotel may refer to:

- King Edward Hotel (Jackson, Mississippi), also known as Edwards Hotel, listed on the NRHP in Mississippi
- Edwards Hotel (Highlands, North Carolina), listed on the NRHP in North Carolina
