= Playmore–Bowery Road Historic District =

Historic district in North Carolina, United States

- U.S. National Register of Historic Places
- U.S. Historic district
- Location within North Carolina Location within the United States
- Location: 1309-1311 Horse Cove Rd., 7,215,225,369,455 and 172-176,200,462 Bowery Rd., and 375-471 Upper Lake Rd., Highlands, North Carolina
- Coordinates: 35°3′14″N 83°10′37″W
- Area: 220 acres (89 ha)
- NRHP reference No.: 01001071
- Added to NRHP: March 27, 2002

The Playmore–Bowery Road Historic District is a residential historic district composed of a collection of summer resort houses in the hills east of Highlands, North Carolina. The principal estate in the area, called Playmore, was established by the Ravenel family in 1879–80; it is situated on 140 acres (57 ha) south of Horse Cove Road. Bowery Road roughly parallels Horse Cove Road to the north, and is lined with a series of wood-frame summer that were built between about 1880 and 1930.

The district is listed on the National Register of Historic Places in 2002.

== See also ==
- National Register of Historic Places listings in Macon County, North Carolina
