= St. Agnes Episcopal Church =

Historic church in Franklin, North Carolina, United States

- Saint Agnes Church
- U.S. National Register of Historic Places
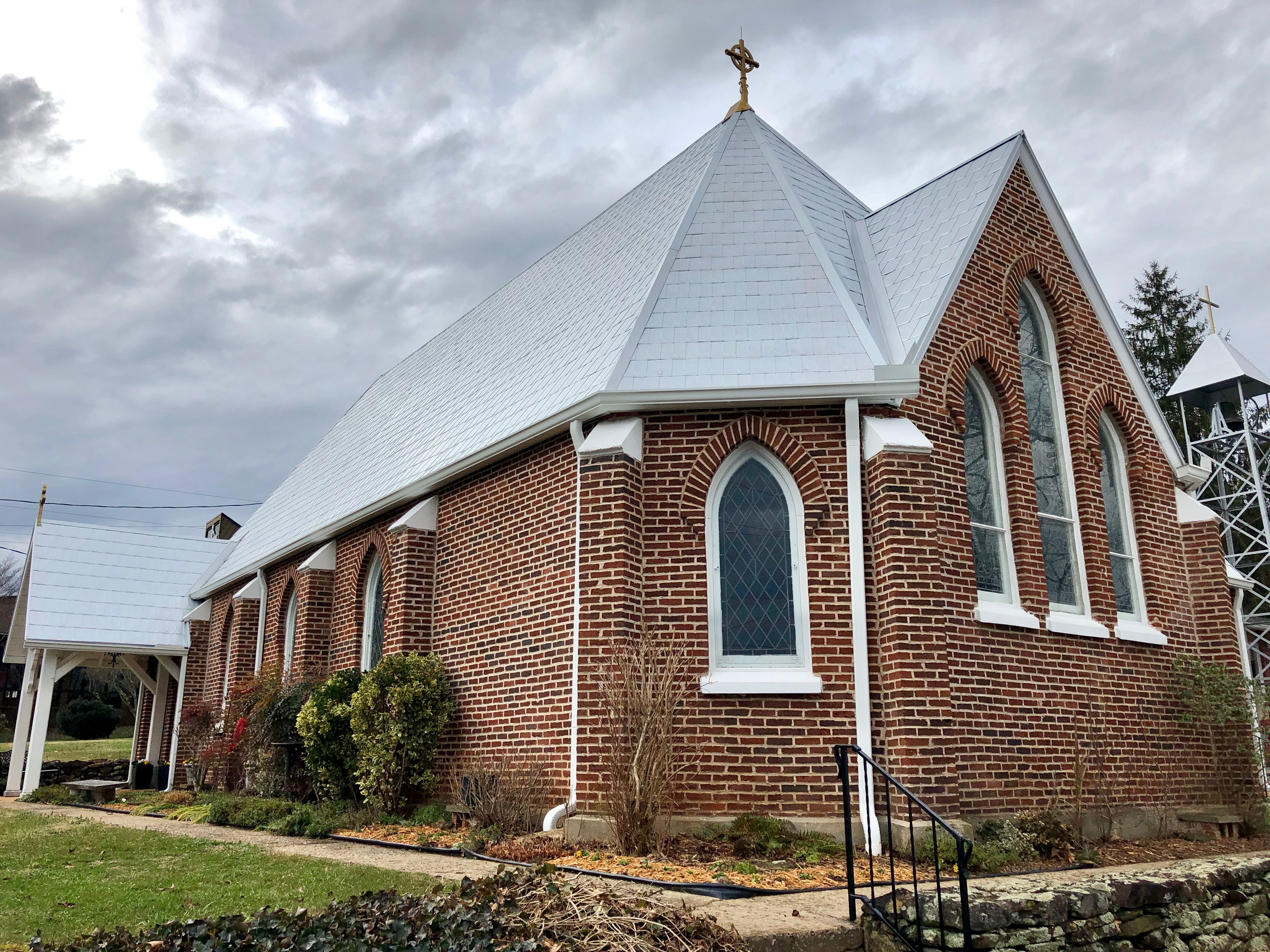
- St. Agnes Episcopal Church, January 2019

- Location within North Carolina Location within the United States
- Location: 27 Church St. Franklin, North Carolina
- Coordinates: 35°10′59″N 83°22′58″W
- Area: 0.6 acres (0.24 ha)
- Built: 1888
- Architect: William Gould Bulgin
- Architectural style: Late Gothic Revival
- NRHP reference No.: 87000822
- Added to NRHP: June 04, 1987

Saint Agnes Episcopal Church is a historic building located in Franklin, North Carolina, United States. It is a Chapel of All Saints Episcopal Church. From 1888 until 2014 St. Agnes was its own Episcopal Parish but in November of that year it officially merged with St. Cyprian's Episcopal Church to form an entirely new parish: All Saints Episcopal Church. All Saints is one congregation making use of two buildings: St. Agnes Chapel and St. Cyprian's Chapel. They use their website and Facebook to publish their worship schedule and keep parishioners and visitors up to date on where worship will be each Sunday.

The Chapel is an historic redbrick Gothic Revival Episcopal church building located at 66 Church Street in Franklin, Macon County, North Carolina. Built in 1888, it was designed by architect William Gould Bulgin. The Rev. John A. Deal, the first Episcopal missioner in Macon County, was responsible for founding Saint Agnes as well as Incarnation in Highlands. On June 4, 1987, it was added to the National Register of Historic Places.

== See also ==
- National Register of Historic Places listings in Macon County, North Carolina
