= Cliffside =

Cliffside may refer to:

- Cliffside (Palisades, New York), a historic home
- Cliffside (Scottsville, Virginia), a historic home
- Cliffside, North Carolina, United States, an unincorporated community
- Cliffside, Texas, United States, an unincorporated community
- Cliffside, Toronto, Canada, a neighborhood

== See also ==
- Cliffside Hose Company No. 4
- Cliffside Lake Recreation Area
- Cliffside Park, New Jersey
- Cliffside Railroad
- Cliffside railway station
