= Pendergrass Building =

Historic building in North Carolina, US

- U.S. National Register of Historic Places
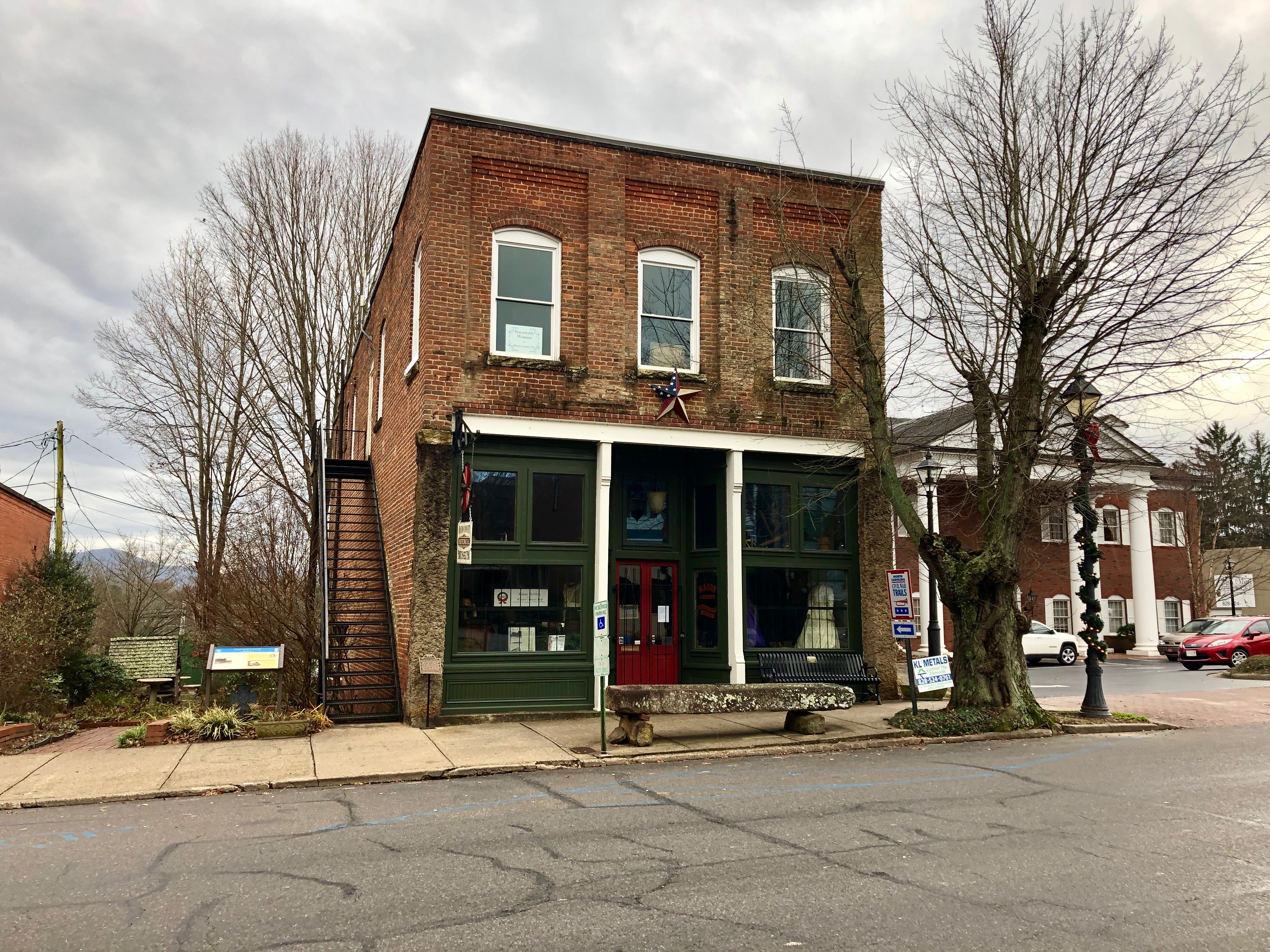
- Pendergrass Building, January 2019

- Location within North Carolina
- Location: 6 W. Main St., Franklin, North Carolina
- Coordinates: 35°10′47″N 83°22′53″W
- Area: 0.1 acres (0.040 ha)
- Built: 1904
- Architectural style: Early Commercial
- NRHP reference No.: 91001469
- Added to NRHP: September 26, 1991

The Pendergrass Building is a historic commercial building at 6 West Main Street in Franklin, North Carolina. The two-story brick building was built in 1904, and is a virtually unaltered example of retail construction of the period. It was used as a retail store until 1975.

The building is now home to the Macon County Historical Society and Museum.

The building was listed on the National Register of Historic Places in 1991.

== See also ==
- National Register of Historic Places listings in Macon County, North Carolina
