= Jesse R. Siler House =

Historic house in North Carolina, United States

- U.S. National Register of Historic Places
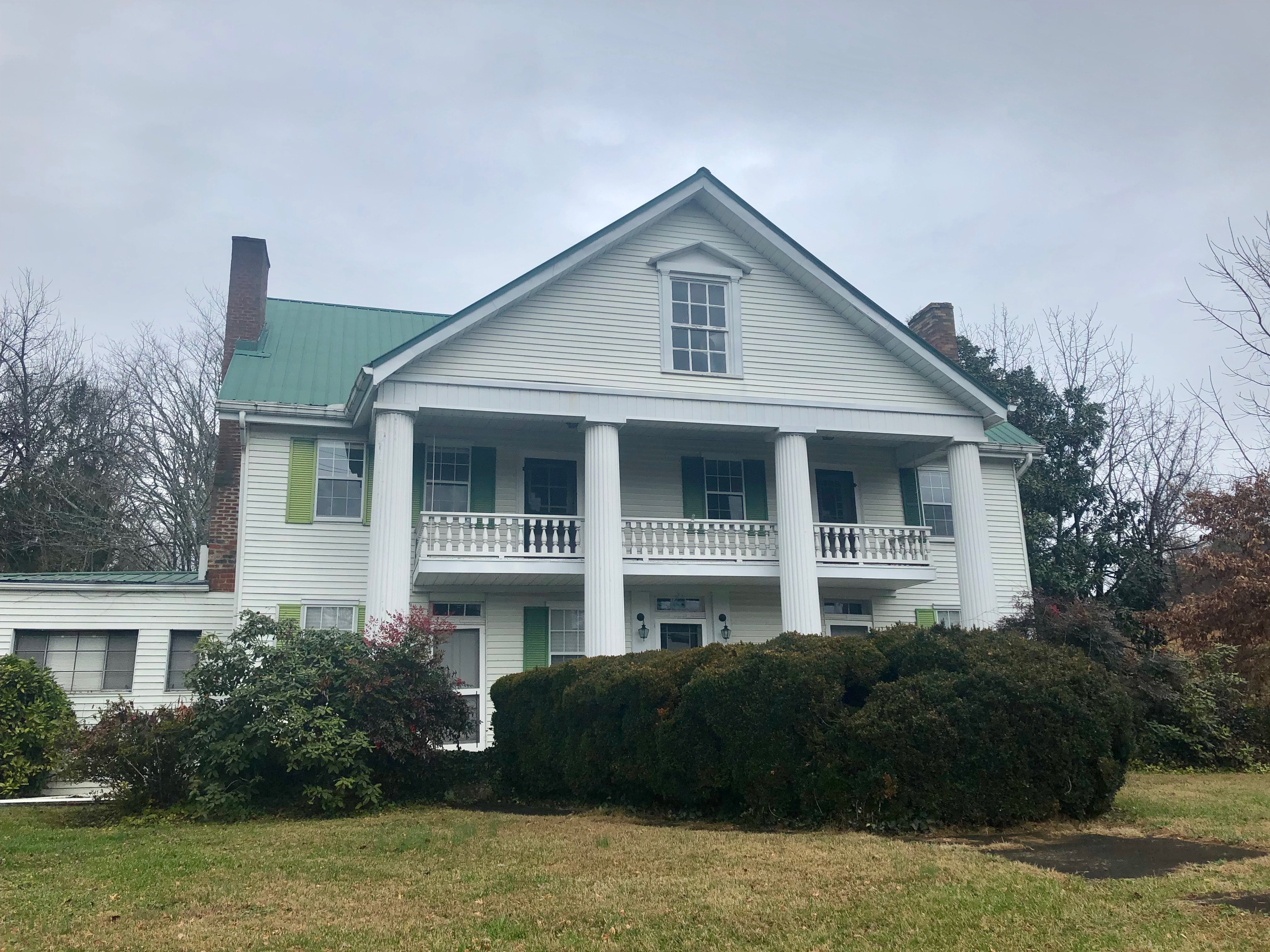
- Jesse R. Siler House, January 2019

- Location within North Carolina Location within the United States
- Location: 115 W. Main St., Franklin, North Carolina
- Coordinates: 35°10′51″N 83°23′10″W
- Area: 2 acres (0.81 ha)
- Built: 1820
- Architectural style: Georgian, Federal
- NRHP reference No.: 82003484
- Added to NRHP: April 29, 1982

The Jesse R. Siler House is a historic house at 115 West Main Street in Franklin, North Carolina. It is prominently sited at the base of the hill on which most of the city is located. A two-story log structure was built on this site c. 1819, and expanded between 1820 and 1830 by Jesse Siler, a prominent early settler of the area. It was modified significantly over the 19th century, most notably receiving a prominent Greek Revival tetrastyle portico. It retains many interior features from Siler's period of modification, exhibiting transitional Georgian-Federal styling in its mantels.

The house was listed on the National Register of Historic Places in 1982.

== See also ==
- National Register of Historic Places listings in Macon County, North Carolina
