= First Presbyterian Church (Franklin, North Carolina) =

Historic church in North Carolina, US

- Franklin Presbyterian Church
- U.S. National Register of Historic Places
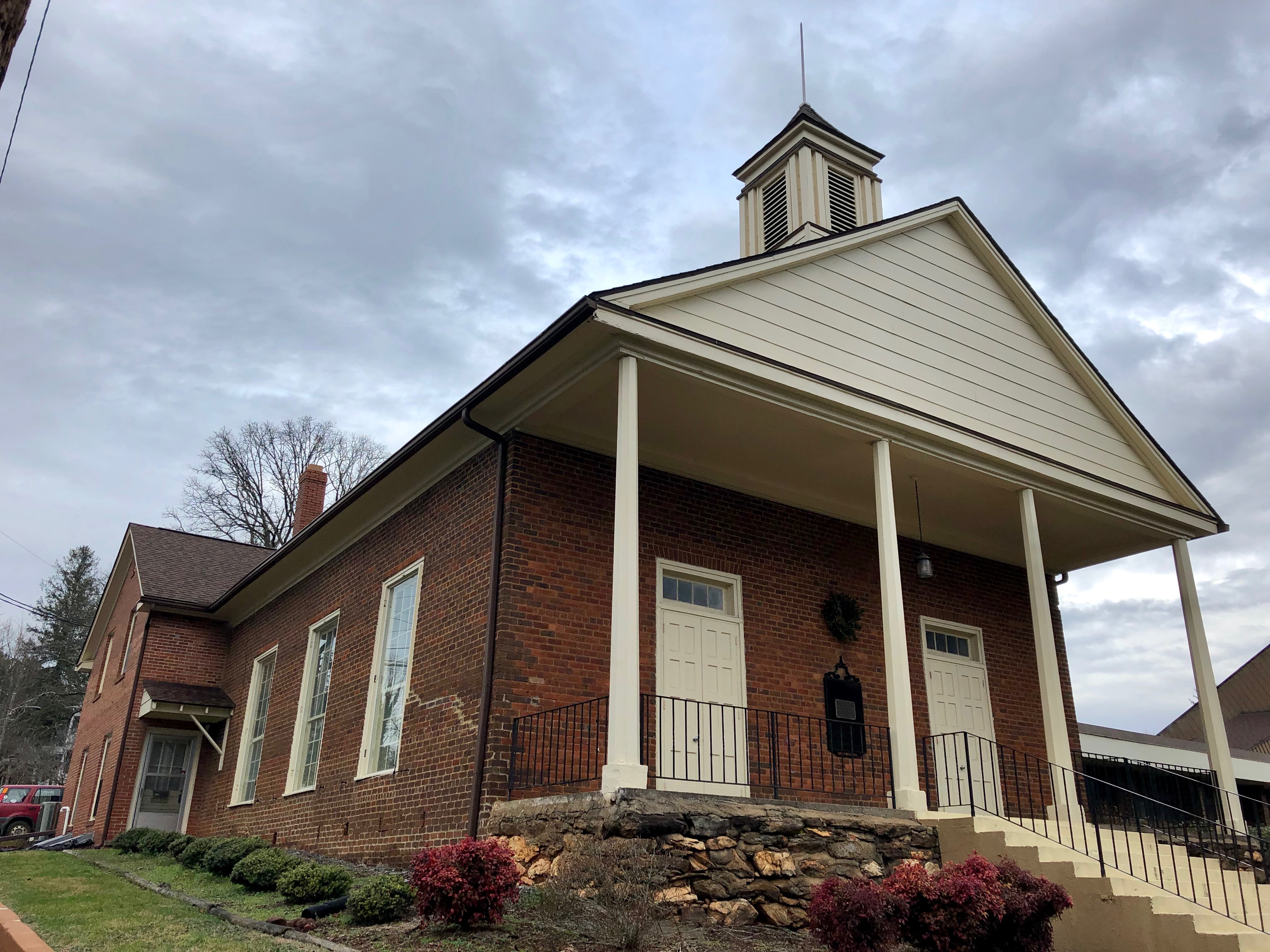
- Franklin First Presbyterian Church, January 2019

- Location within North Carolina Location within the United States
- Location: 45 Church St., Franklin, North Carolina
- Coordinates: 35°10′57″N 83°23′2″W
- Area: 0.8 acres (0.32 ha)
- Built: 1856
- Architectural style: Vernacular Greek Revival
- NRHP reference No.: 86003718
- Added to NRHP: February 5, 1987

First Presbyterian Church, formerly the Franklin Presbyterian Church, is a church in Franklin, North Carolina, United States. It was built in 1856 and added to the National Register of Historic Places in 1987. In 1993, it was rewired, fitted with HVAC and given new interior walls.

== See also ==
- National Register of Historic Places listings in Macon County, North Carolina
