= Edwards Hotel (Highlands, North Carolina) =

Historic building in North Carolina, US

- Hotel Edwards
- U.S. National Register of Historic Places
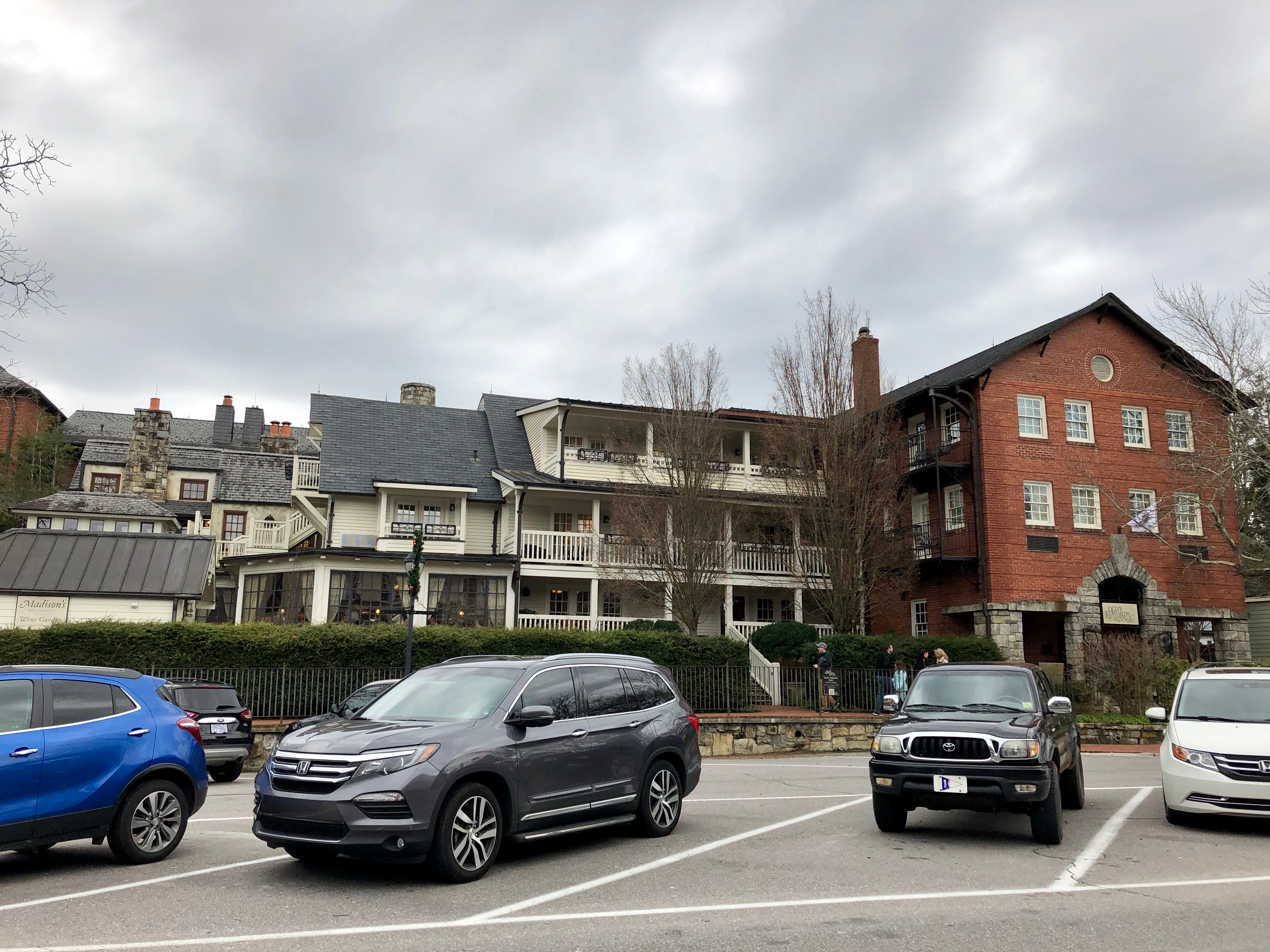
- Old Edwards Inn, January 2019

- Location within North Carolina Location within the United States
- Location: Jct. of Main and Fourth Sts., SE corner, Highlands, North Carolina
- Coordinates: 35°3′7″N 83°11′50″W
- Area: 0.3 acres (0.12 ha)
- Built: 1880
- Built by: Wilton H. Cobb
- Architect: Linton H. Young
- Architectural style: Italian Alpine
- NRHP reference No.: 92001614
- Added to NRHP: November 20, 1992

The Hotel Edwards was a historic hotel building at Main and 4th Streets in Highlands, North Carolina. The main block of the hotel, a three-story brick structure, was built in 1935. It was attached to a c. 1880 2 1/2-story wood-frame structure, which was operated for many years as a boarding house or hostelry, and is now the historic main inn for Old Edwards Inn and Spa. The brick block was designed by Linton H. Young, and was built after the construction of the Highlands Country Club brought an influx of summer visitors to the area. The property was operated as a hotel by the Edwards family from 1914 to 1970 and is now owned by Art and Angela Williams (A.L. Williams) of Palm Beach, FL. .

The building was listed on the National Register of Historic Places in 1992.

== See also ==
- National Register of Historic Places listings in Macon County, North Carolina
