= Church of the Incarnation (Highlands, North Carolina) =

Historic church in North Carolina, United States

- U.S. National Register of Historic Places
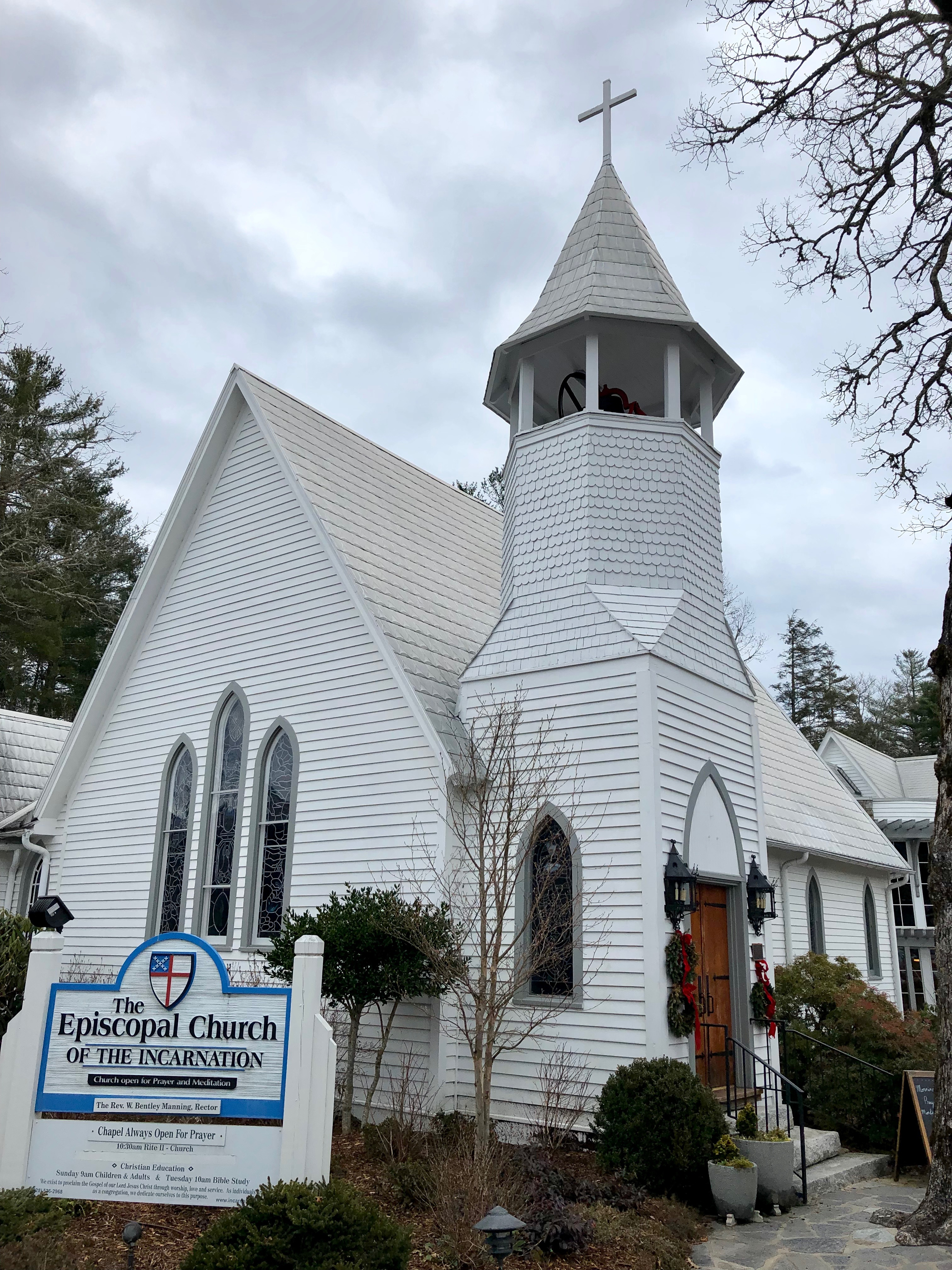
- Church of the Incarnation, January 2019

- Location within North Carolina Location within the United States
- Location: 520 N. 5th St., Highlands, North Carolina
- Coordinates: 35°3′7″N 83°11′45″W
- Area: 0.2 acres (0.081 ha)
- Built: 1896
- Built by: W.B. McGuire
- Architectural style: Carpenter Gothic
- NRHP reference No.: 96000566
- Added to NRHP: May 16, 1996

The Church of the Incarnation built in 1896 is a historic Carpenter Gothic Episcopal church building located at 111 North 5th Street in Highlands, Macon County, North Carolina.

The Rev. John A. Deal, the first Episcopal missioner in Macon County, was responsible for founding the Church of the Incarnation as well Saint Agnes Episcopal Church in Franklin, the county seat. Its first building, a Victorian Gothic Revival wood-frame building, was built in 1896; it was listed on the National Register of Historic Places in 1996. In 2002, a new sanctuary was built on the property and the 1896 building became the chapel.

In 2020, the parish commissioned Cram & Ferguson, the well-known ecclesiastical architectural firm, to undertake a significant renovation of the church. The project aimed to enhance the worship experience by expanding seating capacity in the main sanctuary, achieving architectural consistency throughout the building, incorporating Christian iconography into the main sanctuary and Nave, and opening our doors to the community (including the installation of a new door to the sanctuary and bell tower on Main Street).

The Church of the Incarnation is still an active parish in the Episcopal Diocese of Western North Carolina. The Rev. Bentley Manning is the Rector of the parish.

== See also ==
- National Register of Historic Places listings in Macon County, North Carolina
