= Glen Choga Lodge =

Historic house in North Carolina, United States

- U.S. National Register of Historic Places
- Location within North Carolina Location within the United States
- Location: 50 Choga Lodge Rd., near Aquone, North Carolina
- Coordinates: 35°11′27″N 83°40′50″W
- Area: 18.4 acres (7.4 ha)
- Built: 1935
- Architectural style: Adirondack
- NRHP reference No.: 96000538
- Added to NRHP: April 23, 1996

The Glen Choga Lodge is a historic lodge in rural Macon County, North Carolina. It is located in a clearing on the south side of Little Choga Road (North Carolina Route 1402), in Nantahala National Forest. The lodge is a large U-shaped two-story log structure with a metal roof. The Glen Choga Lodge is the only saddle notched Adirondack-style lodge made of Wormy Chesnut Logs known to still exist. It was built in 1934–35, at a time when Little Choga Road was a major route between Franklin and Murphy, North Carolina. The builders were Alexander Breheurs Steuart and his wife Margaret Willis Hays; they operated the lodge as a summer vacation destination until 1941 and the United States entry into World War II. It did not reopen for commercial use after the war, and has been converted into a private summer residence.

== See also ==
- National Register of Historic Places listings in Macon County, North Carolina
