= Franklin Terrace Hotel =

Historic building in North Carolina, US

- U.S. National Register of Historic Places
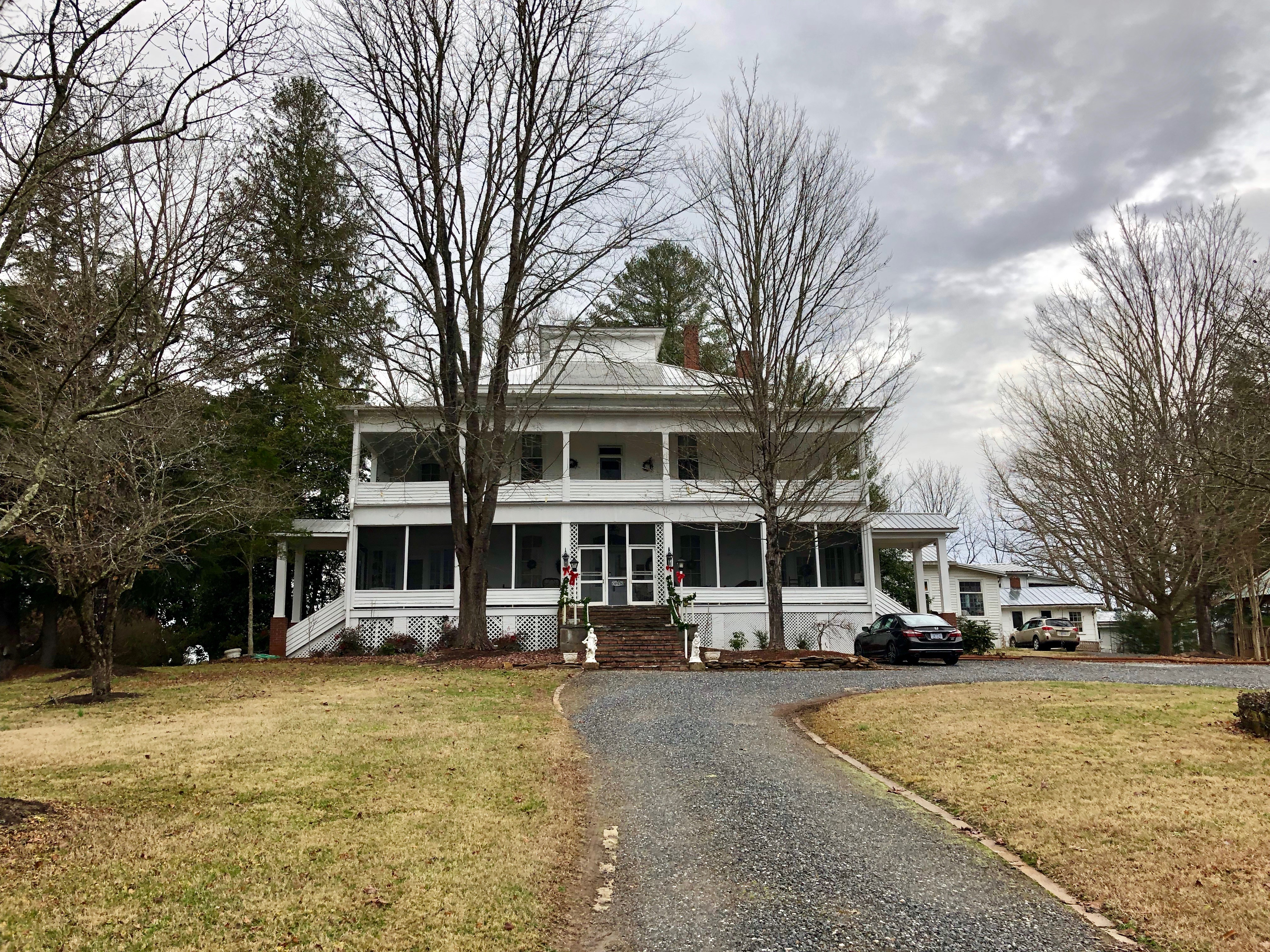
- Franklin Terrace Inn, January 2019

- Location within North Carolina Location within the United States
- Location: 67 Harrison Ave., Franklin, North Carolina
- Coordinates: 35°11′1″N 83°23′2″W
- Area: 2 acres (0.81 ha)
- Built: 1888
- Architectural style: Italianate
- NRHP reference No.: 82003483
- Added to NRHP: July 29, 1982

The Franklin Terrace Hotel is a historic hotel at 67 Harrison Avenue in Franklin, North Carolina. The two story stuccoed-brick building was built in 1888, originally to serve as a girls boarding school. In 1902 it began serving as a local public school, and in 1915 it was converted into a tourist hotel. The building is T-shaped, with a three-bay central pavilion projecting from the main rectangular block. A two-story wooden porch (probably added during the hotel conversion) wraps around this central pavilion, with massive square posts and a solid weatherboard balustrade.

The hotel was listed on the National Register of Historic Places in 1982.

== See also ==
- National Register of Historic Places listings in Macon County, North Carolina
