= Thomas Grant Harbison House =

Historic house in North Carolina, United States

- U.S. National Register of Historic Places
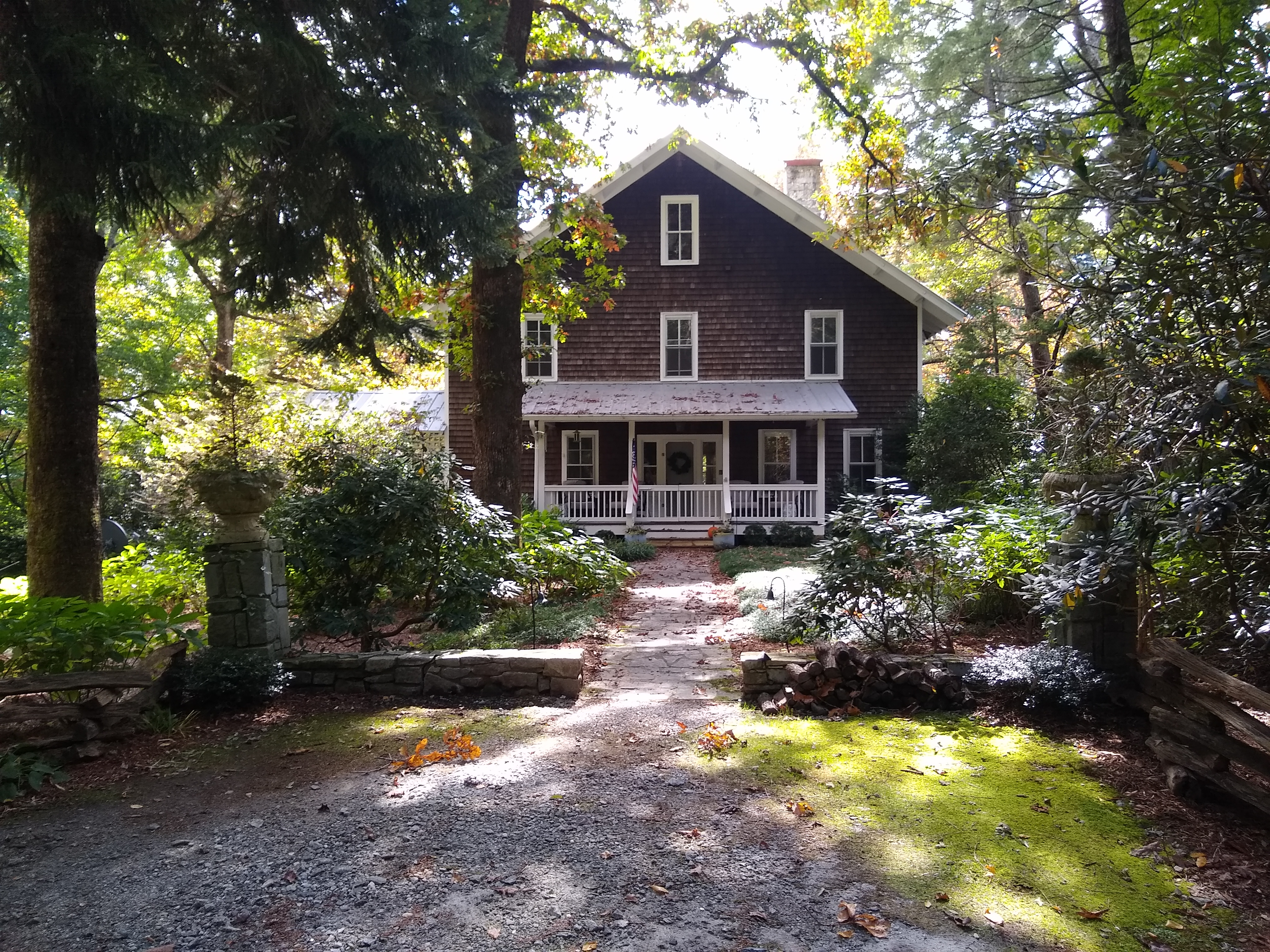

- Location within North Carolina Location within the United States
- Location: 2930 Walhalla Rd., near Highlands, North Carolina
- Coordinates: 35°1′45″N 83°11′33″W
- Area: 3.3 acres (1.3 ha)
- Built: 1921
- Architect: Cleaveland, William Monroe
- Architectural style: Bungalow/craftsman
- NRHP reference No.: 08000368
- Added to NRHP: April 30, 2008

The Thomas Grant Harbison House is a historic house at 2930 Walhalla Road, just outside Highlands, North Carolina. The two-story wood-frame house was built in 1921 for the botanist Thomas Grant Harbison (1862-1936), who was responsible for some of the surviving plantings, including a stand of the endangered Torreya taxifolia, on the extant 3.3-acre (1.3 ha) property. The south (street-facing) facade is five bays across, with a two-story porch sheltering the center three bays and the entrance. The north-facing facade has a similar porch that is only a single story. The house remained in the Harbison family until 1985.

The house was listed on the National Register of Historic Places in 2008.

== See also ==
- National Register of Historic Places listings in Macon County, North Carolina
