= Salem Methodist Church (Franklin, North Carolina) =

Historic church in North Carolina, United States

- U.S. National Register of Historic Places
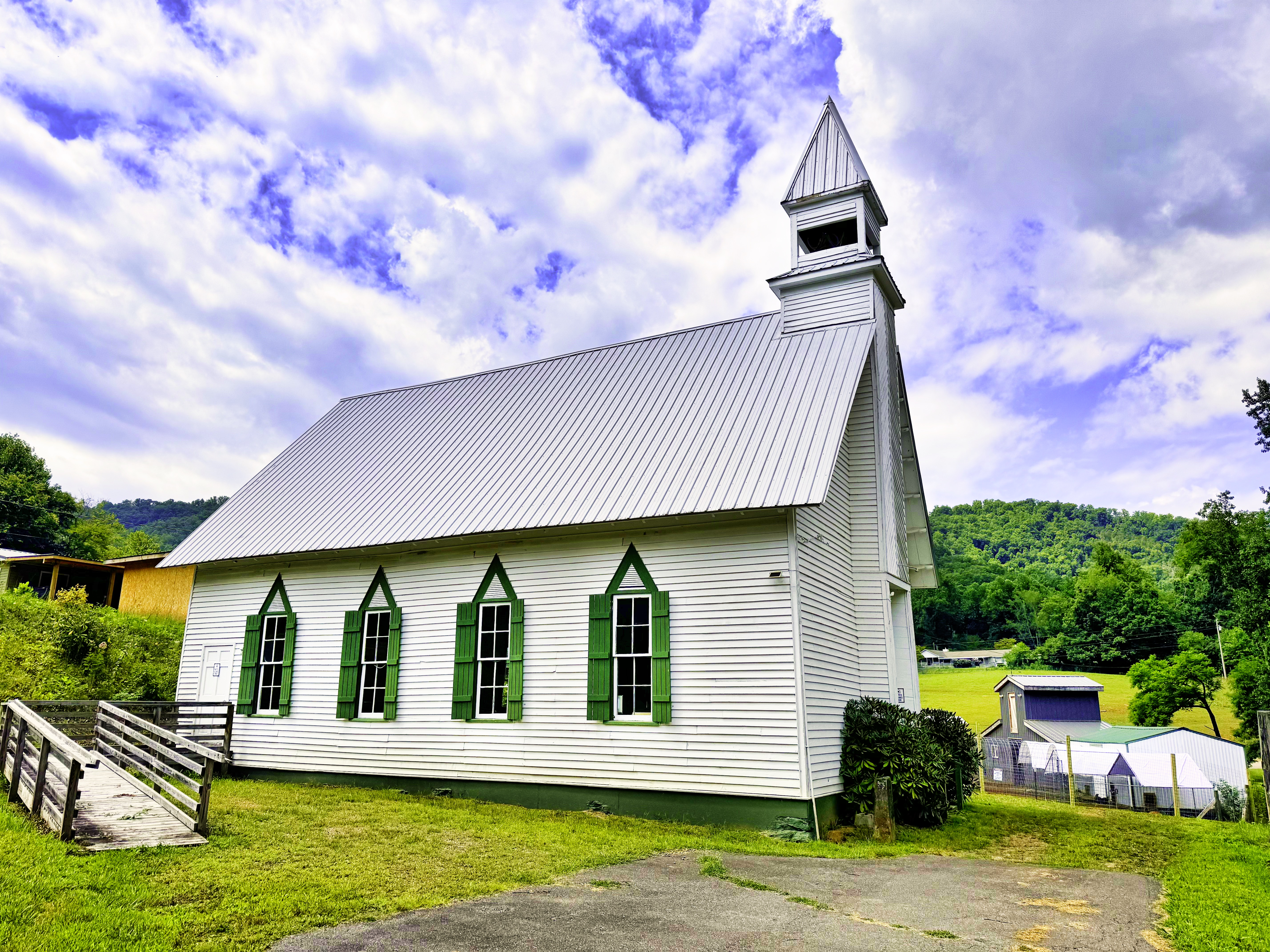
- The church in 2024, home to the Cullasaja Community Center

- Location within North Carolina Location within the United States
- Location: 1201 River Rd., Franklin, North Carolina
- Coordinates: 35°08′57″N 83°18′55″W
- Area: 0.75 acres (0.30 ha)
- Built: 1875
- NRHP reference No.: 13000247
- Added to NRHP: May 8, 2013

The Salem Methodist Church is a historic church building at 1201 River Road in Cullasaja, an unincorporated community near Franklin, North Carolina. It is a single-story wood-frame structure with a prominent central bell tower with vernacular Gothic Revival styling. It was built in 1875 for a Methodist congregation. It was the third church built in the site, and is the second-oldest church building in Macon County. It served as a Methodist church until 1972, and was adapted for use as a community hall in 1976.

The building was listed on the National Register of Historic Places in 2013.

== See also ==
- National Register of Historic Places listings in Macon County, North Carolina
