= Harris Lake (Highlands, North Carolina) =

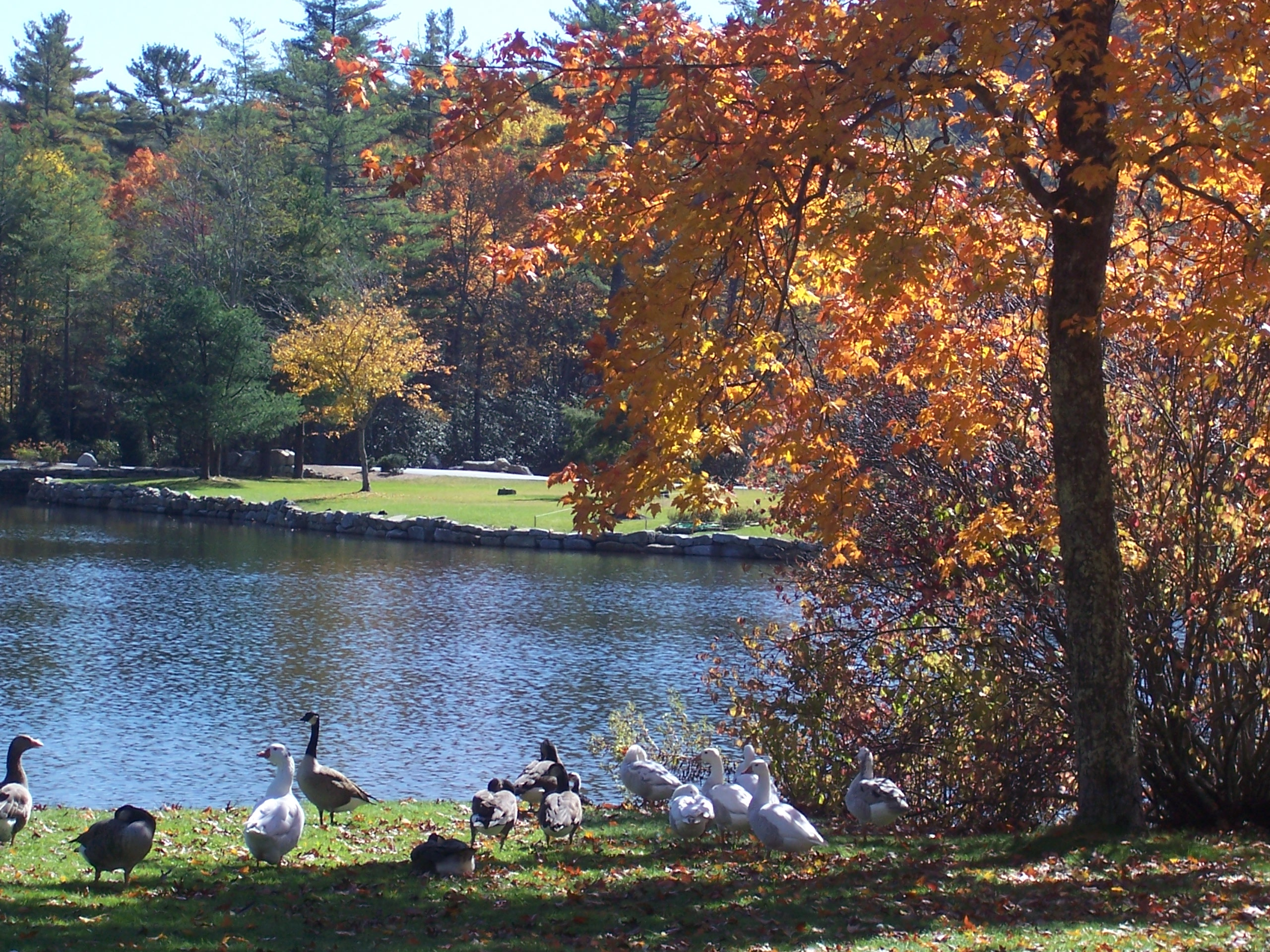
- Harris Lake in autumn.

- Location within North Carolina Location within the United States
- Location: Highlands, North Carolina
- Coordinates: 35°03′00″N 83°11′37″W
- Basin countries: United States
- Surface elevation: 3,829 ft (1,167 m)

Harris Lake is located just outside Downtown Highlands, North Carolina. It is a popular spot for fishing and picnicking. Harris Lake is home to many geese, swans and ducks.

Harris Lake is located at 35°03′00″N 83°11′37″W.

The town of Highlands operates Harris Lake Park.
