= Albert Swain Bryson House =

Historic house in North Carolina, United States

- U.S. National Register of Historic Places
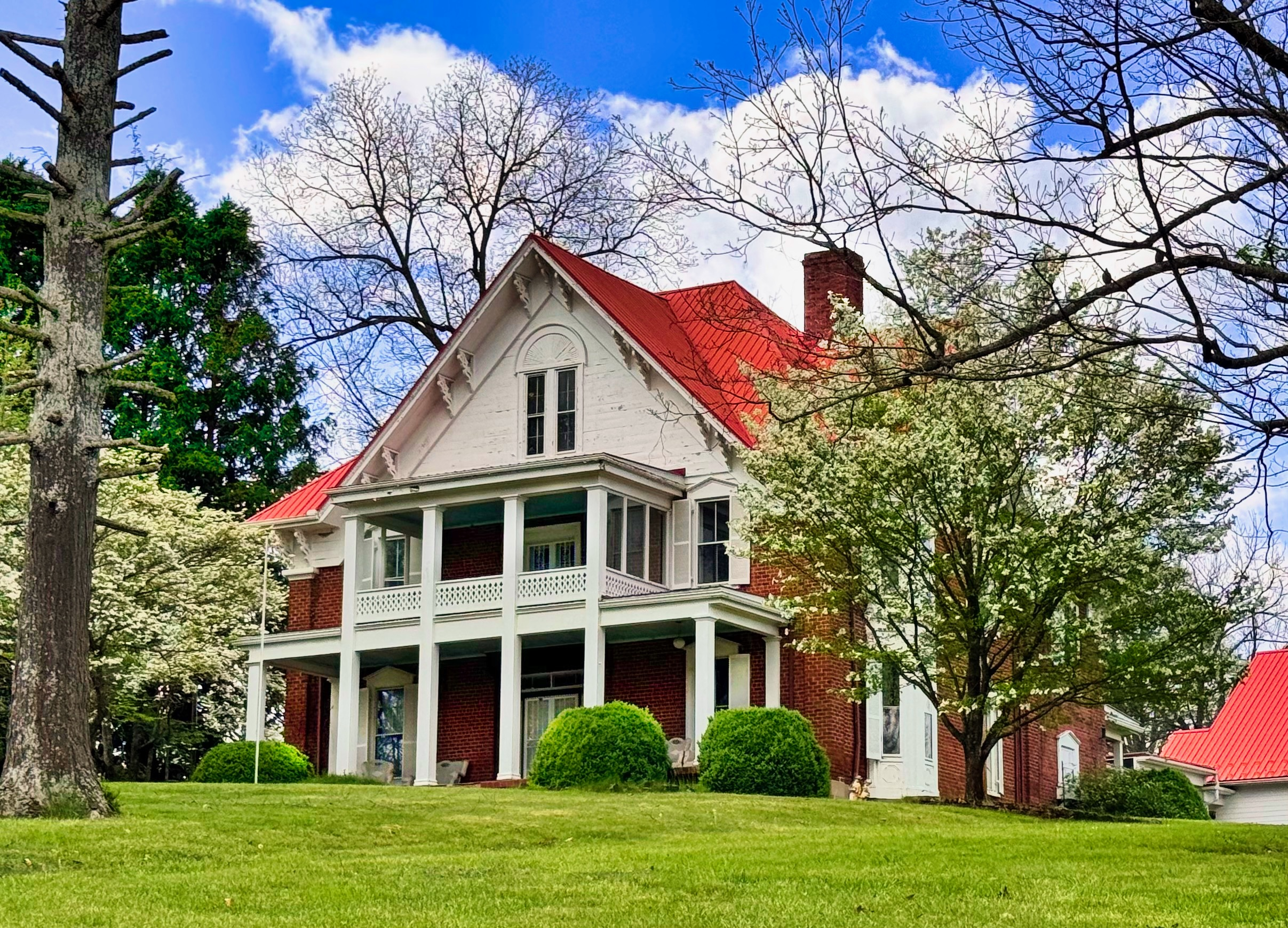
- Hall of the Pines

- Location within North Carolina Location within the United States
- Location: Pine Lane, Franklin, North Carolina
- Coordinates: 35°11′2″N 83°22′35″W
- Area: 1.5 acres (0.61 ha)
- Built: 1875
- Architectural style: Romantic Revival
- NRHP reference No.: 84000541
- Added to NRHP: December 20, 1984

The Albert Swain Bryson House, known locally as Hall of the Pines, is a historic house in Franklin, North Carolina. The 2 1/2-story brick and frame house occupies a prominent site on Pine Lane overlooking Main Street. It was built in the 1870s for Albert Swain Bryson, a prominent local farmer and magistrate. The house is a regionally rare example of vernacular Gothic and Italianate style, with steeply pitched gables decorated with paired brackets, and a two-level porch with delicate sawn balustrade.

The house was listed on the National Register of Historic Places in 1984.

== See also ==
- National Register of Historic Places listings in Macon County, North Carolina
