= Thomas Grant Harbison =

- Born: April 23, 1862; Union County, Pennsylvania
- Died: June 12, 1936 (aged 74)
- Scientific career
- Fields: Botany
- Author abbrev. (botany): Harb.

Thomas Grant Harbison (1862–1936) was an American botanist.

Harbison lived and worked in Union County, Pennsylvania until 1886 when he moved to North Carolina. He attended college during extended vacations, never registering for a continuous year. He attended classes at nearby Bucknell University. He read extensively and by the age of twenty-one he had acquired a personal library of over one thousand volumes. He took correspondence courses from the University of the City of New York and earned his B.S., A.M., and Ph.D. (in 1888) through correspondence courses from a correspondence school in Chicago. Kelsey had built a lake on the property, and while it was known to botanists as “Harbison’s Lake” for many years, it is now called “Harris Lake.”

In his early twenties, Harbison went on a walking tour of Maryland, Virginia, and North Carolina.

While visiting Highlands, NC on this excursion, he apparently impressed the residents with his knowledge so much that they later asked him to return as a school principal. He served in some educational capacity at Highlands from 1886 to 1896, with the exception of a trip to Europe to study educational systems in 1893-94.

From 1897 to 1903 he was employed as a collector for the Biltmore Herbarium operated by George Washington Vanderbilt II's Biltmore Estate. He made a collecting trip to eastern North Carolina in 1898. Charles Lawrence Boynton and Harbison collected in the Rocky Mountains of Colorado and New Mexico and also in the U.S. Pacific region. From 1905 to 1926 Harbison worked a field botanist (collecting southern woody plants) for Harvard University's Arnold Arboretum under the directorship of Charles Sprague Sargent. Harbison also worked for some years for the State Geological Survey of Mississippi making an exhaustive survey of Mississippi's native trees, especially those valuable for timber.

He was a close friend and correspondent of William Willard Ashe and in 1933 was employed in organizing the W. W. Ashe Herbarium. In 1934 Harbison was appointed the herbarium's curator and held that post until he died in 1936.

On 6 August 1896 in Macon County, North Carolina he married Jessamine "Jessie" Margrit Cobb (1868–1954). They had four children. The Thomas Grant Harbison House was built in 1921 and remained in the family until 1985.

== Eponyms ==
- Crataegus harbisonii (Harbison's hawthorn, discovered and named by Chauncey Beadle)
