= Cliffside Lake Recreation Area =

Recreation area in North Carolina, US

Coordinates: 35.0794°N 83.2368°W

The Cliffside Lake Recreation Area is located in Nantahala National Forest in the Appalachian Mountains of North Carolina. It offers both fishing and swimming and is less than ten miles northwest of Highlands, North Carolina, on State Road 28.
