= Otto, North Carolina =

- Unincorporated community
- Location within North Carolina Location within the United States
- Coordinates: 35°03′36″N 83°23′16″W
- Country: United States
- State: North Carolina
- County: Macon
- Elevation: 2,070 ft (630 m)
- Time zone: UTC-5 (Eastern (EST))
  - Summer (DST): UTC-4 (EDT)
- ZIP code: 28763
- Area code: 828
- GNIS feature ID: 1021766

Otto is an unincorporated community in Macon County, North Carolina, United States. Otto is located along U.S. Route 23, 8.4 miles (13.5 km) south of Franklin. Otto has a post office with ZIP code 28763. Otto has a community development organization which meets regularly in the Otto Community Building. This building is attached to the Otto Fire Station which is run by volunteer firefighters.

== Climate ==
According to the Köppen Climate Classification system, Otto has a humid subtropical climate, abbreviated "Cfa" on climate maps. The hottest temperature recorded in Otto was 99 °F (37.2 °C) on June 30–July 2, 2012, while the coldest temperature recorded was −18 °F (−27.8 °C) on January 21, 1985.

Climate data for Coweeta Experimental Station, North Carolina, 1991–2020 normals, extremes 1942–present
| Month | Jan | Feb | Mar | Apr | May | Jun | Jul | Aug | Sep | Oct | Nov | Dec | Year |
|---|---|---|---|---|---|---|---|---|---|---|---|---|---|
| Record high °F (°C) | 78 (26) | 79 (26) | 87 (31) | 89 (32) | 92 (33) | 99 (37) | 99 (37) | 97 (36) | 94 (34) | 90 (32) | 83 (28) | 77 (25) | 99 (37) |
| Mean maximum °F (°C) | 67.1 (19.5) | 70.9 (21.6) | 78.2 (25.7) | 83.7 (28.7) | 86.8 (30.4) | 90.1 (32.3) | 91.3 (32.9) | 90.7 (32.6) | 87.4 (30.8) | 81.6 (27.6) | 75.4 (24.1) | 68.2 (20.1) | 92.4 (33.6) |
| Mean daily maximum °F (°C) | 51.6 (10.9) | 55.3 (12.9) | 62.4 (16.9) | 71.0 (21.7) | 77.6 (25.3) | 83.2 (28.4) | 86.1 (30.1) | 85.1 (29.5) | 80.3 (26.8) | 71.8 (22.1) | 62.2 (16.8) | 54.2 (12.3) | 70.1 (21.1) |
| Daily mean °F (°C) | 38.6 (3.7) | 41.9 (5.5) | 48.5 (9.2) | 56.6 (13.7) | 64.0 (17.8) | 70.2 (21.2) | 73.4 (23.0) | 72.5 (22.5) | 67.2 (19.6) | 57.3 (14.1) | 47.5 (8.6) | 41.3 (5.2) | 56.6 (13.7) |
| Mean daily minimum °F (°C) | 25.7 (−3.5) | 28.5 (−1.9) | 34.5 (1.4) | 42.3 (5.7) | 50.3 (10.2) | 57.3 (14.1) | 60.7 (15.9) | 59.9 (15.5) | 54.1 (12.3) | 42.9 (6.1) | 32.8 (0.4) | 28.4 (−2.0) | 43.1 (6.2) |
| Mean minimum °F (°C) | 8.4 (−13.1) | 13.4 (−10.3) | 19.0 (−7.2) | 26.8 (−2.9) | 34.2 (1.2) | 45.5 (7.5) | 52.4 (11.3) | 50.7 (10.4) | 39.4 (4.1) | 27.3 (−2.6) | 19.5 (−6.9) | 15.1 (−9.4) | 4.8 (−15.1) |
| Record low °F (°C) | −18 (−28) | −4 (−20) | −1 (−18) | 16 (−9) | 23 (−5) | 32 (0) | 40 (4) | 40 (4) | 28 (−2) | 14 (−10) | 3 (−16) | −11 (−24) | −18 (−28) |
| Average precipitation inches (mm) | 7.08 (180) | 6.50 (165) | 6.67 (169) | 6.12 (155) | 5.30 (135) | 5.92 (150) | 5.11 (130) | 5.33 (135) | 5.68 (144) | 5.07 (129) | 6.14 (156) | 7.25 (184) | 72.17 (1,832) |
| Average snowfall inches (cm) | 0.4 (1.0) | 0.3 (0.76) | 1.1 (2.8) | 0.0 (0.0) | 0.0 (0.0) | 0.0 (0.0) | 0.0 (0.0) | 0.0 (0.0) | 0.0 (0.0) | 0.0 (0.0) | 0.0 (0.0) | 0.8 (2.0) | 2.6 (6.56) |
| Average precipitation days (≥ 0.01 in) | 11.6 | 11.3 | 12.5 | 11.0 | 12.0 | 13.6 | 13.8 | 12.5 | 9.0 | 8.6 | 9.6 | 12.2 | 137.7 |
| Average snowy days (≥ 0.1 in) | 0.2 | 0.2 | 0.1 | 0.0 | 0.0 | 0.0 | 0.0 | 0.0 | 0.0 | 0.0 | 0.0 | 0.4 | 0.9 |
Source 1: NOAA
Source 2: National Weather Service
