= Highlands, North Carolina =

City in North Carolina, United States

- Town
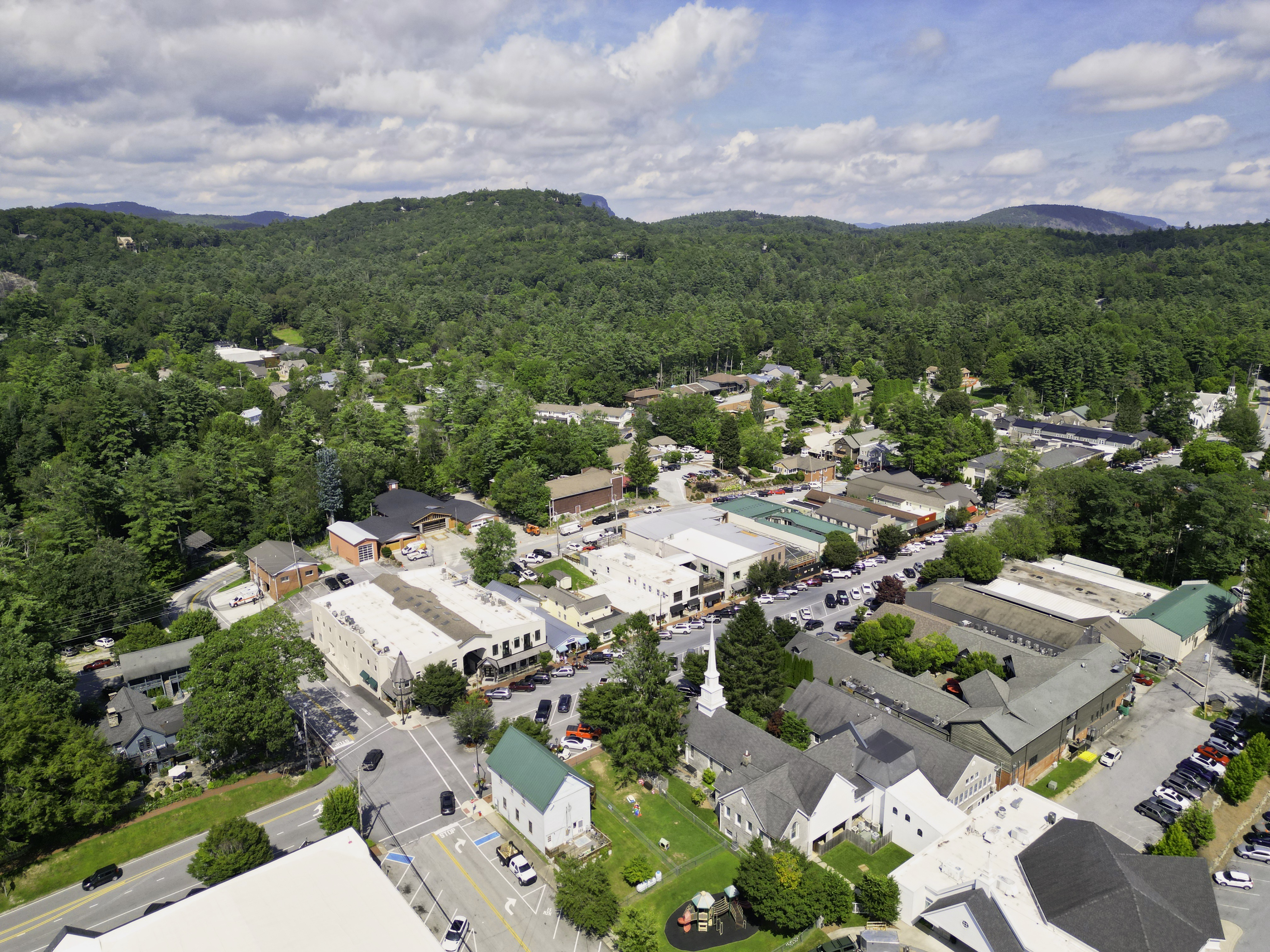
- Downtown Highlands in 2024

- Flag Seal
- Motto: Elevation 4,118
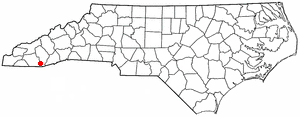
- Location of Highlands, North Carolina
- Coordinates: 35°03′13″N 83°11′51″W
- Country: United States
- State: North Carolina
- Counties: Macon, Jackson
- Townships: Highlands, Cashiers
- Founded: 1875

Government
  - Mayor: Patrick Taylor

Area
  - Total: 6.39 sq mi (16.55 km^{2})
  - Land: 6.25 sq mi (16.18 km^{2})
  - Water: 0.14 sq mi (0.37 km^{2})
- Elevation: 3,855 ft (1,175 m)

Population (2020)
  - Total: 1,072
  - Density: 171.6/sq mi (66.24/km^{2})
- Time zone: UTC-5 (Eastern (EST))
  - Summer (DST): UTC-4 (EDT)
- ZIP code: 28741
- Area code: 828
- FIPS code: 37-31360
- GNIS feature ID: 2405833
- Website: highlandsnc.org

Highlands is an incorporated town in Macon County in the U.S. state of North Carolina. Located on a plateau in the southern Appalachian Mountains, within the Nantahala National Forest, it lies mostly in southeastern Macon County and slightly in southwestern Jackson County, in the Highlands and Cashiers Townships, respectively. The permanent population was 1,014 at the 2020 census.

== History ==
Highlands was founded in 1875 after its two founders, Samuel Truman Kelsey and Clinton Carter Hutchinson, drew lines from Chicago to Savannah and from New Orleans to New York City. They felt that the place where these lines met would eventually become a great trading center and commercial crossroads. Highlands was named for its lofty elevation.

In the 1930s the town became a golfing mecca when Bobby Jones of Atlanta and some of his well-heeled golfing buddies founded the Highlands Country Club. Today that club is one of seven successful residential country club communities in the area. The Highlands Country Club is south of Highlands on Dillard Road (North Carolina Highway 106).

== Geography ==
According to the United States Census Bureau, the community has a total area of 6.2 square miles (16 km^{2}), of which 6.1 square miles (16 km^{2}) is land and 0.1 square miles (0.26 km^{2}), or 1.94%, is water.

The official average elevation within town limits is 4,118 ft (1,255 m), making it one of the highest incorporated municipalities east of the Mississippi River, and the highest not developed as a resort community - the only other communities laying higher, Sugar Mountain, NC, Wolf Laurel, NC, Snowshoe, WV, and Beech Mountain, NC were all created as resorts. The annual rainfall approaches 100 inches (2,500 mm) due to the orographic lifting effect of storms coming from the lower elevations. This rainfall, coupled with abundant sunshine, creates a lush and verdant microclimate that appeals to botanists.

== Climate ==
Highlands has a subtropical highland climate (Köppen Cfb), with cool winters and warm summers. Highlands experiences notably cooler weather than the rest of the American South; this cooling is caused by its altitude. Astride the Eastern Continental Divide, at just over 4,100 ft (1,200 m), the town's elevation contributes to its relatively cool summers and abundant rainfall, averaging 87.57 inches (2,224 mm) per year. Average snowfall is 13 inches (33 cm), largely due to the fact that Highlands is further south and east in the Appalachian Mountains. In 2013 Highlands received 106 inches of rainfall. Areas of similar elevation on the northwest side of the Appalachian region, such as Banner Elk, are not as protected from periodic blasts of Arctic air and receive more substantial snowfall. Highlands is one of the very rare locations at this latitude that has an average high of 78 °F or 26 °C in July, far lower than the rest of the American South.

Climate data for Highlands, North Carolina (1991–2020 normals, extremes 1893–present)
| Month | Jan | Feb | Mar | Apr | May | Jun | Jul | Aug | Sep | Oct | Nov | Dec | Year |
|---|---|---|---|---|---|---|---|---|---|---|---|---|---|
| Record high °F (°C) | 75 (24) | 78 (26) | 84 (29) | 90 (32) | 91 (33) | 97 (36) | 98 (37) | 98 (37) | 97 (36) | 87 (31) | 82 (28) | 75 (24) | 98 (37) |
| Mean daily maximum °F (°C) | 42.3 (5.7) | 46.4 (8.0) | 53.7 (12.1) | 62.1 (16.7) | 69.3 (20.7) | 74.8 (23.8) | 77.7 (25.4) | 76.1 (24.5) | 71.4 (21.9) | 62.5 (16.9) | 53.1 (11.7) | 45.1 (7.3) | 61.2 (16.2) |
| Daily mean °F (°C) | 33.1 (0.6) | 36.3 (2.4) | 42.7 (5.9) | 50.3 (10.2) | 58.0 (14.4) | 64.5 (18.1) | 67.7 (19.8) | 66.4 (19.1) | 61.3 (16.3) | 51.7 (10.9) | 42.4 (5.8) | 36.1 (2.3) | 50.9 (10.5) |
| Mean daily minimum °F (°C) | 23.9 (−4.5) | 26.3 (−3.2) | 31.7 (−0.2) | 38.6 (3.7) | 46.8 (8.2) | 54.2 (12.3) | 57.7 (14.3) | 56.7 (13.7) | 51.1 (10.6) | 40.8 (4.9) | 31.6 (−0.2) | 27.1 (−2.7) | 40.5 (4.7) |
| Record low °F (°C) | −19 (−28) | −19 (−28) | 7 (−14) | 13 (−11) | 24 (−4) | 32 (0) | 36 (2) | 42 (6) | 27 (−3) | 12 (−11) | −3 (−19) | −12 (−24) | −19 (−28) |
| Average precipitation inches (mm) | 7.99 (203) | 6.90 (175) | 7.60 (193) | 6.98 (177) | 6.60 (168) | 7.16 (182) | 7.09 (180) | 7.10 (180) | 7.98 (203) | 6.47 (164) | 7.76 (197) | 8.65 (220) | 88.28 (2,242) |
| Average snowfall inches (cm) | 2.6 (6.6) | 2.0 (5.1) | 1.8 (4.6) | 0.0 (0.0) | 0.2 (0.51) | 0.0 (0.0) | 0.0 (0.0) | 0.0 (0.0) | 0.0 (0.0) | 0.0 (0.0) | 0.1 (0.25) | 3.5 (8.9) | 10.2 (26) |
| Average precipitation days (≥ 0.01 in) | 13.9 | 13.7 | 13.9 | 12.2 | 13.9 | 15.4 | 16.9 | 15.8 | 11.8 | 10.4 | 11.1 | 14.1 | 163.1 |
| Average snowy days (≥ 0.1 in) | 1.1 | 1.1 | 0.9 | 0.0 | 0.1 | 0.0 | 0.0 | 0.0 | 0.0 | 0.0 | 0.2 | 1.6 | 5.0 |
Source: NOAA

== Economy ==
=== Tourism ===
Highlands is increasingly becoming a two-season community; a summer-season community and an ever-growing winter-season community. The summer season (generally March through November) draws large numbers of Southerners from the summertime heat and humidity found throughout much of the region to enjoy the cooler mountains and hometown "Main Street experience".

The town is dotted with antique dealers, restaurants (six of which have received awards from Wine Spectator), shops, and inns, as well as several buildings on the National Register of Historic Places. For the performing arts there are four theaters: The Highlands Playhouse (founded in 1938), the Instant Theatre Company (founded in 1981), the Highlands Community Players (founded in 1995), and the Martin-Lipscomb Performing Arts Center, which hosts touring groups. For the visual arts there is The Bascom - A Center for the Visual Arts, a new facility named for the artist and playwright, Louise Rand Bascom Barratt.

The historic (NRHP-listed) Lee's Inn, with an enormous tree growing through the middle of its dining room, was lost to an electrical fire in the 1980s and was not rebuilt. The historic Old Edwards Inn (also NRHP-listed) continues to operate as an inn and spa catering to affluent demographics, with several properties in Highlands and the surrounding area.

=== Martin-Lipscomb Performing Arts Center ===
Martin-Lipscomb Performing Arts Center
- The PAC
- Interactive map of Martin-Lipscomb Performing Arts Center
- Location: 507 Chestnut Street, Highlands, NC 28741
- Coordinates: 35°03′25″N 83°11′43″W
- Capacity: 3,500

Construction
- Opened: 2001
- Renovated: 2007

Tenant
- Highlands Community Players

The Martin-Lipscomb Performing Arts Center is a prominent venue in Highlands, featuring independent theater and local musical acts. When the building, which was formerly the Community Bible Church, went up for sale in 1999, the founding director of the Highlands-Cashiers Chamber Music Festival started a fundraising campaign to buy the property so that the festival could have a permanent home. Since then, the Performing Arts Center has brought over 255 performances to the southeastern Macon County area.

=== Public utilities and services ===
There is one public school in the town, Highlands School, as well as a public library, known as the Hudson Library. The Hudson Library is part of the Fontana Regional Library, which serves Swain, Jackson, and Macon counties. The Hudson Library also housed The Bascom until May 2009; The Bascom is a nonprofit visual arts center that is housed on a six-building, six-acre campus, and offers exhibitions and educational programs.

Highlands has one hospital, Highlands-Cashiers Hospital.

Highlands has a post office, with ZIP code 28741 covering all of Highlands township and adjacent parts of Sugar Fork township. It is within area code 828, and all telephone numbers served by the town's exchange begin with 526 or 482, with seven-digit dialing allowed. Since buying GTE, Verizon is now the telephone company for the area. It also offers DSL high-speed Internet.

==== Television and Internet ====
Cable television and Internet services for the town of Highlands are contracted to Northland Communications Corporation and Highlands Cable Group. Both systems carry local TV stations from the Asheville/Hendersonville Greenville/Spartanburg Designated Market Area. Additionally, because there are many visitors and residents from metro Atlanta, Northland carries two major-TV network stations from Atlanta: WSB-TV 2 (ABC), WAGA TV 5 (Fox). Highlands Cable Group now carries all the local networks and the 3 "PBS" networks as well as "Peachtree TV" and "Fox Networks".

Highlands is the city of license for two radio stations. WHLC FM 104.5 broadcasts from a house just north of the town and is one of very few stations to still have an easy listening format. Its omnidirectional broadcast range extends into all three surrounding states, going furthest into upstate South Carolina. W277CU on 103.3 relays Western North Carolina Public Radio from Asheville. UNCTV is relayed digitally on W35CK-D, replacing analog W27BD.

=== Transportation ===
There are four major roads in and out of town. Franklin Road and most of Main Street carry U.S. Route 64 west and N.C. 28 north, going briefly west and then northwest to Franklin, along the Mountain Waters Scenic Byway alongside the Cullasaja River. Cashiers Road and north Fourth Street carry U.S. 64 east, going north and then northeast toward Cashiers, with views of Whiteside Mountain. Walhalla Road and south Fourth Street carry N.C. 28 briefly south, west around the south side of downtown, and then south again toward Pine Mountain, Georgia, and Walhalla, South Carolina, keeping the number 28 in all three states. Dillard Road carries N.C. 106 southwest, crossing the state line five times, and soon ending at U.S. 441 in Dillard. There are also other state secondary roads maintained by NCDOT, with Buck Creek Road (N.C. 1535/1538) acting as a very curvy bypass route around the town.

There is no public transportation within or through the town. The nearest municipal airport is Macon County Airport, between Franklin and Iotla. While it is also the nearest automated airport weather station, conditions there do not accurately reflect Highlands, as there is a major difference in elevation, and therefore temperature and precipitation. A USFS RAWS automated weather station (HGLN7) operates from north-northwest of Highlands, along Flat Mountain Road (N.C. 1544).

== Recreation ==
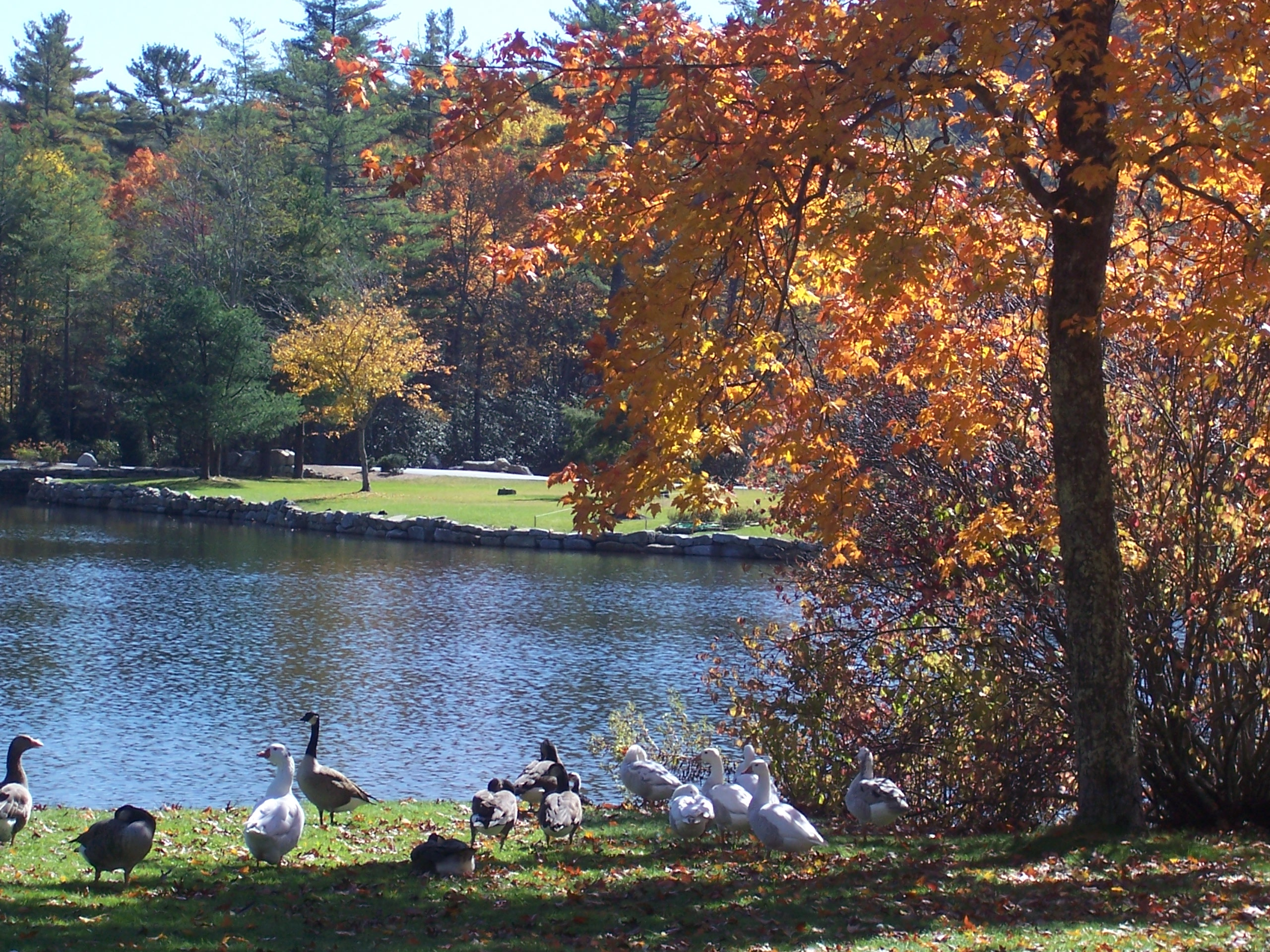
Harris Lake in Highlands during fall

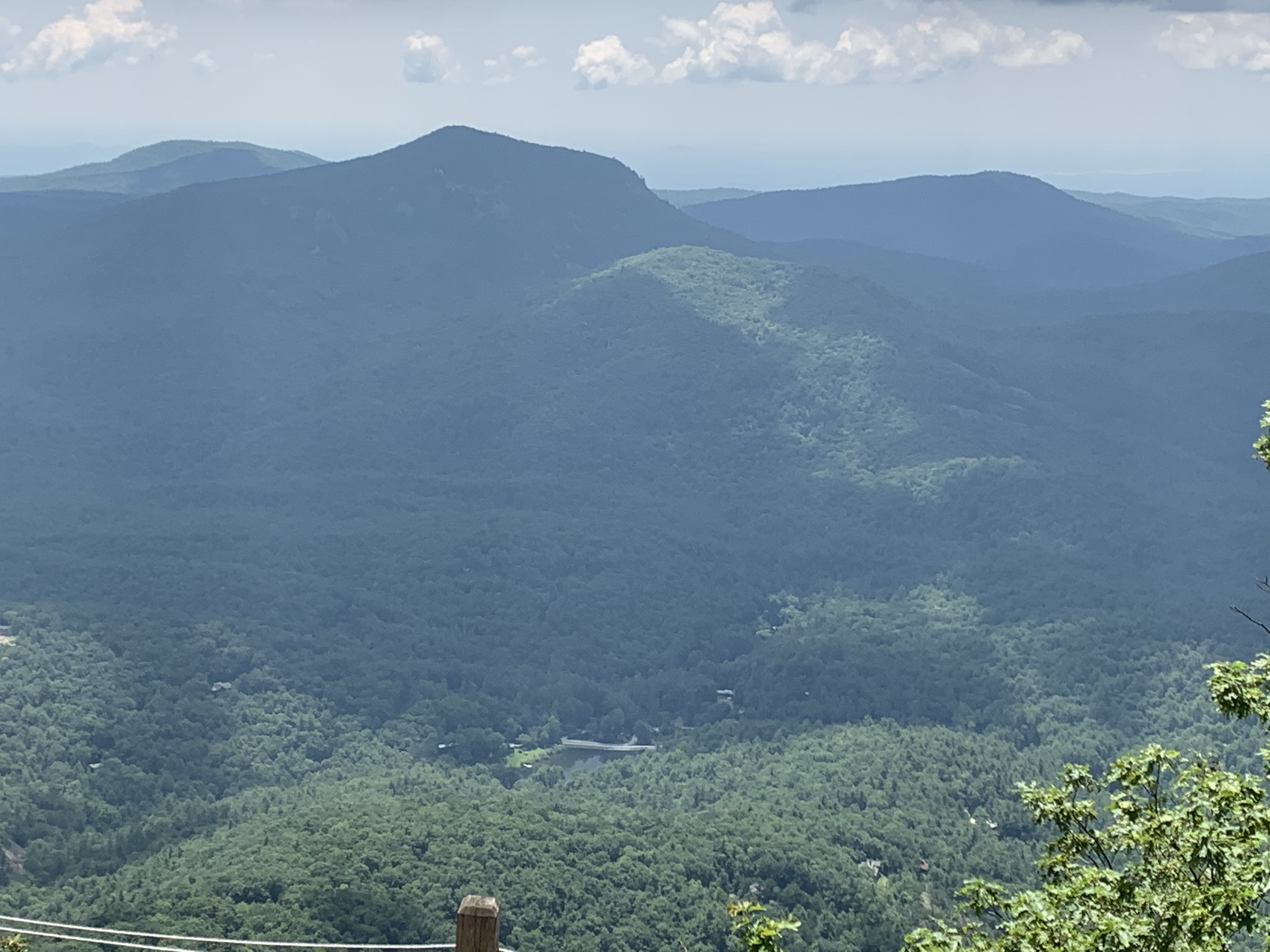
View of Terrapin Mountain and Whiteside Cove from Whiteside Mountain summit (Terrapin Mountain seen left of center, with Whiteside Cove extending beneath.

=== Hiking ===
The nature and hiking trails around Highlands are popular with backpackers, and there is at least one outfitter store in town. There are several mountainous hiking trails, including several leading to waterfalls.

=== Fishing ===
Fishing is available in Highlands, at Harris Lake, Cliffside Lake Recreation Area and other in-town and surrounding-area lakes. Cliffside Lake, in particular, is stocked with Rainbow, Brown and Brook Trout. Some fishing areas near Highlands are public and others are private fishing grounds. Fly Fishing is also a common activity in highlands/ There are also several rivers, including the Cullasaja River that begins in town, and the Chattooga River to the southeast.

== Waterfalls ==
=== Bridal Veil Falls ===
Bridal Veil Falls is a 45-foot (14 m) waterfall located in the Nantahala National Forest, northwest of Highlands. With a short curve of roadway located behind the falls, it has the distinction of being the only waterfall in the state that one can drive a vehicle behind. Bridal Veil Falls flows on a tributary of the Cullasaja River through the Nantahala National Forest. The falls flows over an overhanging bluff that allows visitors to walk behind the falls and remain dry when the waterflow is low. During periods of drought, the stream may nearly dry up, though visitors will get wet if the waterflow is moderate or high. Bridal Veil Falls is located on the side of U.S. Highway 64 2.3 miles (3.7 km) northwest of town. Highway 64 originally used the curve of roadway behind the falls exclusively so that all traffic went behind them; however, this caused problems with icing of the roadway during freezing weather, and it was re-routed around the front of the falls since. There is a parking area on the side of the road, where visitors can park and view the falls as well. In 2003, a massive boulder slid off the left side of the falls, blocking that side of the drive-under completely. However, in July 2007, that boulder was removed by a local developer.

=== Cullasaja Falls ===
Cullasaja Falls is located on the Cullasaja River in the Nantahala National Forest and is part of the Mountain Waters Scenic Byway. Cullasaja comes from a Cherokee word meaning "honey locust place". The falls is the last major waterfall on the Cullasaja River. The falls is a long cascade over the course of 0.2 miles (0.32 km). The height of the falls is given as 200 feet (61 m) in Kevin Adams' book, North Carolina Waterfalls and 250 feet (76 m) by NCWaterfalls.com. However, Google Earth gives a height (based on the elevation of the water at the top of the falls and the elevation of the plunge pool at the bottom of the falls) of 137 feet (42 m). The falls are located beside a series of blind curves on Highway 64 with sheer rock cliffs above and below the road. There is only one small pull-off near the falls, but walking on the road puts visitors in danger of being hit by a passing vehicle.

=== Dry Falls ===
Dry Falls, also known as Upper Cullasaja Falls, is a 65-foot (20 m) waterfall in the Nantahala National Forest, northwest of Highlands on the Cullasaja River. It is part of a series of waterfalls on an 8.7-mile (14.0 km) stretch of the river that eventually ends with Cullasaja Falls. Dry Falls flows over an overhanging bluff that allows visitors to walk up under the falls and remain relatively dry when the water flow is low, hence its name. The waterfall has also gone by other names, including High Falls, Pitcher Falls, and Cullasaja Falls. Dry Falls is located on the side of U.S. Highway 64, 3.1 miles (5.0 km) north of Highlands. There is a parking area on the side of the road, where visitors can park before walking the short path with stairs to the falls. During 2008-2009 the Forest Service made improvements to the parking area, which included renovation and expansion and the addition of bathroom facilities. A new walkway and overlook were also constructed adjacent to the parking area.

=== Quarry Falls ===
Quarry Falls (aka Bust Your Butt Falls) is a small waterfall located beside US Highway 64 west of Highlands. It is best known for the large, deep pool at the bottom and is a popular place for swimming during warm weather. Also located here is a rock to climb and jump from into the deep pool. The waterfall is located about 10 miles from Franklin and 6.5 miles from Highlands.

=== Other waterfalls ===
- Glen Falls
- Lower Cullasaja Falls
- Quarry Falls
- Silver Run Falls
- Secret Falls
- Scadin Falls
- Kalakaleskies Falls(Sequoyah Dam Falls)
- Whitewater Falls
  - Upper Whitewater Falls
  - Lower Whitewater Falls

== Demographics ==
Historical population
| Census | Pop. | Note | %± |
|---|---|---|---|
| 1880 | 82 | | — |
| 1900 | 233 | | — |
| 1910 | 249 | | 6.9% |
| 1920 | 267 | | 7.2% |
| 1930 | 443 | | 65.9% |
| 1940 | 569 | | 28.4% |
| 1950 | 515 | | −9.5% |
| 1960 | 597 | | 15.9% |
| 1970 | 583 | | −2.3% |
| 1980 | 653 | | 12.0% |
| 1990 | 948 | | 45.2% |
| 2000 | 909 | | −4.1% |
| 2010 | 924 | | 1.7% |
| 2020 | 1,072 | | 16.0% |
U.S. Decennial Census

=== 2020 census ===
Highlands racial composition
| Race | Number | Percentage |
|---|---|---|
| White (non-Hispanic) | 931 | 86.85% |
| Black or African American (non-Hispanic) | 7 | 0.65% |
| Native American | 1 | 0.09% |
| Asian | 14 | 1.31% |
| Other/Mixed | 42 | 3.92% |
| Hispanic or Latino | 77 | 7.18% |

As of the 2020 United States census, there were 1,072 people, 639 households, and 333 families residing in the town.

=== 2000 census ===
As of the census of 2000, there were 909 people, 445 households, and 253 families residing in the town. The population density was 150.0 inhabitants per square mile (57.9/km^{2}). There were 1,713 housing units at an average density of 282.7 units per square mile (109.2 units/km^{2}). The racial makeup of the town was 98.46% White, 0.11% Asian, 0.88% from other races, and 0.55% from two or more races. Hispanic or Latino of any race were 2.97% of the population.

There were 445 households, out of which 18.0% had children under the age of 18 living with them, 48.8% were married couples living together, 6.1% had a female householder with no husband present, and 43.1% were non-families. 36.9% of all households were made up of individuals, and 15.7% had someone living alone who was 65 years of age or older. The average household size was 2.04 and the average family size was 2.66.

In the town, the population was spread out, with 16.4% under the age of 18, 5.4% from 18 to 24, 19.9% from 25 to 44, 33.4% from 45 to 64, and 24.9% who were 65 years of age or older. The median age was 51 years. For every 100 females, there were 91.4 males. For every 100 females age 18 and over, there were 84.5 males.

The median income for a household in the town was $33,750, and the median income for a family was $46,875. Males had a median income of $31,964 versus $20,662 for females. The per capita income for the town was $24,120. About 4.2% of families and 7.5% of the population were below the poverty line, including 2.2% of those under age 18 and 13.5% of those age 65 or over.

== Media ==
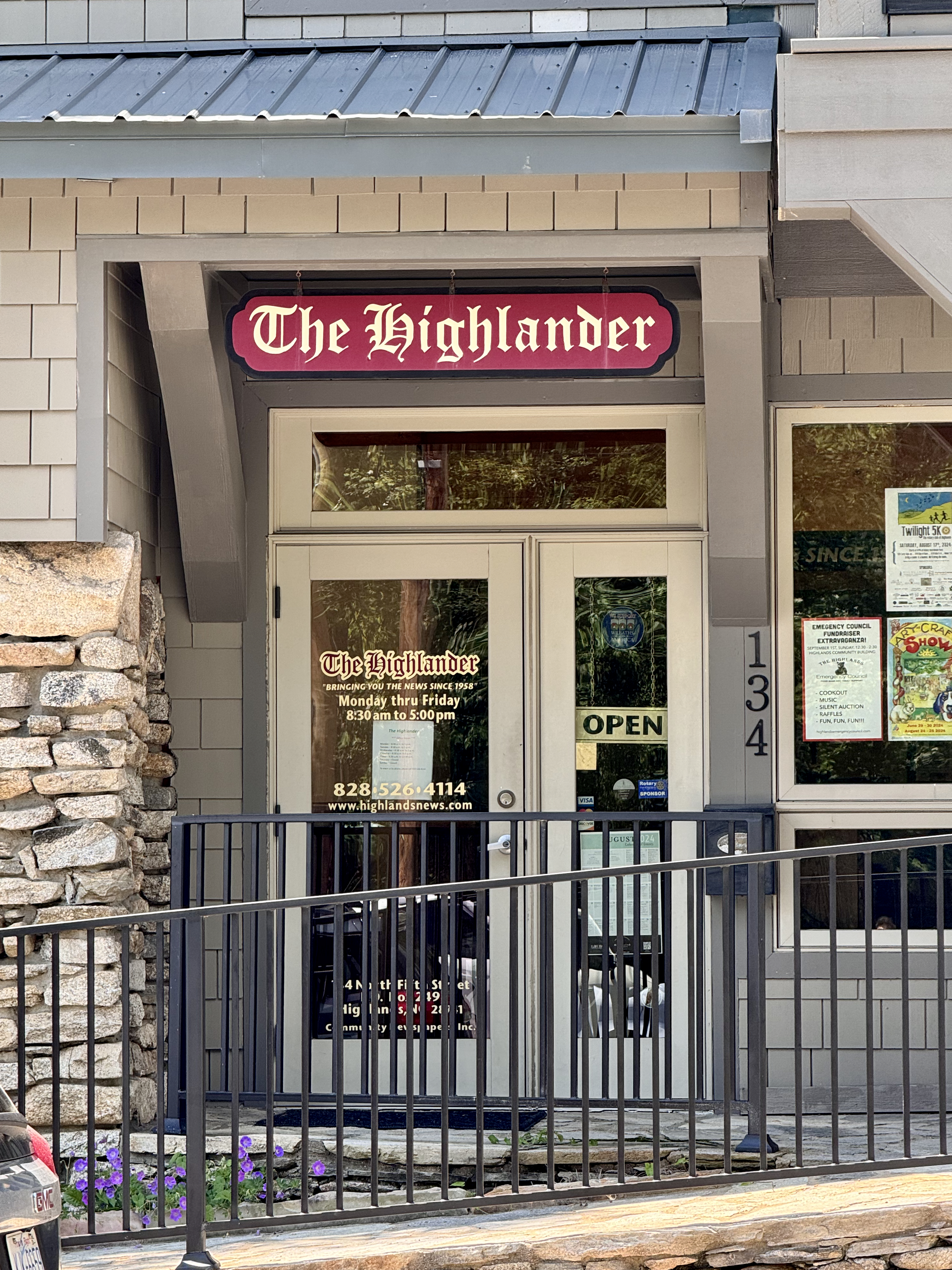
The Highlander newspaper headquarters at 134 N 5th St.

Highlands has been served by The Highlander newspaper since 1958. It was preceded by a newspaper of the same name that began in 1885 and ceased publication in 1887 due to financial difficulties.

== Notable people ==
- Bil Dwyer, cartoonist and humorist (1907–1987)

== Nearby towns ==
In North Carolina

- Scaly Mountain
- Franklin
- Cashiers

In Georgia

- Sky Valley
- Dillard
- Mountain City
- Pine Mountain
- Clayton
