= National Register of Historic Places listings in Jackson County, North Carolina =

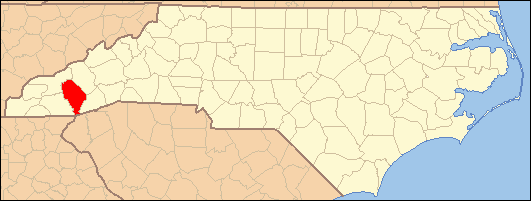

This list includes properties and districts listed on the National Register of Historic Places in Jackson County, North Carolina. Click the "Map of all coordinates" link to the right to view an online map of all properties and districts with latitude and longitude coordinates in the table below.

== Current listings ==
This National Park Service list is complete through NPS recent listings posted May 1, 2026.

	Name on the Register	Image	Date listed	Location	City or town	Description
1	E. M. Backus Lodge	E. M. Backus Lodge	June 9, 1988 (#88000689)	Cold Mountain Gap Rd. 35°09′38″N 82°59′51″W	Lake Toxaway	Extends into Transylvania County
2	Balsam Mountain Inn	Balsam Mountain Inn	July 15, 1982 (#82003475)	SR 1700 and SR 1701; 35°25′31″N 83°05′14″W	Balsam	
3	Blue Ridge Parkway	Blue Ridge Parkway	December 13, 2024 (#100011353)	Blue Ridge Parkway through Virginia and North Carolina; 35°27′10″N 83°06′11″W	Balsam vicinity	
4	Camp Merrie-Woode	Camp Merrie-Woode	June 2, 1995 (#95000674)	US 64 N side, 1.6 miles (2.6 km) N of jct. with NC 1120, at end of a one-mile-long (1.6 km) dirt rd. 35°07′59″N 83°02′38″W	Cashiers	
5	Church of the Good Shepherd	Church of the Good Shepherd	February 20, 1986 (#86000317)	NC 107 at SR 1118; 35°05′49″N 83°05′07″W	Cashiers	
6	Downtown Sylva Historic District	Downtown Sylva Historic District	September 3, 2014 (#14000545)	Roughly bounded by Southern RR., Main, Landis & Jackson Sts. 35°22′25″N 83°13′29″W	Sylva	
7	Fairfield Inn	Fairfield Inn	June 14, 1982 (#82003476)	U.S. 64; 35°07′26″N 83°02′39″W	Cashiers	Demolished
8	Lucius Coleman Hall House	Lucius Coleman Hall House	March 9, 1990 (#90000365)	Off NC 116, 0.1 miles (0.16 km) E of jct. with SR 1367; 35°20′40″N 83°13′43″W	Webster	
9	Elisha Calor Hedden House	Elisha Calor Hedden House	December 21, 1989 (#89002133)	Main St. and Old Webster-Sylva Rd. 35°20′47″N 83°13′08″W	Webster	
10	High Hampton Inn Historic District	High Hampton Inn Historic District	September 26, 1991 (#91001468)	NC 107 E side, 1.5 miles (2.4 km) S of US 64; 35°05′56″N 83°04′57″W	Cashiers	
11	Dr. D. D. Hooper House	Dr. D. D. Hooper House	April 21, 2000 (#00000395)	773 W. Main St. 35°22′25″N 83°13′37″W	Sylva	
12	Jackson County Courthouse	Jackson County Courthouse	May 10, 1979 (#79001727)	Main St. 35°22′26″N 83°13′41″W	Sylva	
13	Joyner Building	Joyner Building	December 8, 1978 (#78001961)	Western Carolina University Campus; 35°18′40″N 83°10′40″W	Cullowhee	Burned
14	Judaculla Rock	Judaculla Rock	March 27, 2013 (#13000116)	552 Judaculla Rock Rd. 35°18′02″N 83°06′34″W	Cullowhee	
15	Elias Brendle Monteith House and Outbuildings	Elias Brendle Monteith House and Outbuildings	August 13, 2008 (#08000778)	111 Hometown Place Rd. 35°22′22″N 83°14′41″W	Dillsboro	
16	Walter E. Moore House	Walter E. Moore House	February 23, 1990 (#90000322)	Main St. 35°20′44″N 83°13′11″W	Webster	
17	Mount Beulah Hotel	Mount Beulah Hotel	March 1, 1984 (#84002337)	US 23 and 441; 35°22′11″N 83°15′07″W	Dillsboro	
18	St. David's-in-the-Valley Episcopal Church	St. David's-in-the-Valley Episcopal Church	August 15, 2025 (#100012158)	286 Forest Hills Road; 35°18′18″N 83°10′53″W	Cullowhee	
19	Webster Baptist Church	Webster Baptist Church	December 21, 1989 (#89002137)	NC 116 and SR 1340; 35°20′23″N 83°13′36″W	Webster	
20	Webster Methodist Church	Webster Methodist Church	December 21, 1989 (#89002130)	NC 116/Main St. 35°20′38″N 83°13′22″W	Webster	
21	Webster Rock School	Webster Rock School	January 4, 1990 (#89002262)	Main St. 35°20′37″N 83°13′23″W	Webster	
22	Mordecai Zachary House	Mordecai Zachary House	December 31, 1998 (#98001575)	NC 107, 0.2 miles (0.32 km) S of NC 1107; 35°05′28″N 83°04′51″W	Cashiers	

== See also ==
- National Register of Historic Places listings in North Carolina
- List of National Historic Landmarks in North Carolina
