= Webster Methodist Church =

Historic church in North Carolina, United States

- U.S. National Register of Historic Places
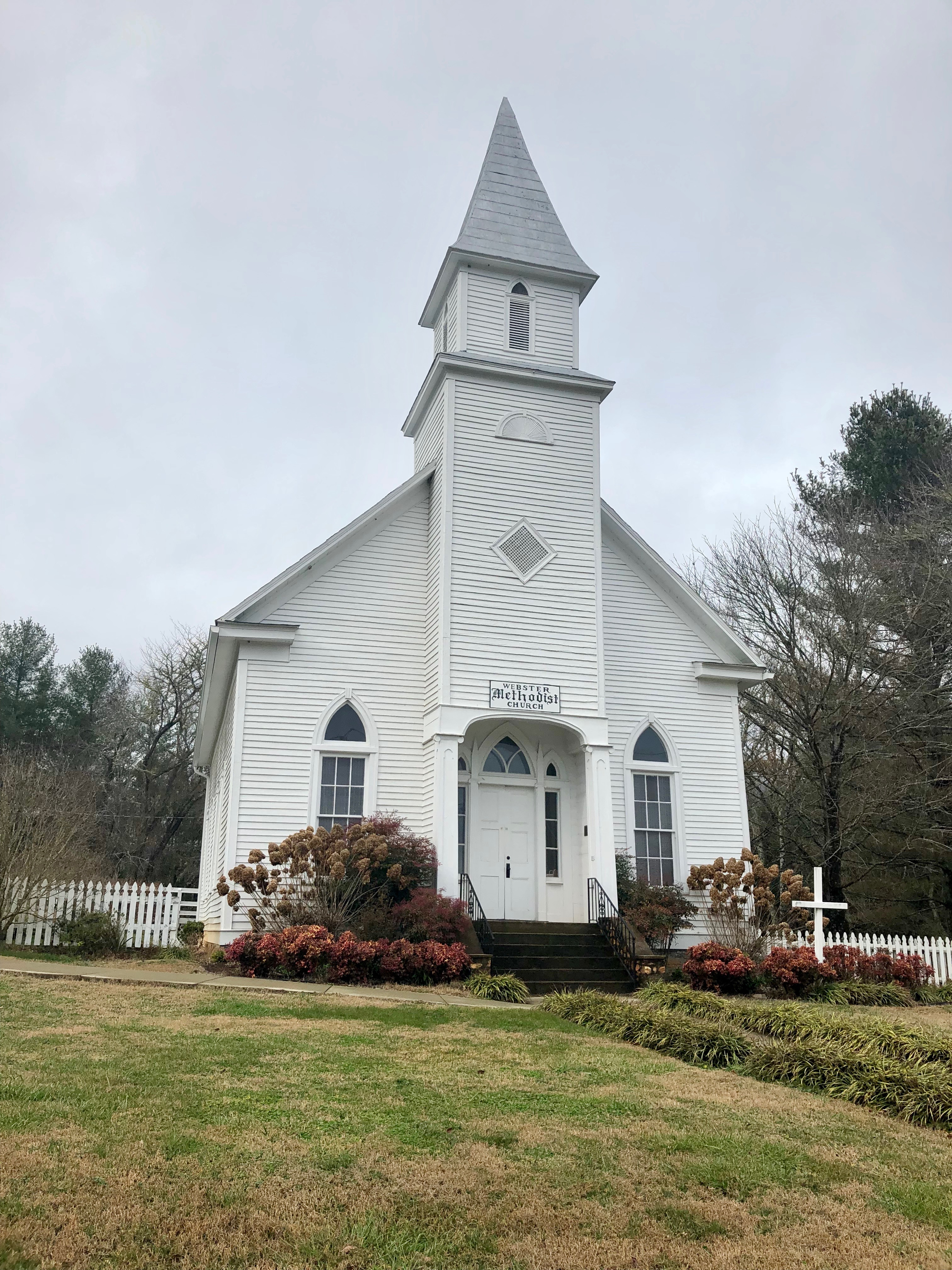
- Webster Methodist Church, January 2019

- Location within North Carolina Location within the United States
- Location: NC 116/Webster Rd., Webster, North Carolina
- Coordinates: 35°20′38″N 83°13′22″W
- Area: 0.5 acres (0.20 ha)
- Built: 1887
- Architectural style: Gothic Revival, Vernacular Gothic Revival
- NRHP reference No.: 89002130
- Added to NRHP: December 21, 1989

Webster Methodist Church is an historic Methodist church located on NC 116 / Main St., at Webster, Jackson County, North Carolina. It was built in 1887, and is a one-story, three-bay, rectangular Vernacular Gothic Revival style frame church. It is sheathed in weatherboard, has a front gable roof, and engaged bell tower.

In 1989 it was added to the National Register of Historic Places. Congressman David McKee Hall is buried in the church cemetery.

== Use ==
The building was built as the Methodist Church building of the town of Webster, North Carolina in 1887, and still serves as a church. It was renovated in 1960 and 2000. It sits on the old Main Street of Webster next to the Webster Rock School, on the hill on which the downtown area of Webster was once located. It was built when Webster was a thriving town with a Courthouse, many businesses, homes, and people. Today Webster is a quiet residential area with two churches, a cemetery, older Victorian homes, 1920s-1950s homes, newer homes, and an old rock WPA Schoolhouse. The current congregation meets on Sundays at 9:30 a.m.

== See also ==
- National Register of Historic Places listings in Jackson County, North Carolina
