= Webster Baptist Church (Webster, North Carolina) =

Historic church in North Carolina, United States

- U.S. National Register of Historic Places
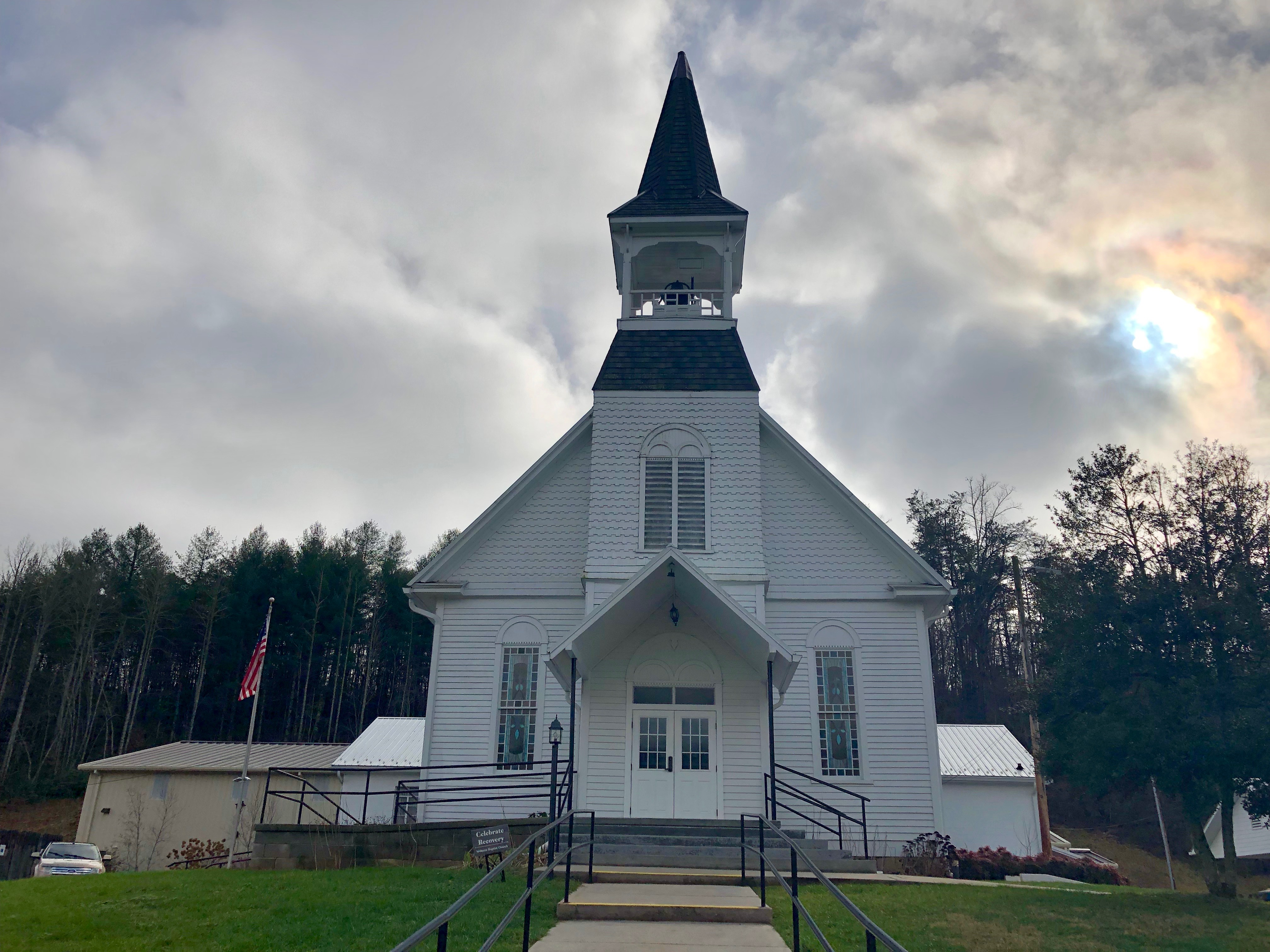
- Webster Baptist Church, January 2019

- Location within North Carolina Location within the United States
- Location: NC 116 and SR 1340, near Webster, North Carolina
- Coordinates: 35°20′23″N 83°13′35″W
- Area: 1 acre (0.40 ha)
- Built: 1900
- Built by: Cowan, Joseph Warrenton; Cowan, Lawrence D.
- Architectural style: Late Victorian, Vernacular Victorian
- NRHP reference No.: 89002137
- Added to NRHP: December 21, 1989

Webster Baptist Church is an historic Southern Baptist church located at the intersection of NC 116 and SR 1340, near Webster, Jackson County, North Carolina. It was built in 1900, and is a one-story, three-bay, rectangular Vernacular Victorian style church. It has a steep gable roof, engaged three stage bell tower, and tall round-headed windows. The church retains its original furniture built and donated by local master cabinetmaker Joseph Warrenton Cowan (1834-1917) and his son, Lawrence Cowan.

In 1989 it was added to the National Register of Historic Places.

== Current use ==
The building is the landmark building of the town of Webster, North Carolina, and still serves as a church. It was added to and renovated in 1953 and 1998. It sits across the Tuckasegee River from the hill on which the downtown area of Webster was once located, and was originally built in 1900. The building is not actually within the city limits of Webster. It was built when Webster was a thriving town with a Courthouse, many businesses, homes, and people. Today Webster is a quiet residential area with two churches, a cemetery, older Victorian homes, 1920s-1950s homes, newer homes, and an old rock WPA Schoolhouse.

== See also ==
- National Register of Historic Places listings in Jackson County, North Carolina
