= David McKee Hall =

American politician

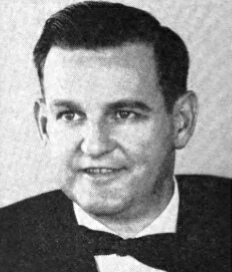

Member of the U.S. House of Representatives from North Carolina's 12th district
- In office January 3, 1959 – January 29, 1960
- Preceded by: George A. Shuford
- Succeeded by: Roy A. Taylor

Member of the North Carolina Senate from the 32nd district
- In office November 2, 1954 – November 6, 1956 Serving with William Medford

Personal details
- Born: May 16, 1918 Sylva, North Carolina, U.S.
- Died: January 26, 1960 (aged 41) Sylva, North Carolina, U.S.
- Party: Democratic
- Spouse: Sarah McCollum (m. 1944)
- Children: 3
- Relatives: Gertrude Dills McKee (great-aunt); Dan K. Moore (uncle)
- Education: University of North Carolina (LLB)

David McKee Hall (May 16, 1918 – January 29, 1960) was a representative from North Carolina. He was born in Sylva, North Carolina. He attended the public schools in Jackson County, North Carolina, and then became a special student at the University of North Carolina, receiving a certificate of law in 1947 and a law degree in 1948. Hall was admitted to the bar in 1948 and commenced practice in Sylva. He served as attorney for the towns of Sylva, Dillsboro, Webster, and Jackson County; Then, in 1952 he was appointed to the Twentieth Judicial District Committee. He organized the Jackson County Savings & Loan Association and served as secretary; in 1953 organized Jackson County Industries, Inc., and served as president; member of the North Carolina Senate in the 1955 session; member of North Carolina Board of Water Commissioners 1955–1958; elected as a Democrat to the 86th United States Congress and served from January 3, 1959, until his death in Sylva, North Carolina on January 29, 1960; and was interred in Webster Methodist Church Cemetery in Webster, North Carolina.

Hall's great-aunt was Gertrude Dills McKee, first woman to serve in the North Carolina State Senate, and his uncle was Governor Dan K. Moore.

== See also ==
- List of members of the United States Congress who died in office (1950–1999)

U.S. House of Representatives
Preceded by George A. Shuford	Member of the U.S. House of Representatives from North Carolina's 12th congressional district 1959–1960	Succeeded by Roy A. Taylor
