= Jackson County Airport (North Carolina) =

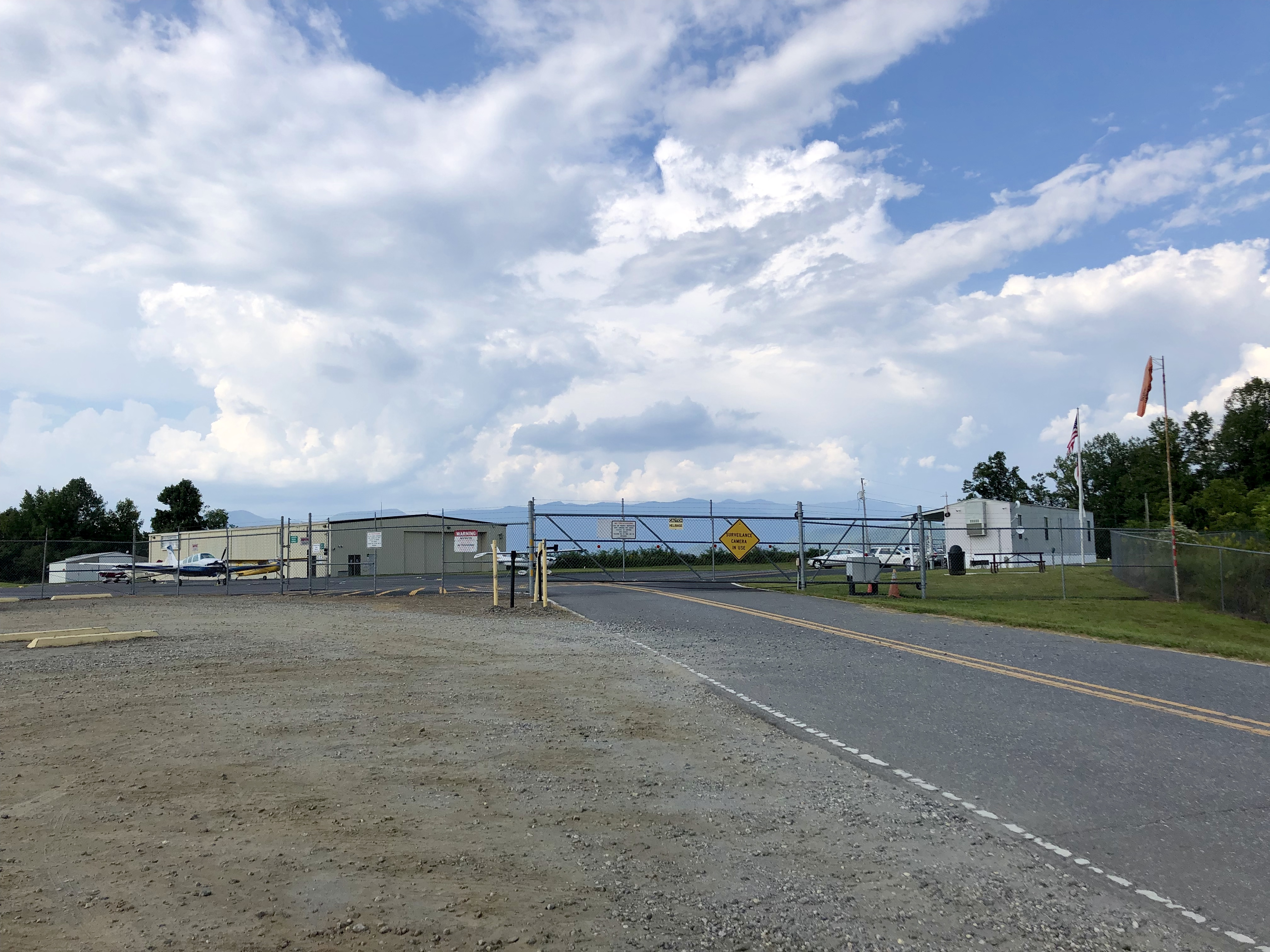
- Jackson County Airport from Airport Road
- IATA: none; ICAO: none; FAA LID: 24A

Summary
- Airport type: Public
- Owner: Jackson County Airport Authority
- Serves: Cullowhee, North Carolina
- Elevation AMSL: 2,857 ft (871 m)
- Coordinates: 35°19′03″N 83°12′36″W

Map
- Location of airport in North Carolina 24A (the United States)

Runways
Direction	Length		Surface
Direction	ft	m	Surface
15/33	3,210	978	Asphalt

Jackson County Airport (FAA LID: 24A) is a small airfield situated on a ridge about three miles (4.8 km) southeast of the town of Sylva, the county seat of Jackson County, North Carolina, United States. It is less than 1 mile west of the unincorporated town of Cullowhee, the home of Western Carolina University. The airport is owned and operated by the county. It sits at an elevation of 2,857 feet (871 meters) and covers an area of 147 acres (59 ha). The airport's traffic consists mostly of light single and twin engine private aircraft.

== History ==
The Jackson County Airport was once a dirt airstrip in the Addie community east of Sylva in the 1930s. The site has been since developed, but it was used as an airport until the 1960s. In the 1960s, a grassy airstrip was opened where the baseball stadium and nursery now stand on the Western Carolina University campus. This airport was in a bad location, as at one end was Forest Hills Road and at the other end were high-voltage power lines. It was also very close to the Cordelia Camp Laboratory School, Cullowhee Creek, Speedwell Road, and later EJ Whitmore Stadium. In the 1970s, a new airport was badly needed by the county. Two sites were suggested: Berry Ridge above Cullowhee and the flat bottom lands at Barkers Creek/Wilmot. In the mid-1970s, the Berry Ridge site was selected, and the airport was constructed by cutting the top off the ridge and filling in the low areas to make room for a hangar, runway, terminal building, road, parking lot, and beacon. The airport was built to be very modern, and the terminal was a great example of 1970s architecture.

The airport opened in 1978. Soon after, heavy rains and construction deficiencies caused the south end of the runway to begin eroding off. A section of the runway was abandoned and no longer poses a threat, it was stabilized and is at the south end of the airport. In 1990, when under renovation, the Airport's Terminal building was destroyed by a severe storm, and was finally razed in 1999. Today, there is a temporary terminal with a restroom, planning area with wifi, and lounge area. A courtesy crew car is available by arrangement. Self-service 100LL fuel is available 24–7. There is a GPS approach for Runway 33 and weather is available 24-7 through an AWOS III P/T on 118.9 and on the Internet.

== Airport operations ==
- Open to the public
- Sectional chart: Atlanta
- Control tower: No
- Air Route Traffic Control Center: Atlanta Center
- Runway and Airfield Lights: On from dusk to dawn
- Beacon: White-green (lighted land airport)

== Runways ==
- Number of Runways: 1 (Runway 15/33)
- Dimensions: 3,210 by 60 feet (978 by 18 meters)
- Surface: Asphalt, in good condition
- Weight bearing capacity: Single wheel, 12500 lbs
- Runway edge lights: Medium intensity
- Runway edge markings: Runway numbers are smaller than standard

== Airport communications ==
Jackson County Airport has no control tower. Pilots communicate among themselves to coordinate landings and take-offs via the UNICOM frequency of 123.0 MHz Weather is available through an AWOS III P/T on 118.9 and the internet. Airport phone number is (828) 586–0321.

== See also ==
- List of airports in North Carolina
