= Webster, North Carolina =

- Town
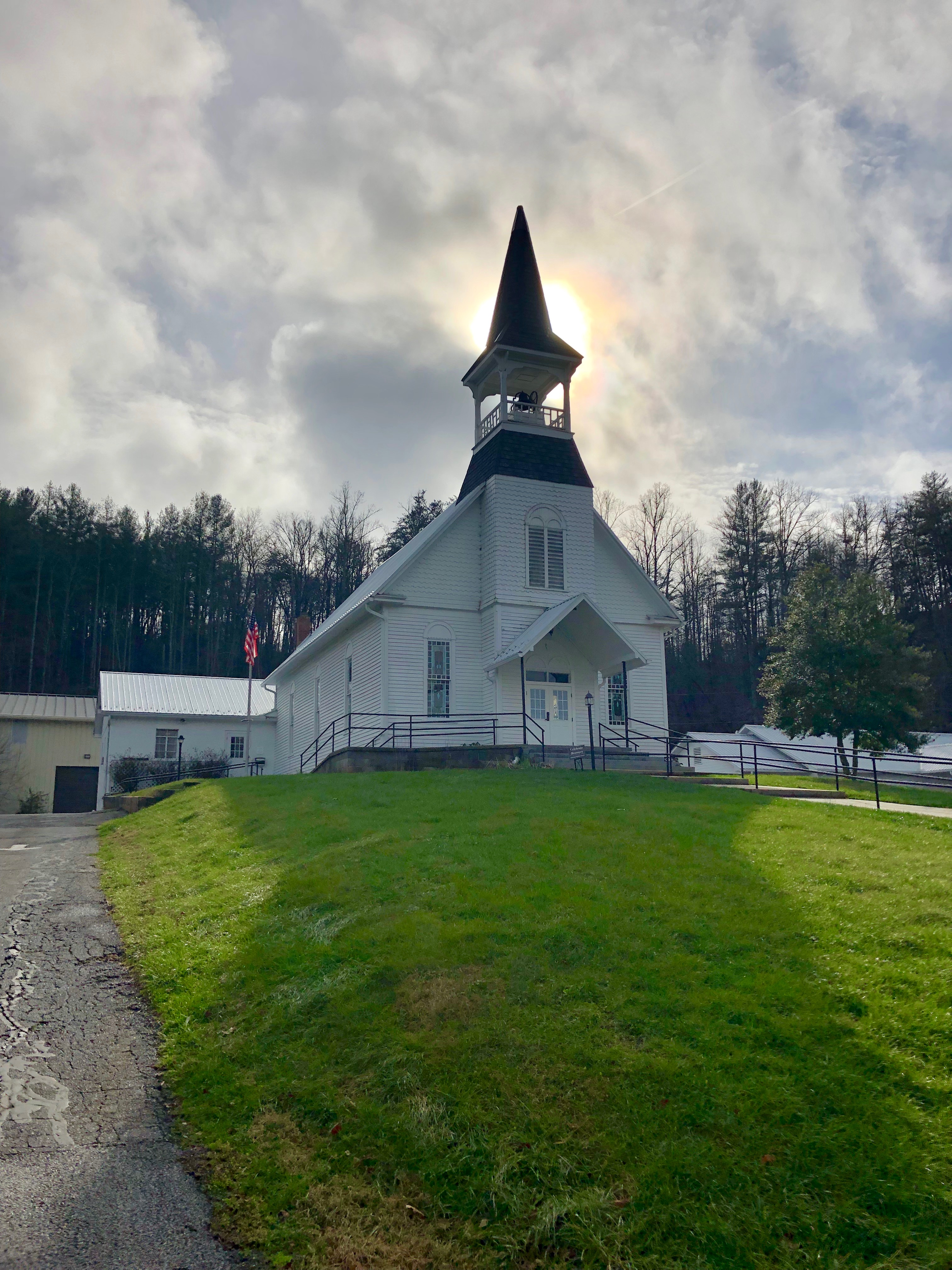
- Webster Baptist Church

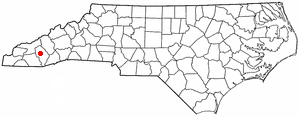
- Location of Webster, North Carolina
- Coordinates: 35°21′00″N 83°13′08″W
- Country: United States
- State: North Carolina
- County: Jackson
- Established: 1851
- Named for: Daniel Webster

Area
  - Total: 1.00 sq mi (2.58 km^{2})
  - Land: 1.00 sq mi (2.58 km^{2})
  - Water: 0 sq mi (0.00 km^{2})
- Elevation: 2,133 ft (650 m)

Population (2020)
  - Total: 372
  - Density: 372.8/sq mi (143.94/km^{2})
- Time zone: UTC-5 (Eastern (EST))
  - Summer (DST): UTC-4 (EDT)
- ZIP code: 28788
- Area code: 828
- FIPS code: 37-71600
- GNIS feature ID: 2406849
- Website: townofwebster.org

Webster is a town in Jackson County, North Carolina, United States. As of the 2020 census, Webster had a population of 372.

Webster was the first county seat of Jackson County, until Sylva assumed the role in 1913.

== Geography ==
Webster is located in north-central Jackson County north of the Tuckasegee River. North Carolina Highway 116 runs through the town, leading east 1 mile (1.6 km) to North Carolina Highway 107 and west across the Tuckasegee 2.5 miles (4.0 km) to U.S. Route 23. NC 107 runs along the eastern edge of Webster, leading north 2 miles (3 km) to Sylva and south 3 miles (5 km) to Cullowhee.

According to the United States Census Bureau, Webster has a total area of 1.0 square mile (2.6 km^{2}), all land.

== Demographics ==
Historical population
Census	Pop.	Note	%±
1880	107		—
1890	209		95.3%
1910	227		—
1920	74		−67.4%
1930	134		81.1%
1940	84		−37.3%
1950	142		69.0%
1960	166		16.9%
1970	181		9.0%
1980	200		10.5%
1990	410		105.0%
2000	486		18.5%
2010	363		−25.3%
2020	372		2.5%
U.S. Decennial Census

As of the census of 2000, there were 486 people, 200 households, and 141 families residing in the town. The population density was 303.3 inhabitants per square mile (117.1/km^{2}). There were 227 housing units at an average density of 141.7 per square mile (54.7/km^{2}). The racial makeup of the town was 94.03% White, 2.06% African American, 1.03% Asian, 0.41% from other races, and 2.47% from two or more races. Hispanic or Latino of any race were 1.03% of the population.

There were 200 households, out of which 32.5% had children under the age of 18 living with them, 54.0% were married couples living together, 14.5% had a female householder with no husband present, and 29.5% were non-families. 27.5% of all households were made up of individuals, and 11.5% had someone living alone who was 65 years of age or older. The average household size was 2.28 and the average family size was 2.72.

In the town, the population was spread out, with 24.5% under the age of 18, 6.0% from 18 to 24, 20.2% from 25 to 44, 31.1% from 45 to 64, and 18.3% who were 65 years of age or older. The median age was 45 years. For every 100 females, there were 72.3 males. For every 100 females age 18 and over, there were 71.5 males.

The median income for a household in the town was $40,313, and the median income for a family was $46,042. Males had a median income of $40,000 versus $30,278 for females. The per capita income for the town was $21,019. About 14.5% of families and 12.8% of the population were below the poverty line, including 15.2% of those under age 18 and 1.3% of those age 65 or over.

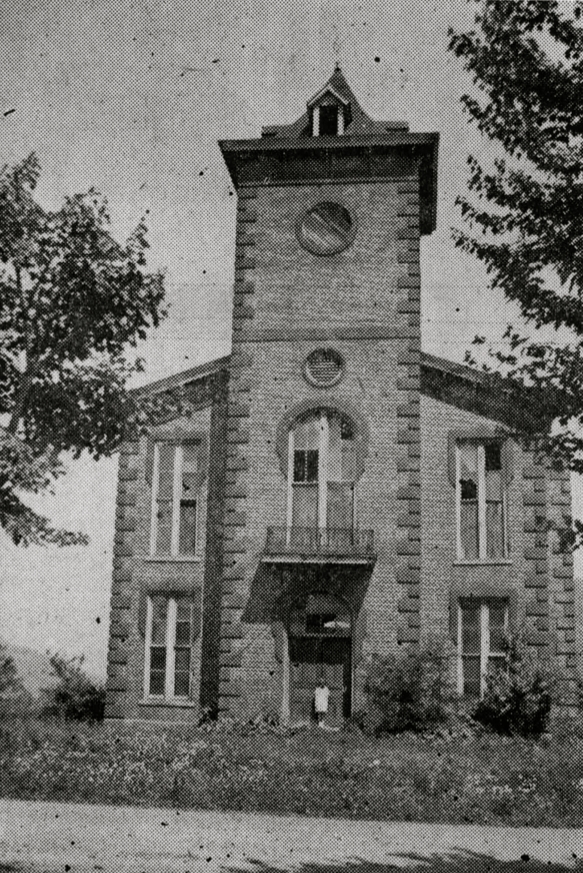
The old Webster Courthouse, built in 1888, abandoned in 1914, and demolished in 1935

== History ==
Webster was founded in 1851 in order to serve as the county seat of Jackson County. A massive fire and the railroad's failure to come to the town caused the larger and more powerful railroading center of Sylva to take over the position of county seat. Webster once had a courthouse and many shops, but few of the buildings that hint at its vibrant past as a thriving county seat survive.

Several buildings on the National Register of Historic Places are within the town. The Lucius Coleman Hall House, the Elisha Calor Hedden House, the Walter E. Moore House, and the old Webster Rock Schoolhouse, built by the Works Progress Administration in 1936, were all listed in 1990. The Webster Baptist Church, built in 1900, and the Webster Methodist Church, next to the old school and built around the same time, were listed in 1989; the former is across the Tuckasegee River outside the town limits but still considered to be in Webster.

== Photo gallery ==
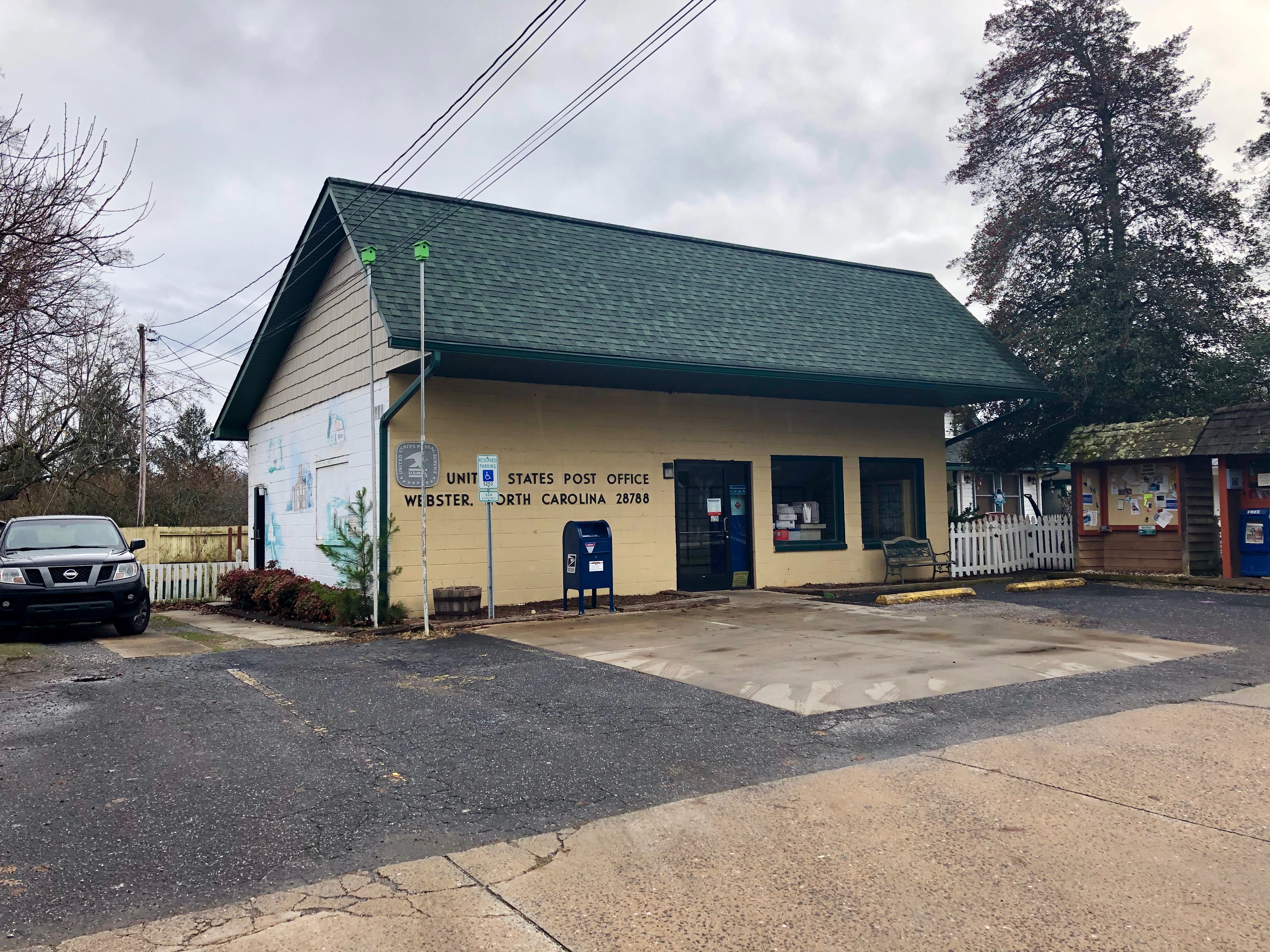
U.S. Post Office, Webster, NC

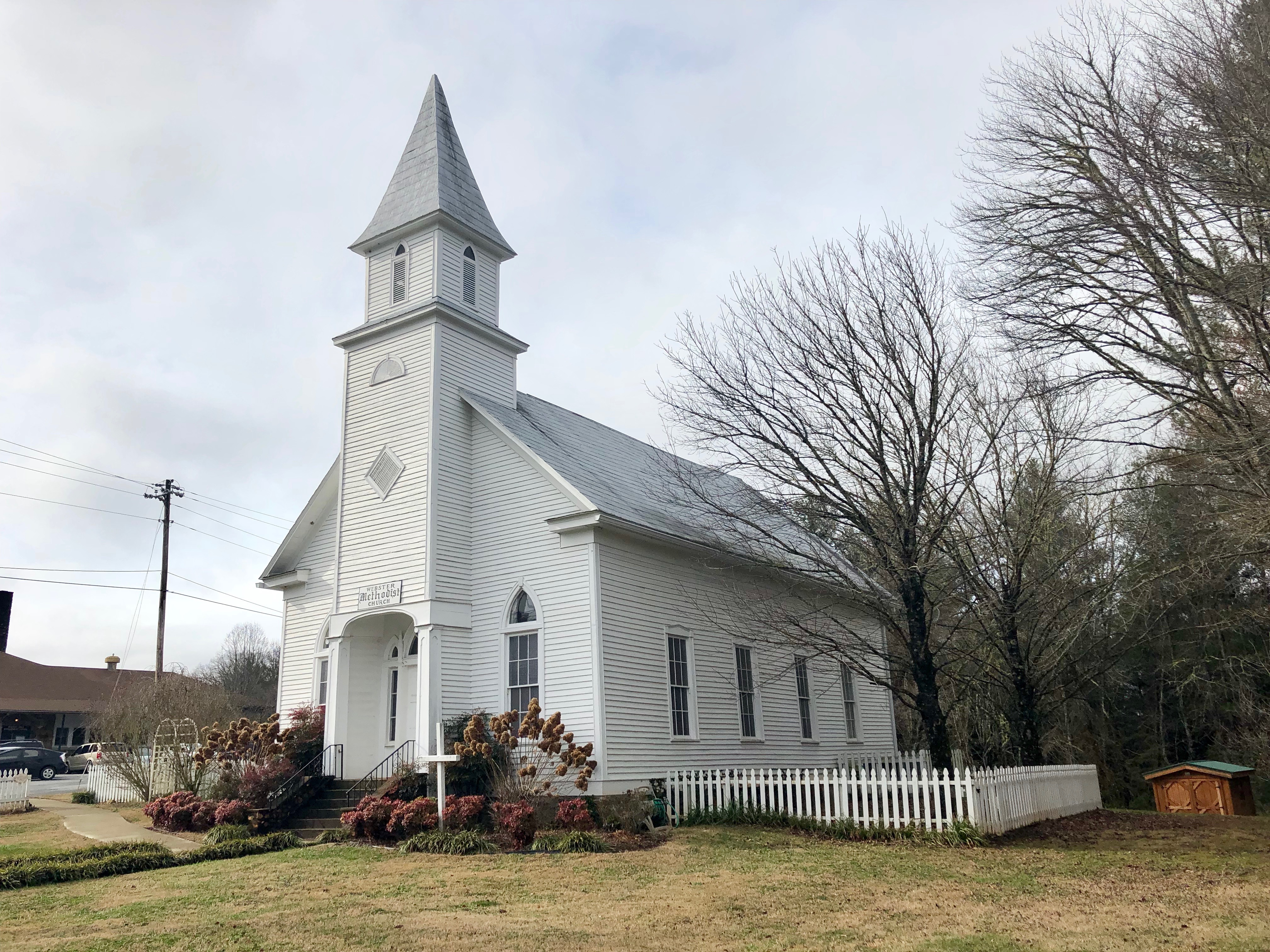
Webster Methodist Church (1887)

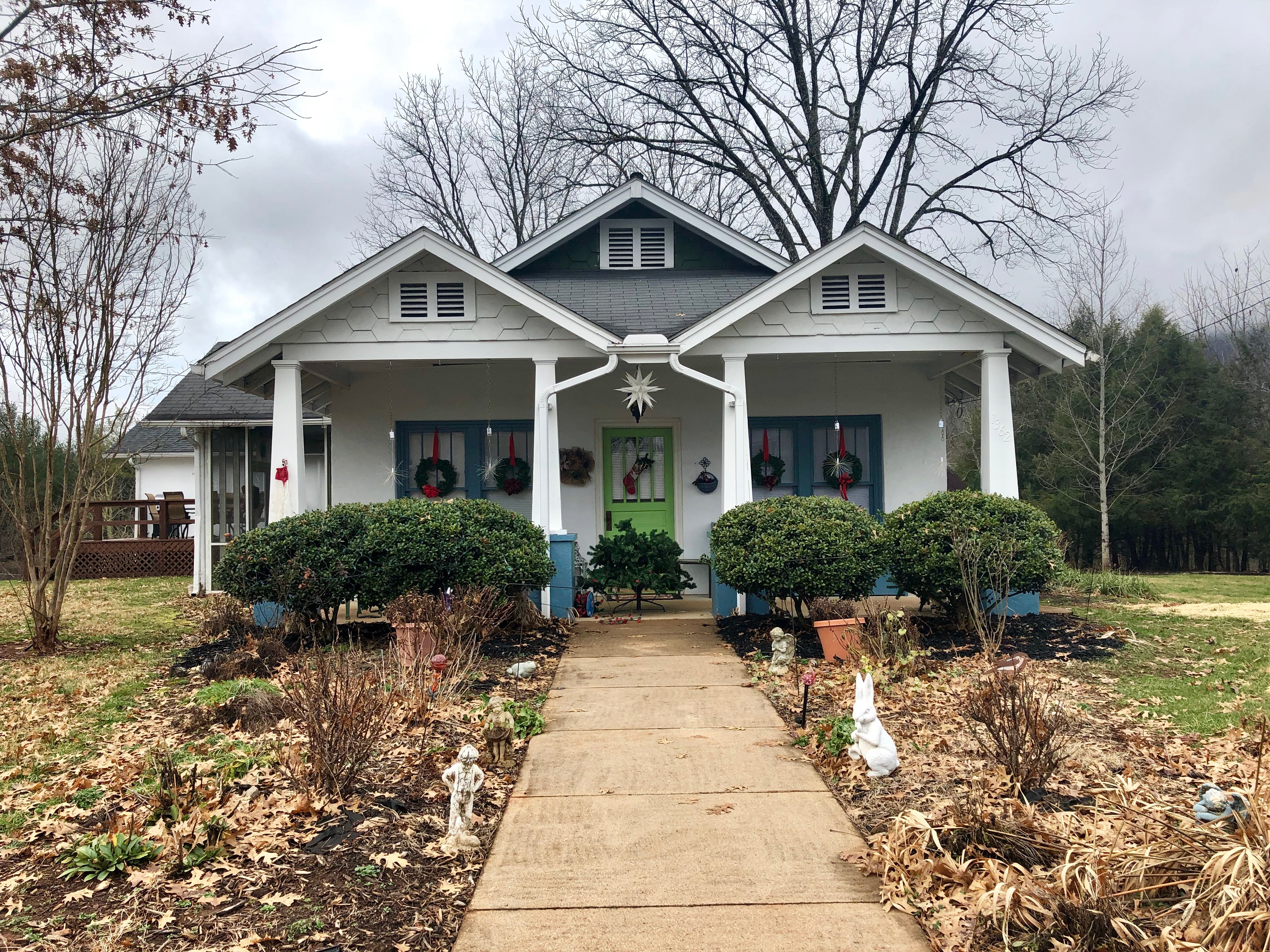
Rhinehart House (1935)

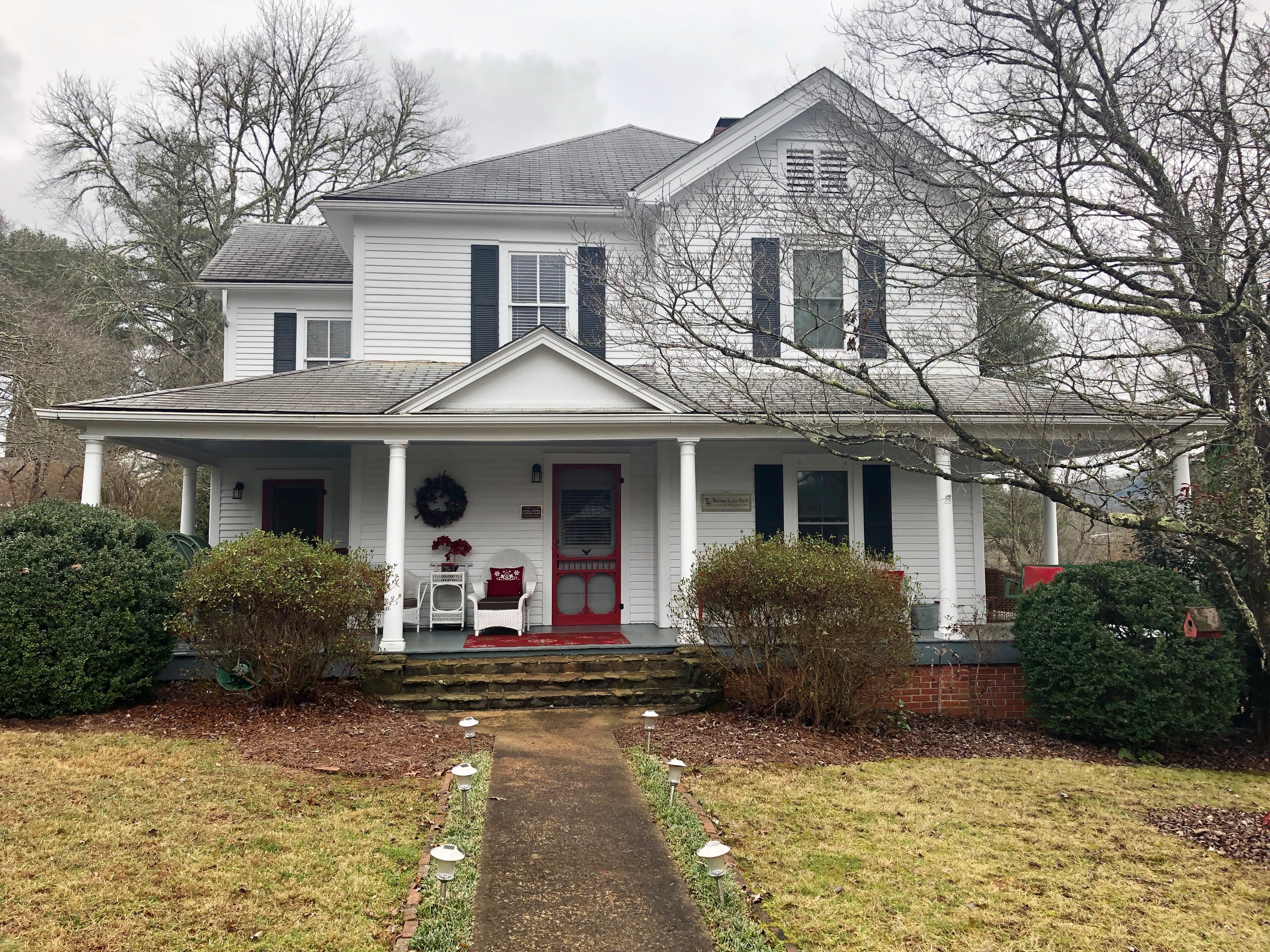
Elisha Calor Hedden House (1910)

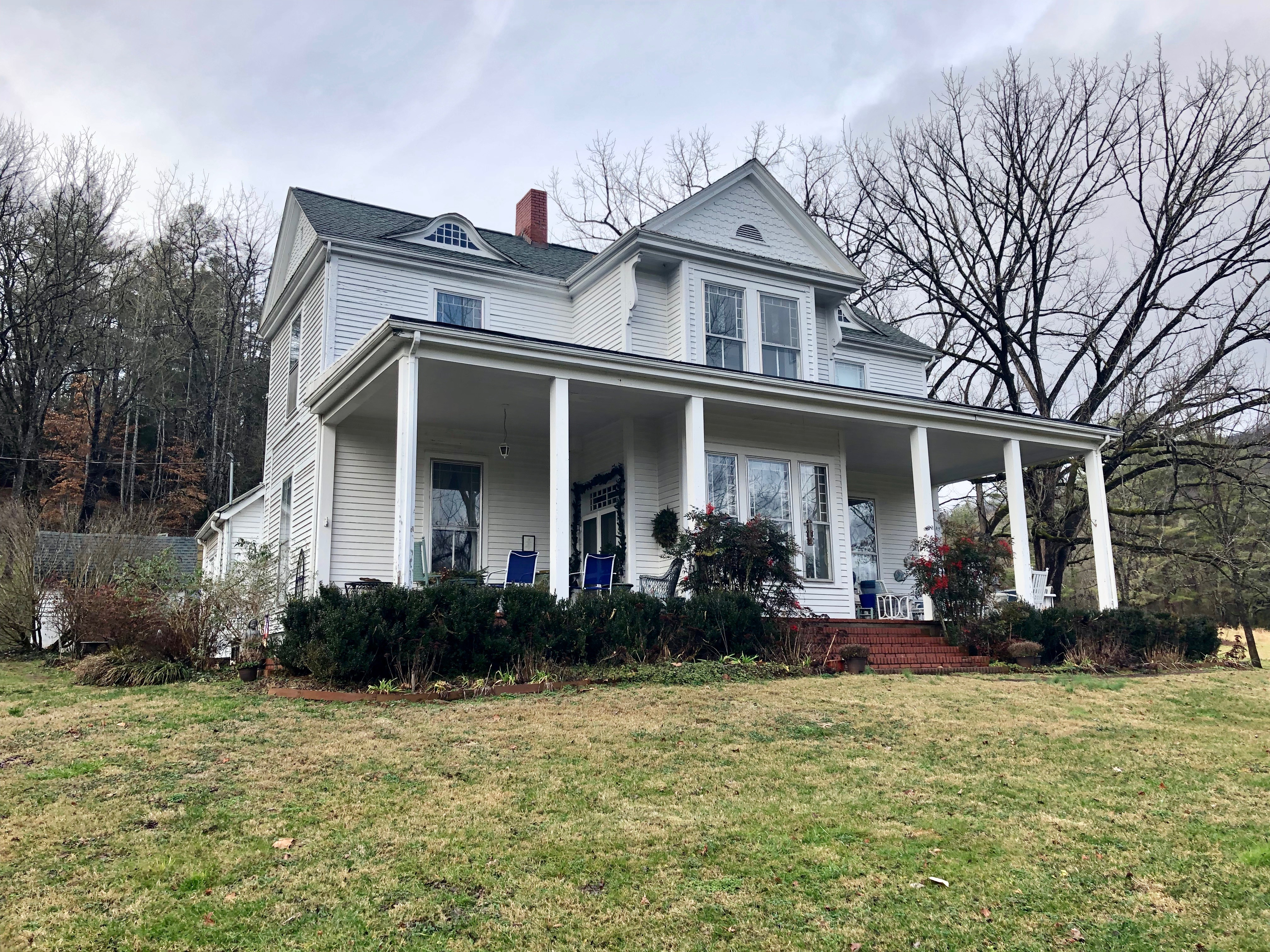
Lucius Coleman Hall House (1891)

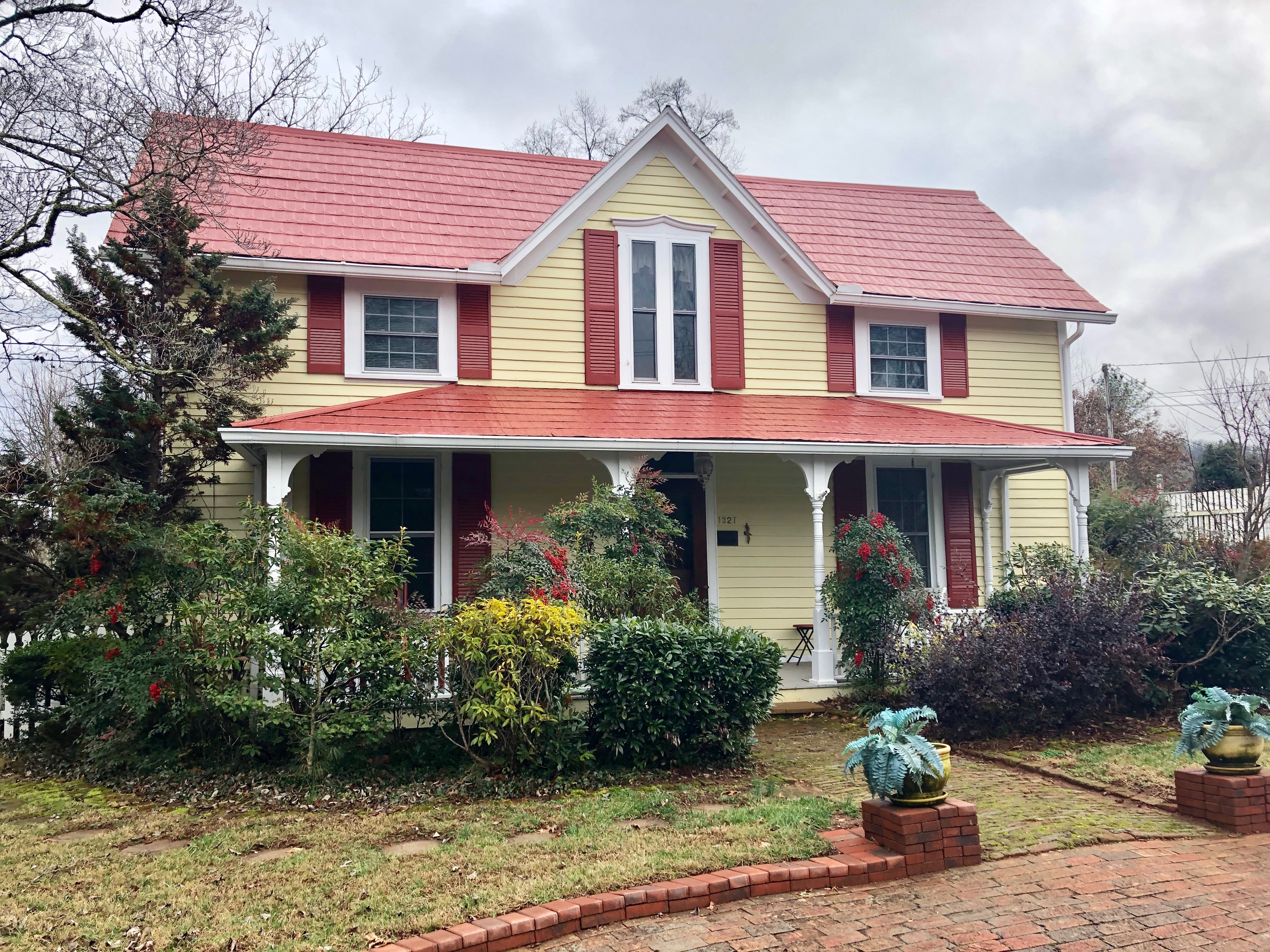
Walter E. Moore House (1886)

== See also ==
- National Register of Historic Places listings in Jackson County, North Carolina
