= Cullowhee, North Carolina =

- Census-designated place
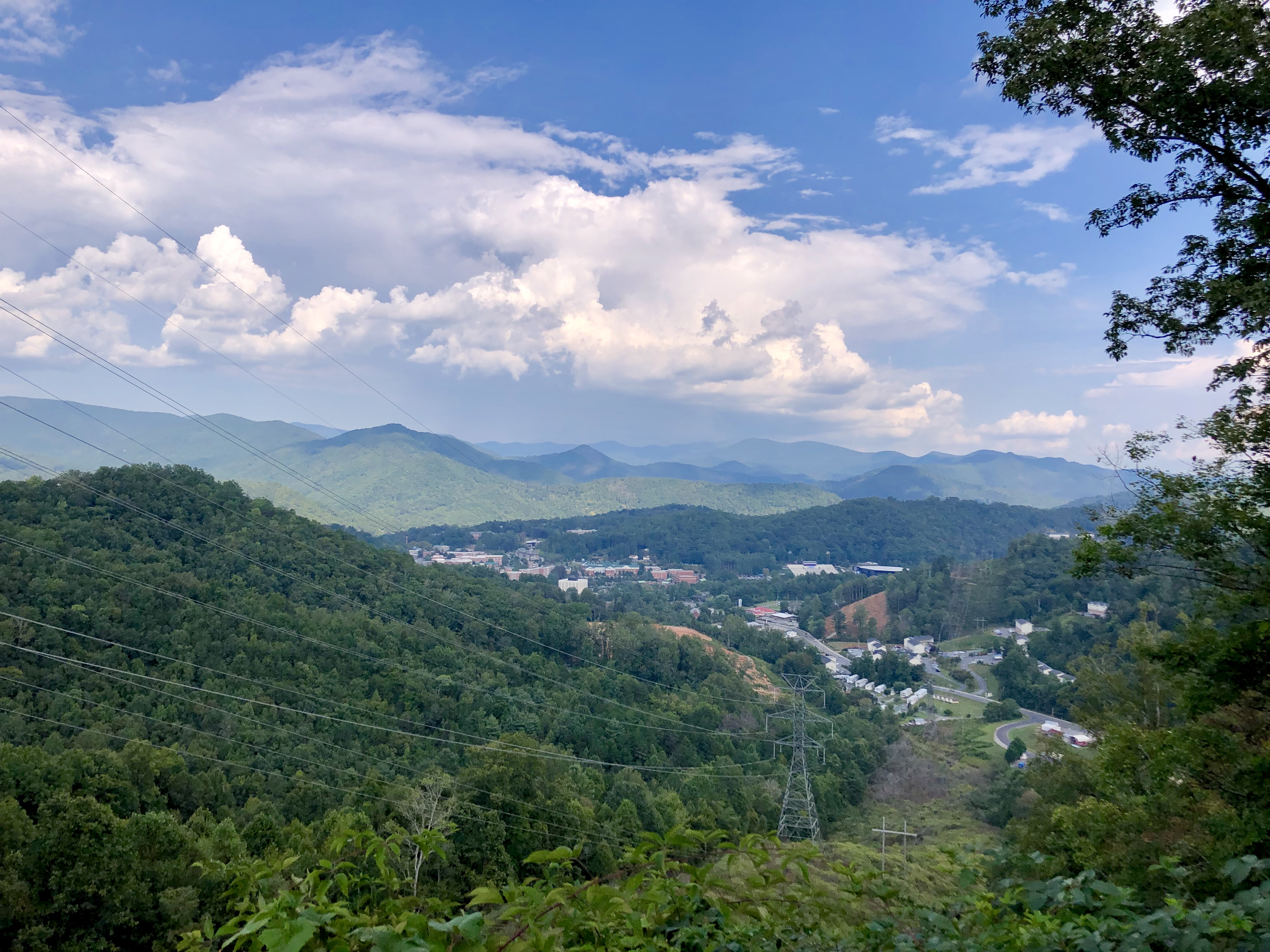
- Cullowhee, the Valley of the Lilies

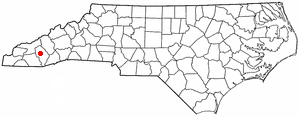
- Location of Cullowhee, North Carolina
- Coordinates: 35°18′35″N 83°10′54″W
- Country: United States
- State: North Carolina
- County: Jackson

Area
  - Total: 3.81 sq mi (9.86 km^{2})
  - Land: 3.81 sq mi (9.86 km^{2})
  - Water: 0 sq mi (0.00 km^{2})
- Elevation: 2,156 ft (657 m)

Population (2020)
  - Total: 7,682
  - Density: 2,017.4/sq mi (778.91/km^{2})
- Time zone: UTC−5 (Eastern (EST))
  - Summer (DST): UTC−4 (EDT)
- ZIP Code: 28723
- Area code: 828
- FIPS code: 37-15880
- GNIS feature ID: 2402390

Cullowhee (/ˈkʌləhwiː/) is a census-designated place (CDP) in Jackson County, North Carolina, United States. It is located on the Tuckasegee River, and the permanent population was 7,682 at the 2020 census, up from 6,228 at the 2010 census.

The community is the home of Western Carolina University, part of the University of North Carolina System. Developing from a high school and normal school, it has 12,000 students and has become a strong influence in community life. The Jackson County Airport is located just outside the CDP limits.

The present community developed at the site of a historic Cherokee town, which was centered around the earthwork Cullowhee Mound. The name was long thought to mean "Valley of the Lilies". In fact, it is derived from the Cherokee phrase joolth-cullah-wee, which translates as "Judacullah's Place." Judacullah, a giant warrior and hunter who the Cherokee believe lived in the area, is an important figure in their religion and culture.

== History ==
Developed along a mountain river valley and by a creek, Cullowhee was known as a historic Cherokee village centered around an earthwork platform mound estimated to have been built by 1000 CE by people of the South Appalachian Mississippian culture. Archeological evidence from excavations at Cullowhee Mound suggests that this area had been occupied since 3000 BCE by cultures of indigenous peoples. The historic Cherokee developed a style of public architecture characterized by building large town houses, or council houses, on top of the mounds. This was the center place for the community to gather, and the town elders to meet in council. It expressed the consensus nature of their society.

The Cherokee were forced to cede their land in this area in the early nineteenth century. When European-American settlers moved in, they occupied the site of the former Cherokee village. Cullowhee became one of the first European-American settlements in Jackson County. Residents reportedly founded the first school in the area, a one-room school in 1830. They developed the floodplain area for agriculture. The settlers cleared more land during the 1800s than the Cherokee had cultivated.

In 1883, Roland A. Painter founded Painter Post Office, located in his store on the Old Cullowhee Road. Other businesses clustered there. The post office was renamed as "Cullowhee" in 1908, taking over from another post office in the vicinity of nearby Forest Hills.

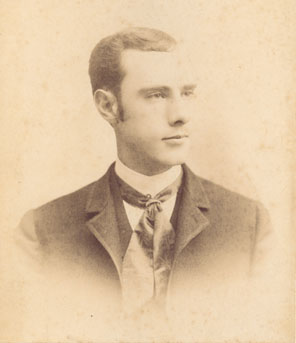
Robert Lee Madison, founder of Cullowhee High School.

In 1889, Cullowhee High School was founded by Robert Lee Madison. It eventually developed as a normal school for teacher training. Later its offerings were expanded into a four-year college curriculum, and ultimately graduate departments supporting today's Western Carolina University.

The institution ceased to be named a high school in 1923. A new brick building was opened serving grades 1–11. In 1940, a massive flood caused severe damage to the business district, destroying almost all the buildings on the north side of the river. The buildings on the south side survived, though waterlogged. The flood crested at 21 feet (6.4 m) above Cullowhee Dam, the highest on record.

Since then, dams have been built for flood control on the East and West forks of the Tuckasegee River. When the area rebuilt, buildings were developed on the higher ground around Old Cullowhee Road, and the area closer to the river floodplain was abandoned. The mid-century buildings have since become outdated, particularly compared to newer developments.

Businesses in the Old Cullowhee Road area declined in the late 20th century after it was bypassed by the relocation of highway N.C. 107 in the late 1970s to early 1980s. But, since the 1960s, the development of Western Carolina University has stimulated growth around its large campus. In the 21st century, the university has 12,000 students, and offers a variety of related sports and cultural programs. Cullowhee has also been a destination for retirees and people with second homes, resulting in new residential construction.

The university has proposed a new Town Center to incorporate some of its land. (See "Plans" below). Businessmen are also collaborating on revitalization of Old Cullowhee Road, and many new homes are being built or planned for the area.

As noted, the town has had a public school since 1923, which has been in four buildings. It has always been associated with teacher training at the college (and now university). It was established as Cullowhee Training School, serving until 1939. It was replaced by the McKee Training School, which served until 1964. Both of these buildings were located on what is now the university campus. From 1964 to 1994, the public school was known as Cordelia Camp Laboratory School, still associated with educational programs at the university. The Cullowhee Valley School is the latest structure holding the school, which now serves grades K-8. Students go to Sylva for high school.

The oldest surviving European-American structure in the area is St. David's in the Valley church, which was built in 1880. The Joyner Building and Judaculla Rock are each listed on the National Register of Historic Places.

A Walton Family Foundation report ranked the Cullowhee micropolitan area (Jackson County) as number 13 in the United States. Reasons included the area's status as a tourist destination and "superior job growth, wage increases and young businesses."

== Geography ==
Cullowhee is located in central Jackson County in the valley of the Tuckasegee River. North Carolina Highway 107 runs through the community, leading north 6 miles (10 km) to Sylva, the Jackson county seat, and southeast 7 miles (11 km) to Tuckasegee.

According to the United States Census Bureau, the Cullowhee CDP has a total area of 3.5 square miles (9.1 km^{2}), all land.

=== Climate ===
Cullowhee typically has a rather mild winter season. In the summer, high temperatures can reach into the 90s Fahrenheit (32-plus degrees Celsius).

Climate data for Cullowhee, North Carolina (1991–2020 normals, extremes 1909–present)
Month	Jan	Feb	Mar	Apr	May	Jun	Jul	Aug	Sep	Oct	Nov	Dec	Year
Record high °F (°C)	79 (26)	79 (26)	87 (31)	91 (33)	92 (33)	98 (37)	99 (37)	98 (37)	97 (36)	97 (36)	82 (28)	80 (27)	99 (37)
Mean daily maximum °F (°C)	48.5 (9.2)	52.8 (11.6)	60.8 (16.0)	70.3 (21.3)	77.0 (25.0)	82.4 (28.0)	85.3 (29.6)	84.3 (29.1)	79.1 (26.2)	70.0 (21.1)	59.9 (15.5)	51.1 (10.6)	68.5 (20.3)
Daily mean °F (°C)	37.1 (2.8)	40.5 (4.7)	47.4 (8.6)	55.9 (13.3)	63.8 (17.7)	70.5 (21.4)	74.0 (23.3)	73.0 (22.8)	67.5 (19.7)	56.9 (13.8)	46.4 (8.0)	39.9 (4.4)	56.1 (13.4)
Mean daily minimum °F (°C)	25.6 (−3.6)	28.2 (−2.1)	34.0 (1.1)	41.6 (5.3)	50.5 (10.3)	58.6 (14.8)	62.7 (17.1)	61.7 (16.5)	55.8 (13.2)	43.8 (6.6)	33.0 (0.6)	28.7 (−1.8)	43.7 (6.5)
Record low °F (°C)	−19 (−28)	−14 (−26)	−1 (−18)	17 (−8)	26 (−3)	33 (1)	43 (6)	38 (3)	27 (−3)	14 (−10)	4 (−16)	−11 (−24)	−19 (−28)
Average precipitation inches (mm)	4.85 (123)	4.56 (116)	4.64 (118)	4.72 (120)	4.34 (110)	5.12 (130)	5.01 (127)	4.30 (109)	4.31 (109)	3.22 (82)	4.04 (103)	5.07 (129)	54.18 (1,376)
Average snowfall inches (cm)	1.3 (3.3)	0.7 (1.8)	0.7 (1.8)	0.0 (0.0)	0.0 (0.0)	0.0 (0.0)	0.0 (0.0)	0.0 (0.0)	0.0 (0.0)	0.1 (0.25)	0.0 (0.0)	1.5 (3.8)	4.3 (11)
Average precipitation days (≥ 0.01 in)	11.1	11.0	12.1	10.9	12.0	13.9	14.0	12.6	9.7	7.7	9.2	11.3	135.5
Average snowy days (≥ 0.1 in)	0.8	0.5	0.3	0.0	0.0	0.0	0.0	0.0	0.0	0.0	0.0	1.0	2.6
Source: NOAA

== Demographics ==
Historical population
Census	Pop.	Note	%±
2010	6,228		—
2020	7,682		23.3%
U.S. Decennial Census

=== 2020 census ===
Cullowhee racial composition
Race	Number	Percentage
White (non-Hispanic)	5,996	78.05%
Black or African American (non-Hispanic)	391	5.09%
Native American	67	0.87%
Asian	111	1.44%
Pacific Islander	2	0.03%
Other/Mixed	328	4.27%
Hispanic or Latino	787	10.24%

As of the 2020 census, Cullowhee had a population of 7,682. The median age was 20.7 years. 4.6% of residents were under the age of 18 and 3.7% of residents were 65 years of age or older. For every 100 females there were 92.8 males, and for every 100 females age 18 and over there were 91.3 males age 18 and over.

99.5% of residents lived in urban areas, while 0.5% lived in rural areas.

There were 1,739 households in Cullowhee, of which 12.2% had children under the age of 18 living in them. Of all households, 14.9% were married-couple households, 38.1% were households with a male householder and no spouse or partner present, and 38.4% were households with a female householder and no spouse or partner present. About 44.9% of all households were made up of individuals and 4.9% had someone living alone who was 65 years of age or older.

There were 2,366 housing units, of which 26.5% were vacant. The homeowner vacancy rate was 4.8% and the rental vacancy rate was 9.4%.

=== 2010 census ===
As of the census of 2010, there were 6,228 people.

=== 2000 census ===
As of the 2000 census, there were 716 households, and 272 families residing in the CDP. The population density was 983.1 inhabitants per square mile (379.6/km^{2}). There were 823 housing units at an average density of 226.1 per square mile (87.3/km^{2}). The racial makeup of the CDP was 88.91% White, 7.24% African American, 0.95% Native American, 1.34% Asian, 0.08% Pacific Islander, 0.53% from other races, and 0.95% from two or more races. Hispanic or Latino of any race were 1.31% of the population.

There were 716 households, of which 17.5% had children under the age of 18 living with them, 28.1% were married couples living together, 7.3% had a female householder with no husband present, and 61.9% were non-families. Households made up of individuals represented 35.9%, and 5.0% had someone living alone who was 65 years of age or older. The average household size was 2.01 and the average family size was 2.72.

In the CDP, the population was spread out, with 5.9% under the age of 18, 72.8% from 18 to 24, 11.0% from 25 to 44, 7.0% from 45 to 64, and 3.2% who were 65 years of age or older. The median age was 21 years. Both the overall age distribution and the median age are driven by the presence of Western Carolina University. For every 100 females age 18 and over, there were 84.4 males.

The median income for a household in the CDP was $19,688, and the median income for a family was $36,538. Males had a median income of $26,161 versus $16,607 for females. The per capita income for the CDP was $10,017. About 25.2% of families and 41.5% of the population were below the poverty line, including 37.3% of those under age 18 and 9.6% of those age 65 or over.

== Education ==
Western Carolina University is a constituent campus of the University of North Carolina system. WCU is the fifth-oldest institution in the UNC system. It was founded in 1889 with a few hundred students in a small, one-story wood building. In the 21st century, it has more than 12,000 students, offering approximately 220 majors and concentrations for undergraduates, and more than 45 graduate-level programs of study. The campus covers approximately 600 acres (240 ha) and takes up much of the Cullowhee Valley.

It has created a Cherokee Studies program, including language immersion study, in collaboration with the Eastern Band of Cherokee Indians, the only federally recognized tribe in the state. It is based in Cherokee, North Carolina, at Qualla Boundary. WCU faculty have also worked with EBCI representatives on surveys of historic town and earthwork mound sites, to create a database of known resources; archeological and anthropological studies conducted with outreach to the Cherokee people to gain their perspective from tribal oral histories, and other programs. More than 50 platform mound sites have been identified in the eleven westernmost counties of North Carolina.

The public K thru 8 school, Cullowhee Valley School, opened in 1994. It replaced a 30-year-old structure on the University's Campus. Since 1988, when the town's high school closed, students of high school age attend Smoky Mountain High School in nearby Sylva.

== Plans ==
Forest Hills, an incorporated village just south of Cullowhee, is considering a WCU plan to incorporate as the town/city of Cullowhee, annexing areas along Old Cullowhee Road and NC 107. The university plan proposes development around Old Cullowhee Road to create a traditional downtown, with mixed-use buildings, a city hall, homes, walkable neighborhoods, supermarket, and trails/parks along the river and throughout the area. The elementary school could be relocated here, as well as the Post Office and other town/city functions. A "town center" to be constructed on some 35 acres (14 ha) owned by WCU is an area targeted for annexation and development.

The plan is controversial, as it may attract business away from Old Cullowhee Road and would be intended to attract chain stores and businesses, rather than local small businesses. The "town center" is proposed to accommodate as much as 270,000 square feet (25,000 m^{2}) of commercial, housing and multi-tenant office space, with parking for 871 vehicles. A 320-space parking garage is proposed on 22 acres of land owned by the university. The land is now the site of the Cordelia Camp Outreach Center (former Cordelia Camp Laboratory School, built in 1964), intramural fields, and several parking lots. The annexation will also include the area that is the business district on Old Cullowhee Road (S.R. 1002) near the old campus entrance.

An alternative vision for redevelopment is offered by the Cullowhee Revitalization Endeavor (CuRvE), made up of local businessmen and activists who also want to rejuvenate the once-thriving commerce center. CuRvE wants to make Cullowhee "a unique and highly attractive area—a mix of residences and businesses along rivers and streams". According to CuRvE, its vision has more community support than that the Western Carolina University "town center", because it would allow small businesses. In addition, it would make use of the setting of Old Cullowhee Road along a mountain river.

== Notable people ==
- Zebby Matthews, Professional baseball pitcher for the Minnesota Twins
- Cal Raleigh, Professional baseball player for the Seattle Mariners
- Nick Searcy, actor

== Gallery ==
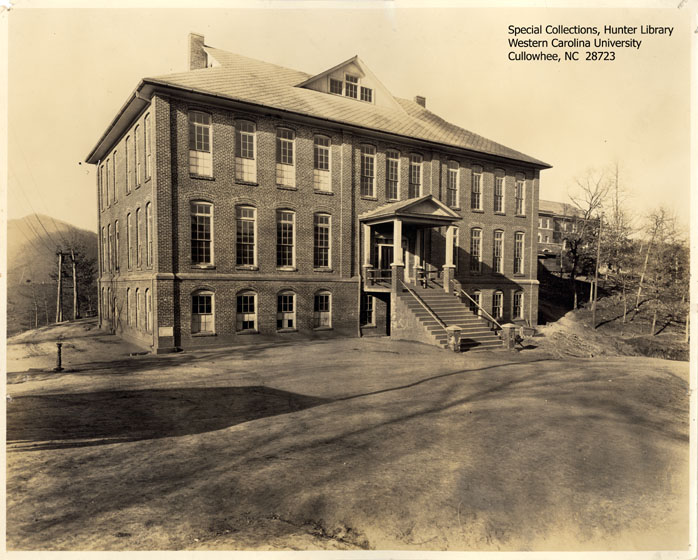
The Joyner Building was the main Western Carolina University building from 1916 until 1939.

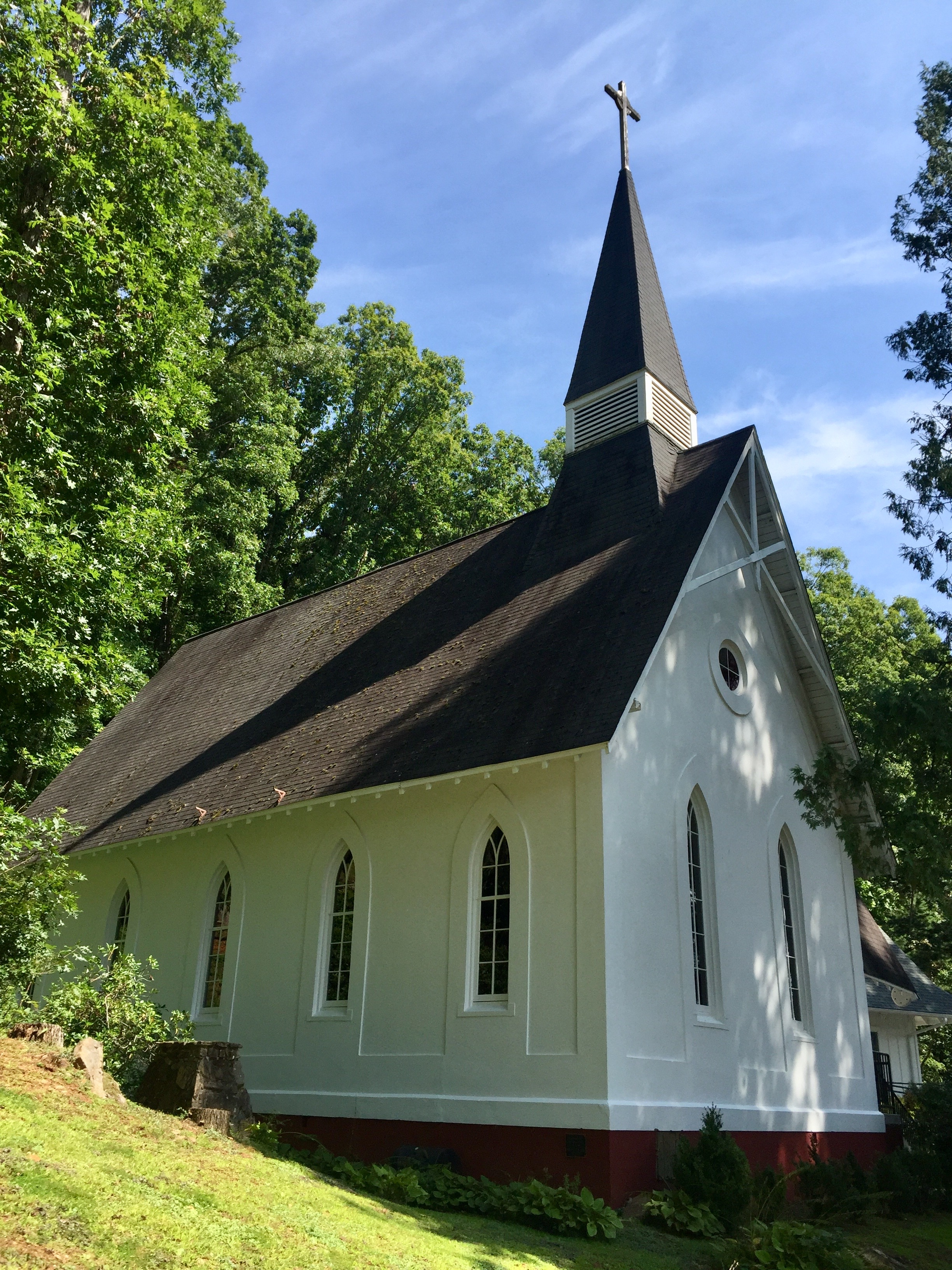
St. David's-in-the-Valley Church (1886)

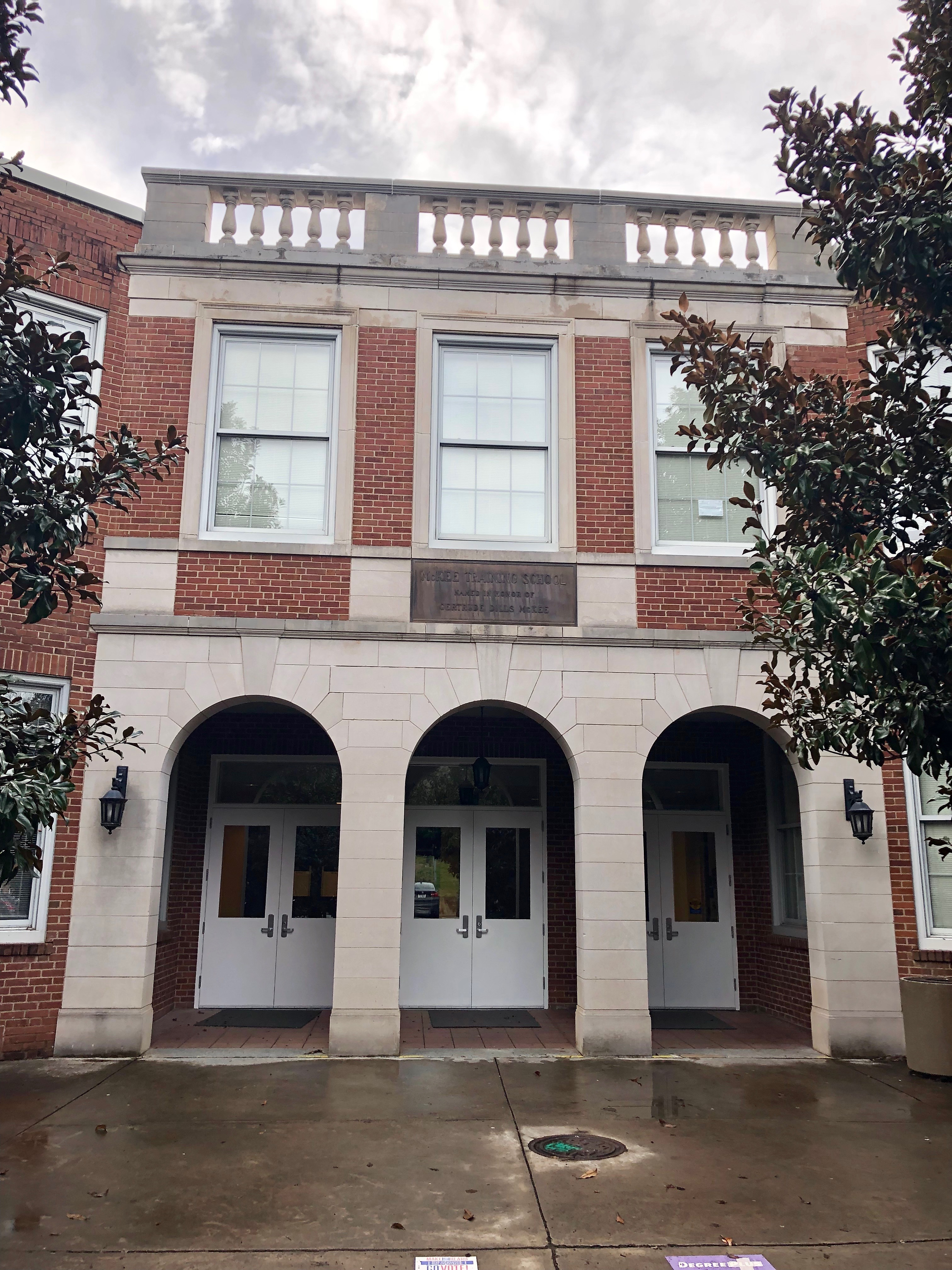
Former McKee Training School (1939)

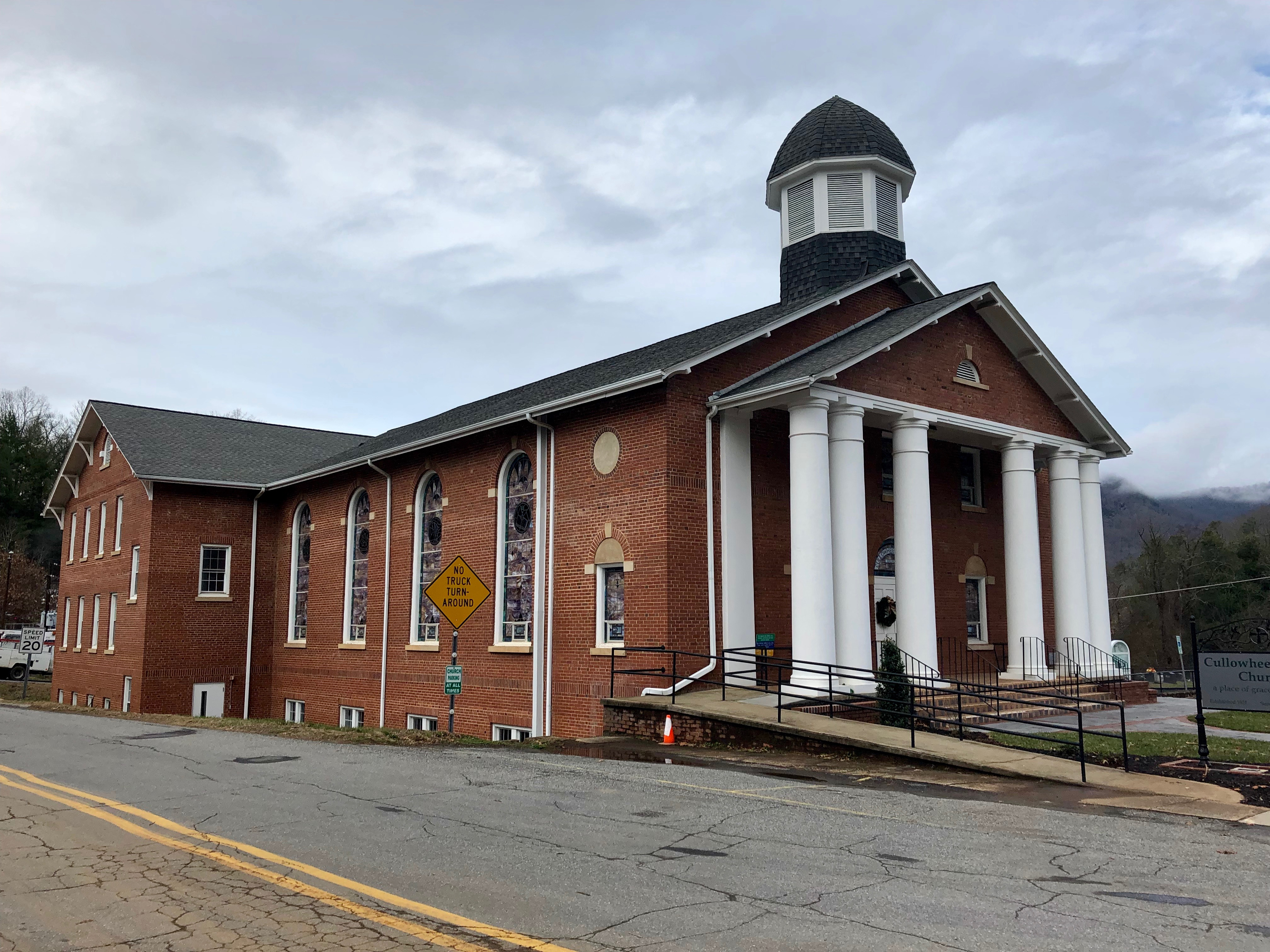
Cullowhee Baptist Church

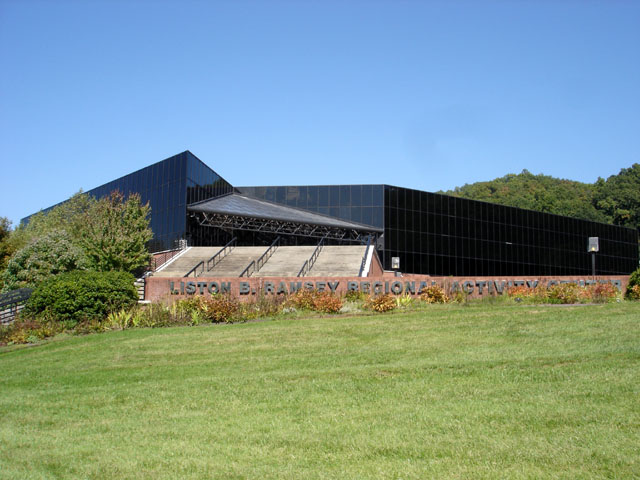
The Ramsey Center hosts many local events, as well as many of the major Western Carolina University sports programs.

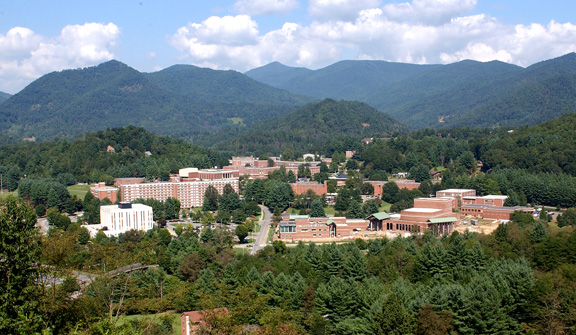
Western Carolina University in 2007, before work on the Quad, new dormitories, and Courtyard Cafeteria started

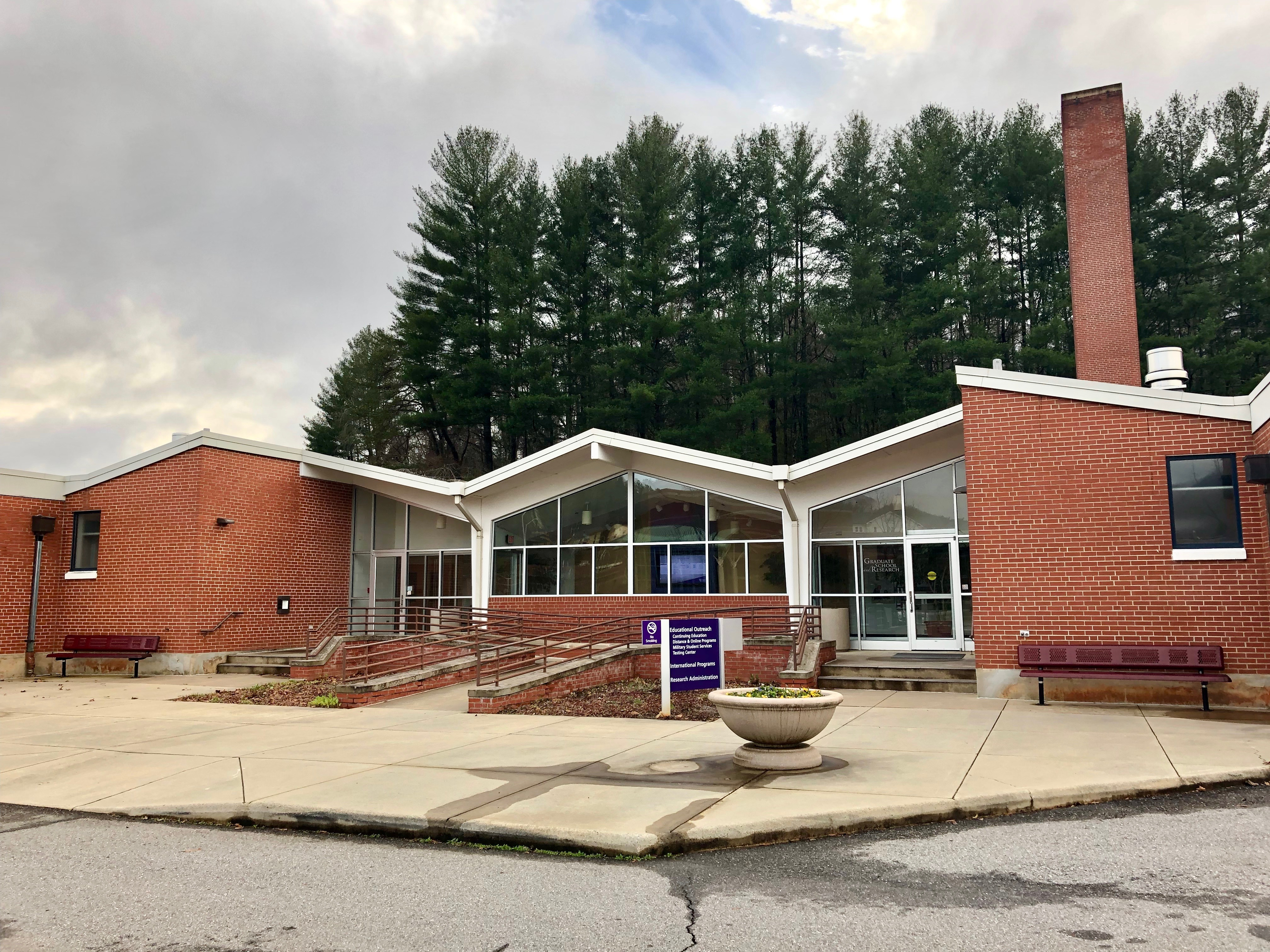
Cordelia Camp Building (ex-Cordelia Camp Laboratory School), Western Carolina University (1964)

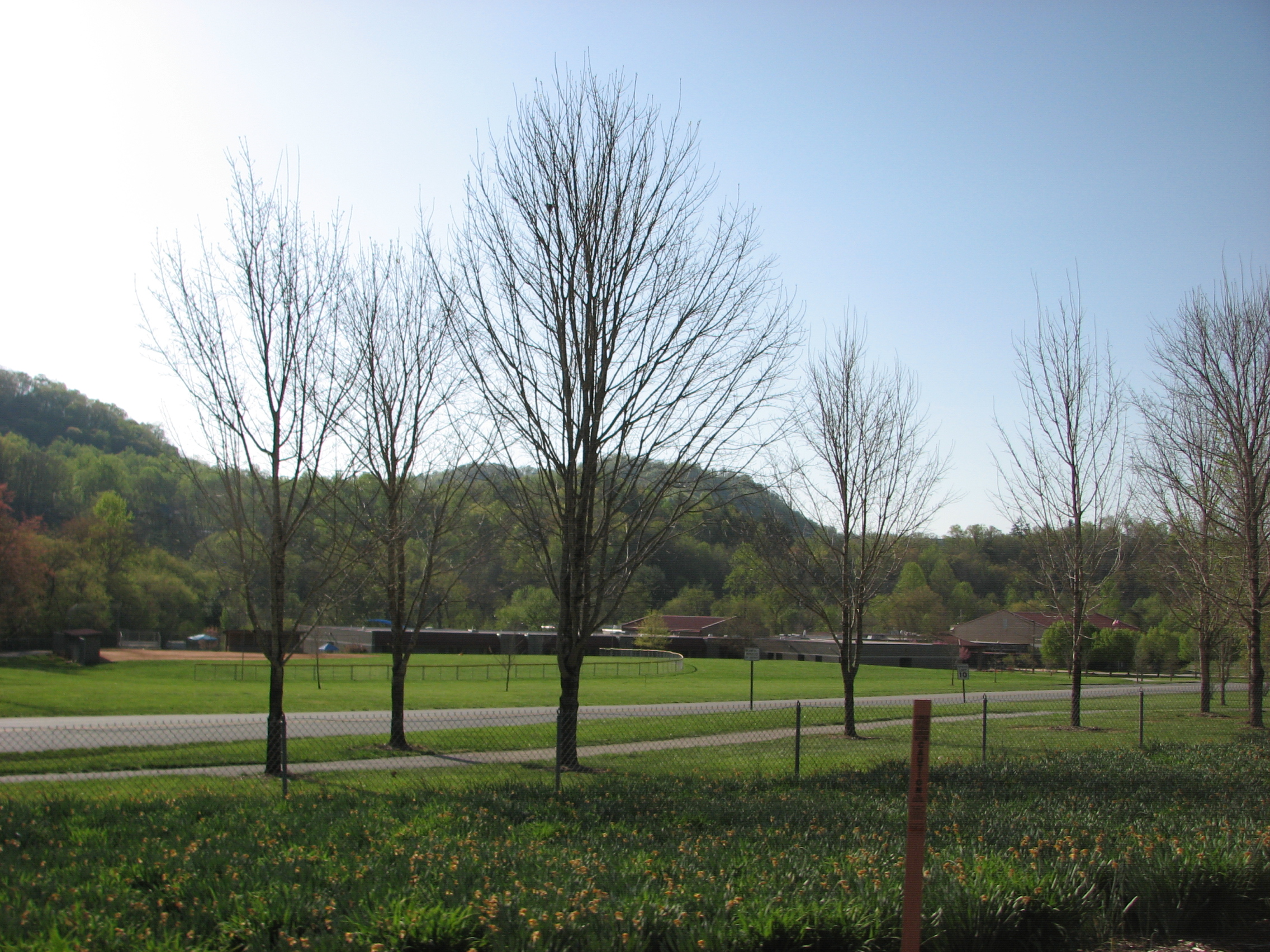
Cullowhee Valley K–8 School, located along NC 107

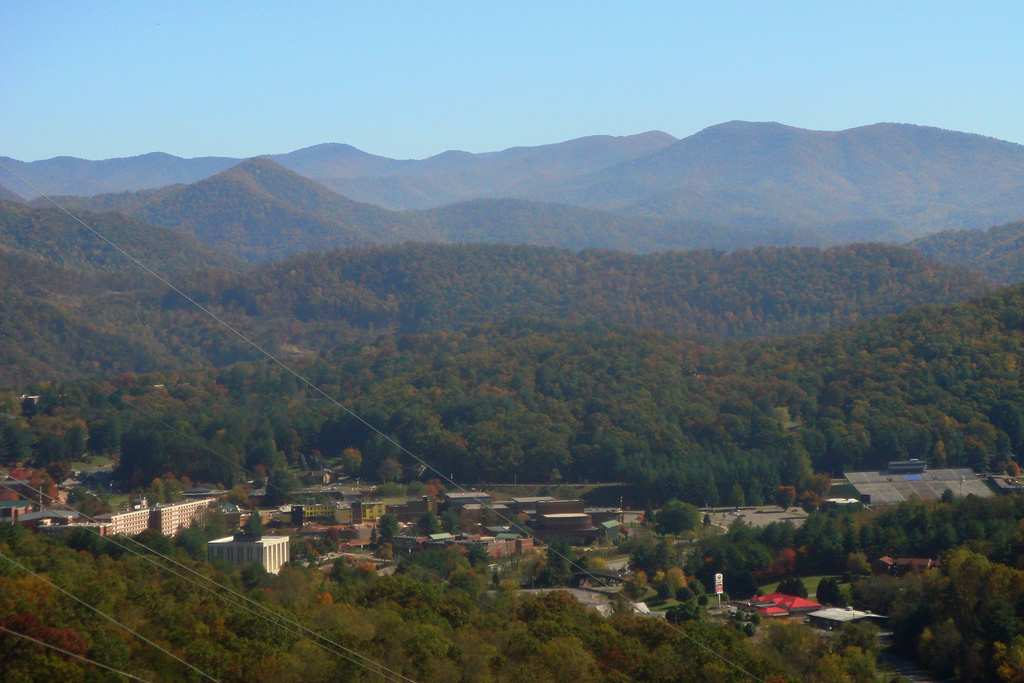
Cullowhee as seen from the Jackson County Airport on Berry Ridge above Little Savannah Road

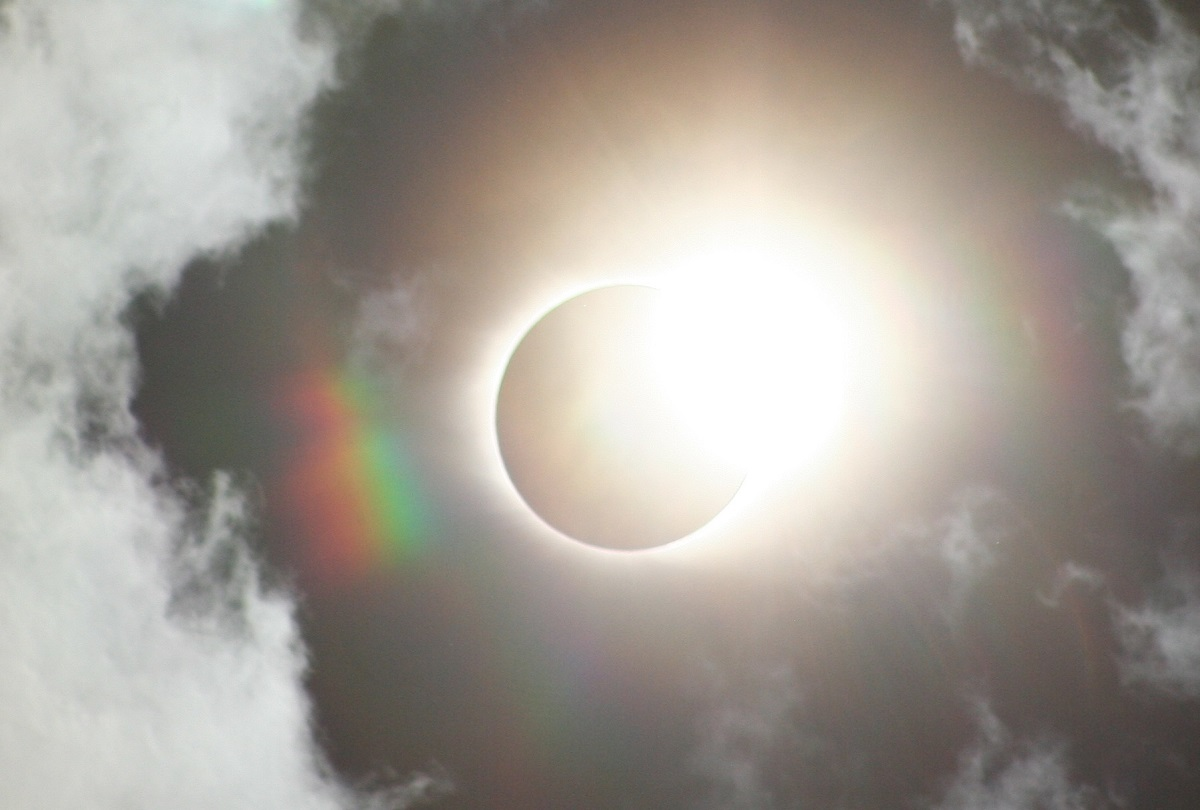
A solar eclipse passed over Cullowhee on August 21, 2017. This is an image as viewed from the campus of WCU.

== See also ==
- National Register of Historic Places listings in Jackson County, North Carolina
