= Monroe M. Redden =

American politician

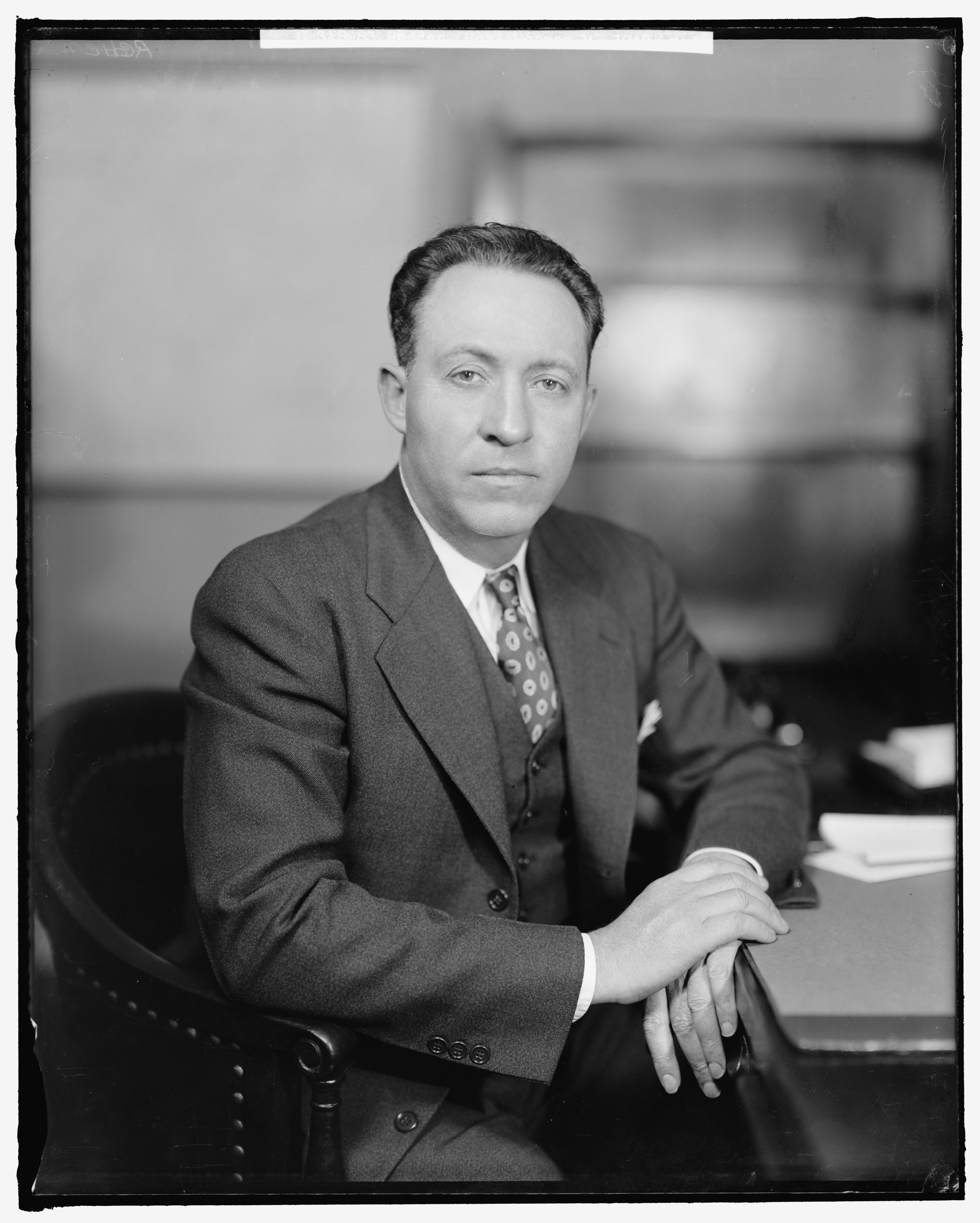

Member of the U.S. House of Representatives from North Carolina's 12th district
- In office January 3, 1947 – January 3, 1953
- Preceded by: Zebulon Weaver
- Succeeded by: George A. Shuford

Chair of the North Carolina Democratic Party
- In office 1942–1944
- Preceded by: Emery B. Denny
- Succeeded by: William B. Umstead

Personal details
- Born: Monroe Minor Redden; September 24, 1901 Hendersonville, North Carolina, U.S.
- Died: December 16, 1987 (aged 86) Hendersonville, North Carolina, U.S.
- Party: Democratic
- Education: Wake Forest College

Monroe Minor Redden (September 24, 1901 – December 16, 1987) was a Democratic U.S. Congressman from North Carolina between 1947 and 1953.

Redden was born in Hendersonville, North Carolina; he attended public schools and then Wake Forest College, graduating from its law school in 1923. He, and a younger brother (Arthur Redden), practiced law in Hendersonville, where he also chaired the Henderson County Democratic party from 1930 to 1946.

Redden rose to chair the North Carolina Democratic Party executive committee from 1942 to 1944. In 1946, he ran for the U.S. House and won, serving for a total of three terms (January 3, 1947 – January 3, 1953). The candidate of corporate clients, he defeated the fourteen-term incumbent, a New Dealer, in the 1946 House primary. Henderson County, Redden's home, saw a 229% increase in the primary vote over the contested 1944 gubernatorial primary. Western North Carolina was known for its electoral chicanery. Uncontested in the next two primaries, Redden chose not to run in 1952, avoiding questions about his lobbying for a federal loan to a client, which made $50,000 for the legal practice of the Representative and his brother.

Redden was an active member of the House, sponsoring enacted legislation that addressed Virgin Islands governance, the Blue Ridge Parkway, and Cherokee Indians. His successful floor amendments dealt with rent control, foreign aid, minimum wage, and equal rights.

Redden retired from Congress in 1952 and returned to his law practice. He was president of the Southern Heritage Life Insurance Company, from 1956 to 1959. Redden died in his hometown of Hendersonville in 1987.

U.S. House of Representatives
Preceded by Zebulon Weaver	Member of the U.S. House of Representatives from North Carolina's 12th congressional district 1947–1953	Succeeded by George A. Shuford
