= Joyner Building =

Destroyed university building in North Carolina, US

- U.S. National Register of Historic Places
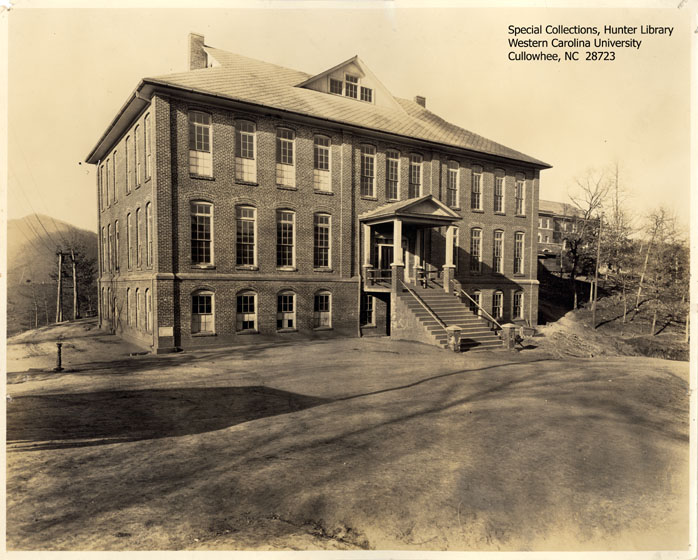
- Joyner Building in the 1920s

- Location within North Carolina Location within the United States
- Location: Western Carolina University Campus, Cullowhee, North Carolina
- Coordinates: 35°18′40″N 83°10′40″W
- Area: less than one acre
- Built: 1913-1914
- Architects: Wilson & Wamack
- NRHP reference No.: 78001961
- Added to NRHP: December 8, 1978

The Joyner Building was a historic classroom/administration building located on the campus of Western Carolina University in Cullowhee, Jackson County, North Carolina. brick Colonial It was built in 1913–1914, and was a two-story on a raised basement, T-shaped red brick building with a cross-gable-on-hip roof. The main block was 11 bays wide and six bays deep.

In 1978, it was added to the National Register of Historic Places. It was destroyed by fire in 1981, and the site is now the location of Joyner Plaza near the Moore Building.

== Uses ==
Joyner Building was destroyed by fire on January 15, 1981. It was about to undergo renovation. Built in 1913–1914, it had over the year housed classrooms, labs, administrative offices, the college post office, college shop, college library, and college book exchange for decades. At the time of the fire, it was the oldest building on campus and was being used as the home of the Western Carolinian (WCU's college newspaper), and as a meeting place for student organizations. The ruins were deemed a hazard and were knocked down the following week. The site is now Joyner Plaza. The oldest buildings on campus are now Moore (1917–1924) and the Steam Plant (1924)

== See also ==
- National Register of Historic Places listings in Jackson County, North Carolina
- List of Registered Historic Places in North Carolina
