= George A. Shuford =

American politician

George Shuford
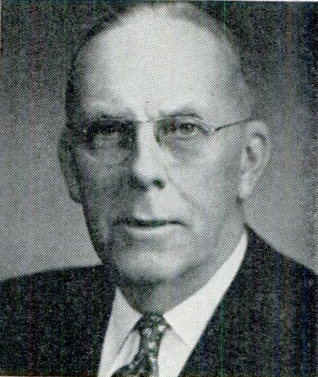
- Official portrait, 1955

Member of the U.S. House of Representatives from North Carolina's 12th district
- In office January 3, 1953 – January 3, 1959
- Preceded by: Monroe Minor Redden
- Succeeded by: David McKee Hall

Member of the North Carolina House of Representatives from Buncombe County
- In office November 7, 1944 – November 2, 1948
- Preceded by: A. C. Reynolds Jr.
- Succeeded by: Leslie H. McDaniel

Personal details
- Born: September 5, 1895 Asheville, North Carolina
- Died: December 8, 1962 (aged 67) Asheville, North Carolina
- Resting place: Riverside Cemetery
- Party: Democratic
- Education: University of Georgia

Military service
- Branch/service: United States Army
- Unit: 119th Infantry Regiment
- Battles/wars: World War I

George Adams Shuford (September 5, 1895 – December 8, 1962) was an American politician who was a U.S. Representative from North Carolina.

Born in Asheville, North Carolina, Shuford attended the public schools and the University of North Carolina 1913-1915. He graduated from the University of Georgia at Athens in 1917. He was admitted to the Georgia bar in 1917. During the First World War, he entered the first officers' training camp at Fort McPherson, Georgia, in May 1917. He was commissioned a second lieutenant in August 1917 and assigned to the 119th Infantry Regiment of the 30th Infantry Division. He became a first lieutenant in January 1918 and served in the United States and France. He was discharged at Camp Jackson, South Carolina, on April 28, 1919. He was admitted to the North Carolina bar in August 1920 and commenced practice in Asheville, North Carolina. He served as the chairman of the Buncombe County Board of Elections from 1940 to 1942. He served in the North Carolina House of Representatives from 1945 to 1947. He served as a state superior court judge from 1947 to 1949.

Shuford was elected as a Democrat to the Eighty-third, Eighty-fourth, and Eighty-fifth Congresses (January 3, 1953 – January 3, 1959), during which he was a signatory to the 1956 Southern Manifesto that opposed the desegregation of public schools ordered by the Supreme Court in Brown v. Board of Education. He was renominated for the Eighty-sixth Congress but later withdrew because of ill health, and resumed the practice of law. He resided in Asheville, North Carolina, until his death there on December 8, 1962. He was interred in Riverside Cemetery.

== Sources ==
- United States Congress. "George A. Shuford (id: S000390)". Biographical Directory of the United States Congress.

U.S. House of Representatives
Preceded by Monroe Minor Redden	Member of the U.S. House of Representatives from North Carolina's 12th congressional district 1953–1959	Succeeded by David McKee Hall
