= Walter E. Moore House =

Historic house in North Carolina, United States

- U.S. National Register of Historic Places
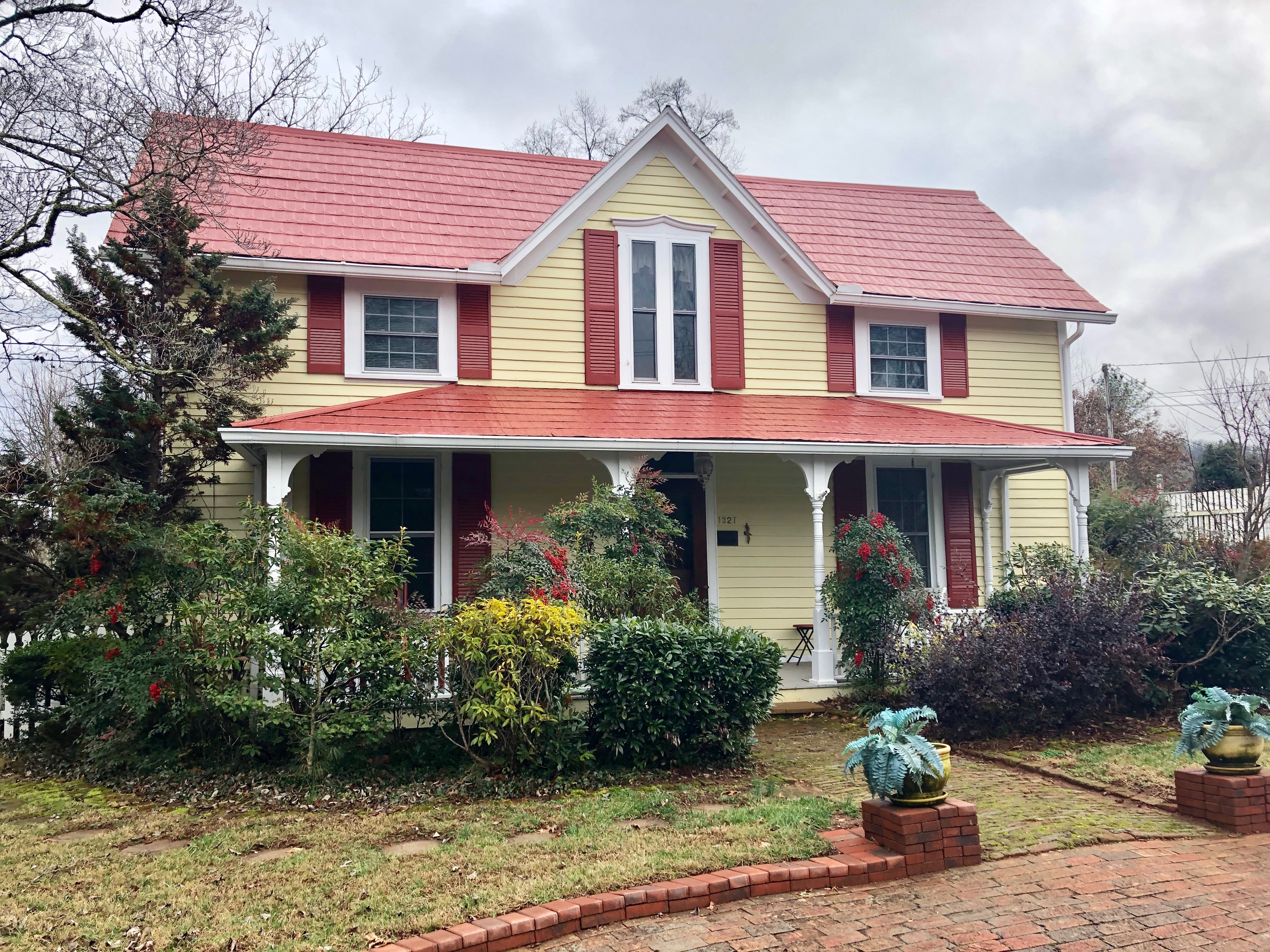
- Walter E. Moore House

- Location within North Carolina Location within the United States
- Location: Main St., Webster, North Carolina
- Coordinates: 35°20′39″N 83°16′30″W
- Area: 0.8 acres (0.32 ha)
- Built: 1886
- Architectural style: Gothic, Vernacular Victorian
- NRHP reference No.: 90000322
- Added to NRHP: February 23, 1990

Walter E. Moore House is a historic home located at Webster, Jackson County, North Carolina. The house was built in 1886, and is a 1 1/2-story, three bay by one bay, "T"-plan, Vernacular Victorian-style frame dwelling, with a one-story original rear ell. It has a hipped roof porch with turned posts, balusters, and sawnwork brackets. Also on the property are the contributing well house and shed.

It was listed on the National Register of Historic Places in 1990.
