= Elisha Calor Hedden House =

Historic house in North Carolina, United States

- U.S. National Register of Historic Places
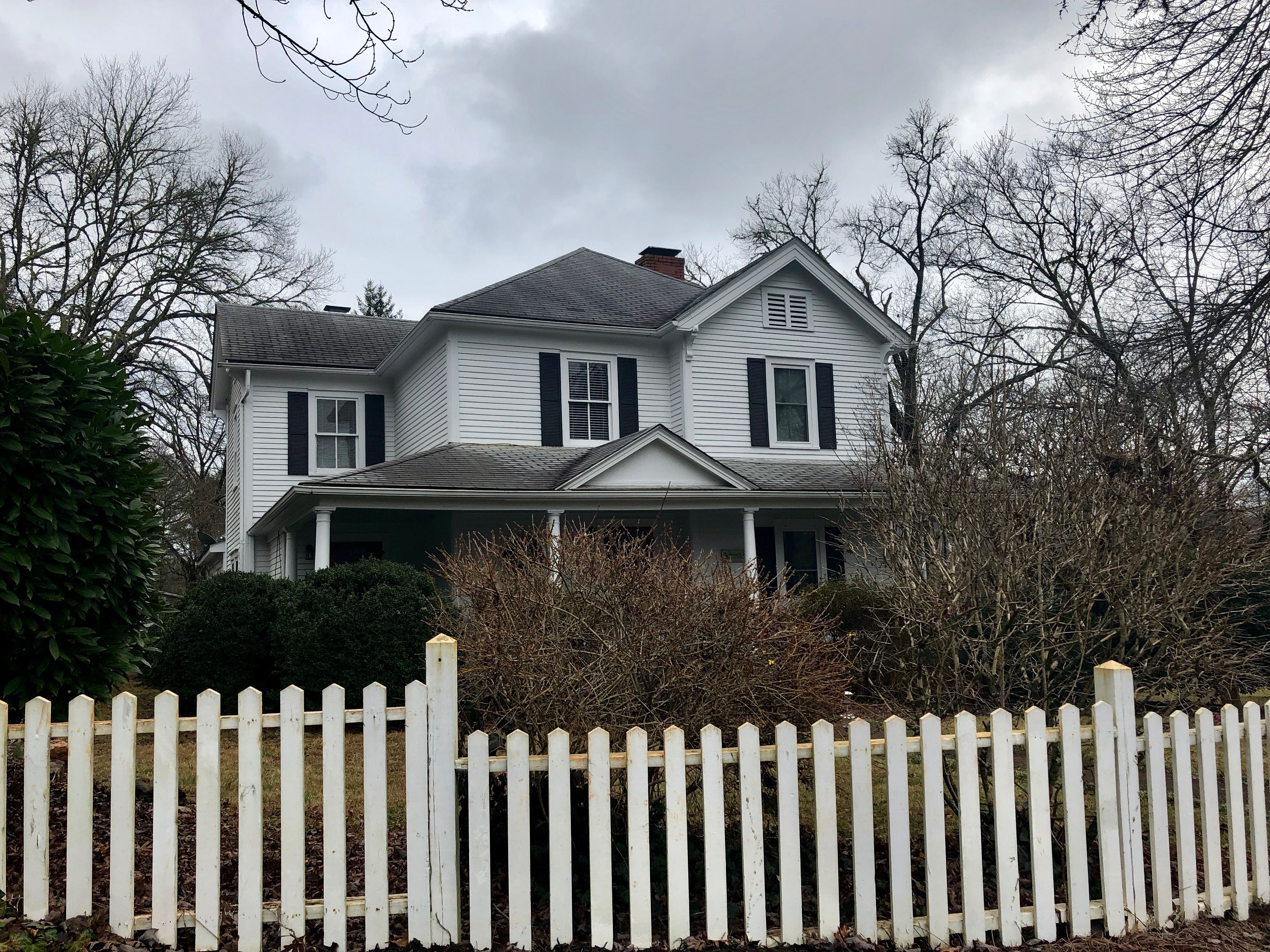
- Elisha Calor Hedden House

- Location within North Carolina Location within the United States
- Location: Main St. and Old Webster-Sylva Rd., Webster, North Carolina
- Coordinates: 35°20′47″N 83°13′8″W
- Area: 1.1 acres (0.45 ha)
- Built: 1910
- Architectural style: Queen Anne
- NRHP reference No.: 89002133
- Added to NRHP: December 21, 1989

Elisha Calor Hedden House is a historic home located at Webster, Jackson County, North Carolina. The house was built in 1910, and is a modest two-story, two-bay, Queen Anne-style frame dwelling. It has a hipped roof with projecting gable and cross-gables. It features a one-story, hipped roof, wraparound porch supported by slender Doric order columns. Also on the property is a contributing frame carriage house.

It was listed on the National Register of Historic Places in 1989.
