= Lucius Coleman Hall House =

Historic house in North Carolina, United States

- U.S. National Register of Historic Places
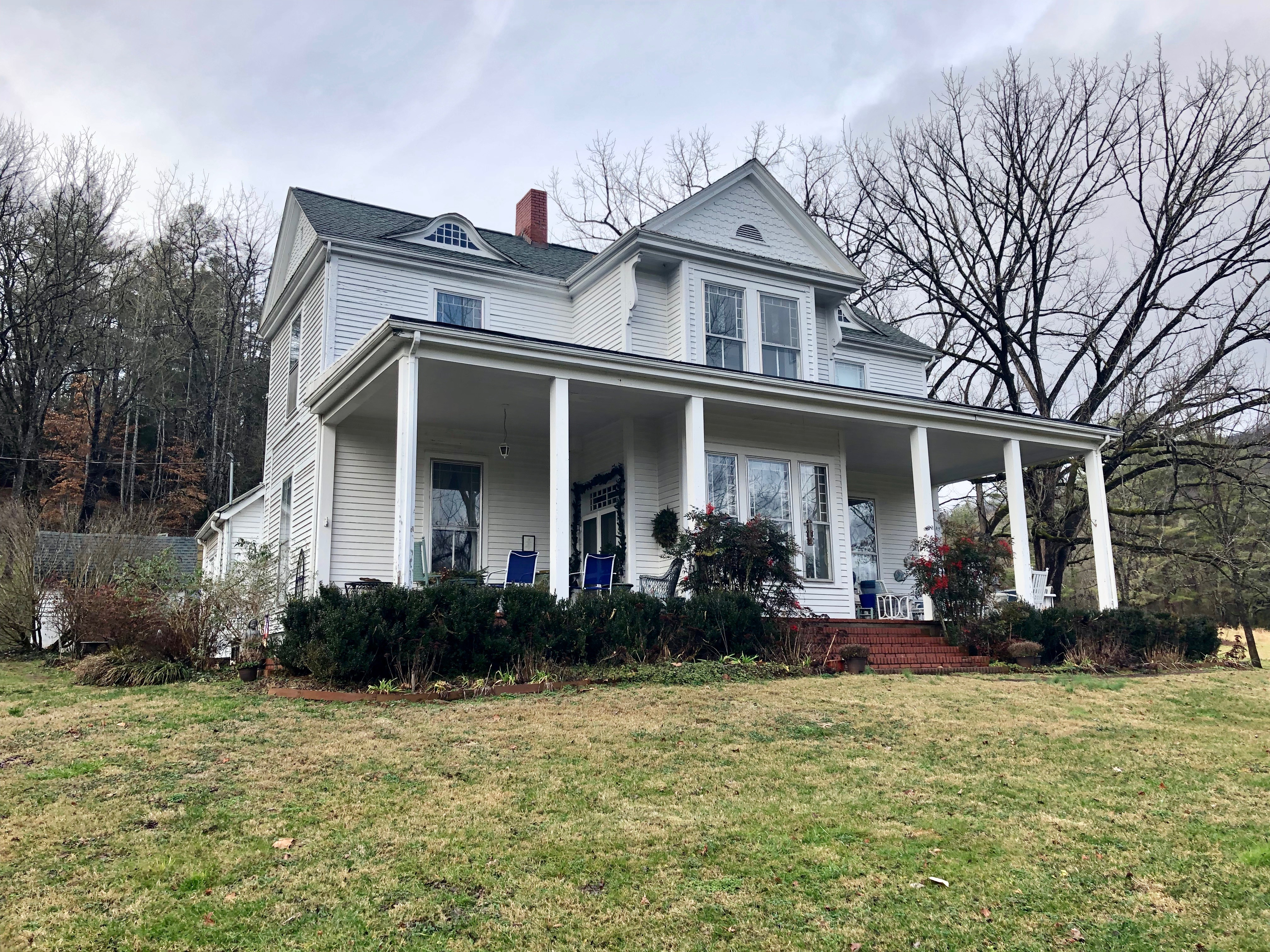
- East Elevation, Lucius Coleman Hall House

- Location within North Carolina Location within the United States
- Location: Off NC 116, 0.1 miles E of jct. with SR 1367, near Webster, North Carolina
- Coordinates: 35°20′40″N 83°13′43″W
- Area: 5 acres (2.0 ha)
- Built: 1891-1892
- Architectural style: Late Victorian, Vernacular Victorian
- NRHP reference No.: 90000365
- Added to NRHP: March 9, 1990

Lucius Coleman Hall House is a historic home located near Webster, Jackson County, North Carolina. The house was built in 1891–1892, and is a 2 1/2-story, Late Victorian-style frame dwelling, with a 1 1/2-story rear ell. The rear ell is believed to date to about 1850, and originated as a free-standing, saddlebag house with gable roof and central brick chimney. The 1892 section is a "T"-plan, I-house with elaborate details. The hipped roof porch on the 1892 section was added about 1950.

It was listed on the National Register of Historic Places in 1990.
