= Webster Rock School =

Historic school building in North Carolina, United States

- U.S. National Register of Historic Places
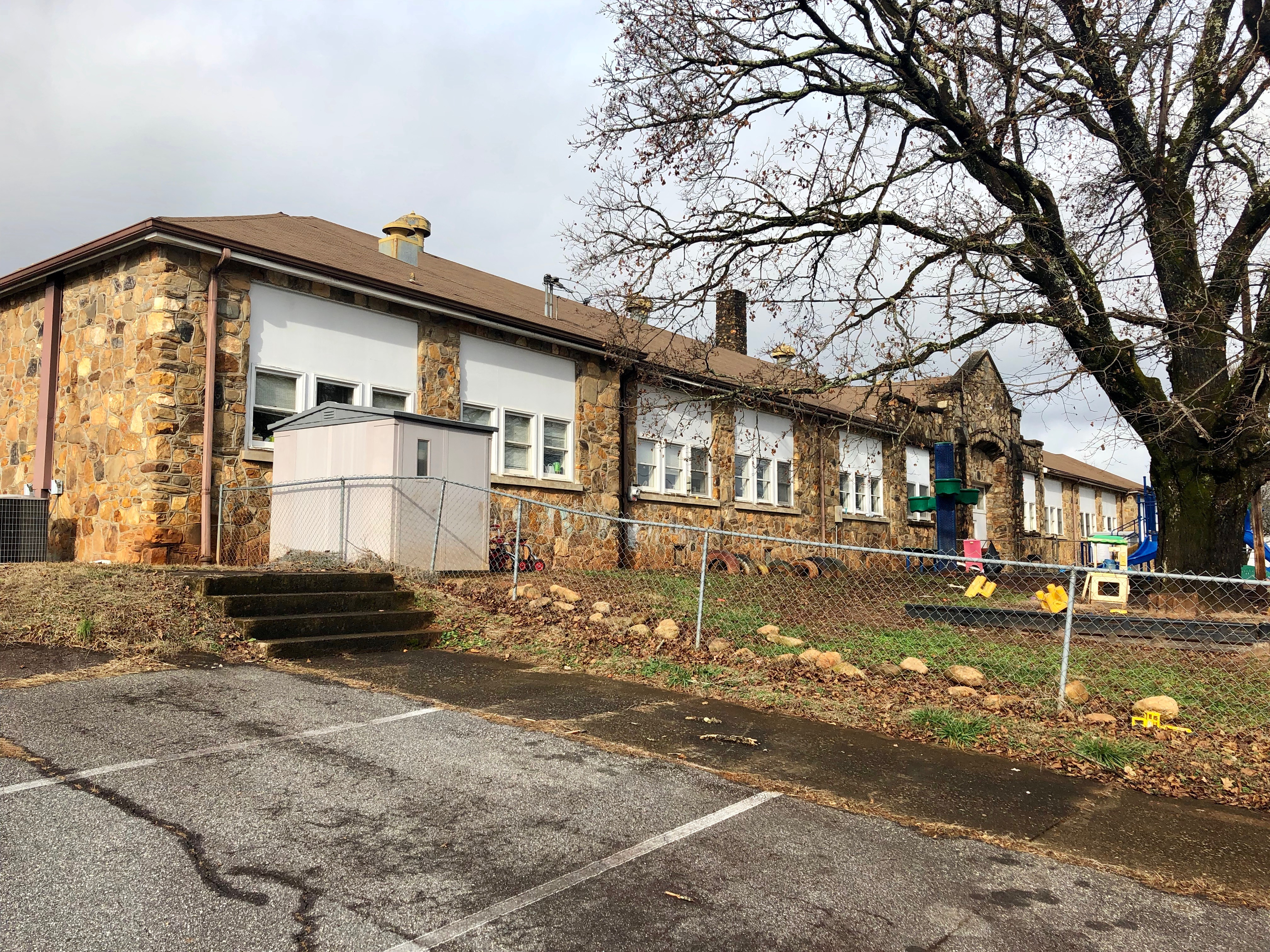
- Webster School in January, 2019

- Location within North Carolina Location within the United States
- Location: Main Street, Webster, North Carolina
- Coordinates: 35°20′43″N 83°13′23″W
- Area: 9 acres (3.6 ha)
- Built: 1936-1938
- Built by: WPA
- Architectural style: WPA Style
- NRHP reference No.: 89002262
- Added to NRHP: January 4, 1990

The Webster Rock School is an historic school building located NC 116 / Main St., at Webster, Jackson County, North Carolina. It was built between 1936 and 1938 by the Works Progress Administration, and is one story with hip roof utilitarian building, constructed of native "river rock" in colors of tan and brown. It has an "E"-shape plan and has a 13 bay front facade. The school originally contained an auditorium, cafeteria, kitchen and eight classrooms.

In 1990, it was added to the National Register of Historic Places.

== History ==
It once served as Webster High School and Webster Elementary School. The High School was active from 1936 until consolidation into Sylva-Webster High School (Now Smoky Mountain High School) in 1960. The Elementary School remained in operation until it was consolidated with Sylva Elementary School and Savannah Elementary School to form Fairview Elementary School in 1973.

== Current use ==
The old Webster Rock School is being used as the Southwestern Child Development Center, and by the Family Resources Center for Jackson County. The old Gymnasium is sometimes used for community events. The old windows and doors have been removed, replaced by white wooden panels and smaller windows, and most of the original ceilings are now obscured by a drop-in ceiling. The town's World War II memorial, dedicated to the memory of local residents who died during the war, is located on the front lawn of the building.

== See also ==
- List of Registered Historic Places in North Carolina
- National Register of Historic Places listings in Jackson County, North Carolina
- Smoky Mountain High School
- Jackson County Public Schools (North Carolina)
