= Cordelia Camp =

American educator and writer (1884–1973)

- Camp c. 1931
- Born: May 22, 1884; Rutherford County, North Carolina
- Died: July 10, 1973 (aged 89); Asheville, North Carolina
- Education: University of North Carolina at Chapel Hill; Columbia University
- Occupation: Educator

Cordelia Camp (May 22, 1884 – July 10, 1973) was an American educator. She was a prolific writer and was president of Delta Kappa Gamma in 1942. She was also the director of student teaching at Western Carolina College for twenty-three years. In 1965, Western Carolina College dedicated the Cordelia Camp Laboratory School to her.

== Early life ==
Cordelia Camp was born in Rutherford County, North Carolina on May 22, 1884, to Merrick Rickman and Letitia Morrow Camp. She was the oldest of five children. After she graduated school, she worked as a teacher for a few years before entering the University of North Carolina at Chapel Hill. She graduated from the university in 1920. She later got her master's degree from Columbia University in 1925.

== Career ==
Camp worked for twenty-three years as the director of student teaching at Western Carolina College before retiring from that job in 1950. After moving to Asheville in 1952, she taught at the local Plonk School for four years. She was one of the twelve people who founded the North Carolina branch of Delta Kappa Gamma. She was made their president in 1942, having previously been their first vice president.

She wrote biographies of the governors Zebulon Vance and David Swain for junior high students. Her biography of Swain was reviewed positively by the News and Record. In 1963, at the request of the Carolina Chapter Tercentenary Commission, Camp wrote a booklet titled The Influence of Geography upon the History of Early North Carolina. She also wrote most of the Delta Kappa Gamma publication Some Pioneer Women Teachers of North Carolina. In 1968, she wrote a book about the history of the Asheville Normal and Collegiate Institute, the school that she received her secondary and first professional training at, titled A Thought at Midnight.

== Personal life ==
Camp believed that it was important to save for big things like traveling instead of spending on little things. She traveled around the United States, and also traveled internationally to places such as Canada, Mexico, Europe, and the Caribbean. She also believed that teachers should not engage in political activities as teachers.

She died on July 10, 1973, after a brief illness.

== Legacy ==
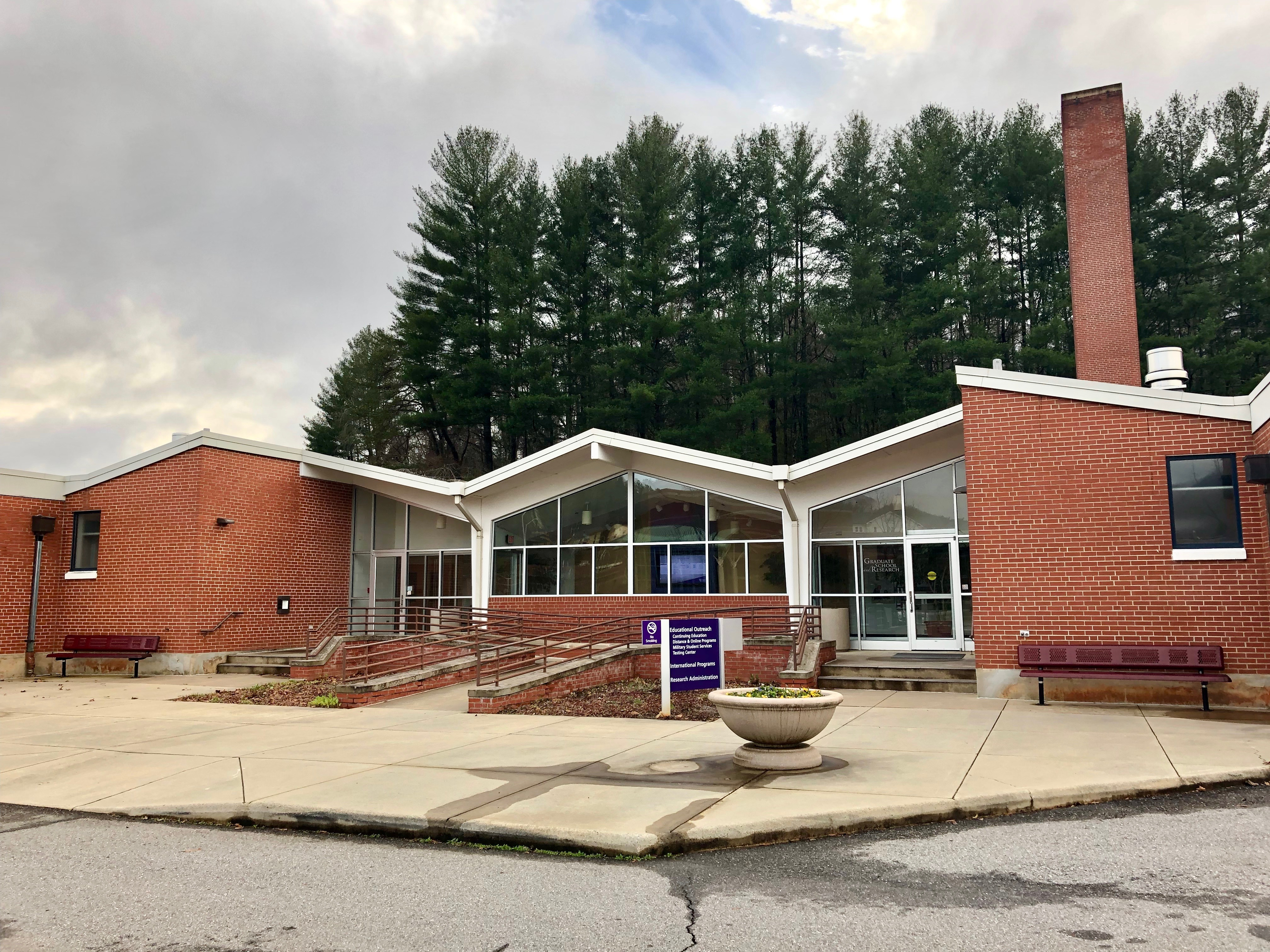
Cordelia Camp Laboratory School

Western Carolina College gave Camp an honorary Doctor of Education degree in 1956. The college also honored her in the naming and dedication of the Cordelia Camp Laboratory School in May 1965.

== Bibliography ==
- North Carolina by Problems: A Handbook for Teachers (1929)
- The Settlement of North Carolina (1942)
- Governor Vance: A Life for Young People (1961)
- David Lowry Swain: Governor and University President (1963)
- The Influence of Geography on Early North Carolina (1963)
- A Thought at Midnight: The Story of the Asheville Normal School (1968)
- A History of Piney Knob Baptist Church (1972)
- The Family of Merritt Rickman Camp
