= Charles Joseph Harris =

American industrialist (1853–1944)

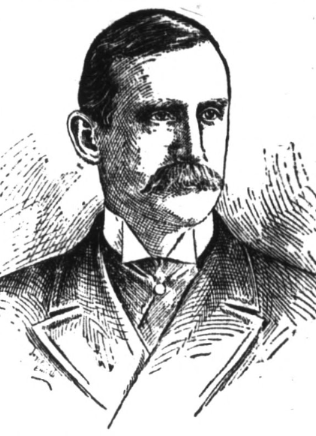
Charles Joseph Harris

Charles Joseph Harris (September 11, 1853 – February 14, 1944) was an industrialist who contributed heavily to the development of Jackson County and Western North Carolina from the late 19th century into the 20th century.

== Early life ==
Harris graduated from Yale College in 1874 and from Brown's School of Law in St. Louis in 1876. He was fraternity brothers with future U.S. president William Howard Taft at Yale. They stayed in contact until Taft's death.

== Marriage and move to Colorado ==
Harris moved to Denver, Colorado, where he met and wed Florence Rusk. They had three sons and one daughter, though two of the children died young from diphtheria.

== Return to North Carolina ==
In 1888, after his marriage to Florence concluded, Harris moved to Dillsboro, North Carolina, with his surviving sons, David Rust and Robert Ward, to live near his brother William Torrey Harris and nephew Theodore, who ran the Hog Rock clay mine. Harris lived in the former home of William Allen Dills, the founder of Dillsboro. As of 2019, Riverwood Shops are located in the building.

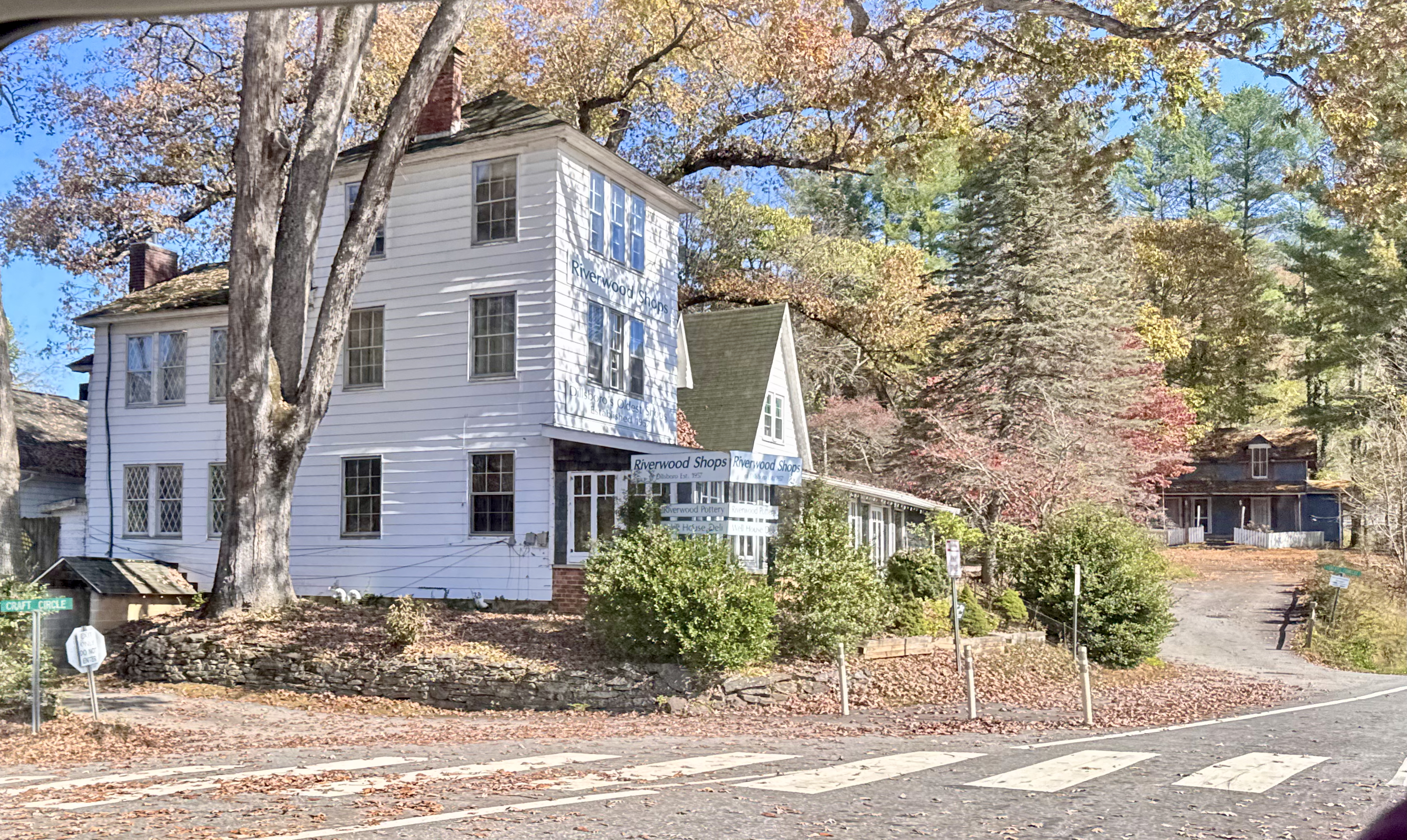
Harris lived in a home that once belonged to William Allen Dills. It is now the Riverwood Shops.

In 1889, Harris' brother William became United States Commissioner of Education and served in that role until 1906. Harris and his nephew purchased Hog Rock mine and renamed it Harris Clay Co. Harris established multiple mines in the area, shipping kaolin (used to produce porcelain) and clay to Trenton, New Jersey (a major manufacturing center) among other places. Harris later opened Beaver Creek Mine in Mitchell County, North Carolina, in 1910.

A post office called Harris operated from January 1896 until April 1911. Harris built Jackson County's first iron truss bridge in 1898, spanning the Tuckasegee River.

In 1898, he founded Sylva Supply Co. The company operated out of the prominent brick C.J. Harris Building on the corner of Main and Spring streets in the Downtown Sylva Historic District. The store closed in 1999 and the building was occupied by Sassafras Designs as of 2019. Harris established a tannery in 1901. As of 2019, Jackson Paper Co. operates on the site and it utilizes some of the original structures.

Harris attended every Republican national convention from 1892 until 1936. In 1908 he was elected delegate-at-large. He was the Republican nominee in the 1904 North Carolina gubernatorial election. He lost to Democrat Robert Broadnax Glenn.

Jackson County Bank, the county's first bank, was founded by Harris in Webster in 1905 and Harris served as its first president. The bank later moved to Sylva, survived the Great Depression, and in 1962 merged with First Union Bank. Harris was a major stockholder at Wachovia Bank in Asheville.

Harris started Jackson County's first electric company. He generated power from a small dam near the mouth of Scotts Creek and in 1909 built a new dam on Tuckasegee River. The Dillsboro and Sylva Electric Co. was incorporated that year. Harris served as president of the Asheville Daily Times Company and vice-president of the American National Bank in Asheville.

Harris was also the driving force to move the county seat from Webster to Sylva in 1913 and he built the Jackson County Courthouse that year. In the late 1920s, he was a backer of Sylva's first library. Harris contributed financially to the nascent Candler-Nichols Hospital and in 1929, four years after its founding, it was renamed C.J. Harris Community Hospital. Today Harris Regional Hospital retains his name. He also provided funds to build the memorial tower to Elisha Mitchell atop Mount Mitchell.

Harris had multiple lumber businesses and 76,000 acres of his timberland became part of the Great Smoky Mountains National Park. He was a strong opponent of the proposed park, arguing there was nothing of tourist interest on the land. Harris broke his hip in 1938 and was confined to bed until he died at his son Robert's home in Asheville on Valentine's Day in 1944. He is buried in Riverside Cemetery there.
