= Gertrude Dills McKee =

American politician

Member of the North Carolina Senate
- In office 1931–1943

Personal details
- Born: June 8, 1885 Dillsboro, North Carolina
- Died: November 27, 1948 (aged 63)
- Resting place: Keener Cemetery, Sylva, North Carolina
- Party: Democratic
- Spouse: Ernest Lyndon McKee
- Children: 2
- Education: Peace Institute
- Occupation: politician, clubwoman, schoolteacher

Gertrude Dills McKee (June 8, 1885 – November 27, 1948) was an American civic leader and politician from North Carolina. She was the first woman elected to the North Carolina State Senate.

== Life and career ==
McKee, known around Jackson County as "Gert" and "Miss Gert", was born and raised in Dillsboro, North Carolina, which had been founded by her father, William Allen Dills, on a portion of his own farmland. Dills was a prominent local businessman and politician who represented Jackson County in the North Carolina House of Representatives in 1889; his wife, Gertrude's mother, Alice Enloe Dills, was a member of a prominent western North Carolina family as well. McKee attended the local public school before continuing on to Peace Institute in Raleigh; there she became class president before graduating in 1905. While her specific course of study is not documented in available sources, Peace Institute at the time offered curriculum focused on liberal arts, teaching training, literature, and moral philosophy. After graduation she began work as a schoolteacher at the Dillsboro Graded School in her hometown. In 1913 she married a widower from nearby Sylva, Ernest Lyndon McKee, becoming stepmother to his son; she and her husband would have two further children, William Dills and Ernest Lyndon Jr. Her new husband was a businessman with various interests in and around Sylva. In 1923 the couple purchased the former summer estate of South Carolina Governor Wade Hampton III, turning it into a resort known as the High Hampton Inn.

As the wife of a prominent local businessman McKee soon became active in many local clubs and civic organizations. During World War I she led Liberty bond drives and organized local assistance to the Salvation Army. She served as president of the North Carolina Federation of Women's Clubs between 1925 and 1927, and from 1928 to 1930 led the state's chapter of the United Daughters of the Confederacy. In 1925 McKee managed to persuade Governor Angus McLean to sponsor a study about the conditions of women in industry, something which he had previously refused to do. This was cancelled the following year, but the governor appointed her to the North Carolina Educational Commission, on which she served an eight-month term. From 1926 to 1928 she led the Southern Council of Club Women; from 1927 to 1929 she served on the County Government Commission while presiding over the Southeastern Council of Federated Club Women. In 1931 she joined the Commission for Consolidation of The University of North Carolina, and from 1933 to 1935 she chaired the Board of Education in Jackson County. In 1928 she was a member of the circle of women who founded the first library in the town of Sylva. Throughout her public career she held various trusteeships, including at Western Carolina Teachers College, Peace College, the University of North Carolina, and Brevard College. She was also a member of the State Board of Public Welfare. McKee was also prominent in the Sylva Methodist Church, in whose choir she sang and at which she played the piano; she was also recognized locally for her skills as a homemaker.

=== North Carolina State Senate ===
McKee's political career began in 1928, when she campaigned for the election of Zebulon Weaver to the United States Congress. Two years later the local Democratic Party nominated her for the state senate. McKee was the second woman to run for state senate, after Loula Roberts Platt in 1922. She campaigned through the district's three counties before winning the largest majority of any candidate elected on the local ticket. She served three non-contiguous terms, from 1931 to 1943, being reelected in 1936 and 1942; she resigned on April 8, 1943, at the end of the year's session. She was reelected again in 1948, but died three weeks after the election without retaking her seat, from a sudden heart attack.

During her time in the Legislature McKee sat on numerous committees, including Appropriations; Education; Election Laws; Finance; Internal Improvements; Manufacturing, Labor, and Commerce; Institutions for the Deaf; Mental Institutions; Pensions and Soldiers' Home; Public Health; Conservation and Development; Library; and Printing. Her membership across these varied committees allowed her to impact legislation not only in welfare and education but also in infrastructure, health services, veterans’ affairs, and labor and commerce policy. She chaired the Public Welfare Committee each term, and the welfare programs which she supported in this role proved to be models for other states. She worked to reform child labor laws as well. She also fought for educational parity for all children in North Carolina, and secured, over opposition, passage of a bill requiring all pupils in the state's schools to complete sixth grade. She also championed reforms in child labor law, pressing the legislature to prohibit employment of children under 16 in dangerous or industrial work, and advocating for old‑age assistance programs while chairing the Public Welfare Committee. In 1933 she and state representative Thomas A. Cox obtained funding to pave the road between Sylva and Cullowhee. In jest McKee would sometimes refer to her male colleagues as "my children". So popular was she that there was speculation from some corners that she might become North Carolina's first female governor. She and her husband would often entertain legislators and other notables at the Inn. McKee was reelected in 1948, but died only a few days after the election.

McKee is buried in the Keener Cemetery in Sylva. Her descendants continue to operate the High Hampton Inn.

== Honors and legacy ==
McKee received an honorary doctorate from the Woman's College of The University of North Carolina. In recognition of the assistance she had provided the school over the years, Western Carolina University named McKee Hall on its campus in her honor; the building was constructed in 1939, and has more recently been renovated. A state historical marker in Sylva marks the location of her home, which was torn down in 1964 to make way for a Baptist church. Her portrait hangs in the Jackson County Library in Sylva alongside other local notables, United States Representative David McKee Hall – a great-nephew of the McKees – and former governor Dan K. Moore.

== See also ==
- Lillian Exum Clement, the first woman elected to the North Carolina House of Representatives, in 1920
- Loula Roberts Platt, the first woman to run for North Carolina State Senate, in 1922
