= William Allen Dills =

American businessman and politician

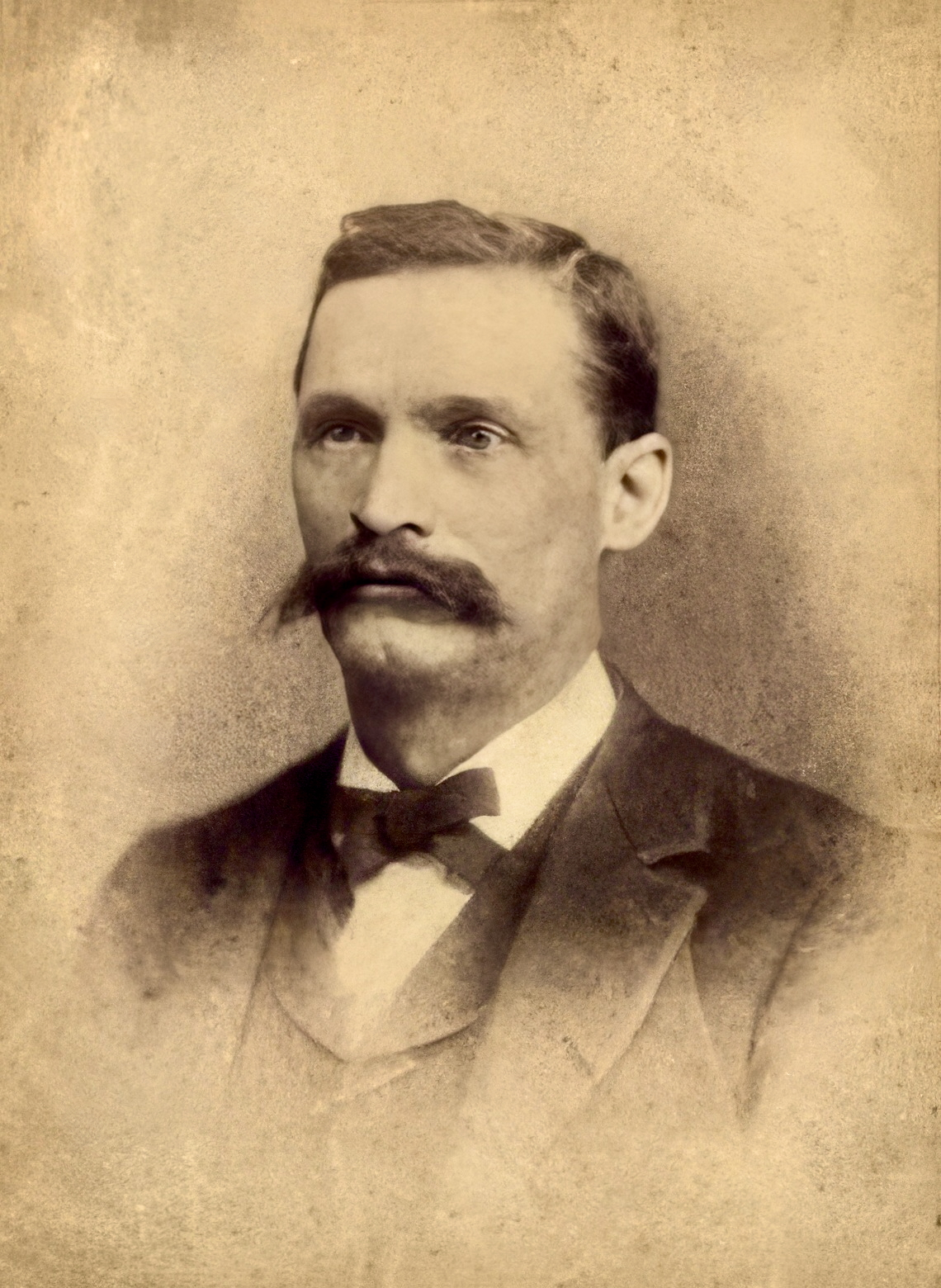
William Allen Dills

William Allen Dills was an American businessman and politician. He founded the town of Dillsboro, North Carolina, served as a member of the North Carolina House of Representatives, and was the father of Gertrude Dills McKee, the first woman elected to the North Carolina State Senate.

== Biography ==
Dills was born around 1842 about 2 miles (3.2 km) south of the town that holds his name. During the Civil War he was part of the Confederate Army. He was captured by Union troops and taken prisoner in Missouri. There he taught himself surveying and, upon his release, became a school teacher. In 1876, he returned to Jackson County and wed Alice Enloe. Alice gave him three daughters: Minnie Dills Gray (author of The History of Dillsboro); Gertrude; and Beulah Dills Weaver.

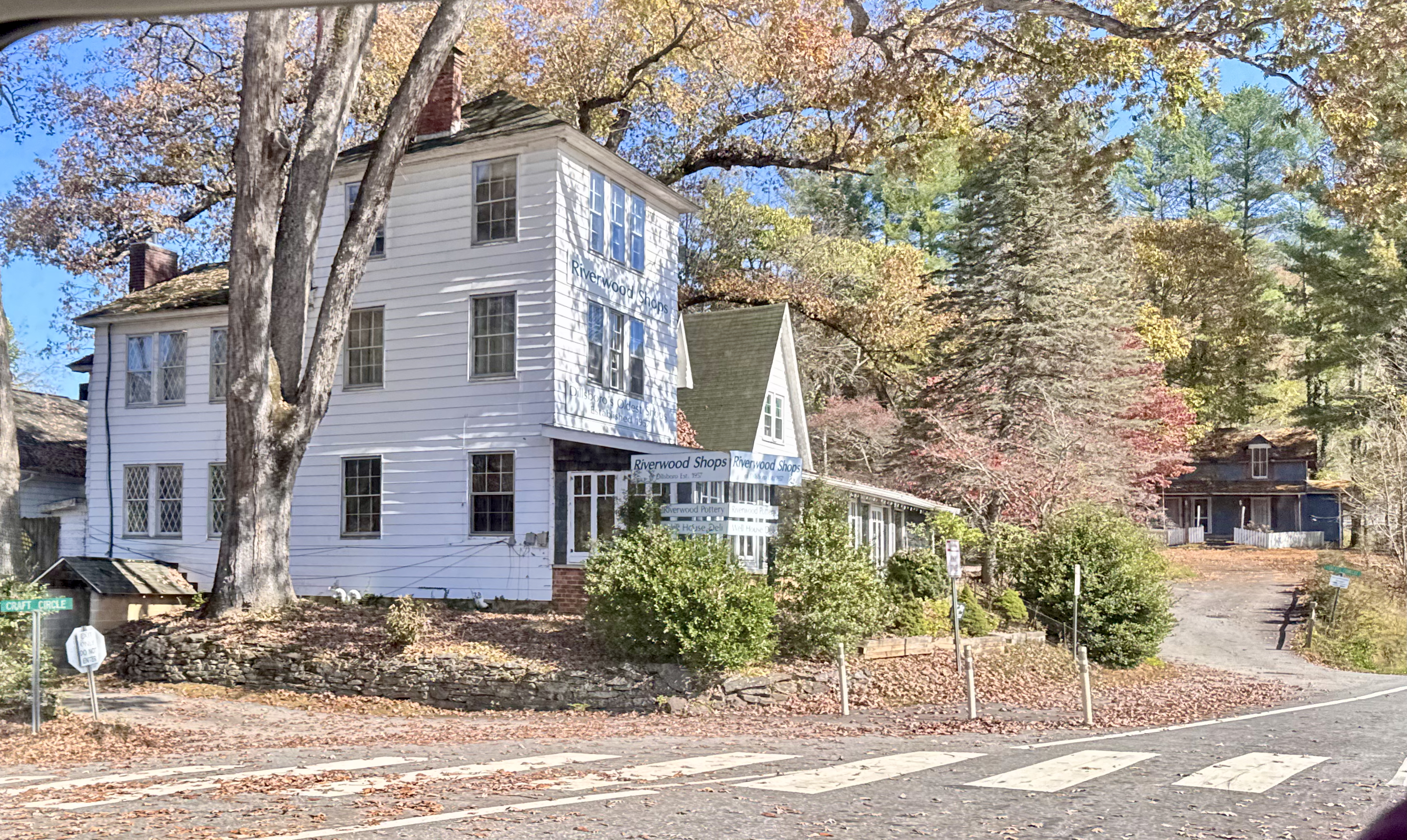
Dills built the first house in Dillsboro. Today the home is the Riverwood Shops.

In 1882, as the Murphy Branch railroad arrived, Dills built the first home in the area. His large house was on a hill overlooking Scott Creek and the Tuckasegee River. The area's first post office was located in that house and Dills was its first postmaster. Tunnel Post Office was named after the nearby Cowee Tunnel. The home was the only spot travelers could find a place to stay in the area. North Carolina governor Zebulon Vance lodged there at one time.

Dills owned most of the property that would become modern Dillsboro. He chose an area of his farm and set apart streets and lots. The unincorporated village was called Depot, New Webster, and Webster Station. Dills organized the community's first Sunday school in a depot waiting room until a church-academy could be completed on land he donated. That building later became the Masonic Lodge on Haywood Street. It was demolished around 1971.

Around 1884, Dills built the historic Jarrett House. It was founded as the Mount Beulah Hotel, named after his daughter. Dills later built a home next door. His earlier home on the hill was later occupied by industrialist Charles Joseph Harris and, by 2019, was the Riverwood Shops.

Dills' daughter Gertrude was born in his home on June 8, 1885. In 1889, Dills was elected to state office and served in the North Carolina House of Representatives. That same year he introduced a bill resulting in Dillsboro's town charter. Railroad executive Alexander Boyd Andrews suggested the town be named Dillsboro. With about 750 residents, Dillsboro was the largest non-county seat town in the state west of Asheville right before the turn of the century. Dills died around 1900 and was buried in Parris Cemetery.
