= Scott Creek (Jackson County, North Carolina) =

Stream in Jackson County, North Carolina, U.S.

Coordinates: 35°22′02″N 83°15′09″W

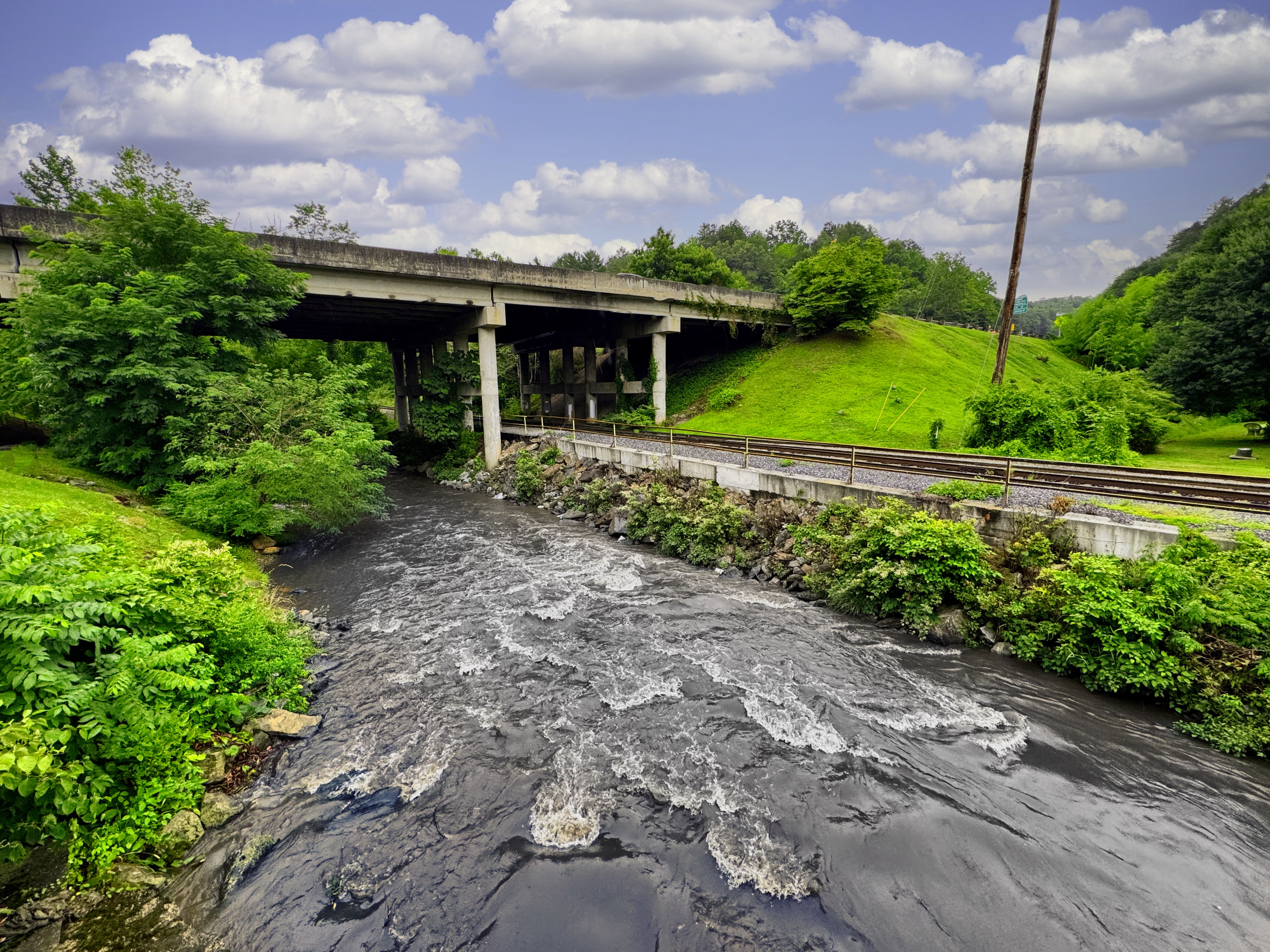
U.S. Route 441 crosses Scott Creek in downtown Dillsboro

Scott Creek is a stream in Jackson County, North Carolina, in the United States. The creek begins at Balsam Gap, parallels U.S. Route 74, winds through downtown Sylva, and is crossed by U.S. Route 441 before it feeds into the Tuckasegee River near downtown Dillsboro.

Scott Creek was probably named for an early settler. The creek is about 14.5 miles (23.3 km) in length. Its watershed has a drainage area of 59.1 square miles (153 km^{2}).

== See also ==
- List of rivers of North Carolina
