= Dr. D. D. Hooper House =

Historic house in North Carolina, United States

- U.S. National Register of Historic Places
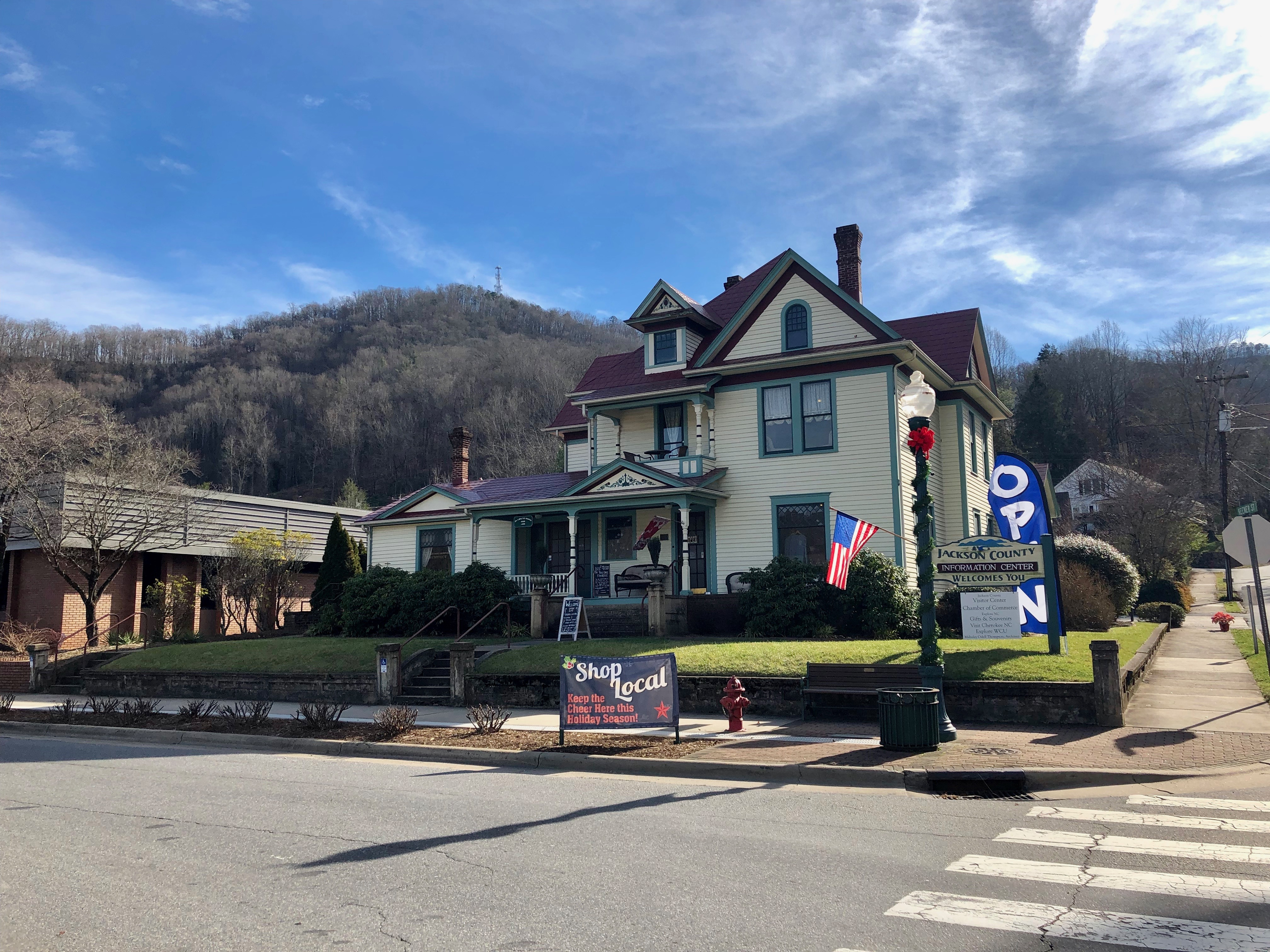
- Dr. D. D. Hooper House, January 2019

- Location within North Carolina Location within the United States
- Location: 773 W. Main St., Sylva, North Carolina
- Coordinates: 35°22′25″N 83°13′37″W
- Area: 0.3 acres (0.12 ha)
- Built: 1906
- Architect: Wells, Charles M.; Wells & Wilson
- Architectural style: Queen Anne
- NRHP reference No.: 00000395
- Added to NRHP: April 21, 2000

The Dr. D. D. Hooper House is a two-story Queen Anne style dwelling in downtown Sylva, Jackson County, North Carolina, built in 1906 for physician Delos Dexter Hooper and expanded in the 1930s to add a ground-floor medical office. The building stands at 773 West Main Street directly below the hill that the Jackson County Courthouse sits on. It is one of the few surviving early twentieth-century residential structures on Sylva's Main Street and one of only two Queen Anne houses in the downtown area. Today, the building houses the Jackson Chamber of Commerce.

It was listed on the National Register of Historic Places in 2000.

== Historical Context ==
When the house was built in 1906, Sylva was a rapidly expanding town competing with nearby Webster to be the seat of Jackson County. Growth accelerated after the Western North Carolina Railroad (later the Murphy Branch of Southern Railway) was routed through Sylva in the 1880s rather than Webster. By the early 1900s, Sylva had developed an industrial and institutional base that included the Sylva Collegiate Institute (opened 1900), the Harris Tannery (opened 1903), the Jackson County Bank (opened 1905), and the county newspaper and fair. These developments helped secure Sylva's designation as county seat in 1913 when the Jackson County Courthouse was erected on the hill next to the Hooper House.

A postcard from between 1914 and 1922 shows an unpaved Main Street with several residences leading up to the courthouse, including the Hooper House and another Queen Anne style house sometimes referred to as the “old Coward house”. Between 1933 and 1935, public works programs such as the Civil Works Administration (CWA) and the Emergency Relief Administration (ERA) rebuilt the concrete steps to the courthouse. Family recollections and other evidence suggest the concrete walkways and steps around the house were installed around the same time by the same workers.

Dr. Hooper lived in the house from its completion in 1906 until his death in 1973. Dr. Hooper passed to his three surviving children: Annie Jo Hooper Williams, Charles M. Hooper, and Kathleen Hooper Nash. In 1978, Annie Jo and Charles conveyed their interests to Nash. Nash sold the property in 1981 to a family who resided there until a mortgage foreclosure in 1985. Nash then repurchased the house at auction.

In 1986, Nash deeded the property to Jackson County, which used it as an annex to the Jackson County Library on the adjacent parcel. On December 2, 1999, the county voted to transfer the house to the Hooper House Preservation Foundation, Inc., a non-profit organization formed to rehabilitate the building for use as offices for the Jackson County Chamber of Commerce, the Jackson County Travel and Tourism Authority, the Jackson County Historical Society, and Sylva Partners In Renewal.

In 2000, it was listed on the National Register of Historic Places. Today, it houses the Jackson County Chamber of Commerce.

== Dr. Delos Dexter Hooper ==
Delos Dexter Hooper was born in Tuckasegee, North Carolina, on December 5, 1879. Dr. Hooper graduated from the University of Virginia Medical School in 1905 and began practicing medicine in Sylva the same year, initially working out of what became the Hooper Drug Store on Main Street.

Dr. Hooper practiced medicine in Sylva for approximately 68 years, serving as surgeon for Southern Railway and physician for Western Carolina University's athletic department, in addition to his private practice. Dr. Hooper was a member of the Rotary Club and a trustee at the First Baptist Church of Sylva.

Before his house was completed, Dr. Hooper lived at a Main Street hotel located on the site later occupied by Citizens Bank. According to local genealogical accounts, Thomas Edison came to Sylva seeking barium and lodged at the same hotel, where he and Dr. Hooper became friends and shared accommodations for about six months. During this time, Henry Ford drove an early version of the Model T to visit Edison, and Dr. Hooper joined them on a drive to Webster and back., an experience he reportedly remembered with great enthusiasm. Hooper later purchased what was described as the first “motor car” in Jackson County.

== Architecture and Design ==
=== Building Site ===
The house occupies the same quarter-acre parcel Dr. Hooper purchased from Belle Smith in 1906 with Main Street to the north, Keener Street to the west, adjoining property to the south, and what is now the Jackson County Library to the east. Originally, the lot included outbuildings to the south that were used for coal, lumber, a dairy, a garage, and likely a chicken coop.

While the north and west sides of the property retain their historic character, the east and south sides have been paved for the library's driveway and parking. Period maps and photographs indicate that early twentieth-century Main Street was lined with dwellings near the courthouse, but over time all but the Hooper House were removed as commercial and civic development grew.

=== Exterior ===
The house is a wood-frame, two-story Queen Anne style structure with a main hipped roof and asymmetrical lower cross gables, with one-story wings on the south (rear) and east sides. The house is clad in horizontal weatherboard siding on brick foundations, and features moderate decorative detailing such as turned porch posts, beaded-board soffits, vergeboards, and a distinctive vertical beaded-board frieze below the eaves.

A front porch spans the façade, containing separate entrances to the residence and the doctor's office. The porch is supported by turned wood posts with a balustrade of turned balusters that replaced more elaborate originals. Above the porch is a small balcony framed by turned columns and pilasters with a shed roof and decorative rake boards.

=== Interior ===
The interior is organized around a central hall with a master bedroom, living room, kitchen, dining room, bathroom, and parlor. Most interior walls are largely papered over, with original finishes surviving beneath later coverings.

In 1911, when the Dillsboro and Sylva Electric and Light Company introduced electricity to Sylva, the house was among the first three residences in town to be wired, and some of its surviving light fixtures date to this period.

By the 1920s, the opening in the living room fireplace was converted to serve as a flue for a coal-burning stove, with floor grates installed to distribute heat upstairs. Other changes were made in the 1920s to add plumbing fixtures, including a claw-foot tub, porcelain-enameled sinks, and a remodel of the master bathroom. An upstairs bathroom was also added.

In the 1930s, part of the front porch was replaced with a doctor's office, waiting room, and storage room. Overall, the floor plan of the house is believed to remain essentially the same as its original configuration apart from bathrooms and the office addition.
