= Harris Regional Hospital =

- Duke LifePoint
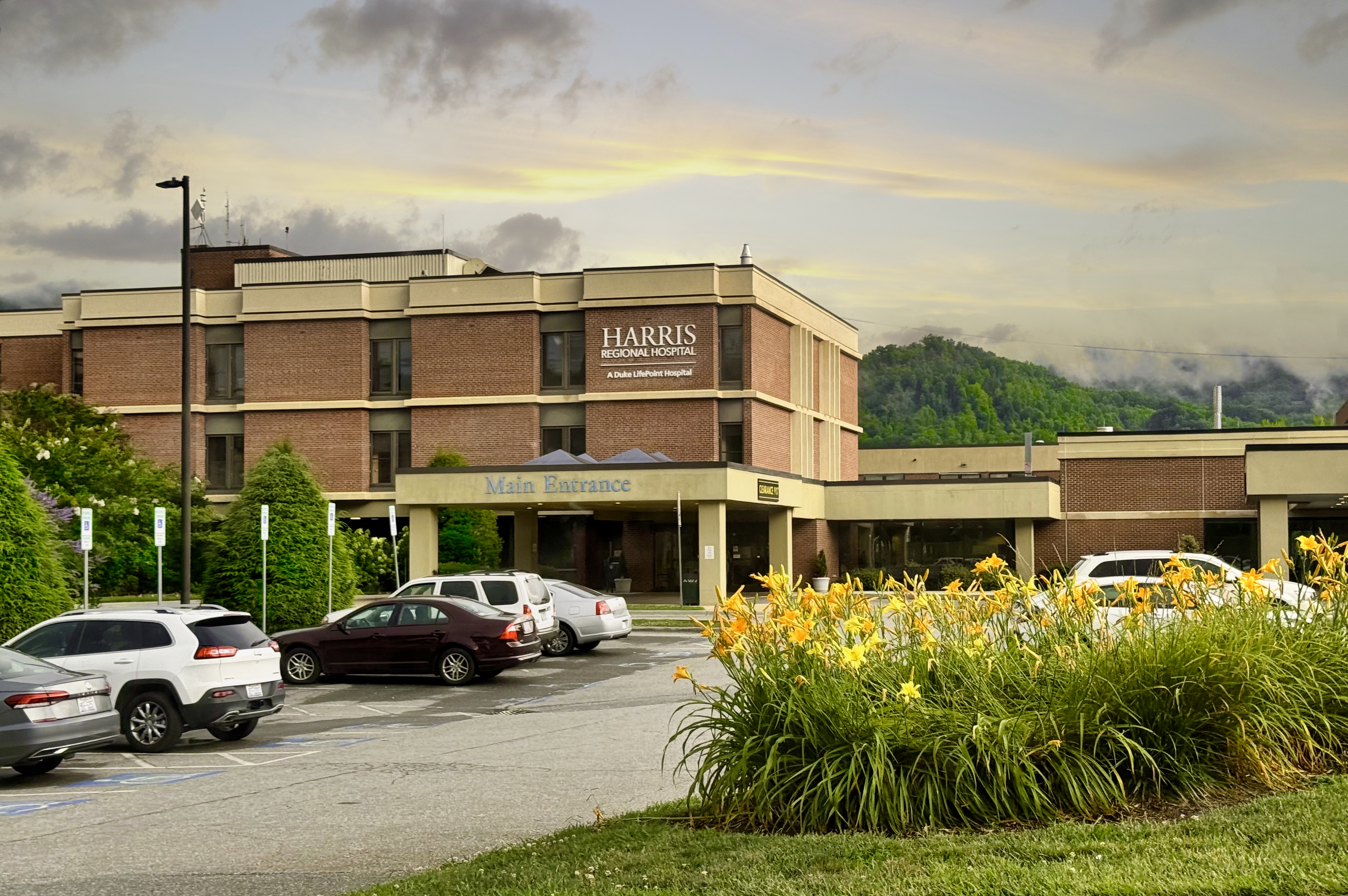

Geography
- Location: Sylva, Jackson County, North Carolina, United States
- Coordinates: 35°23′10″N 83°12′10″W

Services
- Emergency department: Yes
- Beds: 86

Helipads
- Helipad: Yes

History
- Constructed: 1959
- Founded: 1925

Links
- Website: https://www.myharrisregional.com/
- Lists: Hospitals in North Carolina

Harris Regional Hospital is a hospital located in Sylva, North Carolina. The hospital is licensed for 86 beds. It serves Jackson, Swain, Macon and Graham counties in western North Carolina and is affiliated with Duke LifePoint.

== History ==
In 1925, two local doctors, Harold Tidmarsh and C.Z. Candler, started Candler-Tidmarsh Hospital on Courthouse Hill overlooking downtown Sylva. In 1928 the name changed to “Candler-Nichols Hospital” after Dr. Alvin Nichols bought Tidmarsh’s interest.

In 1929, the Duke Foundation provided funding for the enterprise and it was renamed to C.J. Harris Community Hospital in honor of Charles Joseph Harris’ financial support. Harris was a local businessman who owned kaolin and clay mines, built the historic Jackson County Courthouse, and established Sylva's first library.

In May 1949, the hospital expanded with the completion of the $37,000 T.N. Massie wing. A fire destroyed one of the hospital's main wings in April 1958, forcing the entire facility to close for more than a month.

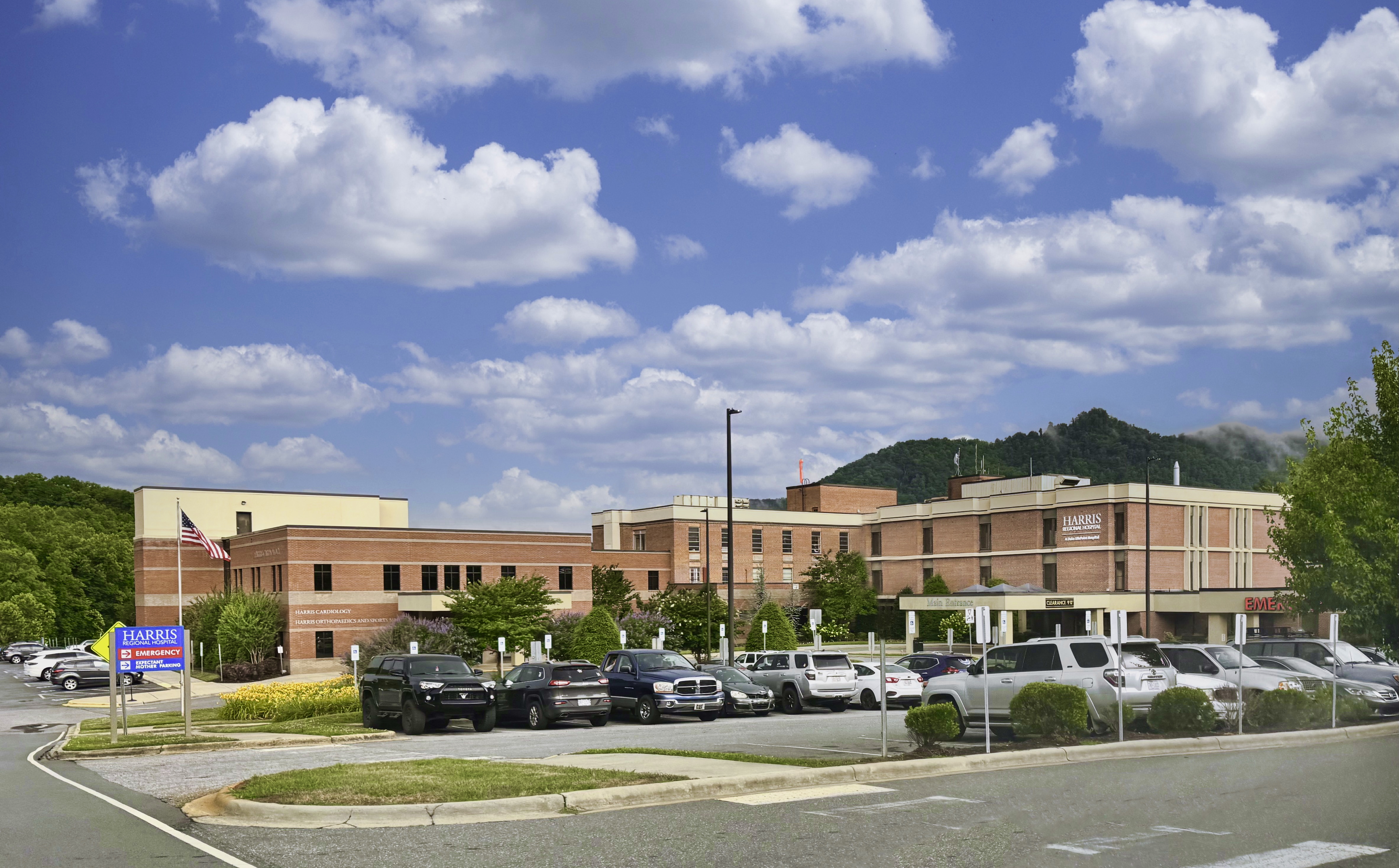
The hospital moved to its current location in 1959.

A new 50-bed medical center opened at the hospital's current location in November 1959. A three-story addition and two one-story additions were completed in 1971, bringing the total number of beds to 80. A 1984 expansion added 55,000 square feet at the cost of $9 million. The hospital expanded again in 1994 to offer a total of 86 beds. As more than half of patients began coming from outside Jackson County, the hospital board changed the name to "Harris Regional Hospital."

Harrison Ford filmed scenes for the film The Fugitive at the hospital in spring 1993. In 1997, HRH partnered with the 48-bed Swain Community Hospital in Bryson City (founded 1948). HRH also operates the outpatient Medical Park of Franklin in Macon County. The company has a total of 100 physicians on staff. On August 9, 2023, Ashley Hindman became CEO.
