= 1904 North Carolina gubernatorial election =

- November 8, 1904
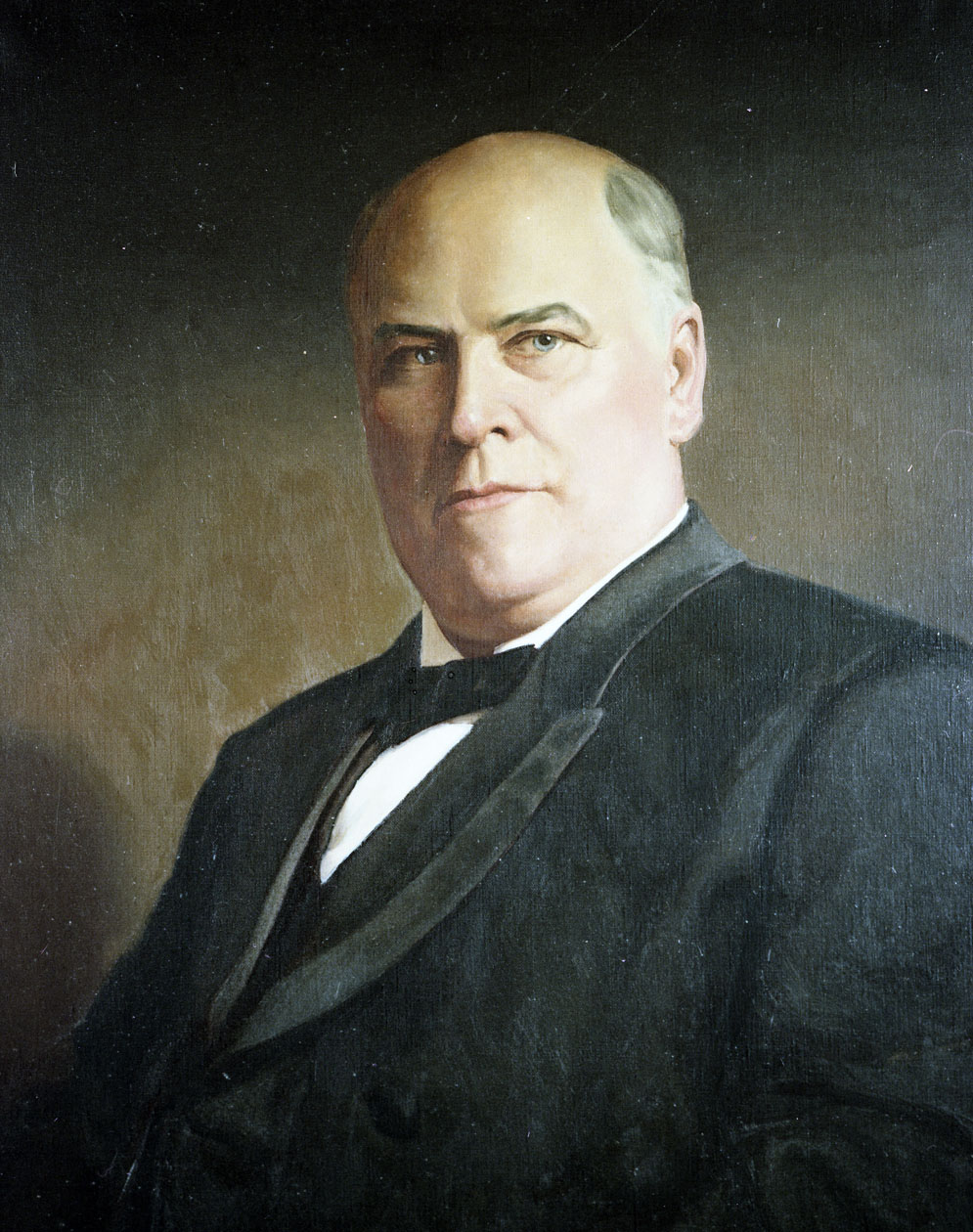

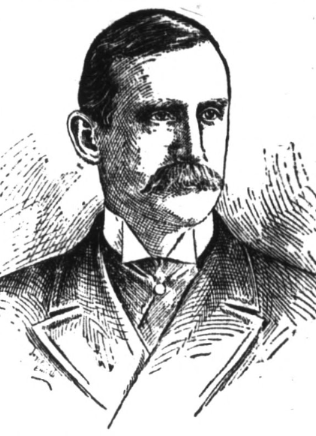
Nominee	Robert Broadnax Glenn	Charles Joseph Harris
Party	Democratic	Republican
Popular vote	128,761	79,505
Percentage	61.72%	38.11%
- County results Glenn: 50–60% 60–70% 70–80% 80–90% 90–100% Harris: 50–60% 60–70% 70–80%
Governor before election
Charles Brantley Aycock
Democratic
Elected Governor
Robert Broadnax Glenn
Democratic

The 1904 North Carolina gubernatorial election was held on November 8, 1904. Democratic nominee Robert Broadnax Glenn defeated Republican nominee Charles Joseph Harris with 61.72% of the vote. At the time, Glenn was an attorney and former member of the state Senate, while Harris was a businessman and former member of the United States Industrial Commission.

== Democratic convention ==
The Democratic convention was held on June 27, 1904.

=== Candidates ===
- Robert Broadnax Glenn, State Senator
- Charles Manly Stedman, former Lieutenant Governor
- Theodore F. Davidson, former North Carolina Attorney General
- Wilfred D. Turner, incumbent Lieutenant Governor

=== Results ===
Democratic convention results
Party	Candidate	Votes	%
Democratic	Robert Broadnax Glenn	653	46.98
Democratic	Charles Manly Stedman	458	32.95
Democratic	Theodore F. Davidson	158	11.37
Democratic	Wilfred D. Turner	121	8.71
Total votes		1,390	100.00

== General election ==
=== Candidates ===
Major party candidates

- Robert Broadnax Glenn, Democratic
- Charles J. Harris, Republican

Other candidates

- James M. Templeton, Prohibition
- William A. Pegram, Socialist

=== Results ===
1904 North Carolina gubernatorial election
Party	Candidate	Votes	%	±%
Democratic	Robert Broadnax Glenn	128,761	61.72%	
Republican	Charles J. Harris	79,505	38.11%	
Prohibition	James M. Templeton	235	0.11%	
Socialist	William A. Pegram	109	0.05%	
Majority		49,256		
Turnout				
Democratic hold		Swing		
