= The Jarrett House =

- Mount Beulah Hotel
- U.S. National Register of Historic Places
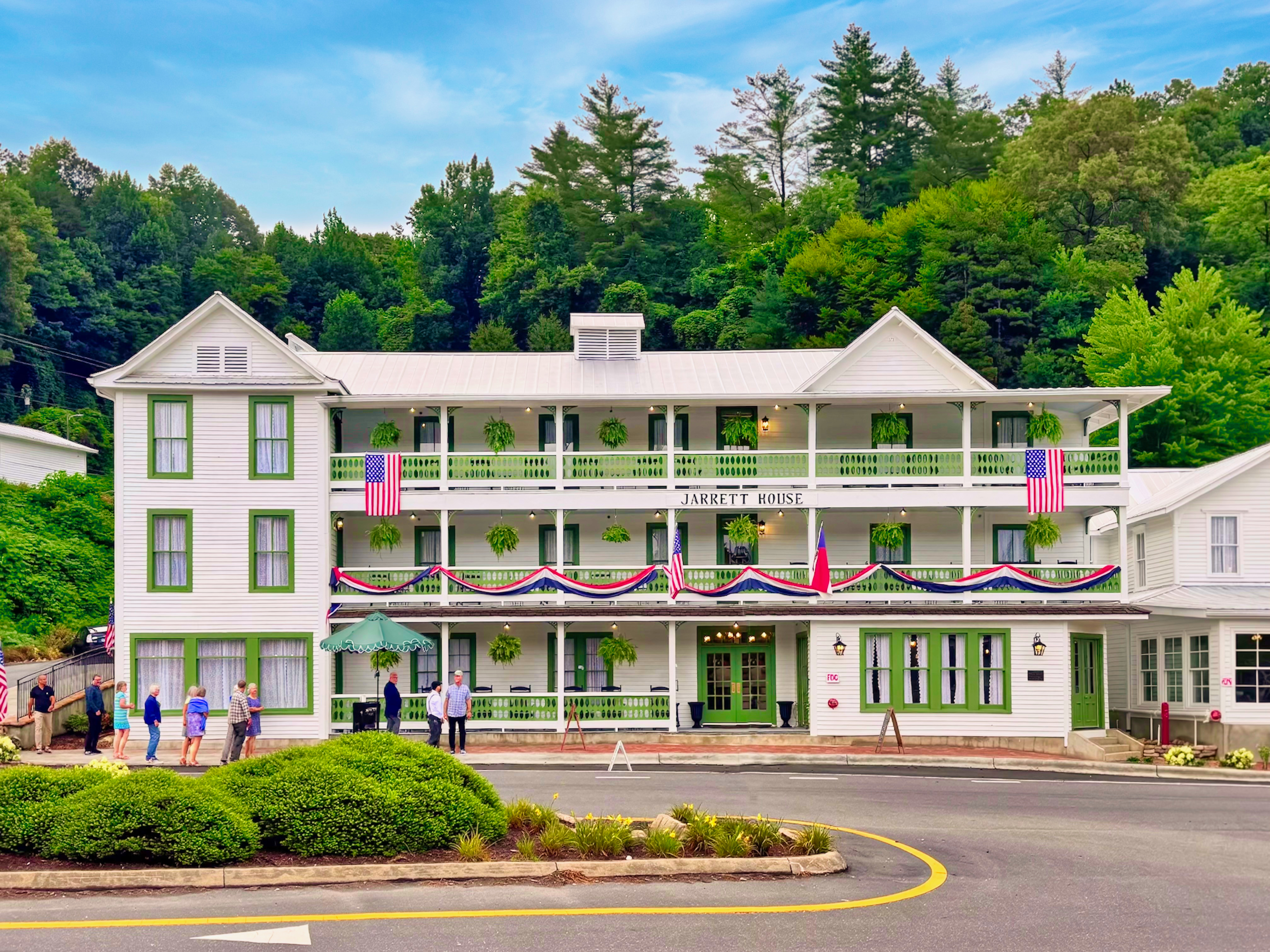
- The Jarrett House, 2026

- Location within North Carolina Location within the United States
- Location: US 23 and 441, Dillsboro, North Carolina
- Coordinates: 35°22′11″N 83°15′6″W
- Area: 0.5 acres (0.20 ha)
- Built: 1884, c. 1910
- NRHP reference No.: 84002337
- Added to NRHP: March 1, 1984

The Jarrett House is a historic hotel and restaurant located near the intersection of US Highways 23 and 441 in Dillsboro, Jackson County, North Carolina.

The three-story frame hotel with a triple-tiered porch is the dominant building of downtown Dillsboro. It combines traditional and modest Victorian decorative elements. It is one of the few remaining grand Southern Railway (U.S.) Resort Hotels.

== History ==
The building was constructed around 1884 by William Allen Dills, the founder of the town of Dillsboro and a former North Carolina state representative. It was the first major hotel in the area and predates the incorporation of the town. Dills named it the Mount Beulah Hotel after his youngest daughter. Dills later built his permanent home next to the hotel.

The 23-room hotel has had a number of additions and modifications since its construction. In 1894, Dills sold the business to R. Frank Jarrett and his sons. Due to a sulphur spring bubbling into a soapstone basin behind the hotel, they renamed it Jarrett Springs Hotel. Around 1910, the hotel was moderately expanded. A wing was added on the west end and the east end of the first floor front porch was enclosed.

When Frank Jarrett died in 1949, the hotel was sold to W. W. Faw. Faw renamed the business "The Jarrett House." The property changed owners several times between 1956 and 1961. Janet and Percival Lowe bought the hotel in 1961. They sold it to James and Barbara Jean Hartbarger in 1975. The building was renovated in 1975, removing the original wooden Victorian porch and replacing it with a cast iron New Orleans-Style Porch.

In 1984, The Jarrett House was added to the National Register of Historic Places.

The buildings and lot were auctioned for back taxes, selling for $120,000 on October 26, 2020. It was again sold at auction in January 2021 to Chris Ellsworth for $300,000. The building reopened in summer 2026 after five years of renovations.

== See also ==
- National Register of Historic Places listings in Jackson County, North Carolina

== Gallery ==
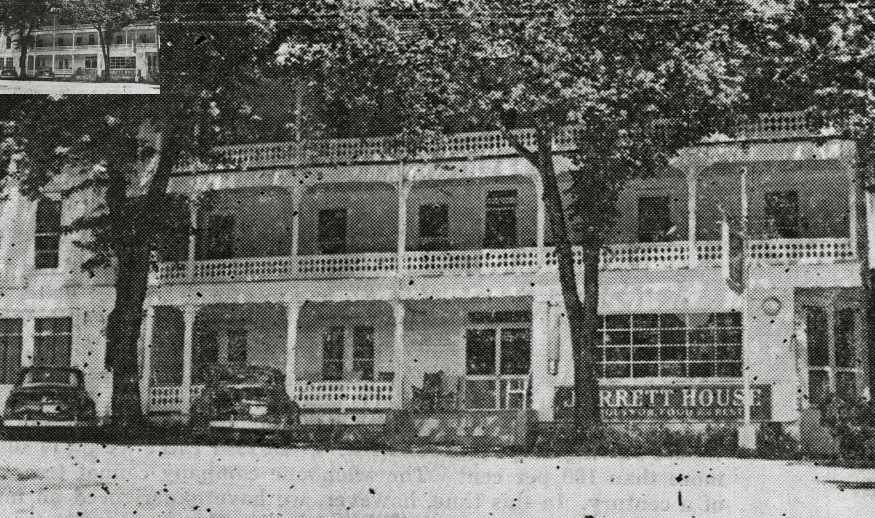
Jarrett House as it appeared from the 1930s up until the 1970s

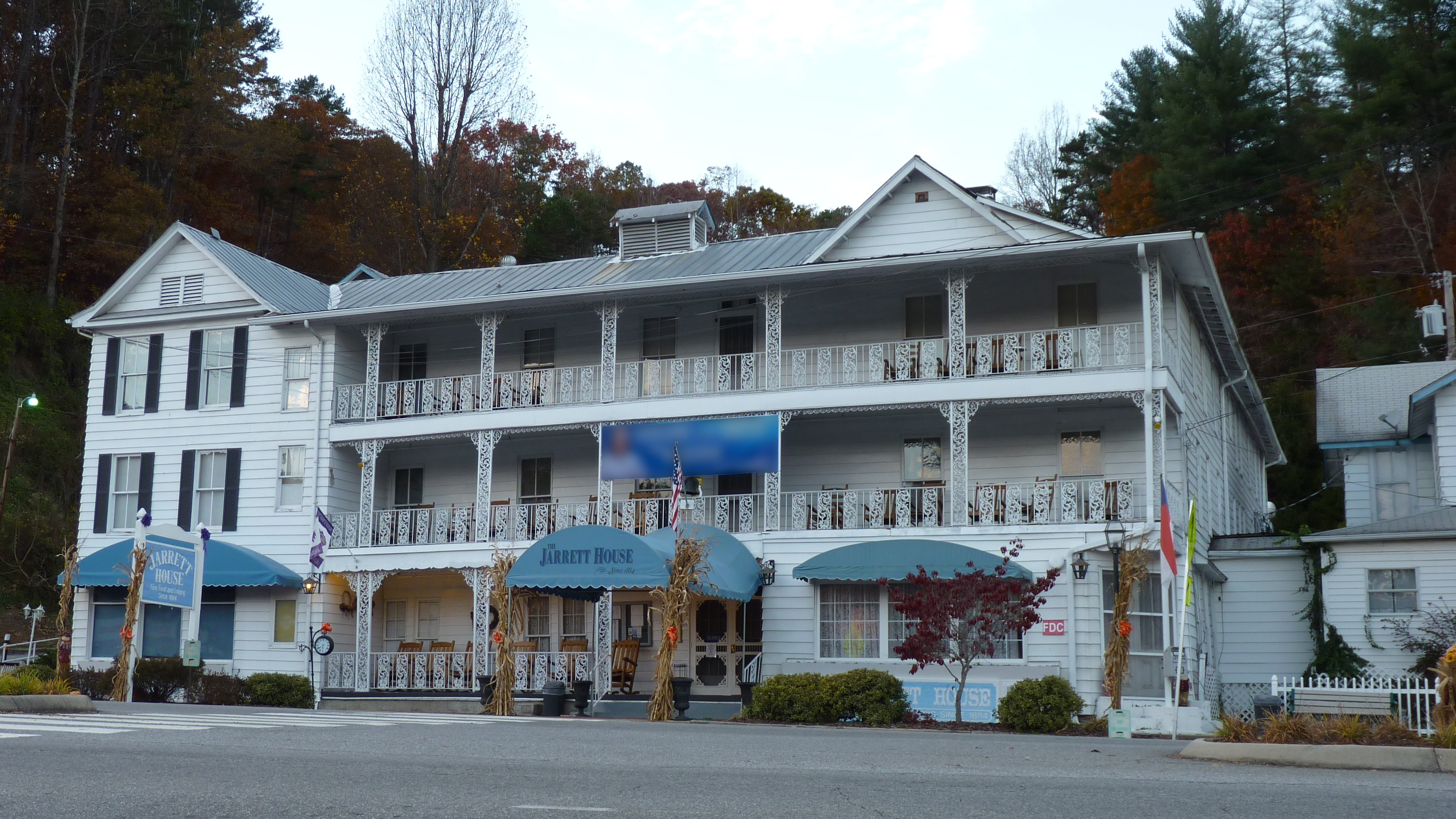
November 2013

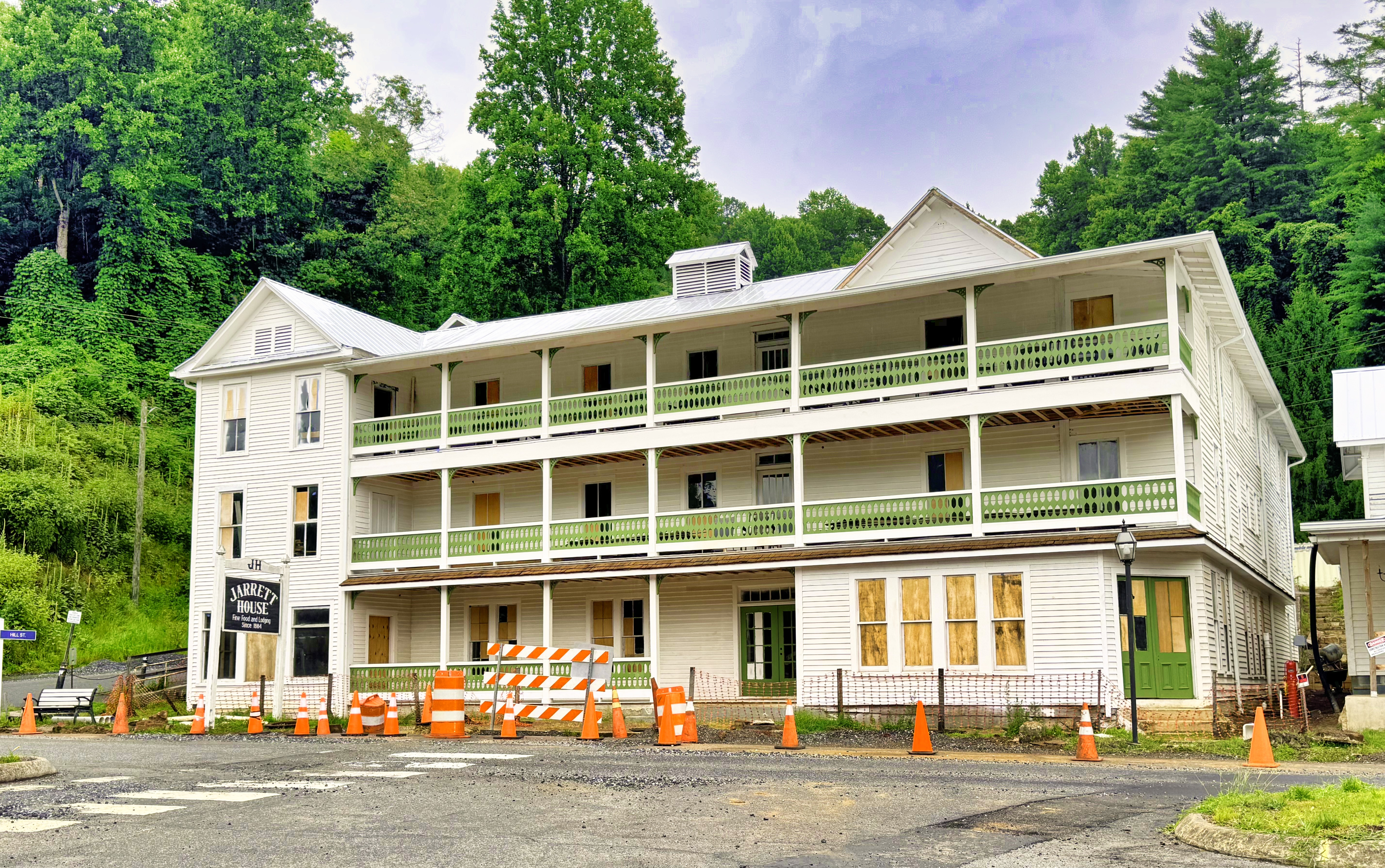
Under renovation in 2024
