= Elias Brendle Monteith House and Outbuildings =

Historic house in North Carolina, United States

- U.S. National Register of Historic Places
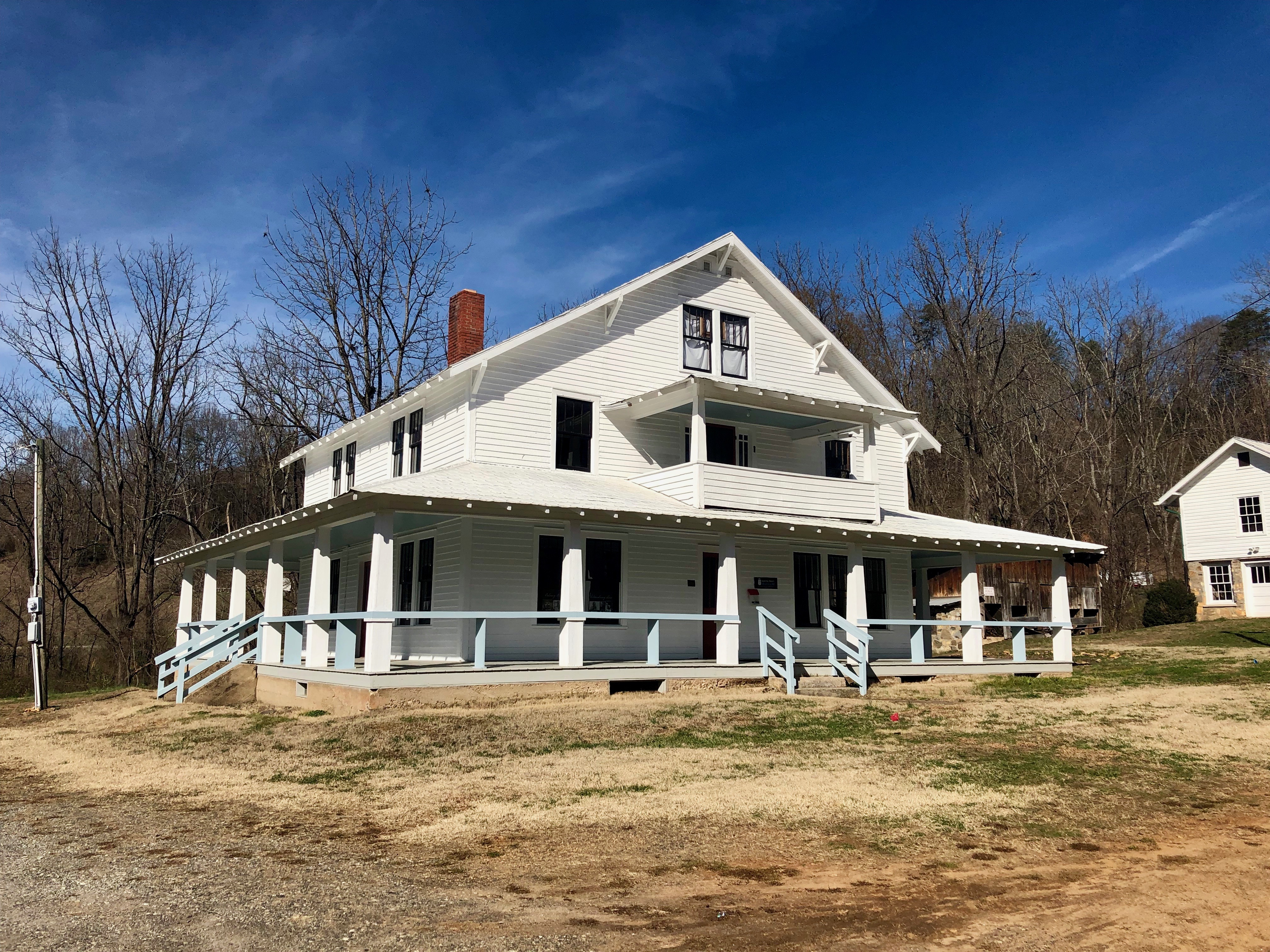
- The Newly Repainted Monteith Farmhouse, January 2019

- Location within North Carolina Location within the United States
- Location: 111 Hometown Place Rd., Dillsboro, North Carolina
- Coordinates: 35°22′22″N 83°14′41″W
- Area: 16.3 acres (6.6 ha)
- Built: c. 1908
- Architectural style: Bungalow/craftsman
- NRHP reference No.: 08000778
- Added to NRHP: August 13, 2008

Elias Brendle Monteith House and Outbuildings is a historic home and farmstead located at Dillsboro, Jackson County, North Carolina. The house was built about 1908, and is a 2 1/2-story, front-gable-roof American Craftsman-style frame house with exposed rafter ends and knee braces. It features an eight-foot-deep porch on four sides. Also on the property are a number of contributing outbuildings including a greenhouse, two outhouses, a storage shed, a slaughterhouse, barn, a spring house, and a washhouse and cannery.

It was listed on the National Register of Historic Places in 2008.
