= The Sylva Herald and Ruralite =

- Type: Weekly newspaper
- Format: Broadsheet
- Owner: James A. Gray
- Publisher: Stephen B. Gray
- Editor: Qintin Ellison
- Founded: 1926
- Language: English
- Headquarters: 539 W. Main Street; Sylva, North Carolina; United States
- OCLC number: 26252929
- Website: thesylvaherald.com

The Sylva Herald and Ruralite is a weekly newspaper based in Sylva, North Carolina covering Sylva and Jackson counties. Founded in 1926, the paper is primarily focused on news and information of local interest with limited space devoted to state and national/world news.
