= Dillsboro, North Carolina =

- Town
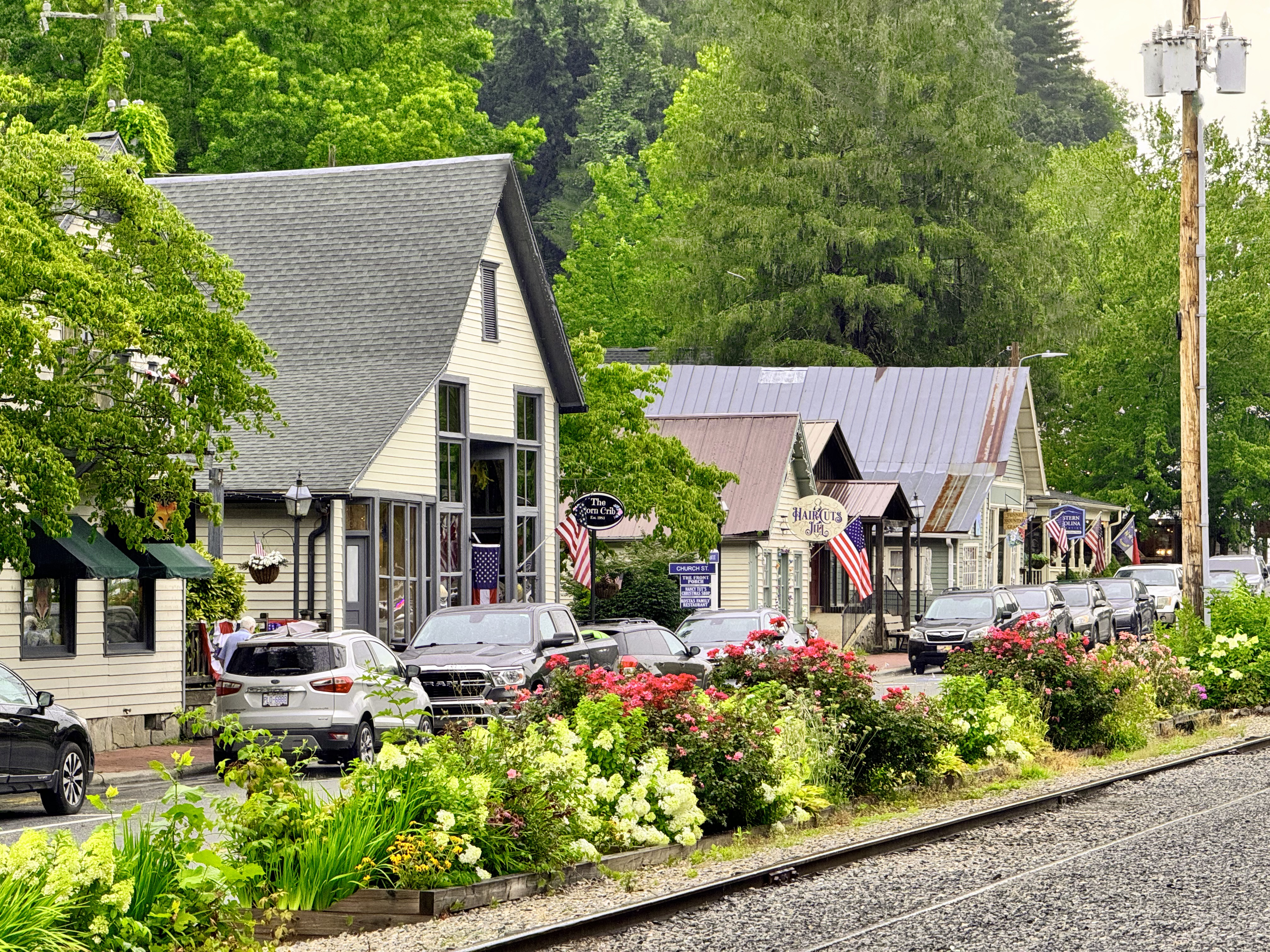
- Front Street in Dillsboro

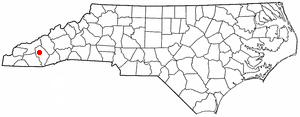
- Location in North Carolina
- Coordinates: 35°22′14″N 83°15′09″W
- Country: United States
- State: North Carolina
- County: Jackson
- Settled: 1882
- Incorporated: 1889

Government
  - Mayor: Mike Fitzgerald

Area
  - Total: 0.48 sq mi (1.24 km^{2})
  - Land: 0.48 sq mi (1.24 km^{2})
  - Water: 0 sq mi (0.00 km^{2})
- Elevation: 2,060 ft (630 m)

Population (2020)
  - Total: 213
  - Density: 450/sq mi (172/km^{2})
- Time zone: UTC-5 (EST)
  - Summer (DST): UTC-4 (EDT)
- ZIP code: 28725, 28779
- Area code: 828
- FIPS code: 37-17180
- GNIS feature ID: 2406379
- Website: www.dillsboronc.info

Dillsboro is a town in Jackson County, North Carolina, United States. The population was 213 at the 2020 census down from 232 at the 2010 census.

== History ==
Dillsboro was founded when the Murphy Branch Railroad came to the area in the 1880s. In 1882, the first post office in the area opened. Called the Tunnel Post Office, it was named after the nearby Cowee Tunnel. In 1882, the postmaster, William Allen Dills, built a large home on a hill overlooking the Tuckasegee River, later the home of Charles Joseph Harris and now The Riverwood Shops. The unincorporated village was called Depot, New Webster, and Webster Station until the state legislature had its name officially changed to Dillsboro when the village was incorporated as a town in 1889 to honor William Allen Dills, the town's founder (another source names George W. Dill, an early settler.) Railroad executive Alexander Boyd Andrews suggested the town be named Dillsboro.

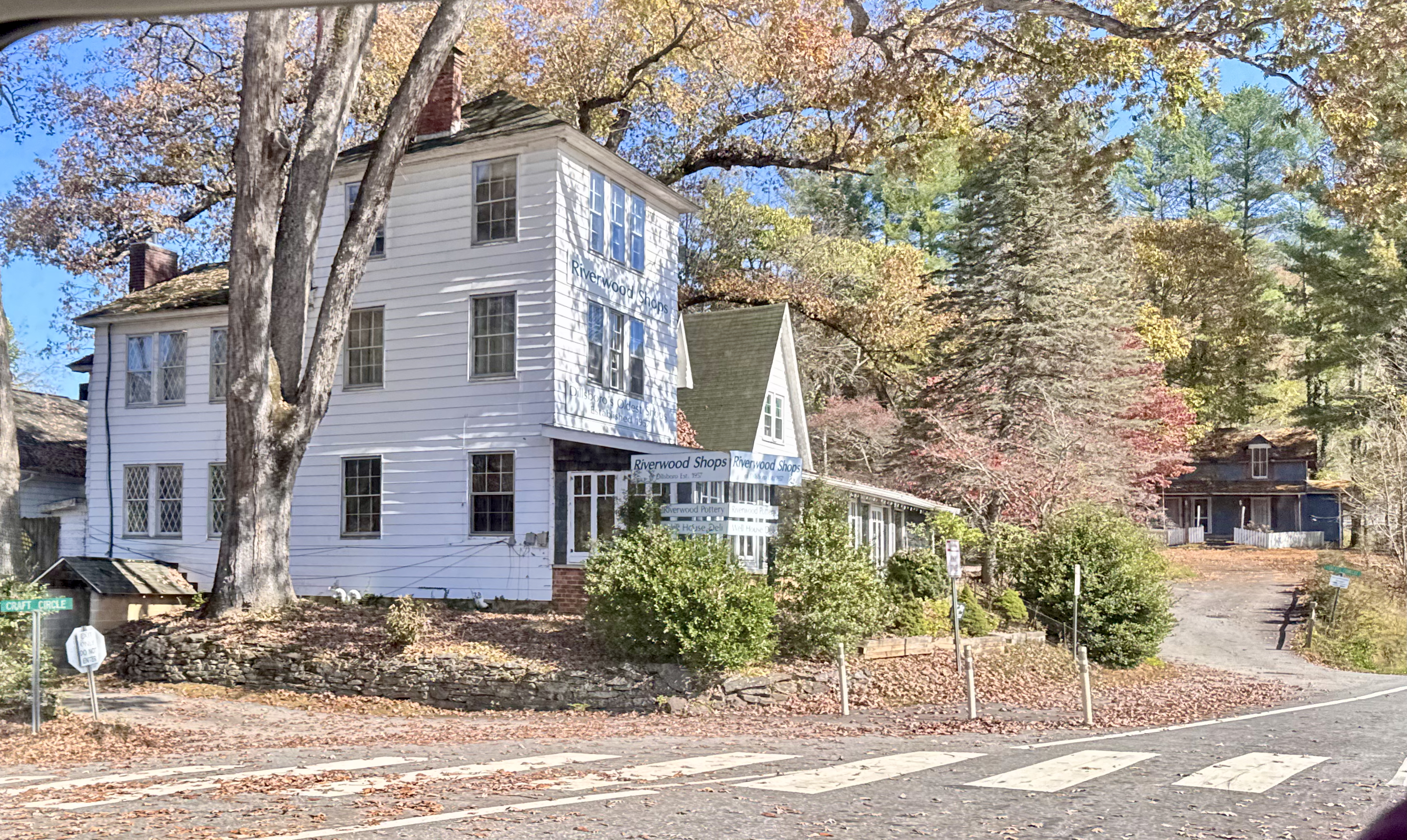
The first house in Dillsboro was home to William Dills and C.J. Harris. Today it is Riverwood Shops.

One of the oldest buildings in the town dates to the 1870s, before the town was officially founded. As of 2024, it serves as a barber shop. The building is one floor and was built on Front Street when the town was largely farmland. Around 1884, the historic Jarrett House hotel was constructed by Dills. In a relatively short time period, Dillsboro became a thriving town; by 1888, it was the most important town on the Murphy Branch of the Southern Railway in the areas of Industry, with two sawmills, two clay mines, a locust pin company, a corundum crushing plant, a chestnut pole yard, a chestnut corkwood yard, two livery stables, six general stores, a large hotel, and a shoemaker.

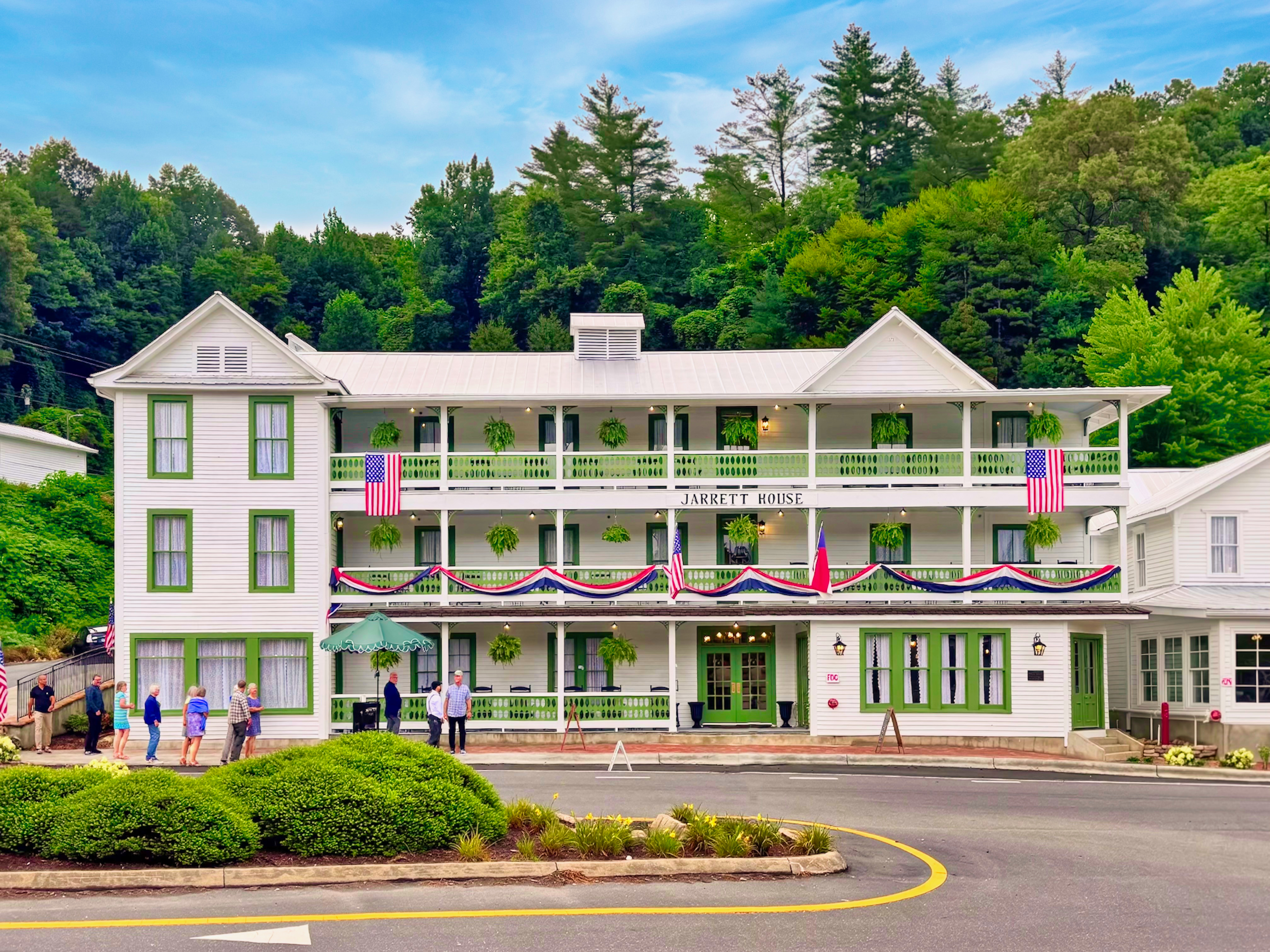
The Jarrett House in 2026

A rivalry existed between Sylva and Dillsboro in their early days, as the efforts of one town were matched by the other, and the two towns were very much alike, and the same distance from the then-county seat of Webster. But a flood in 1894 ended the milling operations of the Blue Ridge Lumber Company, and near the turn of the century, two back-to-back floods at a tannery construction site in Dillsboro caused owner C.J. Harris to move the factory to the present site of the Jackson Paper Plant in Sylva. Around 1899, Dillsboro was the most-populated non-county seat town in the state west of Asheville with about 750 residents.

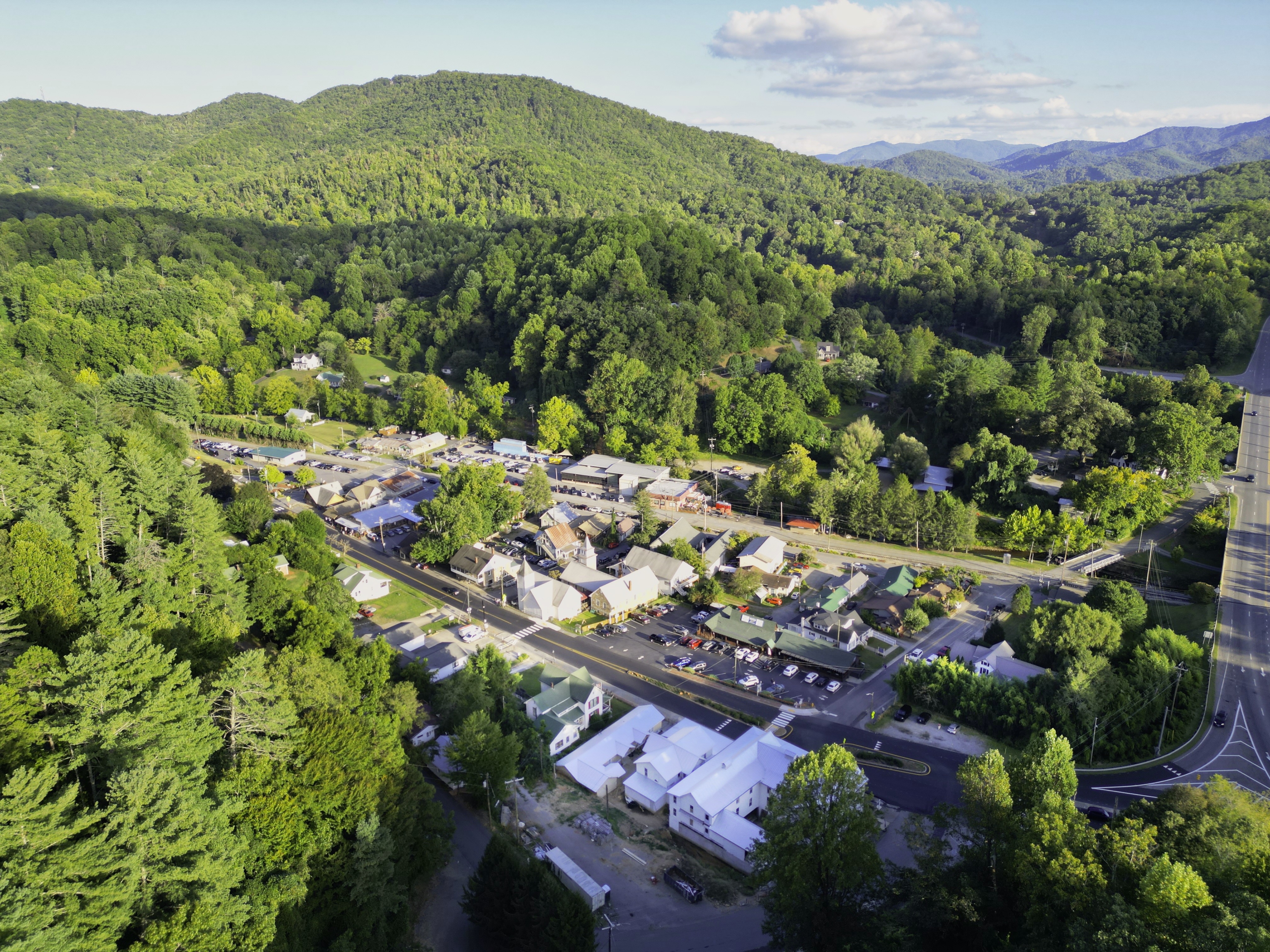
Aerial photo of downtown Dillsboro

Dillsboro's population has declined over the years, mostly due to little new housing being built in town limits and the fact that many homes are now shops in the downtown area. Since 1975, when Wade W. Wilson became mayor due to many write-in votes, Dillsboro has made a successful effort to restore many older buildings in the town to their original appearance.

In 2012, the Dillsboro Dam and Powerhouse were demolished to restore the Tuckasegee River's ecosystem. Downtown Dillsboro was partially flooded in 2024 during Hurricane Helene.

The Jarrett House and Elias Brendle Monteith House and Outbuildings are listed on the National Register of Historic Places.

Gertrude Dills McKee, first woman elected to the North Carolina State Senate, was a native of Dillsboro; she was the daughter of William Allen Dills.

== Geography ==
According to the United States Census Bureau, the town has a total area of 0.4 square miles (1.0 km^{2}), all land.

== Demographics ==
Historical population
| Census | Pop. | Note | %± |
|---|---|---|---|
| 1900 | 279 | | — |
| 1910 | 277 | | −0.7% |
| 1920 | 228 | | −17.7% |
| 1930 | 284 | | 24.6% |
| 1940 | 290 | | 2.1% |
| 1950 | 198 | | −31.7% |
| 1960 | 140 | | −29.3% |
| 1970 | 215 | | 53.6% |
| 1980 | 179 | | −16.7% |
| 1990 | 95 | | −46.9% |
| 2000 | 205 | | 115.8% |
| 2010 | 232 | | 13.2% |
| 2020 | 213 | | −8.2% |
U.S. Decennial Census

=== 2020 census ===
Dillsboro racial composition
| Race | Number | Percentage |
|---|---|---|
| White (non-Hispanic) | 168 | 78.87% |
| Black or African American (non-Hispanic) | 1 | 0.47% |
| Native American | 6 | 2.82% |
| Asian | 5 | 2.35% |
| Other/Mixed | 17 | 7.98% |
| Hispanic or Latino | 16 | 7.51% |

As of the 2020 United States census, there were 213 people, 112 households, and 53 families residing in the town.

=== 2000 census ===
As of the census of 2000, there were 205 people, 111 households, and 45 families residing in the town. The population density was 516.1 inhabitants per square mile (199.3/km^{2}). There were 126 housing units at an average density of 317.2 per square mile (122.5/km^{2}). The racial makeup of the town was 92.68% White, 0.98% African American, 3.41% Asian, and 2.93% from two or more races. Hispanic or Latino of any race were 0.98% of the population.

There were 111 households, out of which 15.3% had children under the age of 18 living with them, 33.3% were married couples living together, 7.2% had a female householder with no husband present, and 58.6% were non-families. 54.1% of all households were made up of individuals, and 34.2% had someone living alone who was 65 years of age or older. The average household size was 1.85 and the average family size was 2.85.

In the town, the population was spread out, with 16.6% under the age of 18, 5.9% from 18 to 24, 24.9% from 25 to 44, 21.0% from 45 to 64, and 31.7% who were 65 years of age or older. The median age was 48 years. For every 100 females, there were 66.7 males. For every 100 females age 18 and over, there were 59.8 males.

The median income for a household in the town was $18,750, and the median income for a family was $27,188. Males had a median income of $20,000 versus $20,000 for females. The per capita income for the town was $14,365. About 12.8% of families and 22.8% of the population were below the poverty line, including none of those under the age of eighteen and 30.9% of those 65 or over.

== In popular culture ==
The train wreck scene in the movie The Fugitive (1993) was filmed on a portion of the Great Smoky Mountains Railroad in Dillsboro.

== See also ==
National Register of Historic Places listings in Jackson County, North Carolina
