= Downtown Sylva Historic District =

Historic district in North Carolina, United States

- U.S. National Register of Historic Places
- U.S. Historic district
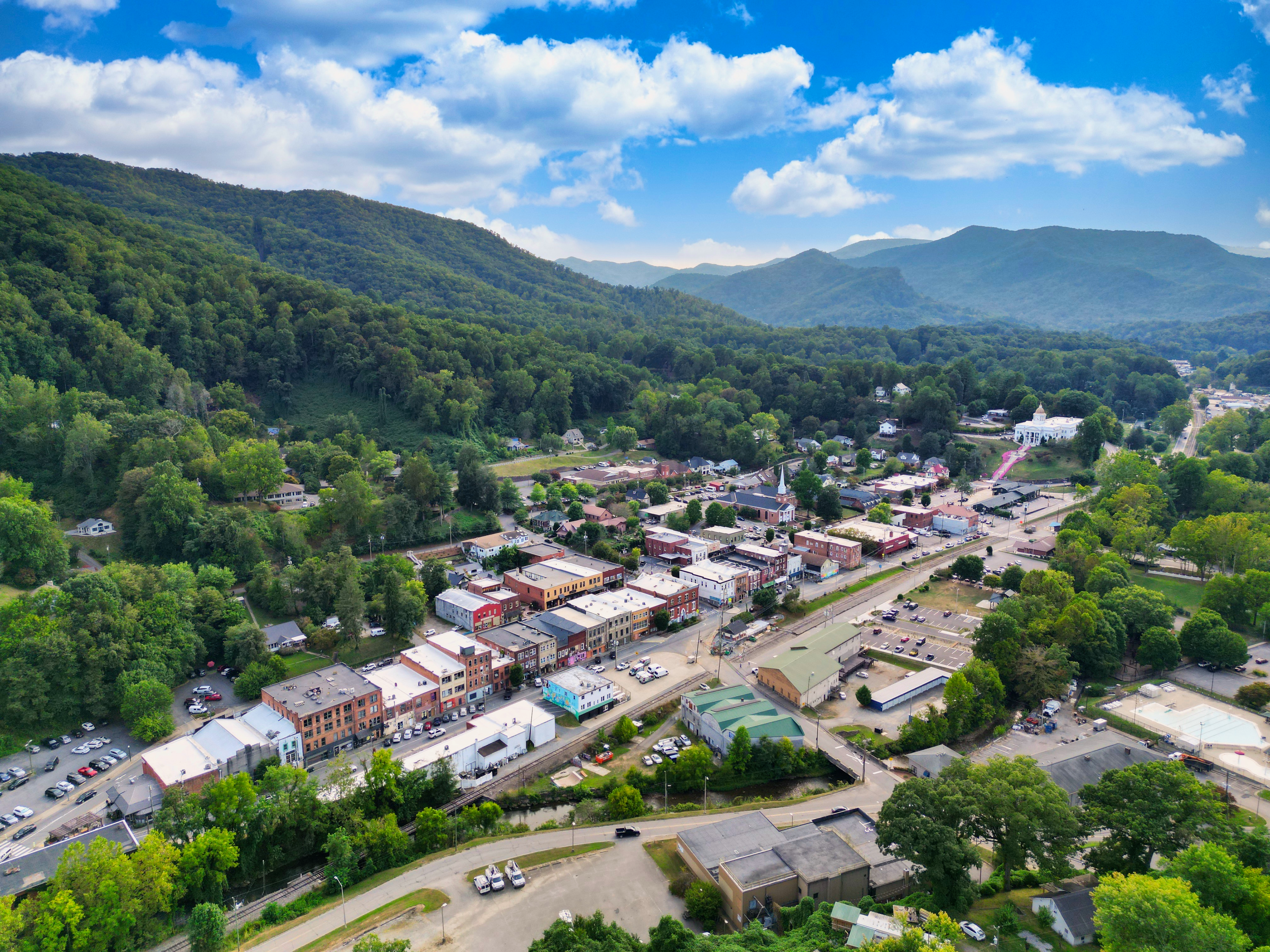

- Location within North Carolina Location within the United States
- Location: Roughly bounded by Southern RR., Main, Landis & Jackson Sts., Sylva, North Carolina
- Coordinates: 35°22′25″N 83°13′29″W
- Area: 13.07 acres (5.29 ha)
- Built: c. 1900-1964
- Built by: Wells, Charles Marion
- Architect: Ellington, Douglas
- Architectural style: Italianate, Commercial Style, Classical Revival, Modern Movement, Queen Anne, Craftsman
- NRHP reference No.: 14000545
- Added to NRHP: September 3, 2014

Downtown Sylva Historic District is a national historic district located at Sylva, Jackson County, North Carolina. The district encompasses 41 contributing buildings and 3 contributing structures in the central business district of Sylva. They are dated between about 1900 and 1964, and include notable examples of Italianate, Classical Revival, Modern Movement, Queen Anne, and American Craftsman style architecture. Notable buildings include the C. J. Harris Building (c. 1900-1908), New Jackson Hotel (c. 1920, 1926), Medford Furniture Company (1923), Great Atlantic and Pacific Tea Company (1925), the Sylvan Theatre (1927) designed by architect Douglas Ellington, Jackson County Bank's Sylva branch (1926), Cogdill Motors (1934), Moody Funeral Home (1946), Saint John's Episcopal Church (1956), and the United States Post Office (1964).

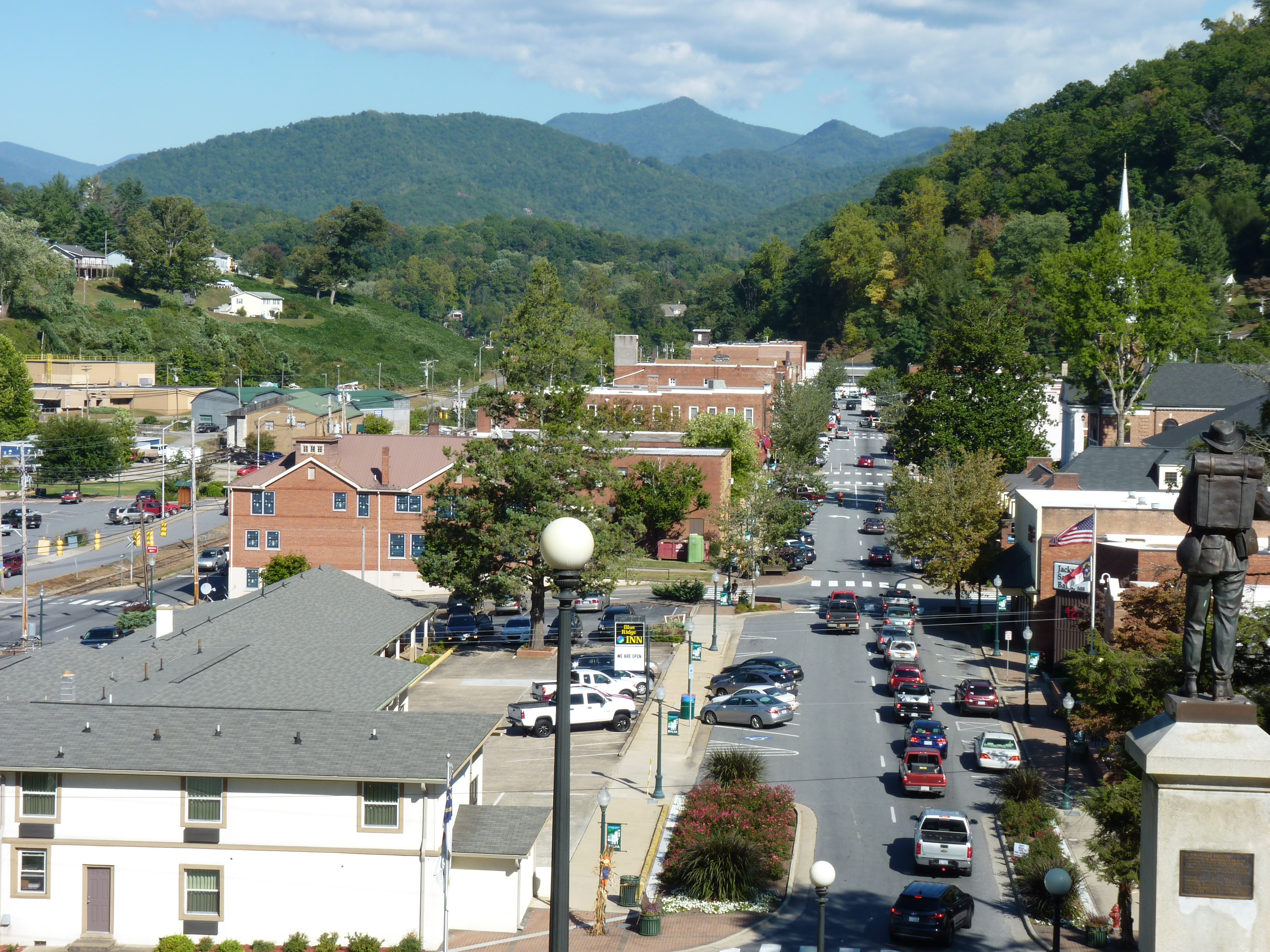
View of downtown Sylva

It was listed on the National Register of Historic Places in 2014.
