= Jackson County Courthouse (North Carolina) =

Hiatoric courthouse in North Carolina, US

- U.S. National Register of Historic Places
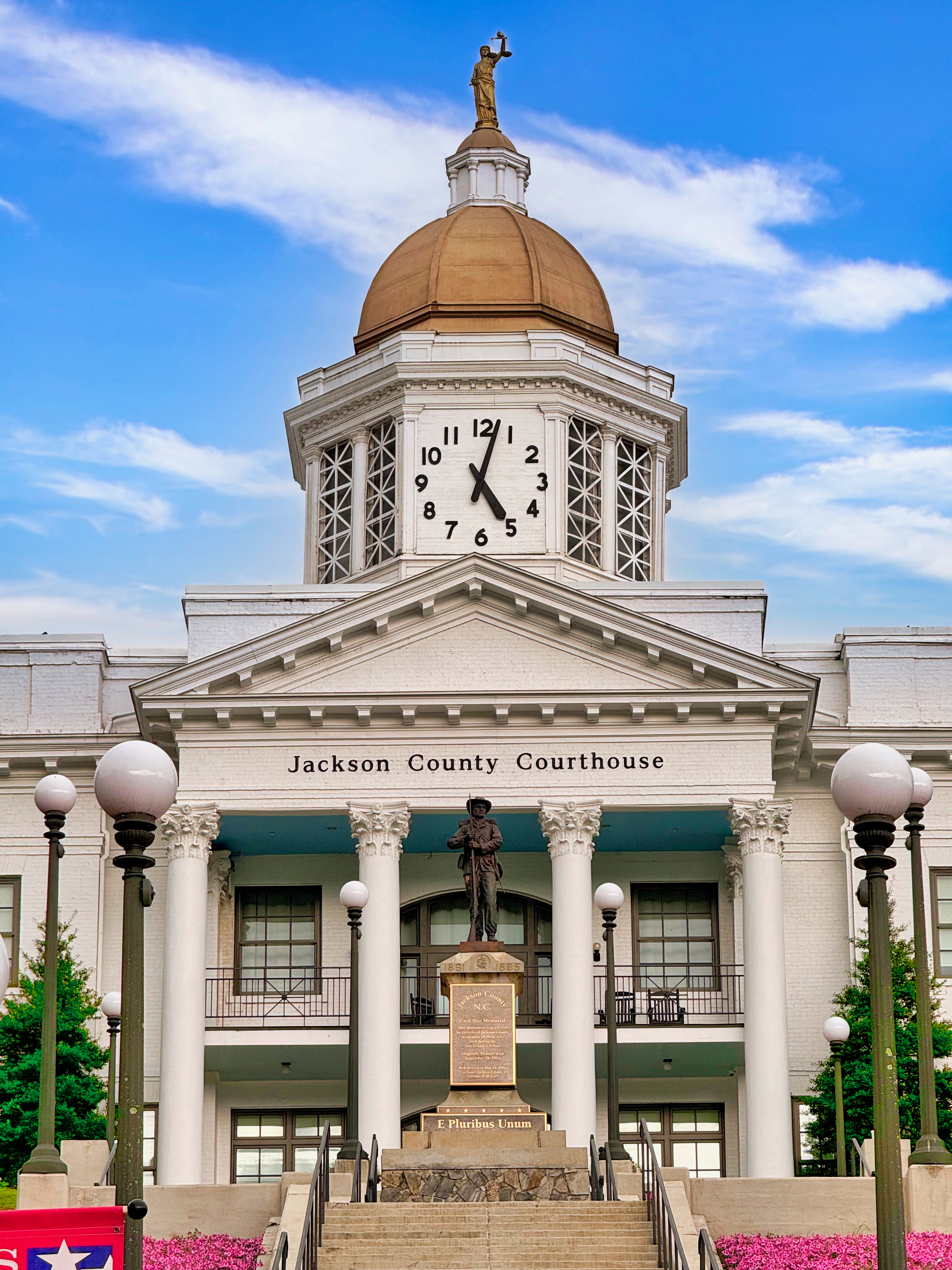
- Jackson County Courthouse from Main Street

- Location within North Carolina Location within the United States
- Interactive map showing the location of Jackson County Courthouse
- Location: Main Street, Sylva, North Carolina
- Coordinates: 35°22′26″N 83°13′41″W
- Area: 5.5 acres (2.2 ha)
- Built: 1913
- Architect: Smith & Carrier
- Architectural style: Classical Revival
- MPS: North Carolina County Courthouses TR
- NRHP reference No.: 79001727
- Added to NRHP: May 10, 1979

Jackson County Courthouse is an historic courthouse located at Sylva, serving Jackson County, North Carolina. It was designed by Smith & Carrier and built in 1913, when Sylva took over the county seat designation from Webster.

== The building ==
The Jackson County Courthouse is situated on a hill at the end of main street, and there are 107 steps leading up to its front portico from the fountain and plaza at street level. It is a two-story, Classical Revival style brick buildings with a three-stage cupola. It was built after Charles Joseph Harris pushed the county to vote for the removal of the county seat from Webster (where it had been since 1851) to Sylva, and the measure passed and the seat was relocated. Harris then as part of the agreement built a courthouse with the sum of money not exceeding $30,000. The building was patterned after the Madison County Courthouse in Marshall, North Carolina. The 1913 Courthouse served as the county's courthouse from 1914 until the present Justice Center was built in 1994 on Grindstaff Cove Road east of town near US 74. It had been previously renovated in 1950 when the mezzanine third floor was painted white and four windows were added to the front and back of the third floor. It was renovated again in 1969, when the red bricks were painted white, a clock added to the dome, the pine trees along the steps that hid the building from the street and lined the steps were also removed.

In 2007, the Courthouse site was selected for the location of the new Jackson County Public Library. The old Jail from 1963 was demolished at this time, and the original jail from 1913 was demolished in 2009, when the new library started being constructed.

The Jackson County Courthouse was listed on the National Register of Historic Places in 1979.

== The jails ==
The original jail was small, about the size of a house. It served as the main county jail until a big red brick structure was built between it and the courthouse in 1963. They were both two floors tall and connected by a one floor tall office wing on the 1963 building. The jails were abandoned in favor of a new facility around 2000. Both jails were recently demolished in preparation for the construction of the new Library on their sites.

== New Jackson County Public Library ==
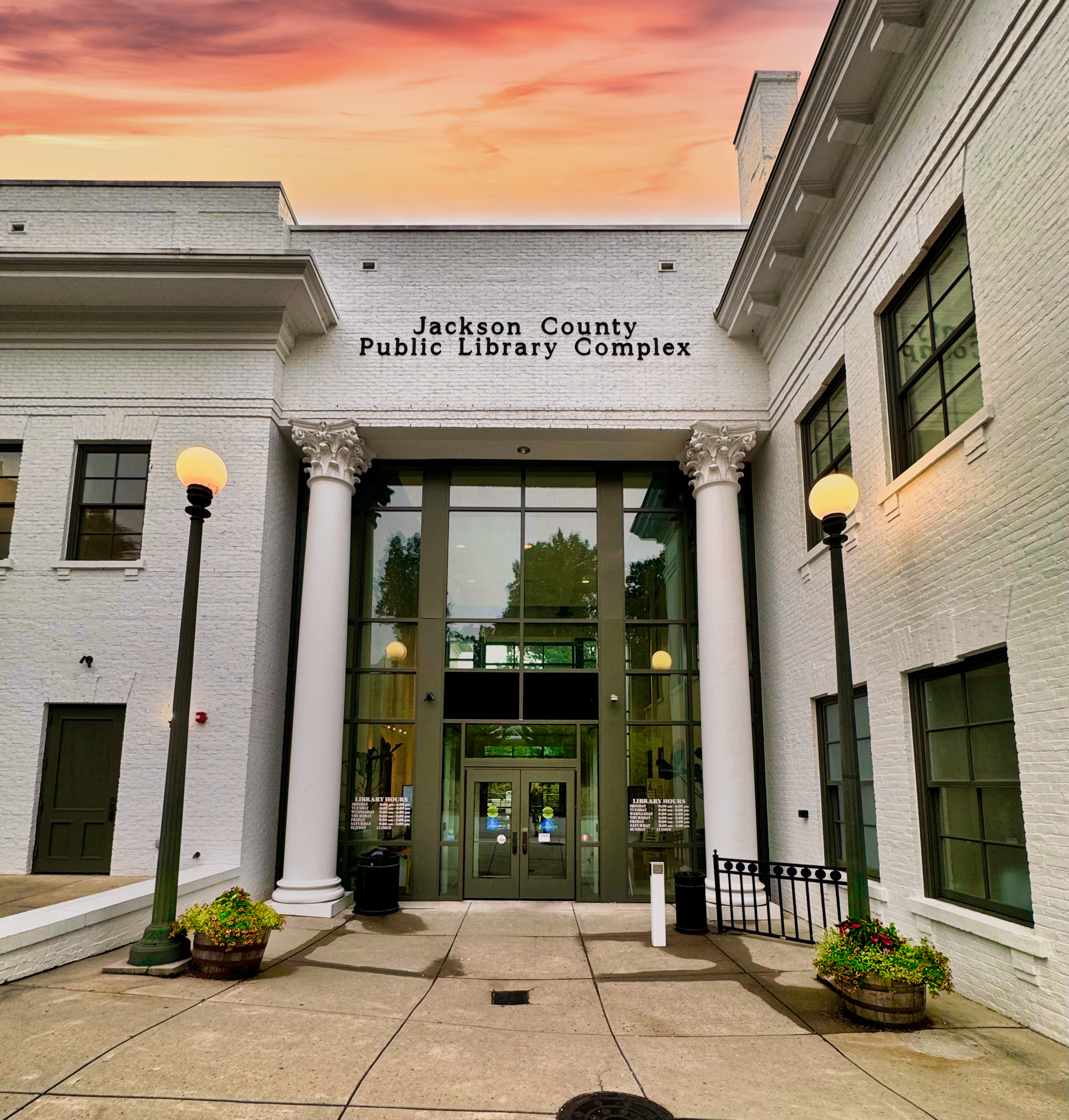
Jackson County Public Library

Construction started in 2009 on a 20,000 sq. ft. two-story addition to house the library, which was built onto the back of the historic courthouse, and incorporates elements of the old building into it. The library connects with the back of the courthouse via large glass roofed atrium. The new building replaced a 6,000 sq. ft. one-story structure that was built in 1970 on Main Street. The old courthouse was restored to house the Jackson County Genealogical Society, Arts Council, and Historical Society. Plans included an auditorium in the former courtroom and new windows and doors installed as part of the restoration. The iconic dome and clocktower of the building was removed for the third time since its construction for renovation work (it was removed in 2010 and replaced in 2011, and it was previously removed in 1969 and 1994), and the entire complex was scheduled to open in May 2011.

== See also ==
- National Register of Historic Places listings in Jackson County, North Carolina
