= Sylva, North Carolina =

- Town
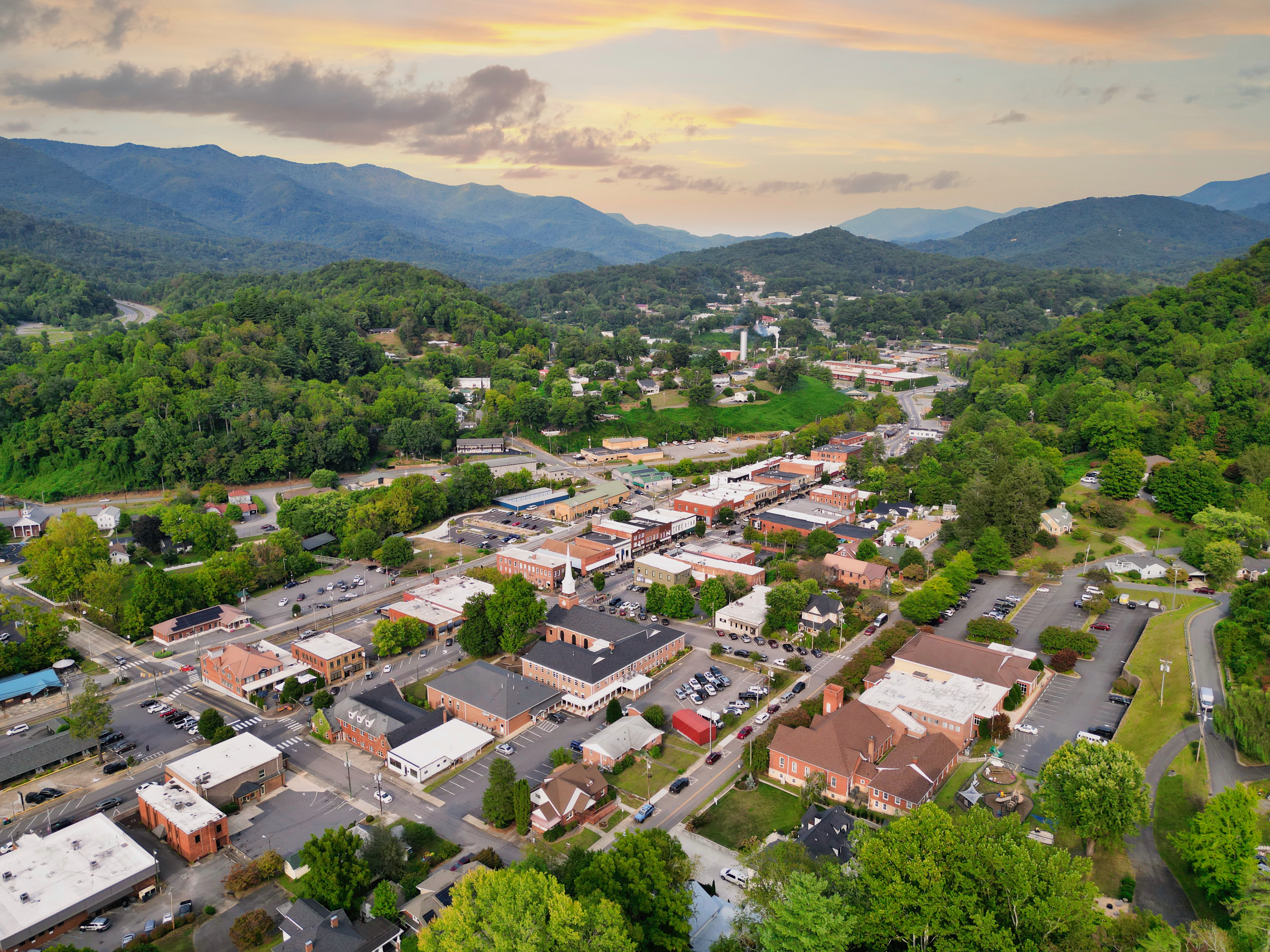
- Downtown Sylva

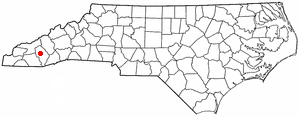
- Location in North Carolina
- Coordinates: 35°22′27″N 83°13′4″W
- Country: United States
- State: North Carolina
- County: Jackson
- Incorporated: 1889
- Named for: William D. Sylva

Government
  - Mayor: Johnny Phillips

Area
  - Total: 3.17 sq mi (8.21 km^{2})
  - Land: 3.17 sq mi (8.21 km^{2})
  - Water: 0 sq mi (0.00 km^{2}) 0%
- Elevation: 2,080 ft (630 m)

Population (2020)
  - Total: 2,578
  - Density: 812.8/sq mi (313.84/km^{2})
- Time zone: UTC-5 (Eastern)
  - Summer (DST): UTC-4 (EDT)
- ZIP code: 28779
- Area code: 828
- FIPS code: 37-66500
- GNIS feature ID: 2406705
- Website: www.townofsylva.org

Sylva is an incorporated town located in central Jackson County, in the Plott Balsam Mountains of Western North Carolina, United States. As of the 2020 census, Sylva had a population of 2,578. It is the county seat, taking over the role from nearby Webster in 1913.

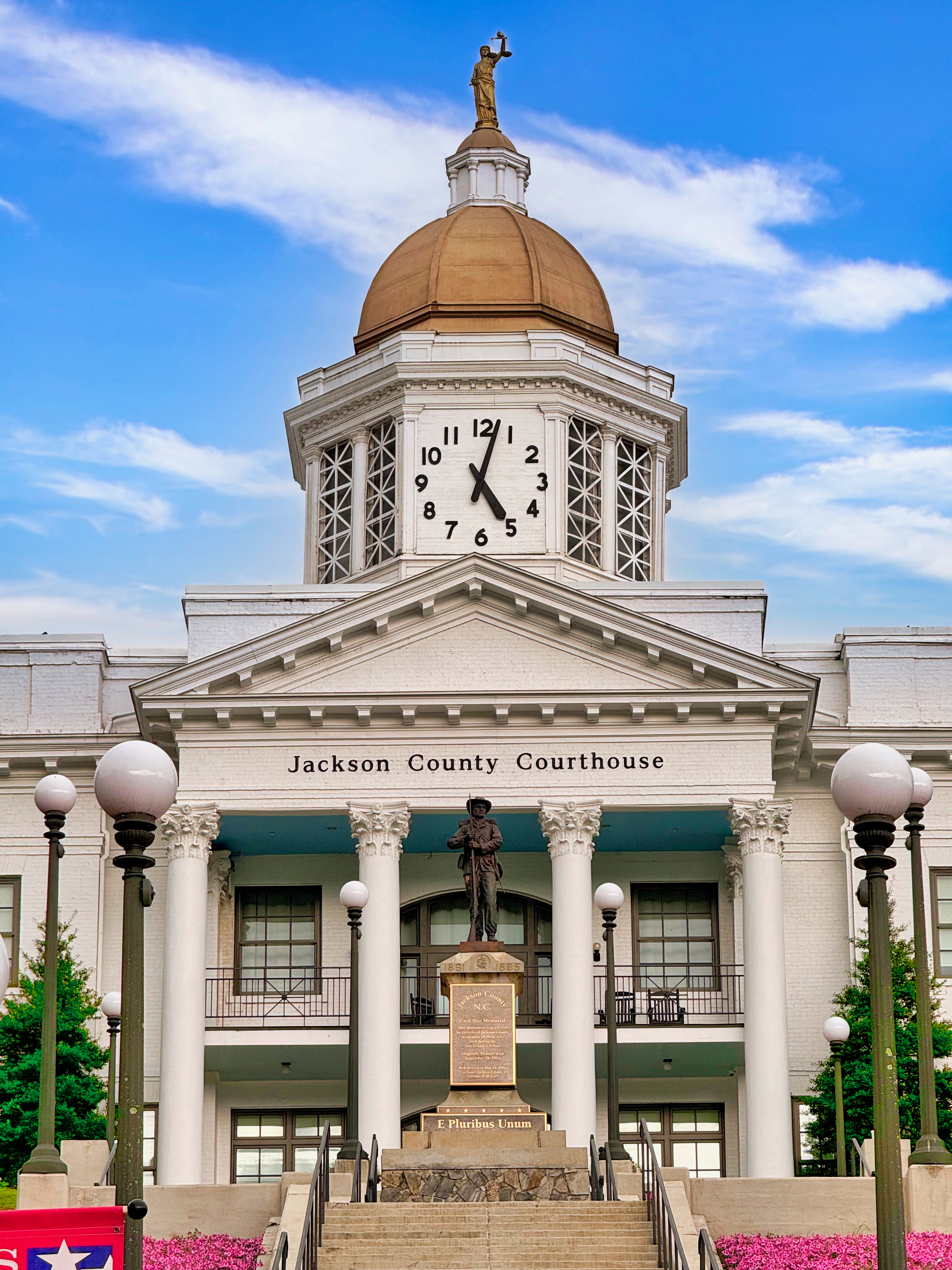
Historic Jackson County Courthouse in downtown Sylva

== Etymology ==
According to popular accounts, Sylva is named after William D. Sylva, a Danish handyman who spent a month in the home of General E. R. Hampton, who owned much of the land later developed as downtown Sylva. When the town applied for a post office, Hampton asked his young daughter, Mae, what the town's name should be. She liked the handyman so much that she said, "Sylva." This account is disputed. According to a 21st-century investigation, the handyman, William D. Sylva, was not Danish, and it is likely that his surname was not Sylva. His last name was "Selvey;" the letter that he wrote to the town was likely in Portuguese, not Danish; and he was probably from the Little Canada Community. His daughter's maiden last name was Selvey, according to genealogical archives. Her daughter (who recently came to the town) said that her grandfather's surname was "Selvey" instead.

== History ==
The town became the county seat in 1913, after the county voted to move the seat from Webster to Sylva, which had gained a railroad station. Subsequently, Webster declined, as the railroad had not established a stop there. Many businesses followed the court and railroad to Sylva. The Jackson County Courthouse was constructed in 1914 and is located on a hill at the end of Main Street in downtown Sylva. The building no longer serves as the official courthouse; the Justice Center, was constructed in 1994 a few blocks away. Since 2011, the Jackson County Courthouse has been the site of the Jackson County Public Library.

Sylva was once home to Dills Falls (also called Bumgarner Falls and Dills Cove Falls), which was partially destroyed in the early 1970s to build the Great Smoky Mountains Expressway and exists only as a remnant today. Many Sylva residents claim this made Sylva the only town in the US to have a waterfall within its town limits. (This waterfall is not to be confused with Dill Falls, also in Jackson County, NC.)

The town had the first municipally owned swimming pool west of Asheville. The stone and concrete pool was built in 1938 by the WPA during the Great Depression, and it was demolished in 1969 to be replaced by the current pool. Thomas Edison and Franklin D. Roosevelt both traveled through Sylva: Edison in 1911 and FDR in 1936 during his presidency.

The Downtown Sylva Historic District, Dr. D. D. Hooper House, and Jackson County Courthouse are listed on the National Register of Historic Places.

== Geography ==
According to the United States Census Bureau, the town has a total area of 3.2 square miles (8.3 km^{2}), all land.

Sylva is close to the Cherokee Indian Reservation (the Eastern band) and the Great Smoky Mountains National Park, both of which are popular, well-known vacation spots.

== Demographics ==
Historical population
Census	Pop.	Note	%±
1900	281		—
1910	698		148.4%
1920	863		23.6%
1930	1,340		55.3%
1940	1,409		5.1%
1950	1,382		−1.9%
1960	1,564		13.2%
1970	1,561		−0.2%
1980	1,699		8.8%
1990	1,809		6.5%
2000	2,435		34.6%
2010	2,588		6.3%
2020	2,578		−0.4%
U.S. Decennial Census

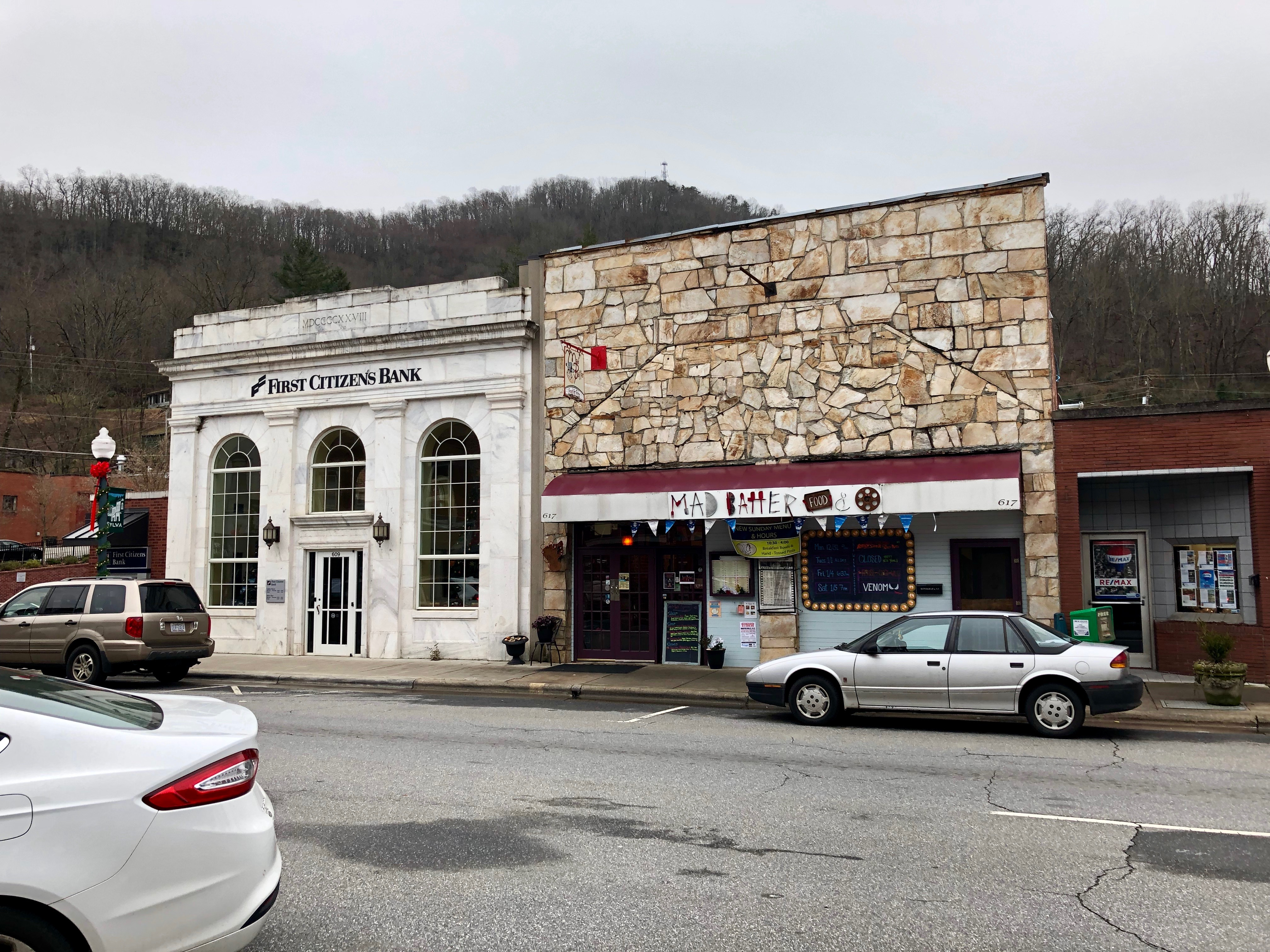
Downtown Sylva Historic District

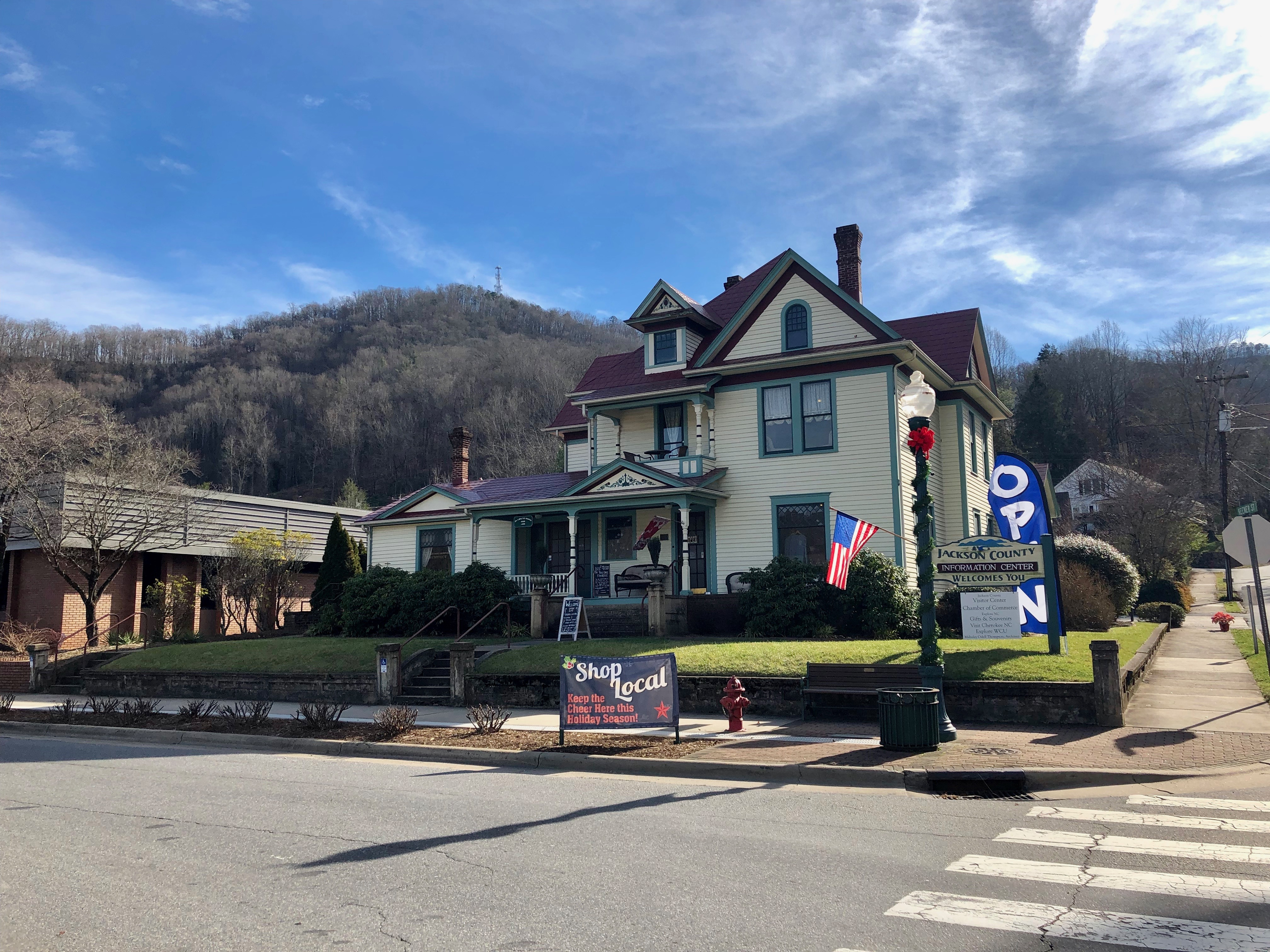
Dr. D. D. Hooper House (1906)

=== 2020 census ===
As of the 2020 census, Sylva had a population of 2,578. The median age was 37.1 years. 22.5% of residents were under the age of 18 and 17.3% of residents were 65 years of age or older. For every 100 females there were 95.2 males, and for every 100 females age 18 and over there were 91.3 males age 18 and over.

98.1% of residents lived in urban areas, while 1.9% lived in rural areas.

There were 1,032 households and 552 families in Sylva, of which 27.1% had children under the age of 18 living in them. Of all households, 31.3% were married-couple households, 25.0% were households with a male householder and no spouse or partner present, and 34.5% were households with a female householder and no spouse or partner present. About 37.6% of all households were made up of individuals and 14.3% had someone living alone who was 65 years of age or older.

There were 1,213 housing units, of which 14.9% were vacant. The homeowner vacancy rate was 2.7% and the rental vacancy rate was 6.6%.

Sylva racial composition
Race	Number	Percentage
White (non-Hispanic)	1,902	73.78%
Black or African American (non-Hispanic)	87	3.37%
Native American	75	2.91%
Asian	72	2.79%
Other/Mixed	106	4.11%
Hispanic or Latino	336	13.03%

=== 2000 census ===
As of the census of 2000, there were 2,435 people, 1,137 households, and 608 families residing in the town. The population density was 759.7 inhabitants per square mile (293.3/km^{2}). There were 1,283 housing units at an average density of 400.3 per square mile (154.6/km^{2}). The racial makeup of the town was 89.16% White, 4.68% African American, 1.60% Native American, 1.31% Asian, 0.82% from other races, and 2.42% from two or more races. Hispanic or Latino of any race were 2.51% of the population.

There were 1,137 households, out of which 21.7% had children under the age of 18 living with them, 37.1% were married couples living together, 12.5% had a female householder with no husband present, and 46.5% were non-families. 39.6% of all households were made up of individuals, and 16.2% had someone living alone who was 65 years of age or older. The average household size was 2.04 and the average family size was 2.74.

In the town, the population was spread out, with 18.4% under the age of 18, 12.0% from 18 to 24, 26.7% from 25 to 44, 22.6% from 45 to 64, and 20.3% who were 65 years of age or older. The median age was 39 years. For every 100 females, there were 89.2 males. For every 100 females aged 18 and over, there were 84.1 males.

The median income for a household in the town was $26,432, and the median income for a family was $36,711. Males had a median income of $25,526 versus $22,401 for females. The per capita income for the town was $17,348. About 13.9% of families and 19.6% of the population were below the poverty line, including 26.9% of those under age 18 and 18.6% of those age 65 or over.

== Infrastructure ==
=== Education ===
Sylva is home to the Jackson Campus of Southwestern Community College and is the closest town of size to nearby Western Carolina University (6 miles (9.7 km) away), one of the seventeen schools of the University of North Carolina system.

The town has the main county high school, Smoky Mountain High School, and two K-8 elementary schools: Scotts Creek east of town, and Fairview located behind the high school.

=== Healthcare ===
Sylva and all of Jackson County are served by Harris Regional Hospital. It is licensed for 86 beds. The facility also serves Swain, Macon and Graham counties in western North Carolina and is affiliated with Duke LifePoint.

=== Media ===
The local newspaper is The Sylva Herald, which was founded in 1926.

== Events ==
Greening Up The Mountains Festival takes place on the fourth Saturday in April, a family-friendly downtown street festival that draws more than 10,000 people for arts, old time Appalachian crafts, local music, ethnic and locally inspired cuisine, tastings from multiple local craft breweries, and many child-friendly activities.

The Hook, Line & Drinker Festival takes place in May, which celebrates the designation of the area as a popular spot for fishing, and features fly fishing guides, fishing industry vendors, craft beer vendors, children's activities and bands at Bridge Park.

Concerts on The Creek is an event that takes place every Friday night from Memorial Day to Labor Day at Sylva Bridge Park.

== In popular culture ==
Several movies have been filmed in Sylva, including the 1972 movie Deliverance (along Mill Street), the 1997 movie Paradise Falls (also known as Carolina Low), and the 1993 blockbuster The Fugitive (at Harris Regional Hospital, a scene where the town is seen from Sylvan Heights right after the train wreck, and along Scotts Creek where it crosses West Main Street). The train wreck scene in The Fugitive was filmed 2 miles (3.2 km) west of Sylva in the town of Dillsboro. The scene of Harrison Ford walking on railroad tracks in an old tunnel was also close by in Cowee Tunnel. The town was also the site of filming for the 2017 film Three Billboards Outside Ebbing, Missouri.

== Notable people ==
- Zeb Alley, lawyer, lobbyist, and politician
- Michael Bingham, track athlete, 2008 Summer Olympics bronze medalist in the 400m relay
- Sean Bridgers, actor in Deadwood, Get Shorty, Rectify, and Carolina Low
- David McKee Hall, U.S. Representative from North Carolina
- Frank Huguelet, professional wrestler and reality TV star
- Evy Leibfarth, slalom canoeist and 2024 Summer Olympics bronze medalist
- Zebby Matthews, MLB pitcher for the Minnesota Twins
- Dan K. Moore, was the 66th Governor of North Carolina
- John Morgan, country music artist
- Johnny Oates, former Major League Baseball player and manager
- Cal Raleigh, MLB catcher for the Seattle Mariners
- Nick Searcy, actor in Cast Away, also played a sheriff in The Fugitive (which filmed partially in Sylva)
- Matt Stillwell, country music artist
- Ed Sutton, former NFL player

== See also ==
- Smoky Mountain High School
- National Register of Historic Places listings in Jackson County, North Carolina
- Jackson County Courthouse (Sylva, North Carolina)
