= Biggs (surname) =

Biggs is an English surname. Notable people with the surname include:

- Mr. Biggs, stage name of Ronald Isley

== A ==
- Asa Biggs (1811–1878), American politician
- Andy Biggs (b. 1958), American politician from Arizona

== B ==
- Barton Biggs (1932–2012), money manager
- Basil Biggs (1819–1906), American laborer and veterinarian
- Benjamin T. Biggs (1821–1893), American politician
- Brian Biggs (b. 1968), American illustrator

== C ==
- Casey Biggs (b. 1955), American actor
- Cecil Biggs (1881–1944), British rugby player and cricketer
- Christopher Ewart-Biggs (1921–1976), British diplomat assassinated by the PIRA

== D ==
- D. E. Biggs (1860–1924), American politician
- Don Biggs (born 1965), Canadian ice hockey player
- Donald Biggs (1930–2024), American politician in Kansas

== E ==
- E. Power Biggs (1906–1977), British-American organist
- Electra Waggoner Biggs (1912–2001), American sculptor

== G ==
- Gregory Biggs (1964–2001), American car accident victim

== H ==
- Hermann Biggs (1859–1923), American physician and public health pioneer

== I ==
- Ione Biggs (1916–2005), American human rights activist

== J ==
- J. Biggs (b. 1965), wrestling manager Clarence Mason
- Janet Biggs (b. 1959), American artist
- James Crawford Biggs (1872–1960), American lawyer and politician
- Jason Biggs (b. 1978), American actor
- John Biggs (London politician) (b. 1957), British politician
- John Biggs Jr. (1895–1979), American jurist
- John B. Biggs (b. 1934), educational psychologist and novelist
- John H. Biggs (b. 1936), American business executive
- John Biggs-Davison (1918–1988), British politician
- Joshua Biggs (1821–1888), American politician from Maryland

== M ==
- Margaret Biggs (b. 1929), British children's writer
- Max Biggs (1923–1990), American basketball player

== N ==
- Norman L. Biggs (b. 1941), British mathematician
- Norman Biggs (1870–1908), Wales rugby player

== R ==
- Rachel Charlotte Biggs (1763–1827), English author, letter writer and spy
- Ralph Biggs (b. 1976), American basketball player
- Richard Biggs (1960–2004), American actor
- Riley Biggs (1900–1971), American football player
- Ronnie Biggs (1929–2013), British criminal
- Rosemary Biggs (1912–2001), British haematologist
- Roxann Biggs, American actress Roxann Dawson

== S ==
- Selwyn Biggs (1872–1943), Welsh rugby player

== T ==
- Tony Biggs, Australian radio personality
- Tyrell Biggs (b.1960), American boxer

== V ==
- Verlon Biggs (1943–1994), American football player

== See also ==
- Place names: Biggs (disambiguation)
- Bigg (disambiguation)
- Briggs (disambiguation)
