= Biggs =

Biggs may refer to:

== Arts and entertainment ==
- Biggs (TV channel), a Portuguese television channel formerly for kids, teens and youth and now for teens and youth.
- Biggs Darklighter, a character in Star Wars Episode IV: A New Hope
- Biggs, a recurring character in the Final Fantasy series of role-playing games

== Business and organizations ==
- bigg's, a hypermarket chain in Ohio and Kentucky
- Mr. Bigg's, Nigerian fast food chain
- Biggs Furniture of Richmond, Virginia

== People ==
- Biggs (surname)
- Kareem Burke, nicknamed "Biggs", an American entrepreneur and record executive
- Ronald Isley, stagename "Mr. Biggs", an American singer-songwriter and record executive

== Places ==
- Biggs, California, U.S.
- Biggs, Kentucky, U.S.
- Biggs Junction, Oregon, U.S.
- Biggs Army Airfield, Texas, U.S.
- Biggs Settlement, Michigan, U.S.

== See also ==
- Bigg (disambiguation)
- Big (disambiguation)
- Biggs jasper, a gemstone discovered near Biggs Junction
