= Alexander Hunter Bassett =

Alexander Hunter Bassett (November 22, 1795, died on October 8, 1880) was a planter and local leader in Henry County, Virginia.

== Early life ==
Alexander Hunter Bassett was the son of Burwell Bassett and Mary Hunter Bassett, and grandson and namesake of Alexander Hunter (planter) of Henry County, Virginia. Born into local wealth of several generations of tobacco planters, he was educated at home.

== Military Experience ==
At the age of 19, he was drafted as a private for the War of 1812 into the 64th Virginia militia, under Captain Graves' Company in the spring of 1815. At the US National Archives Military Service Branch, he has both a service and a pension file. He was given a warrant for 120 acres of land for his military service on July 1, 1853, and another forty acres of land in 1855. His service is recognized by the General Society of the War of 1812

== Farm life ==
Alexander Bassett purchased and sold land throughout Henry, Patrick County, Virginia and Franklin County, Virginia. He inherited a large portion of his father's estate of land. In addition to the government land warrants from his service, when parts of his family moved to Missouri in 1844, he also purchased their land plots of over 203 acres along Stroud's Creek as well. In 1845, he also purchased his brother William's tobacco acres as well. In 1858, he turned over 195 acres of land near Preston, Virginia to his son, Woodson.

== Family life ==
Alexander Hunter was married twice. The first time he was married to Mary Koger (June 12, 1793- April 28, 1868). They were married on April 29, 1818. "Alexander Bassett was known for his sterling character and industry. His wife, Mary Koger Bassett, was of unusually bright intellect and noted for her untiring industry and good management."

They had six children: Martha A. Bassett (February 24, 1819 – April 13, 1913). She married John S. Dyer and they moved to Lincoln County, Missouri;

Woodson Bassett (July 25, 1820 – December 22, 1917);

Eliza Jane Bassett (July 25, 1822 - March 23, 1872). She married Allan Hopper, and died childless;

Mary Catharine "Kitty" (August 24, 1824 – July 9, 1922). She married W. W. Hill, and they had ten children;

John H. Bassett (December 21, 1827 – February 4, 1915). He married Nancy Spencer. "He was a hardworking and honorable man. His wife was the best businesswoman in the county." Their sons were John D. Bassett, Charles Columbus Bassett Joe Bassett and Samuel H. Bassett. Together with their brother in law, Reed L. Stone, they formed the Bassett Furniture company in what would become Bassett, Virginia;

William Harden Bassett (June 22, 1828 – June 13, 1862). He died of fever while home on invalid leave from the 42nd Virginia Infantry, of the Confederate Army.

He married a second time to Ann R. Hardy on December 3, 1872. From the pension application, we know that she was born in Lunenburg County, Virginia, and was 64 years old, which makes her some 13 years younger than Alexander Bassett, who was 77 years old at the time. Her parents are also listed as "unknown" which indicates she may have been a foundling. This has all the appearance of an arranged marriage, as she could look after her husband for the rest of his life, and she would have a pension and income for the rest of hers. She applied for and was granted a pension based on his army service.
