= Robbinsville, North Carolina =

- Town
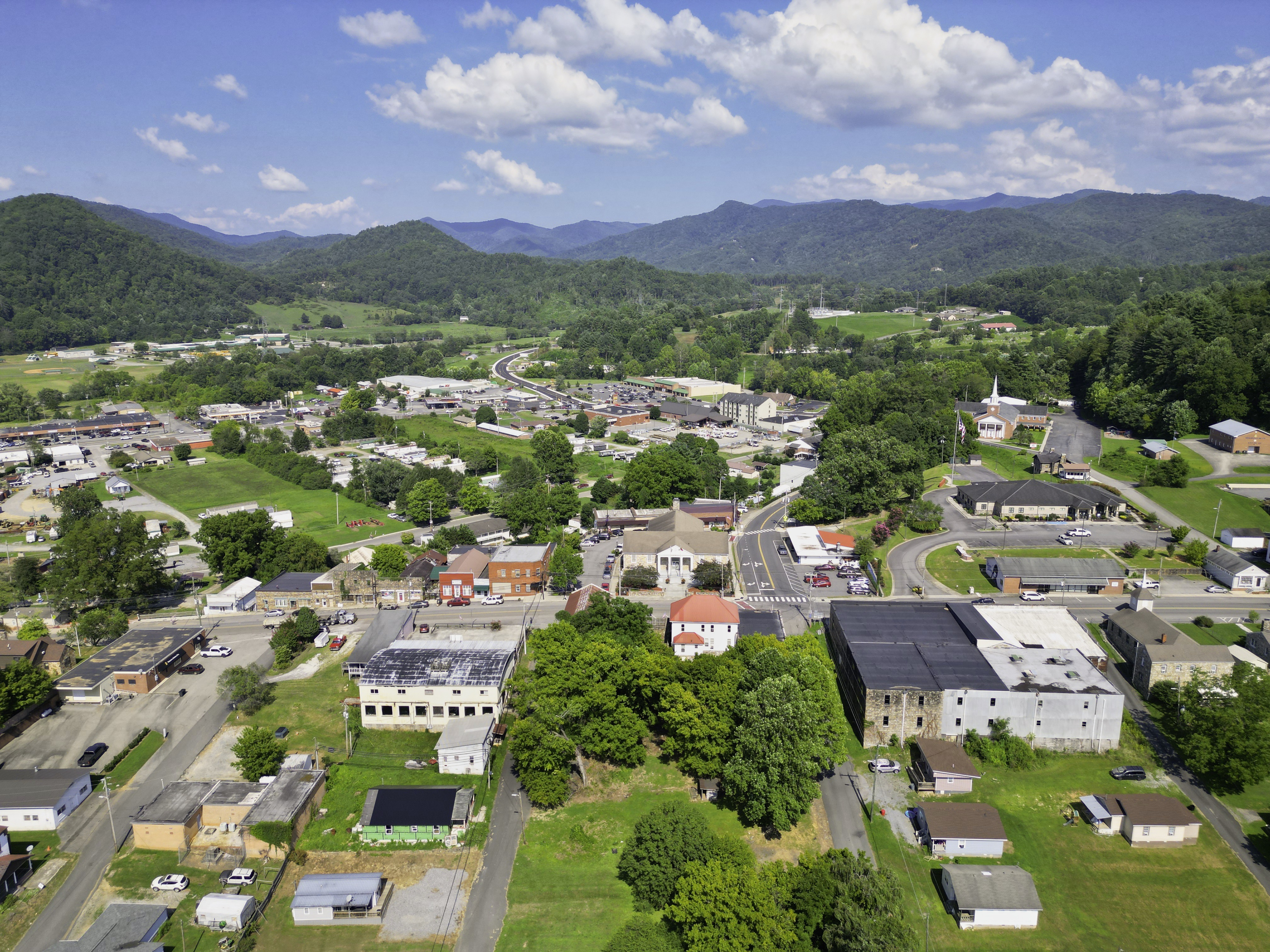
- Downtown Robbinsville

- Seal
- Motto: "Your Natural Destination."
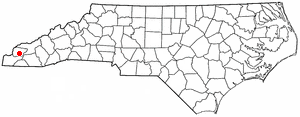
- Location in North Carolina
- Coordinates: 35°19′18″N 83°48′34″W
- Country: United States
- State: North Carolina
- County: Graham

Area
  - Total: 0.67 sq mi (1.73 km^{2})
  - Land: 0.66 sq mi (1.72 km^{2})
  - Water: 0.0039 sq mi (0.01 km^{2})
- Elevation: 2,018 ft (615 m)

Population (2020)
  - Total: 597
  - Density: 899.0/sq mi (347.11/km^{2})
- Time zone: UTC-5 (EST)
  - Summer (DST): UTC-4 (EDT)
- ZIP code: 28771
- Area code: 828
- FIPS code: 37-57020
- GNIS feature ID: 2407228
- Website: www.townofrobbinsville.com

Robbinsville is a town in Graham County, North Carolina, United States. The population was 597 at the 2020 census. It is the county seat of Graham County, county population 8,030.

== History ==
A trading post was established near present-day Robbinsville in the early 1840s and the town’s post office opened in 1843. The post office originally served Cheoah Valley, then Fort Montgomery in 1849. Robbinsville was incorporated on June 9, 1874. The town is believed to be named for N.C. state senator James L. Robinson. The town water system was installed in 1925.

The Graham County Courthouse was constructed in Robbinsville in 1874 but its floor collapsed two decades later while the building was packed during a murder trial. A replacement built in 1895 was the last wooden courthouse built in North Carolina. The third and current building was completed in 1942.

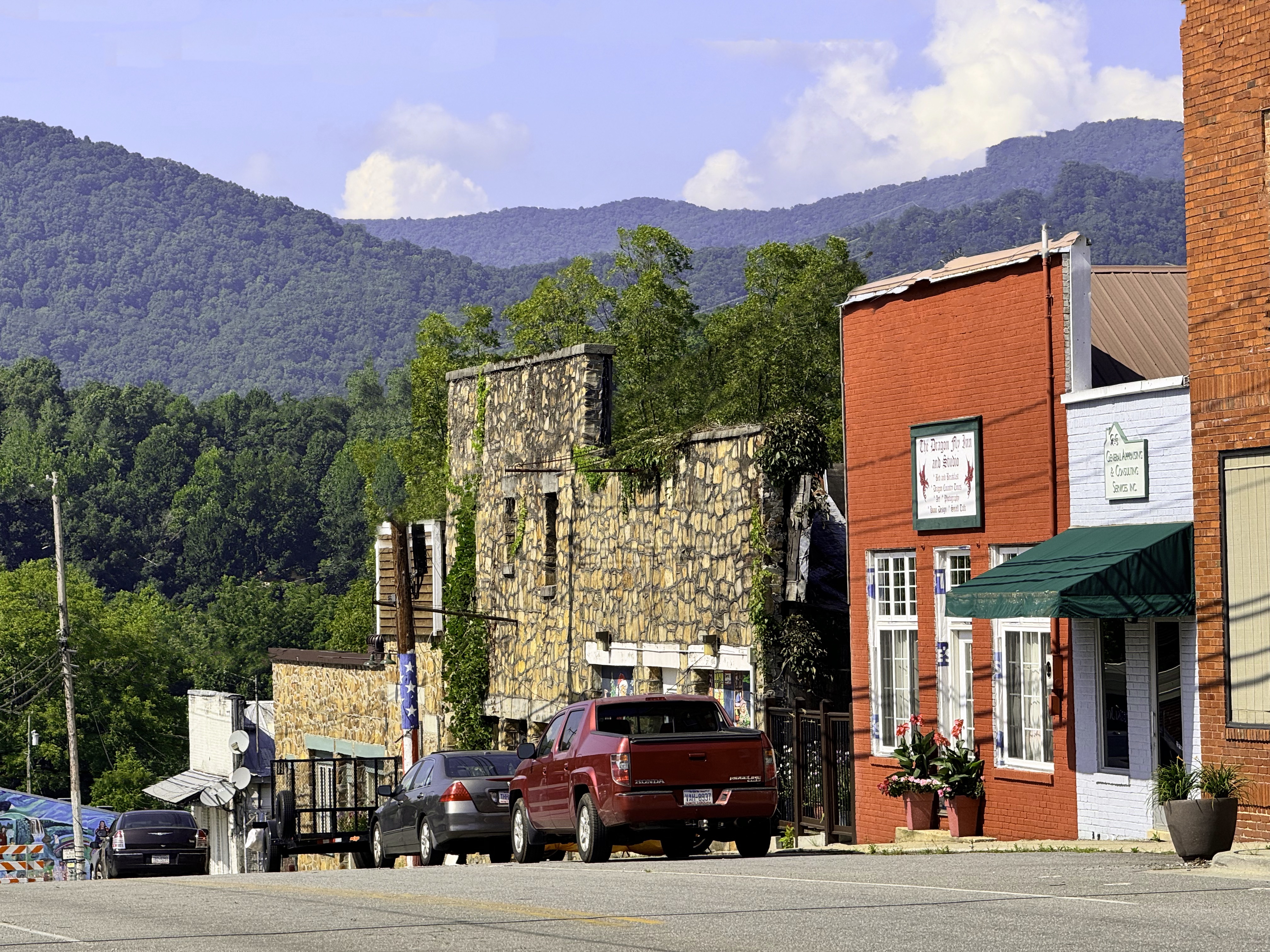
North Main Street in Robbinsville

Graham County's first public library opened in Robbinsville in 1939. The library joined the Nantahala Regional Library system in 1940. The building was demolished in 1952 and replaced with a newer facility which opened April 6, 1953.

Bemis Lumber Company and American Uniform previously had facilities in Robbinsville. James Lees Carpet Company operated in Robbinsville between 1957 and August 1971, employing about 400 people. The facility later became a Stanley Furniture plant and the town's largest industry and employer. That plant closed in mid-2014, laying off 400 workers. In July 2025, Eco King Solutions purchased the factory for a new manufacturing facility that plans to bring 515 jobs to area. Eco King is a US subsidiary of a Chinese company and is making its US debut in Robbinsville. The company makes plates, trays, etc for restaurants and markets.

=== Mayoral history ===
1. N.M.E. Slaughter (1893–)
2. R.B. Slaughter (c.1930–1943)
3. J.D. Stratton (c.1963)
4. Stephen Hooper (c.2019)
5. Shaun Adams (2021–present)

== Geography ==
According to the United States Census Bureau, the town has a total area of 0.4 square miles (1.0 km^{2}), all of it land.

=== Climate ===
Robbinsville is categorized as being within the 7a USDA hardiness zone, meaning temperatures can get as low as 0 to 5 °F. The climate is humid subtropical (Cfa). Summers are mild by southern standards, and winters are cool to cold. The largest snowfall in Robbinsville was the 1993 Storm of the Century where 15 to 20 inches fell. Rainfall is abundant year round with only a slight drop off in the autumn.

Climate data for Robinsville AG 5 NE, North Carolina (1991–2020 normals)
Month	Jan	Feb	Mar	Apr	May	Jun	Jul	Aug	Sep	Oct	Nov	Dec	Year
Mean daily maximum °F (°C)	45.2 (7.3)	50.1 (10.1)	57.8 (14.3)	68.2 (20.1)	74.6 (23.7)	78.7 (25.9)	83.0 (28.3)	82.0 (27.8)	77.6 (25.3)	68.4 (20.2)	58.3 (14.6)	48.4 (9.1)	62.0 (16.7)
Mean daily minimum °F (°C)	25.5 (−3.6)	28.1 (−2.2)	34.5 (1.4)	42.7 (5.9)	51.2 (10.7)	59.2 (15.1)	62.4 (16.9)	61.5 (16.4)	55.8 (13.2)	44.6 (7.0)	34.4 (1.3)	28.8 (−1.8)	44.1 (6.7)
Average precipitation inches (mm)	6.16 (156)	5.48 (139)	5.85 (149)	5.38 (137)	5.06 (129)	6.03 (153)	5.66 (144)	4.68 (119)	4.63 (118)	3.68 (93)	4.53 (115)	6.47 (164)	63.61 (1,616)
Source: NOAA

== Demographics ==
Historical population
Census	Pop.	Note	%±
1880	47		—
1910	122		—
1920	119		−2.5%
1930	345		189.9%
1940	399		15.7%
1950	515		29.1%
1960	587		14.0%
1970	777		32.4%
1980	814		4.8%
1990	709		−12.9%
2000	747		5.4%
2010	620		−17.0%
2020	597		−3.7%
U.S. Decennial Census

=== 2020 census ===
Robbinsville racial composition
Race	Number	Percentage
White (non-Hispanic)	470	78.73%
Black or African American (non-Hispanic)	13	2.18%
Native American	30	5.03%
Asian	5	0.84%
Other/Mixed	21	3.52%
Hispanic or Latino	58	9.72%

As of the 2020 United States census, there were 597 people, 317 households, and 156 families residing in the town.

=== 2010 census ===
As of the 2010 Census, there were 411 people, 283 households and 157 families. The population density was 135 people per square mile.

=== 2000 census ===
As of the census of 2000, there were 747 people, 346 households, and 207 families residing in the town. The population density was 1,663.4 inhabitants per square mile (642.2/km^{2}). There were 393 housing units at an average density of 875.1 per square mile (337.9/km^{2}). The racial makeup of the town was 94.38% White, 4.42% Native American, 0.54% from other races, and 0.67% from two or more races. Hispanic or Latino of any race were 0.67% of the population.

There were 346 households, out of which 27.5% had children under the age of 18 living with them, 39.6% were married couples living together, 16.5% had a female householder with no husband present, and 39.9% were non-families. 38.4% of all households were made up of individuals, and 19.7% had someone living alone who was 65 years of age or older. The average household size was 2.14 and the average family size was 2.85.

In the town, the population was spread out, with 24.8% under the age of 18, 10.4% from 18 to 24, 25.6% from 25 to 44, 21.2% from 45 to 64, and 18.1% who were 65 years of age or older. The median age was 37 years. For every 100 females, there were 92.5 males. For every 100 females age 18 and over, there were 80.1 males.

The median income for a household in the town was $14,688, and the median income for a family was $21,705. Males had a median income of $16,912 versus $14,886 for females. The per capita income for the town was $10,275. About 26.5% of families and 34.5% of the population were below the poverty line, including 46.6% of those under the age of 18 and 37.8% of those 65 and older.

== Media ==
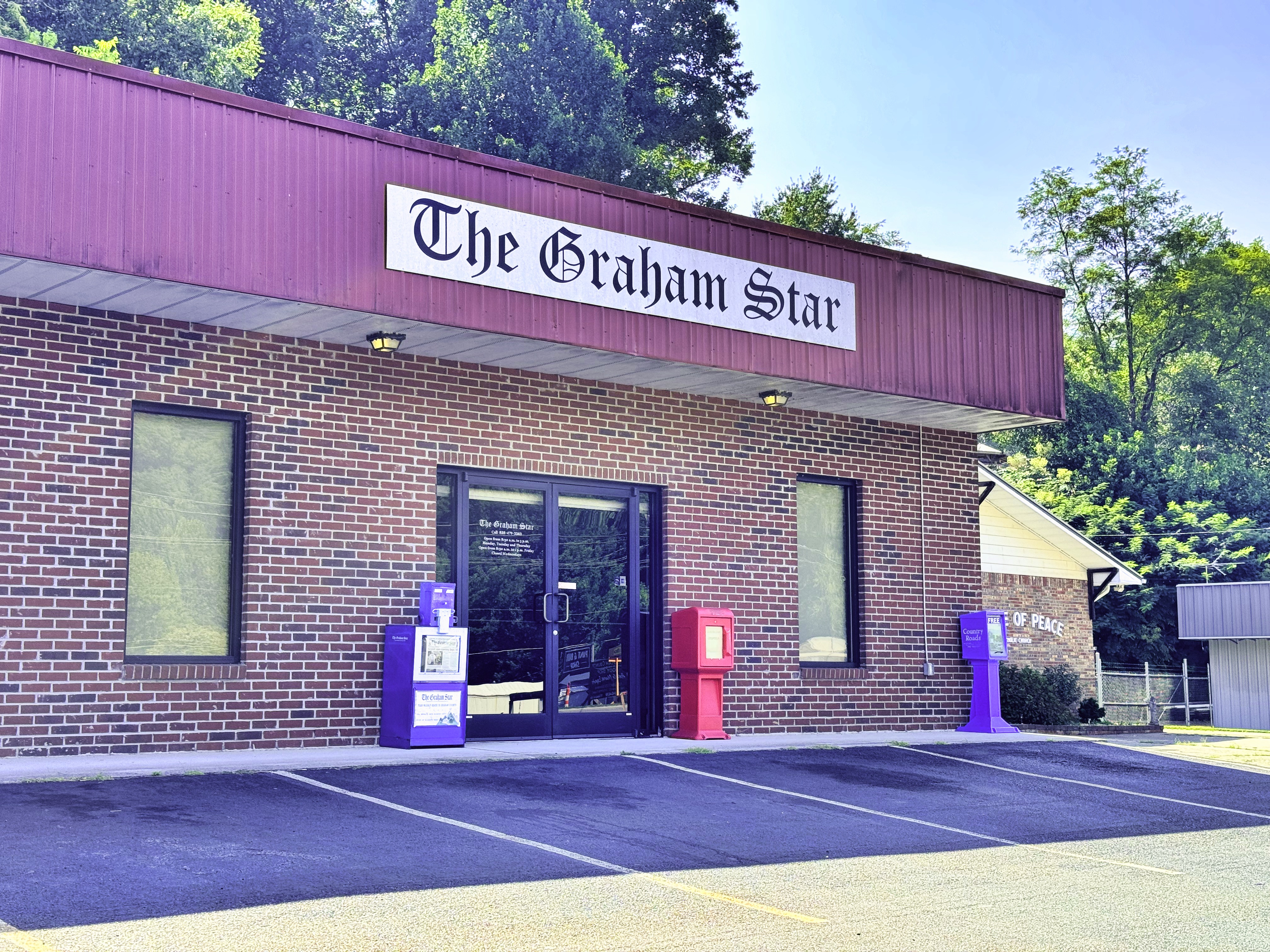
The Graham Star newspaper office at 720 Tallulah Road

The Graham Star newspaper has been published weekly in Robbinsville since 1955. It faced competition from the Graham Sentinel until the Sentinel closed in 2012.

== Education ==
Graham County Schools includes Robbinsville Elementary School, Robbinsville Middle School, and Robbinsville High School.

== Cultural references ==
- The silent film, Stark Love (2001), was filmed in and around Robbinsville and surrounding Graham County. Many of those who played in the movie were local residents.
- Author Peter Jenkins wrote about events in 1974 in Robbinsville in his book A Walk Across America. He left town after being threatened with lynching by state law enforcement because he was thought to be a hippie.

== Notable people ==
- Junaluska, Cherokee Indian leader
- Wade Crane, professional pool player, 8-Ball and 9-Ball champion
- Ethan Goodpaster, of indie alternative rock band Rainbow Kitten Surprise
- Jess Haney, of indie alternative rock band Rainbow Kitten Surprise
- Ronnie Milsap, country music singer and pianist
- Rodney Orr, NASCAR driver
- Tina Wesson, winner of Survivor: The Australian Outback
