= Bigg =

Bigg may refer to:

== Businesses ==
- bigg's, a hypermarket chain in Ohio and Kentucky
- Mr Bigg's, Nigerian fast food chain

== Other uses ==
- BiGG, a knowledge base for Metabolic network modelling
- Bigg City Port, location in the children's TV series Tugs
- Bigg (surname)
- Bigg Jus, American rapper

== See also ==
- Begg
- Biggs (disambiguation)
- Big (disambiguation)
- Bigg Mixx, a breakfast cereal
- Bigg's whale, a Transient killer whale
