= Virginia furniture =

Furniture originating from the U.S. state of Virginia

Virginia furniture is furniture that originates from the U.S. state of Virginia. Furniture was first produced in Virginia during the Colonial period and continued through the Industrial Revolution. Furniture production has decreased in recent times due to imported furniture, but Virginia is still home to a few large furniture companies.

== Colonial period ==
A recreated workshop in Colonial Williamsburg.

In colonial Virginia, there were at least six furniture makers. Anthony Hay made furniture in Colonial Williamsburg. As the colony grew, other furniture makers developed in Norfolk, Fredericksburg, Alexandria and Petersburg. In Fredericksburg alone, more than a dozen manufacturers made European-style furniture in facilities owned by cabinetmakers such as Robert and Alexander Walker, James Allen and Thomas Miller. Many of these early cabinetmakers also worked at house joinery.

== Nineteenth century ==
Scholars and Virginia historians have come to understand that in early colonial and Federal years, Virginia had a more vibrant furniture industry than first realized. Styles included Chippendale, Queen Anne and vernacular styles. As Virginia citizens emigrated west, Virginia stylists and furniture makers took their patterns and styles with them. Not all the styles mimicked the British; emigrants like the German Johannes Spitler brought their native painting and folk decorative styles to the Shenandoah Valley.

Some companies from the early 19th century survived. In 1830, E. A. Clore was founded; it is now one of the oldest companies in the United States and still makes furniture at its Madison County location.

In the 19th century, a typical small town like Waterford, Virginia, had a number of manufacturers; in Waterford's case, makers like John Mount, William T. Mount, and Lewis N. Hough.

== Twentieth century ==
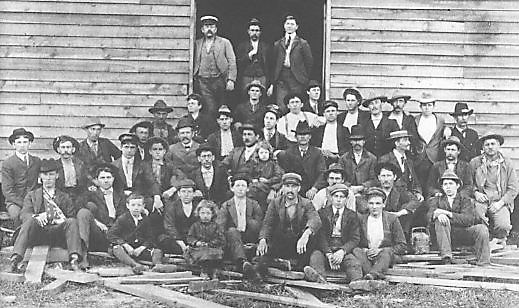
Early employees of Bassett Furniture Company, Bassett, Virginia, circa 1900

By the 20th century, the activities of groups like the Association for the Preservation of Virginia Antiquities, led to a renewed interest in colonial styles. Companies like Biggs Furniture grew from a small antiques shop in Richmond into a major reproductions manufacturer that came close to rivaling Ethan Allen. With the establishment of Colonial Williamsburg in the 1930s, the interest in colonial reproductions grew, though reproductions of the Williamsburg collection were made by the Kittinger Company of New York.

Through the 20th century, mass-marketed furniture prevailed, and companies like Stanley Furniture, Pulaski Furniture, Rowe Furniture and Bassett Furniture grew into national brands. They grew around the area of Martinsville, where they sometimes formed company towns. The height of this movement came when Thomas Bahnson Stanley, founder of Stanley Furniture, became Governor of Virginia in 1954. Many of these companies now show their wares in High Point, North Carolina, the American city most synonymous with furniture, located just south of Martinsville.

== Contemporary ==
Imports gained strength through the 1990s and early 21st century, and once-dominant Virginia companies have struggled to compete with imports. While not a descriptive adjective like Williamsburg, a Virginia style of decorating has permeated the world of interior design. Virginia natives like Nancy Lancaster, William Haines, Charlotte Moss and Bunny Williams have had influential roles in interior design using neo-traditional and modern approaches.

In recent years as imports have gained strength, companies like Kingsley Bate and Flexa have located manufacturing and/or distribution facilities in Virginia because of the state's easy access ports in Hampton Roads. In 2008, Swedwood Danville, a subsidiary of IKEA, opened a North American manufacturing plant in Cane Creek Center near Danville, Virginia, which employs 335 workers.
