= Peter Jenkins =

Peter Jenkins may refer to:

- Peter Jenkins (diplomat) (born 1950), British diplomat
- Peter Jenkins (journalist) (1934–1992), British journalist
- Peter Jenkins (politician) (1944–2021), Canadian politician
- Peter Jenkins (travel author) (born 1951), American travel author
