= Mr. Big =

Mr. Big may refer to:

== Entertainment ==
=== In film and literature ===
- Mister Big (James Bond), a villain in the novel and film Live and Let Die
- Mr Big, a 2008 book by Ed Vere
- Mister Big (1943 film), a 1943 musical
- Mr. Big (2007 film), a 2007 documentary

=== In television ===
- Mr. Big, a character on the 1970s TVOntario children's television series Math Patrol
- Mr. Big (TV series), a 1977 BBC TV sitcom written by and starring Peter Jones
- Mr. Big (Sex and the City), a character from the Sex and the City television series and movie
- Mr. Big, pseudonym used by Hank Hill in the King of the Hill episode "Soldier of Misfortune"
- Mr. Big, the boss of Fearless Leader, who is Boris and Natasha's boss, on the Rocky and Bullwinkle Show
- "Mr. Big" (Get Smart), an episode of the TV series Get Smart

=== In video games ===
- Mr. Big (Art of Fighting), a character originally from the Art of Fighting video game series
- Mr. Big, the main villain from the motion picture and video game Michael Jackson's Moonwalker
- Mr. Big, a villain from the video game Narc

== Music ==
- Mr. Big (American band), an American hard rock band
- Mr Big (British band), a British pop rock band
- Mr. Big (Mr. Big album), the debut album of the American band
- Mr. Big (Little Richard album)
- Mr. Big (Big Boy album), 1993
- "Mr. Big", a song by Free from their album Fire and Water, later covered by Mr. Big the American band

== Criminology ==
- Mr. Big, a nickname for the New Zealand heroin trafficker and murderer Terrance John Clark
- Mr. Big, nickname of English mobster and businessman Paul Massey
- Mr. Big, a nickname of American crime boss Arnold Rothstein
- Mr Big (criminology), a slang term for a highly ranked person within an organised crime organisation
- Mr. Big (police procedure), a Canadian method used by undercover police to obtain confessions from cold cases

== Other uses ==
- Mr. Big (chocolate bar), a brand of chocolate bar
- Mr Big, the name of the balloon involved in the 2012 Carterton hot air balloon crash in New Zealand

== See also ==
- Big (disambiguation)
- Mr Bigg's, a fast food chain in Ghana and Nigeria
- Ronald Isley (born 1941), American soul singer occasionally known as "Mr. Biggs"
