= Mount Airy Mantle and Table Company =

American furniture company

The Mount Airy Mantle and Table Company was founded in 1902 by George O. Graves, G.H. Williamson and Calvin Graves, Sr. in Mount Airy, North Carolina.

It merged with the National Furniture Company and was eventually purchased by Bassett Furniture.
