= John D. Bassett =

American industrialist (1866–1965)

John David Bassett, Sr.
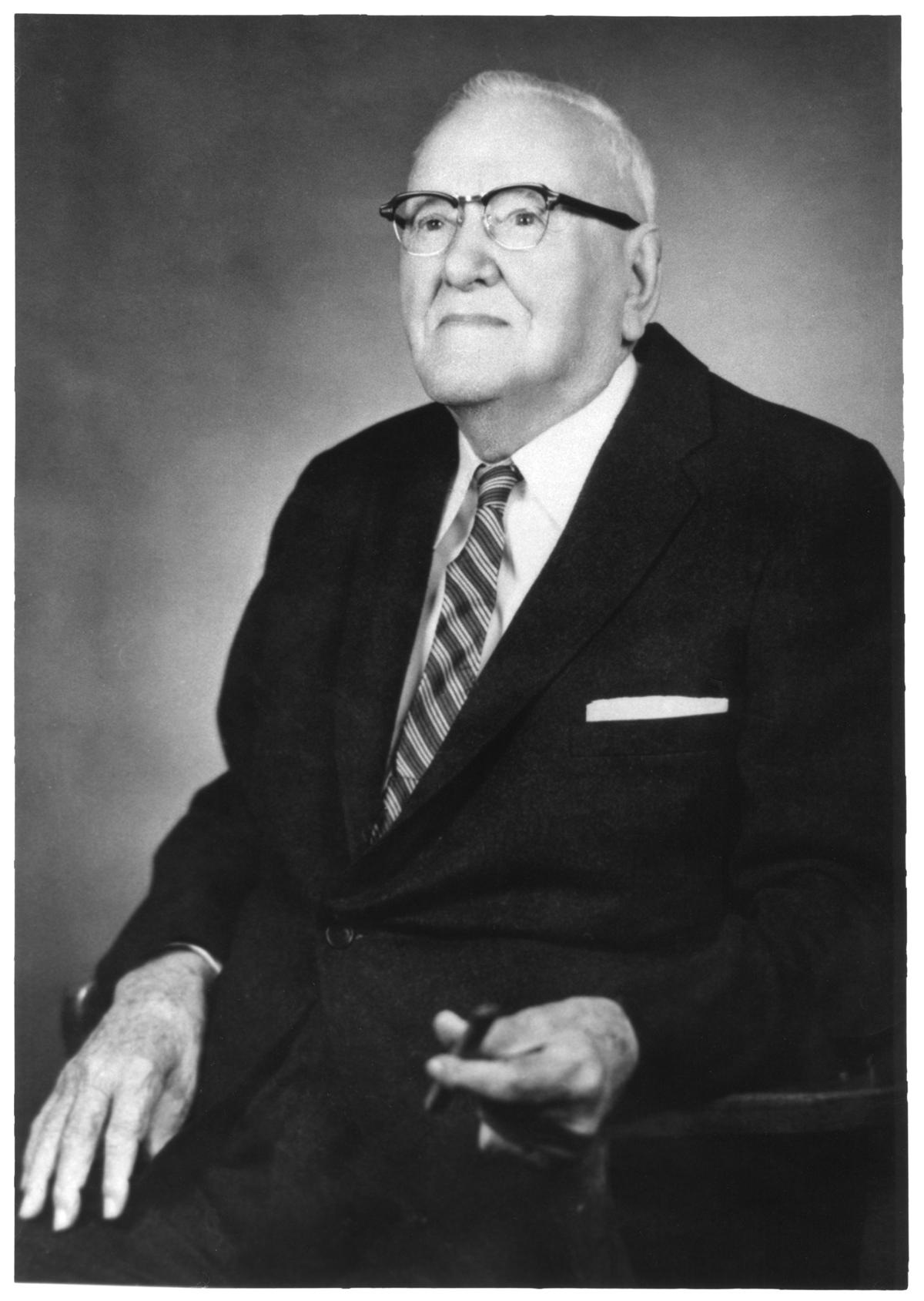
- Corporate photo, ca. 1960
- Born: July 14, 1866; Bassett, Virginia, U.S.
- Died: February 26, 1965 (aged 98); Bassett, Virginia, U.S.
- Resting place: Bassett, Virginia, U.S.
- Occupations: industrialist; capitalist; philanthropist
- Known for: Primary founder and leader of Bassett Furniture
- Title: President of Bassett Furniture (1902–1930)
- Political party: Republican
- Spouse: Pocahontas "Pokey" Hundley (m. 1893)
- Children: William McKinley Bassett, Blanche Estelle Bassett, Anne Pocahontas Bassett, John Douglas Bassett

Signature
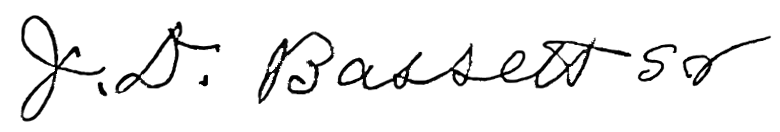

John David Bassett, Sr. (July 14, 1866 – February 26, 1965) was a noted American industrialist who formed the Bassett Furniture Company in 1902. During the late 1960s, the Bassett Furniture Industries, Inc., was the largest manufacturer of wooden furniture in the world, with sales of over $118 million in 1968.

== Early life ==
"Here this man of initiative and administrative talent was born July 14, 1866, a son of John H. and Nancy J. (Spencer) Bassett, the former of whom was born near Preston, Virginia in Henry County, and the latter in Patrick County, Virginia, both families having early been founded in Virginia." He was also the grandson of Alexander Hunter Bassett.

His father, John Henry Bassett, had lived as a simple farmer for most of his life. When the American Civil War broke out, John Henry was in the required age of service and joined in the effort in service with the Confederate States of America. After the war, John Henry Bassett continued his farming, and later John D. Bassett was born.

Among the foothills in that part of rural Virginia, John Bassett made a minimal existence as a farmer, working as a tobacco pinholder, store keeper, sawmill operator, and lumberman. His fortunes improved after he was able to convince the Roanoke Southern Railway to come through his family farm in 1889. With this opportunity, he and his family were able to become the sole suppliers of railroad ties for the company, which was leasing and developing lines for the Norfolk and Western Railway. The railway workers frequented his growing general store, and as he gained clout he was able to convince Norfolk and Western Railway to construct a train station near the general store. This was soon followed by a hotel, a theater, and numerous other businesses.

He married Pocahontas "Pokey" Hundley (November 21, 1862 - January 11, 1953), and together they had four children: William McKinley Bassett (1894-1960) married Lela Gladys Clark and built Eltham Manor in 1936; Blanche E. Bassett, who married Taylor George Vaughan; Ann Pocahontas Bassett married Thomas B. Stanley; John Douglas Bassett (1901-1966).

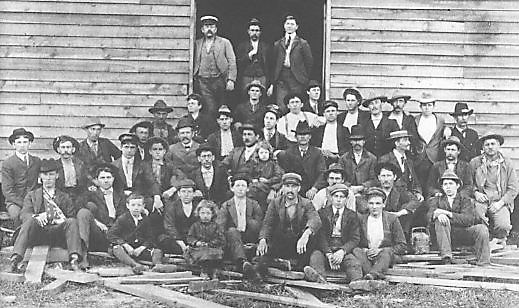
Employees of Bassett Furniture circa 1900

At the age of 35, John D. Bassett and his brothers, Samuel Henry Bassett and Charles Columbus Bassett, and his brother-in-law, Reed Lewis Stone, along with the capital funds of $11,000, organized the Bassett Furniture Company.

John D. Bassett was an early adopter of Florida as a vacation resort, and would retreat there during the fall and winter months. In 1921, he partnered with Robert Osborne and took over the Hartsfield Wholesale Grocer company in West Palm Beach, Florida. The new company, with Bassett's brother C. C. as secretary, was named the Hartsfield-Osborne-Bassett Wholesale Grocery Company, which remained in operation for several years.

He helped found and startup Bassett Mirror Company, Hooker Furniture, Stanley Furniture, and Vaughan-Bassett Furniture. All of these companies were operated by people who were related to John D. Bassett in some way.

== Politics ==
John D. Bassett was very active in county level politics. He threw his support behind favored local officials, and also helped promote picks for postmaster. He strongly believed in the importance of good roads and infrastructure for economic growth. In the 1920's, Bassett did toy with more prominent roles in state-level politics.

While southwestern Virginia voted strongly Democratic in the early 20th century, John D. Bassett supported the Republican ticket. "In an effort to advance its members' socioeconomic and ethnic views, the Ku Klux Klan turned to politics. In 1925, in addition to supporting a bill that would forbid the teaching of evolution in Virginia schools, the Virginia Klan campaigned against John M. Purcell, the incumbent Democratic state treasurer and a Roman Catholic. Klan members threw their support behind Purcell's Republican opponent, John David Bassett, whom they styled "the 100% candidate."

Bassett lost the election, but performed surprisingly well in a state controlled by a very strong Democratic machine." The Klan normally supported the Democratic ticket, but they refused Purcell's candidacy simply because he was Catholic. Bassett never acknowledged any public support for the Ku Klux Klan.

== Philanthropy ==
John D. Bassett supported many philanthropic causes. He was a strong supporter of the Grundy Mountain Mission School and the Blue Ridge Mountain Mission School. Through his corporation, he encouraged and supported community beautification, and a ballfield. He also helped fund local fire, rescue, and law enforcement services and equipment.

== Death ==
John D. Bassett died on February 26, 1965.

== Legacy ==
Bassett Furniture was conceived by John D. Bassett in 1902, who remained its president until 1930.

The town of Bassett, Virginia, is named after his family. When asked by the postal service what the name of the town should be, John D. Bassett offered up the original name of "Bassetts", and the "s" was dropped later.

The John D. Bassett High School was named in his honor.

== Bibliography ==
- American Furniture Manufacturers Association. American Furniture Hall of Fame Induction Banquet. High Point, N.C.: American Furniture Manufacturers, 1997. Notes: The induction of new members to the American Furniture Hall of Fame with Mary McKenzie Henkel of Winchester, Va. being among the inductees. Includes a brief overview of the current members including John D. Bassett. https://www.worldcat.org/oclc/44273670
- Bassett, Mary Henrian. The Bassett Family in Henry County, Virginia, with Stories, Mainly of the Woodson Bassett Branch. Martinsville, Va: Bassett, 1976. https://www.worldcat.org/oclc/2856828
- John D. Bassett: Brief Sketch of Life of Republican Candidate for State Treasurer As Known to His Home People. Martinsville, Va: Bulletin Print, 1925. http://www.worldcat.org/oclc/24995500
- "Byrd has over 50,000 Majority For Governor". Rockbridge, Va: Virginia Chronicle Digital, 1925. https://virginiachronicle.com/?a=d&d=RCN19251105.1.2
- Macy, Beth. Factory man: how one furniture maker battled offshoring, stayed local—and helped save an American town. 2014. http://www.worldcat.org/oclc/862790783
