= Robbinsville High School =

Robbinsville High School may refer to:

- Robbinsville High School (New Jersey), in Robbinsville Township, Mercer County, New Jersey
- Robbinsville High School (North Carolina), in Graham County, North Carolina
