= Big =

Big or BIG may refer to:

- Big, of great size or degree

== Film, television, and literature ==
- Big (film), a 1988 fantasy-comedy film starring Tom Hanks
- Big, a 2023 Taiwanese children's film starring Van Fan and Chie Tanaka
- Big!, a Discovery Channel television show
- Big (picture book), 2023 American children's book by Vashti Harrison
- Richard Hammond's Big, a television show presented by Richard Hammond
- Big (TV series), a 2012 South Korean TV series
- "Big" (My Hero), a 2003 television episode
- Banana Island Ghost, a 2017 fantasy action comedy film

== Media ==
- The Big Channel, a defunct Argentine children's television channel
- Big Big Channel, a Hong Kong online video platform

== Music ==
- Big: the musical, a 1996 musical based on the film
- Big Records, a record label
- Big! (Betty Who album)
- Big (album), a 2007 album by Macy Gray
- "Big" (Brassmunk song)
- "Big" (Dead Letter Circus song)
- "Big" (Fontaines D.C. song)
- "Big" (Juice Wrld song)
- "Big" (Sneaky Sound System song)
- "Big" (Rita Ora and Imanbek song)
- "Big" (Young M.A song)
- "Big", a 1990 song by New Fast Automatic Daffodils
- "Big", a 2021 song by Jade Eagleson from Honkytonk Revival
- "BIG", a 2019 song by Psapp from Tourists
- "B.I.G.", a 2015 song by X Ambassadors from VHS
- "B.I.G.", a 2025 song by Forrest Frank from Child of God II
- The Notorious B.I.G., an American rapper
- B.I.G (band), a South Korean boy band

== Places ==
- Big River (disambiguation), various rivers (and other things)
- Big Island (disambiguation), various islands (and other things)

== Transportation ==
- Allen Army Airfield (IATA code), Alaska, US
- Billingshurst railway station (National Rail station code), West Sussex, England
- BIG, a VOR navigational beacon at London Biggin Hill Airport

== Organizations ==
- Badan Informasi Geospasial, the national mapping agency of Indonesia
- Beijing Institute of Genomics, a Chinese institute for genetic research
- Big Ten Conference, an American college sports conference which uses the singular word "B1G" (the numeral "1" replacing the letter "I") within their logo
- Bjarke Ingels Group, a Danish architecture firm
- Bundesimmobiliengesellschaft, an Austrian quasi-governmental company
- Breast International Group, for breast cancer research

== Fictional characters ==
- Big the Cat, in the Sonic the Hedgehog game universe
- Big, a Buddhist monk in the 2003 film Running on Karma
- Big, in The Perhapanauts comic book series
- Big, in Big & Small children's TV Series
- Big (character), from Sex and the City

== Other uses ==
- Kunimaipa language (ISO 639-3 code: big), of Papua New Guinea
- Basic income grant
  - BIG Namibia, the basic income grant pilot project at Omitara, Namibia
- Operation Big, an Allied task force assigned to obtain German nuclear secrets during the final days of World War II
- A nickname of Fred T. Long (1896–1966), American Negro league baseball player and college football coach
- <big></big>, an HTML element
- BIG, a type of Non-RAID drive architectures used to concatenate multiple disks to appear as a single big disk
- Business is a Game, a type of business war games
- The Bigs, 2007 video game
- Big (wine), a term in wine tasting
- Center (basketball), a position in basketball also referred to as the "big"

== See also ==
- Mr. Big (disambiguation)
- The Big Show (disambiguation)
- Big cat (disambiguation)
