= Wade Crane =

American pool player (born 1944)

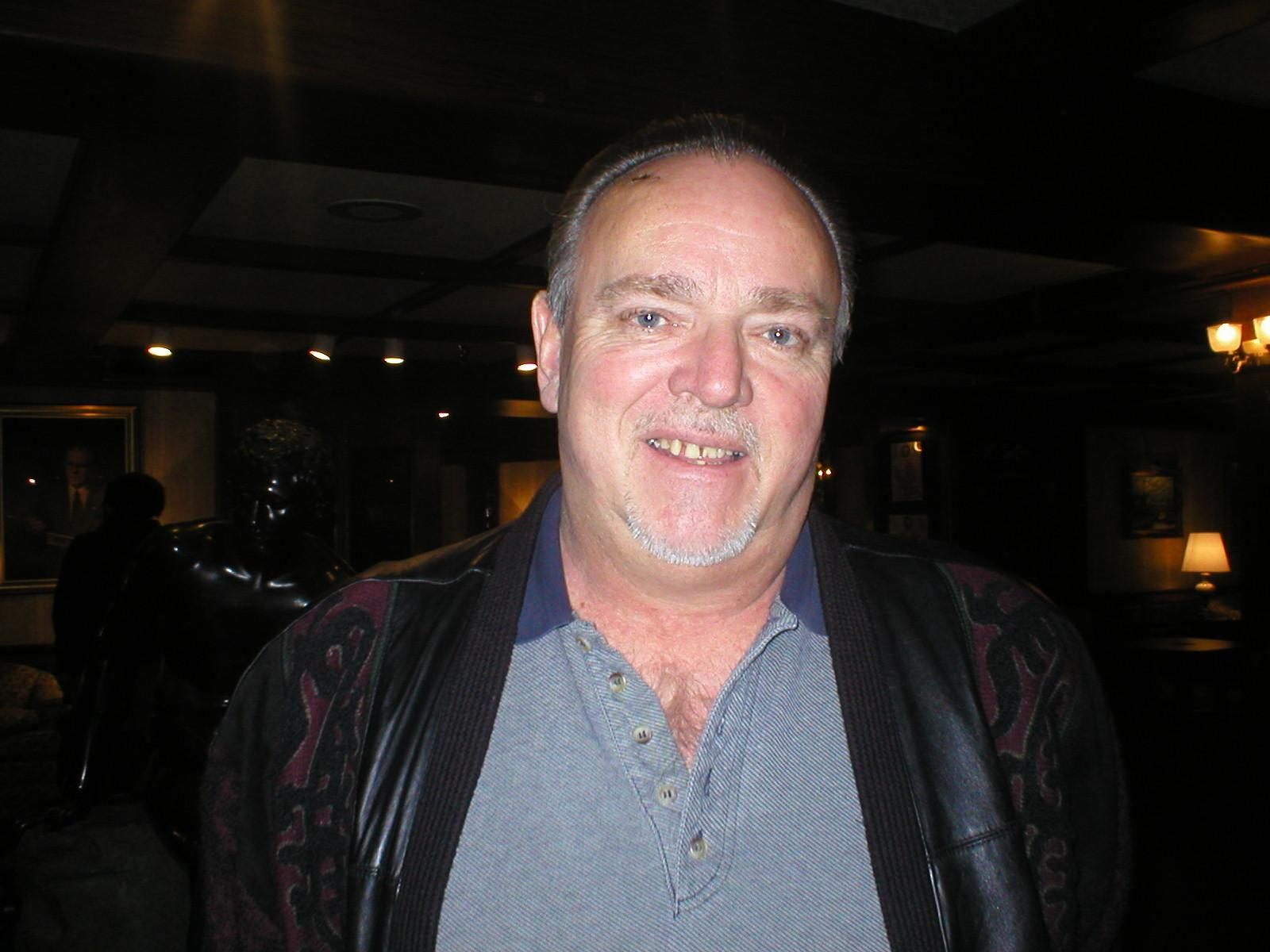
- Wade Crane at 2003 Derby City Classic in Louisville, Kentucky

Personal information
- Nickname: "Boom-Boom"
- Born: 20 February 1944 Robbinsville, North Carolina, U.S.
- Died: 26 December 2010 (aged 66) Knoxville, Tennessee, U.S.

Pool career
- Country: United States

Wade Arlyn Crane (February 20, 1944 – December 26, 2010) was an American professional pool player, nicknamed "Boom-Boom" because of the cannonball sound that emanated from his powerful break. Crane also played under the alias of "Billy Johnson."

A former 9-Ball champion, Crane was a dominant player in the mid-1980s. He was voted by his peers to have the best 9-ball break in history at the time.

He was no relation to Irving Crane, another great American pool player.

== Early Days ==
Wade Arlyn Crane grew up in Robbinsville, North Carolina, a small town with a population of 700 located in the westernmost part of North Carolina in the Great Smoky Mountains. He was the youngest of four children. His father was killed in an automobile accident shortly after he was born, which necessitated him being raised by his grandmother.

Coming from a modest background, he sought employment at the age of 12 and landed a job in a small five-table pool room named Cooper's. It was here where he initially developed his passion for playing pool. He did odd jobs, keeping the pool room clean, sweeping floors, and even had a shoe shine stand. The owner would direct the customers to play pool with young Wade if the pool room was empty. Crane was a self-taught pool player. He soon began to enjoy the competitive spirit. In high school, he was a fullback on the Robbinsville football team, and made it to the state playoffs two years straight.

After high school, Crane decided to leave Robbinsville and live with his older brother in Chicago, where he got a job at Brach's Confections, a candy company. He worked there for three years, earning $150 a week, and initially had little interest in playing pool. Sometimes, though, his older brother, Bill, would call on Wade to meet him at the local pool hall on Cicero Avenue. Bill would make bad games and find himself overmatched. He would then call on his little brother, Wade, to bail him by having him play the same pool players that he lost to. Thereafter, Bill began to match up Wade with the local players. At this time, both Bill and Wade became active in Chicago's pool scene. Soon Wade was competing at Bensinger's pool room in Chicago against tough opponents in the area, like Mexican Johnny, John Abruzzo, and George Walker.

In 1965, Crane was making more money playing pool than working at Brach's Confections, so he decided to leave the Windy City and move to Atlanta, Georgia. It was at this time that he assumed the alias of "Billy Johnson," a moniker he would hang onto for 20 more years. He changed his name because he wanted to engage in money matches down South and feared some might recognize the name "Wade Crane" from his earlier days of gambling throughout that region.

"While me and a friend were driving along the interstate to this pool room, we passed a Howard Johnson's," said Crane. He decided to just add on "Johnson" to "Bill" and came up with the road name of "Billy Johnson." It was a good name for him because he had been using his brother's fake ID to get into the Chicago taverns and pool rooms, so he was used to answering to "Bill."

In the early 1970s, Crane returned to North Carolina and opened his own pool room in Asheville, which was an attraction for many of the top players in the country, i.e., Buddy Hall, Jim Rempe, Mike Sigel, and Allen Hopkins. Now the 25-year-old Crane was ranked second to Luther Lassiter, who was the 9-Ball Champion of the South.

The money matches began to dwindle, so he decided to move to Knoxville, Tennessee, for a change. It is here where he met his third wife, Linda, who was a waitress at a steak and seafood restaurant. They dated for 18 months before he proposed. After they were married, the couple moved back to Crane's hometown of Robbinsville, where he operated a small video arcade and quit playing pool. It was three and a half years before his wife saw him shoot a game of pool.

In 1983, pool became attractive to Crane once more, due to the large money payouts in pocket billiard competitions. Crane returned to the pool scene, but this time, he would be shooting pool in a new environment, competing in short race-type matches on pristine equipment at tournament venues instead of gambling long ahead sets on inferior equipment in various pool rooms around the country.

== Professional career ==
At the height of Crane's game in June 1985, he scored a perfect Accu-Stats score in the second set of the finals, in a race to 7 games against Buddy Hall at the Resorts International Casino in Atlantic City, New Jersey, in the Resorts International Last Call For 9-Ball, a feat that to this day has never been achieved by any other competitor in a pool tournament during a final match. During one match, he ran seven consecutive racks against Hall. He was the top money winner of major professional pool tournaments in 1985.

Crane went undefeated at the 1985 Red's Open 9-Ball Championship in Houston, Texas, until he met Efren Reyes in the finals, who was at this time shooting pool under an alias of "Cesar Morales." The irony, however, was that Crane happened to be the only other competitor in the 108-player event that also used an alias, "Billy Johnson," when he took second-place honors. The final score was 13 to 9. This was the first tournament that a then-unknown Efren Reyes, a pool champion from the Republic of the Philippines, competed in on American soil.

Pool & Billiards Magazine named Wade Crane in 1985 as the Pool & Billiard Magazine's All Star Player of the Year.

At the 1987 Steve Gumphreys Memorial 9-Ball Open tournament held in Jackson, Mississippi, Crane defeated Earl Strickland twice in the finals of a double-elimination format event to win the title.

Crane was heralded as a legend by pool industry members. He was deemed as a courteous pool competitor, with a sense of humor that was enjoyed by his peers, according to Nick Varner and Johnny Archer, both Billiard Congress of America Hall of Fame Inductees.

As owner of Crane's Billiard Academy, he gave instructions to beginners, amateur players, as well as male and female professional pool competitors.

For 15 years, he was an instructional journalist for Pool & Billiards Magazine, providing guidance on shot selection and other pool-related strategies in his monthly article entitled "Crane's Winning Way."

A recognition ceremony to commemorate Crane's legacy of pool in action was held at the 7th Annual One-Pocket Hall of Fame dinner on January 25, 2011, at the 2011 Derby City Classic. Wade Crane was given the Lifetime Pool in Action Award at the One Pocket Hall of Fame banquet.

== Death ==
At 9:30 a.m. on Sunday, December 26, 2010, Crane was killed in an automobile accident in Knoxville, Tennessee, when his 2000 Volkswagen crossed three lanes of traffic and struck a retaining wall. No other vehicle was involved in the accident. It is believed that Crane suffered from an undiagnosed medical condition before the crash. He was pronounced dead at the University of Tennessee Hospital.

== Filmography ==
Wade Crane produced a pool instructional videotape entitled "Learn to Play the Winning Way."

Accu-Stats Video Productions filmed several live matches of Wade Crane in pocket billiards competitions from 1992 to 2001.

== Titles ==
- 1972 Greater Phoenix 9-Ball Open
- 1972 Golden 8-Ball Billiards
- 1980 Greensboro 9-Ball Open
- 1985 Resorts International Last Call For 9-Ball
- 1985 Florida State 9-Ball Open
- 1985 Busch Open 9-Ball Championship
- 1985 National Billiard News Player of the Year
- 1986 Shenandoah 9-Ball Open
- 1987 Steve Gumphreys Memorial 9-Ball Open
- 1988 King of the Rings 8-Ball
- 1991 Southeastern 9-Ball Tournament
- 1993 Shooters Billiards One Pocket
- 2010 Lifetime Pool in Action Award
