= Edward F. Reilly Jr. =

American politician

Member of the Kansas Senate from the 3rd district
- In office 1969–1992
- Succeeded by: Carolyn Tillotson

Member of the Kansas Senate from the 7th district
- In office 1965–1968

Member of the Kansas House of Representatives from the 4th district
- In office 1964–1964
- Preceded by: Robert Behee

Personal details
- Born: March 24, 1937 (age 89) Leavenworth, Kansas
- Party: Republican
- Education: University of Kansas (B.S. in political science)

Edward F. Reilly Jr. (born March 24, 1937) is an American former politician from the state of Kansas. He served in the Kansas state legislature for 29 years, and was a leader in policy on prisons and corrections.

Reilly was born in Leavenworth, Kansas, the same city he would go on to represent in the Kansas Senate. He attended the University of Kansas and received a bachelor's degree in political science, graduating in 1961; after graduation, he joined his family's business and spent his professional career in banking, real estate and insurance.

Reilly originally joined the state legislature when he was appointed to the Kansas House of Representatives in 1964, to fill a seat left vacant by the resignation of Robert Behee. He spent less than a year in the Kansas House, successfully running for the Kansas State Senate in the 1964 elections. He served for one term in the 7th district before switching to the 3rd district in the 1968 elections, where he served until his retirement from the Senate in 1992.

During his time in the legislature, Reilly chaired the Committee on Federal and State Affairs, which often dealt with issues involving corrections and the penal system. After his retirement from the Kansas Senate, Reilly was appointed to the United States Parole Commission, serving as chairman from August 1992 to February 1997 and again in 2001.

Reilly also took an interest in U.S. relations with Ireland and the Northern Ireland conflict. In 1982, Bob Dole unsuccessfully submitted Reilly for the role of U.S. ambassador to Ireland. He visited Ireland several times, and in February 2020 was appointed as a U.S. Observer to the International Fund for Ireland by the Trump administration.
