= Stanley Furniture =

American furniture manufacturer

- Type: Privately held company
- Industry: Furniture manufacturing
- Founded: April 1924; 102 years ago
- Founder: Thomas Bahnson Stanley
- Headquarters: High Point, North Carolina
- Website: stanleyfurniture.com

Stanley Furniture is an American furniture manufacturer based in High Point, North Carolina, United States.

== History ==
Stanley Furniture was founded in April 1924 by Thomas Bahnson Stanley, who later became Governor of Virginia. Stanley learned the furniture business from his father-in-law, John D. Bassett, who had founded and owned Bassett Furniture in Bassett, Virginia. Stanley located his new company near Bassett, and the community it was in was soon named Stanleytown.

=== Early years ===
In early 1924, Thomas B. Stanley resigned from his position at Basset Furniture in order to start his own company, Stanley Furniture. He founded the company in his home county of Henry County, Virginia and brought on his nephew, Fred A. Stanley, and his brother, John W. Stanley, as some of the company's first employees. While building the first Stanley Furniture factory, Stanley decided to build a company town along with it. With that plan, Stanleytown, Virginia was developed. Over 100 homes were built to house the new factory's workers, and new roadways were paved. Rent for the new homes was $4-$5 per month.

Stanley Furniture's first furniture collection, a dining room suite, debuted in 1925 and consisted of a buffet, china closet, server, table and chairs. The success of this first collection ushered in a time of prosperity for the company. Profits steadily rose from 1925 through 1928, and in 1929 the company decided to double its production capacity to meet growing demands.

When the Wall Street crash of 1929 hit, Stanley Furniture was in debt from the recent expansion. In order to keep the company alive, the 400 Stanley employees accepted a pay cut and agreed to work ten hours of time for nine hours of pay. Stanley himself accepted a pay cut of 125%. To compensate for this lack of income, Stanley lowered rents by 20% in Stanleytown. Due to these changes, the company was able to operate through the Great Depression and maintain a narrow profit margin.

=== 1930s-1950s ===
Following the Great Depression, Stanley Furniture experienced continued growth. The company's growth through the 30s, 40s and 50s led to the decision to complete a second expansion. This time around, the goal of the expansion was not only to meet new demands, but also to modernize the production facilities by increasing automation in the factory. The expansion cost a total of $4 million and was completed in 1957.

It was also during this time period that the company's founder, Thomas B. Stanley, was elected to serve as Governor of Virginia, an office he held from 1954 to 1958.

=== 1960s-1980s ===
The Mead Corporation purchased Stanley Furniture in 1969 and maintained ownership of the company for 10 years. In 1979, Stanley Furniture became part of several leveraged buyouts until, finally, in the late 1980s, Stanley Furniture reemerged as a wholly owned, private entity.

In 1988, Albert Prillaman was named chairman, CEO and president of Stanley Furniture.

=== 1990s-early 2000s ===
In 1994, Stanley entered into the upholstered furniture business after focusing on non-upholstered, wood residential furniture for most of its sixty-year history. The company came out with a Norman Rockwell-inspired collection during this period that was well received. The collection incorporated 21 of Rockwell's magazine covers into the pieces themselves and sold not just the furniture but also the fabric from the collection for the first time in the company's history.

Despite the success of the Rockwell collection, Stanley Furniture phased out their upholstered furniture business in 1998 and refocused on wood furniture. With its focus solely on wood furniture, Stanley opened a new, 300,000-square-foot facility in Martinsville, Virginia in March 2000.

In late 2003, Stanley Furniture joined Vaughan-Bassett Furniture, Bassett Furniture and 20 other furniture manufacturers in filing an anti-dumping petition with the U.S. Government. The petition was intended to aid the companies in collecting duties against Chinese furniture manufacturers they suspected were selling products in the U.S. for less than fair value. Through a series of investigations, the Department of Commerce and the U.S. International Trade Commission determined that the claims were valid under the Continued Dumping and Subsidy Offset Act of 2000, and all 23 U.S.-based furniture manufacturers received monetary compensation funded by duties placed on Chinese furniture manufacturers. Stanley received the largest disbursement.

== Recent history ==
In 2009, Stanley announced that the manufacturing of its "Young America" line of furniture would be moved to the United States, primarily its North Carolina and Virginia factories. This same year, R. Glenn Prillaman took the reins as president and CEO of the company.

In 2010, the firm announced that it would close its Stanleytown manufacturing operation, laying off 530 workers and converting the former factory into a warehouse and distribution center. Over the next few years, this facility was phased out as well and was soon shuttered. In 2012, Stanley announced it was relocating its headquarters to High Point, NC.

In April 2014, the company announced it would close its Robbinsville, North Carolina plant, laying off 400 workers; the closure was in spite of the $9 million it had recently invested in the plant when the company had moved manufacturing of its "Young America" furniture line from China to Robbinsville.

In November 2017, after years of struggling to return to profitability, Stanley Furniture agreed to be sold to Churchill Downs, LLC, a private Vietnamese industry group. Shortly after the sale was announced, Glenn Prillaman resigned from his role as CEO and President. Prillaman was replaced on an interim basis by Matt Smith, managing director of the Finley Group. In March 2018, the sale to Churchill Downs, LLC was finalized making Walter Blocker the company's new owner. Blocker serves as chairman of the Vietnam Trade Alliance based in Ho Chi Minh City, Vietnam.

Following completion of the sale, Richard Ledger was named as CEO and Adam Tilley was named as president. Both Ledger and Tilley previously worked for Stanley as VP of Operations and VP of Product, respectively.

As of mid 2021, Stanley Asset Holding Ltd, took over ownership of the Stanley furniture brands as well as the Young America brand, leading the marketing of the brands as they venture into their 2nd century of furniture craftmanship.
