= Graham County Schools =

School district in North Carolina, United States

Location
- Graham County, North Carolina United States

District information
- Type: Public
- Grades: PK–12
- Superintendent: Robert Moody
- Schools: 3
- Budget: $16,630,000
- NCES District ID: 3701770

Students and staff
- Students: 1,141
- Teachers: 92 (on FTE basis)
- Staff: 106 (on FTE basis)
- Student–teacher ratio: 12.38:1

Other information
- Website: www.graham.k12.nc.us

Graham County Schools is a PK–12 graded school district serving Graham County, North Carolina, United States. Its three schools serve 1,141 students as of 2023.

As of 2023, the school district's annual budget is $16.63 million, or $14,861 per student.

== History ==
From 2007 through 2009, the school district tried to establish random drug testing for teachers in the school system. The North Carolina Association of Educators filed a lawsuit to prevent the testing. A lower court upheld the district's policy, but an appeals court struck down the ruling. Other states and school districts had similar suits in the courts and were watching the court's ruling. The school system decided not to pursue any higher appeals or challenges. In 2026, Graham County Schools broke ground on a new Robbinsville Elementary School.

== Student demographics ==
As of the 2023 school year, Graham County Schools had a total population of 1,141 students and 92.15 teachers on a (FTE) basis. This produced a student-teacher ratio of 12.38:1. For the 2010–11 school year, out of the student total, the gender ratio was 52% male to 48% female. The demographic group makeup was: White, 84%; American Indian, 13%; Hispanic, 2%; Black, 0%; and Asian/Pacific Islander, 0% (two or more races: 1%). For the same school year, 63.81% of the students received free and reduced-cost lunches.

== Governance ==
The primary governing body of Graham County Schools follows a council–manager government format with a five-member Board of Education appointing a superintendent to run the day-to-day operations of the system. The school system currently resides in the North Carolina State Board of Education's Eighth District.

=== Board of education ===
The five members of the Board of Education meet on the first Tuesday of each month. The current members of the board are: Rodney Nelson (Chair), Chip Carringer (Vice-Chair), Pam Knott, Andy Lynn, and Jonathan Allison.

=== Superintendent ===
The current superintendent of the system is Robert Moody.

== Member schools ==
Graham County Schools has three schools ranging from pre-kindergarten to twelfth grade: one high school, one middle school, and one elementary school. They are all located in Robbinsville, North Carolina.

- Robbinsville High School, grades 9–12
- Robbinsville Middle School, grades 7–8
- Robbinsville Elementary School, grades PK–6

Robbinsville's elementary and high schools received "C" performance grades from the N.C. Department of Public Instruction in 2024. Robbinsville Middle received an "F" grade.

== See also ==
- List of school districts in North Carolina
