= Magic Kids (TV channel) =

Latin cable TV channel

- Magic Kids's last logo, used between 2001-2006.
- Country: Argentina
- Broadcast area: Latin America
- Headquarters: Ángel Carranza Nº 1700 (Palermo, Buenos Aires, Argentina)

Programming
- Picture format: 576i/480i SDTV

Ownership
- Owner: Pramer

History
- Launched: January 12, 1995
- Closed: May 26, 2006
- Replaced by: Vidma Familia

Magic Kids was a Latin American cable channel which aired cartoons, anime and live shows aimed at kids and young teens. The channel was founded on January 12, 1995, and went defunct on May 24, 2006.

Widely regarded as one of the harbingers of a renewed interest for Japanese animation in Latin America during the 1990s, at its height the network had a variety of merchandise including a brand of soft drinks, toys and, the monthly Magic Kids Magazine.

== History ==
The history of Magic Kids dates back to the end of 1994, when Horacio Levin, owner of Promofilm, through his manager Damián Kirzner decided to create a children's channel. In an agreement with Pramer, they contacted Jorge Contreras, a man with extensive experience in documentary and journalistic television but without any experience in children's entertainment, to take charge of the programming management of The Big Channel and Roxana Pulido, with extensive experience in documentaries and the advertising world who promotes the production task with the collaboration of Lionel Diacovetsky and the channel's communication.

Originally conceived a "The Big Channel", the idea was to create a channel aimed at very young kids as way to market Pramer's toy-lines.

After Cartan went bankrupt and The Big Channel temporarily went off the air in January 1995, Pramer and Cablevisión (which belonged to Eduardo Eurnekian) decided to create a new channel similar to The Big Channel, called Magic Kids (originally known as Cablevisión Members Club). Thus Magic Kids began its broadcasts on January 12, 1995, with a launch party at Sheraton Hotel.

The channel was later re-branded as Magic Kids'. At first it survived thanks by airing American series such as Power Rangers, X-Men and Spider-Man but later on shifted to Japanese anime series, as it was cheaper to license and would differentiate them from other American channels like Cartoon Network and Nickelodeon.

As the network grew it also started creating some original content, starting with the interactive game show A Jugar con Hugo, which premiered in 1996 and stayed until the closure of the channel. Afterwards came Nivel X, a weekly show based around video-game culture, hosted by Lionel Campoy and Natalia Dim and El Club del Ánime, hosted at first by Leandro Oberto and later on by Mariela Carril.

At first, the channel was only available in Argentina, but soon, the channel started expanding to other countries. In Chile, regional cable operators like TV Cable Intercom started broadcasting the channel in 1995. However the push to expand was hasty, and Magic Kids failed to secure the rights to its most popular series outside Argentina. Its pan-regional service launched on September 1, 2001. Most of its roster was replaced with much older less popular series that were more affordable. Due to the 2001 Argentine crisis, it stopped broadcasting anime and began to lose its edge over their competitors. In early 2006, they stopped producing their own series, and in May of the same year, the signal finally went off the air alongside Plus Satelital as the company began to focus on brands with more international and regional value.

== See also ==
- Locomotion (TV channel)
- The Big Channel
