= Carolyn Tillotson =

American politician

Member of the Kansas Senate from the 3rd district
- In office 1997–2000
- Preceded by: Edward F. Reilly Jr.
- Succeeded by: Donald Biggs

Personal details
- Born: Carolyn Campbell; May 3, 1938 (age 88) Little Rock, Arkansas
- Party: Republican
- Children: Charles Tillotson

Carolyn Tillotson (born May 3, 1938) is an American former politician who served in the Kansas State Senate for one term from 1993 to 1996.
