= Donald Biggs =

American politician (1930–2024)

Member of the Kansas Senate from the 3rd district
- In office 1997–2001
- Preceded by: Carolyn Tillotson
- Succeeded by: Bob Lyon

Personal details
- Born: February 19, 1930 Kansas, U.S.
- Died: December 30, 2024 (aged 94) Prairie Village, Kansas, U.S.
- Party: Democratic

Donald E. Biggs (February 19, 1930 – December 30, 2024) was an American politician who served in the Kansas State Senate for one term from 1997 to 2001. Biggs died in Prairie Village, Kansas on December 30, 2024, at the age of 94.
