= Biggs, Kentucky =

Unincorporated community in Kentucky, United States

Biggs
- Unincorporated community
- Location within the state of Kentucky Biggs (the United States)
- Coordinates: 37°25′14″N 82°16′14″W
- Country: United States
- State: Kentucky
- County: Pike
- Named for: Richard Biggs
- Elevation: 837 ft (255 m)
- Time zone: UTC-5 (Eastern (EST))
  - Summer (DST): UTC-4 (EDT)
- GNIS feature ID: 507510

Biggs is an unincorporated community in Pike County, Kentucky, United States.
