= Bigg (surname) =

Bigg is an English surname. Notable people with the surname include:

- Henry Bigg (1690–1740), English academic administrator
- Michael Bigg (1939–1990), Canadian marine biologist
- John Stanyan Bigg (1828–1865), English poet
- Henry Bigg, character in the children's novel series The Littles
