= Peter Jenkins (diplomat) =

British diplomat

Peter Jenkins is a former British diplomat.

== Early career ==
Born in 1950 in Buckinghamshire, England. Education: Downside School, Somerset; Corpus Christi College, University of Cambridge (Classical Philosophy, M.A.); Graduate School of Arts and Sciences, Harvard University (as a Harkness Fellow). His 33-year diplomatic career took him to Vienna (twice), Washington, D.C., Paris, Brasília and Geneva.

In Washington, he was Private Secretary to two Ambassadors during an eventful period in transatlantic and East/West relations, as well as the Falklands War (1982–84). During two spells in the FCO between 1978 and 1987. he had responsibility for aspects of UK relations with Brazil and the Andean countries, and for certain Diplomatic Service assignments below the rank of Counsellor. In Paris, he dealt with issues arising from the creation of a European single market and worked on Franco-British energy ties.

After a spell in Brasilia, where he contributed to strengthening Anglo-Brazilian political and economic relations, as Brazil began its recovery from two decades of hyperinflation (1992–95), he became the UK's chief representative to the World Trade Organisation in Geneva. There he lobbied for a further round of global trade negotiations, participated in trade policy reviews, chaired the WTO's Balance of Payments Committee, and helped to set up the Advisory Centre on WTO Law.

== Ambassador to the IAEA ==
In 2001, he was appointed Ambassador to the International Atomic Energy Agency (IAEA) and the United Nations organisations in Vienna.In 2012, Jenkins participated in the *Energy & Natural Security* conference in Moscow, where he delivered a presentation on nuclear policy. He served in this role until 2006.

After leaving the Diplomatic Service in 2006, he worked as a special representative for the Renewable Energy and Energy Efficiency Partnership in Vienna and served as an adviser to the director of the International Institute for Applied Systems Analysis. He later qualified as a civil and commercial mediator.

Since 2010, he has been a partner in The Ambassador Partnership LLP, a dispute resolution and mediation firm. From 2010 to 2012, he was an associate fellow of the Geneva Centre for Security Policy.

== Negotiations over Iran's nuclear programme ==
Peter was active within the international movement supporting negotiations with Iran and seeking diplomatic solutions that respect Iran's rights to a civil nuclear power industry but that also restrain it from achieving a nuclear weapon capability. In an article in the Telegraph in January 2012 he expressed concern that imposing ever tighter sanctions on Iran required an exaggeration of the Iranian nuclear threat which fuelled the scare-mongering of those who wanted sanctions to be a mere step on the way to war. He argued that Iran's uranium enrichment programme could be handled in accordance with the Nuclear Non-Proliferation Treaty (NPT), since for years the Western assessment had been that Iran’s leaders were not decided on acquiring nuclear weapons. He observed that coercion rarely delivers durable solutions. He urged Western leaders to lower their sights and focus on a realistic target: Iranian agreement to state-of-the-art nuclear safeguards and voluntary non-proliferation assurances. Failure to be realistic would result in the devil having the best tunes, as far too many American politicians saw advantage in whipping up fear and hatred of Iran.

In September 2013 he co-authored an article in the Christian Science Monitor with Robert Hunter, US ambassador to NATO in the mid-90s. They argued that the election of Dr Hassan Rouhani as president of Iran presented an opportunity for the West to review its position in the nuclear negotiations with Iran that had got under way in April 2012. Instead of requiring Iran to dismantle its uranium enrichment programme (as demanded by Israel) or reduce the number of centrifuges at its disposal to a few thousand, the West should ask Iran to volunteer confidence-building demonstrations of peaceful intent during a transition to full enjoyment of its right to make peaceful use of nuclear technologies. The West should also focus its efforts on influencing Iranian cost/benefit calculations, as recommended in US national intelligence estimates, and build on Iran's interest in preserving the nuclear non-proliferation regime.

== Accusation during a debate on Iran ==
In 2012, during a debate at Warwick University, Peter Jenkins was accused of antisemitism for stating that it seemed that Jews and Christians no longer shared the idea that a just war requires the use of force to be proportionate. In the debate, Jenkins, Opposed in the debate by representatives of the Foundation for the Defence of Democracy and the Henry Jackson Society, he spoke successfully in proposition to the motion "this house would rather a nuclear armed Iran than war", explaining that diplomacy could avert both war and Iranian acquisition of nuclear weapons. The Chief executive of the Board of Deputies of British Jews subsequently opined that "he clearly sees Jews as having different moral compass that is irreconcilable with the Christian West. This is grossly offensive and palpable nonsense". In a letter to the editor of the Jewish Chronicle, Peter Jenkins apologised for any offence he might have given and explained that his intention had been to draw attention to the tendency of the Jewish state of Israel to make disproportionate use of force, contrary to just war doctrine.

== Report about Public Opposition to First Use of Nuclear Weapons ==
Since 2017 Peter Jenkins has been chairman of the executive committee of British Pugwash, a branch of Pugwash International Conferences on Science and World Affairs. In that capacity, during November 2021, he reported in the Bulletin of the Atomic Scientists that British Pugwash had commissioned a survey of public opinion in the United Kingdom which revealed that two-thirds of the public were opposed to NATO being the first to use nuclear weapons in the event of Russia invading one or more of the Baltic states without resorting to nuclear weapons. He went on to question the British government’s belief that threatening the first use of nuclear weapons was a credible way of deterring non-nuclear threats to NATO, and to point out that, once one of two nuclear-armed states resorts to nuclear weapons, there is no empirical evidence for supposing that nuclear escalation, leading to catastrophe, can be avoided. He urged diplomatic engagement to produce a balance of NATO and Russian non-nuclear forces in theatres where NATO fears Russian aggression and, if necessary, an increase in spending on non-nuclear defences in place of reliance on nuclear first use.

In July 2025 Peter (on behalf of the Nobel-Peace-Prize-winning Pugwash movement) and the Royal Society organised an event to mark the 70th anniversary of the Russell-Einstein Manifesto, which led to the movement’s creation, and to draw attention to the deteriorating outlook for global nuclear arms control and disarmament.

== Languages ==
He speaks French, German and Portuguese.

== Family ==
He is married to a former Hong Kong trade policy official. They have two children. He was made a Companion in the Order of St. Michael and St. George in 2005.
