= The Big Channel =

Argentine children's cable TV channel

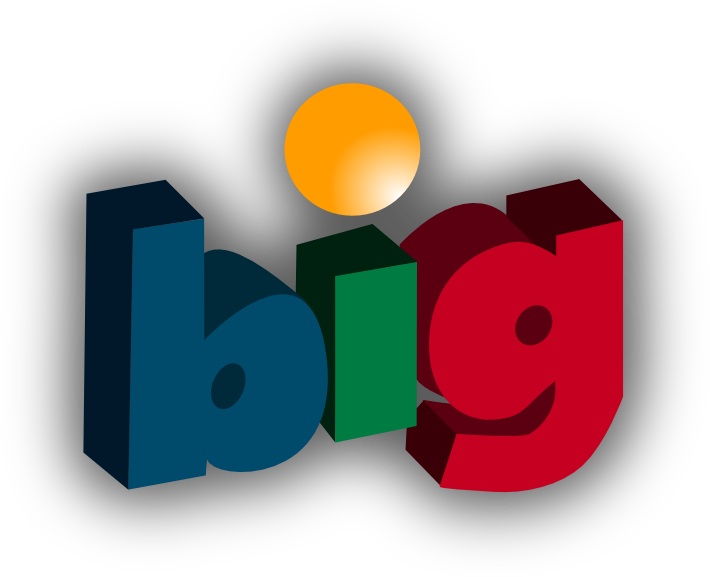
- Broadcast area: Argentina
- Headquarters: Argentina

Ownership
- Owner: Liberty Global

History
- Launched: 1 February 1990; 36 years ago
- Closed: 3 September 2001; 24 years ago

The Big Channel was an Argentine cable channel aimed at children, owned by Pramer. It was associated with the former toy importer, Cartan.

== History ==
=== Early years ===
Although the channel was inaugurated in mid-1989, its debut was in the early 1990s. It succeeded CableMágico, the only channel for children to date, which was available on Cablevisión.

Running 24 hours a day, the main objective was to promote Cartan imported toys, which were mainly manufactured by Tyco, for which Cartan had an exclusive distribution contract in Argentina. All commercials showed the corporate logo, followed by Tyco products such as SpyTech, Hit Sticks, Typhoon, Chattanooga Choo Choo and Domino Rally, among others. The commercials were dubbed into Spanish.

The channel brought varied merchandise to the marketplace, including, in 1993, a CD entitled "A Jugar y a Cantar con el Big (Let's play and sing with the Big)" and the monthly "Big Magazine".

=== Closure ===
Programming temporarily closed in January 1995, as Cartan went bankrupt that year. In its place, the producers decided to launch Magic Kids, a channel that was 100% Pramer-owned.

The Big Channel returned to Cablevisión and other cable operators in Argentina in 1995, during the reign of Magic Kids as the most watched cable channel in Argentina. After its return, Pramer was forced to buy "promotional package" series that were largely ignored by the public, along with other series that it was interested in for Magic Kids. The Big Channel was thus reduced to transmitting second-rate series or series that Magic Kids had stopped broadcasting, but whose contracts had not yet expired. Without quality programming and advertising, the channel lost its audience and permanently closed in 2001.
