= A Walk Across America =

Nonfiction travel book by Peter Jenkins

- First edition (publ. William Morrow)
- Author: Peter Jenkins
- Language: English
- Genre: Biography
- Publisher: HarperCollins Publishers
- Publication date: 1979
- Pages: 320
- ISBN: 978-0060-9595-55
- OCLC: 48168396

A Walk Across America is a nonfiction travel book first published in 1979. It was the first book written by travel author Peter Jenkins, with support from the National Geographic Society. The book depicts his journey from Alfred, New York, to New Orleans, Louisiana. While on his journey of self-discovery, he engaged himself in others' lives, lost his best friend, experienced a religious conversion, and courted a new wife, Barbara Jenkins (Pennell).

== Synopsis ==
Peter Jenkins was raised in a northern middle-class suburban home in Connecticut. While attending Alfred University, he married at 19, despite his sympathies for the new hippie youth movement and its belief in free love. He graduated on 30 May 1973, feeling stifled by both his environment and his marriage. After separating from his wife, he cast about for an escape. Disillusioned with post-Vietnam America, a kindly janitor at the University advised Jenkins to not give up on America until he had truly taken time to meet the people of America. Thus, Jenkins decided that despite his dislike of his native land, he would meet its citizens by walking from his college town of Alfred to the Gulf of Mexico before continuing across the United States. On 15 October 1973, he shouldered his pack, whistled up his dog Cooper, and began walking south. He planned to stop and work during his journey whenever he needed money.

Jenkins' trip to the Gulf saw him lay over for the winter in Appalachia before he continued south. He worked at various laboring jobs, such as sawmill hand, as money was needed. As a hippie and damnyankee outsider, Jenkins sometimes met with suspicion and hostility. More often, he was greeted with hospitality by those from whom he least expected it. On occasion, initial hostility from others morphed into goodwill and friendship. Jenkins was invited to stay in the homes of various good samaritans, including an Appalachian hermit and an African-American family. On occasion, he lived with these samaritans for considerable lengths of time; his stay with the African-American family in Murphy, North Carolina, lasted several months.

At one of his stays, at The Farm hippie commune in Tennessee, Cooper was run over and killed by a truck. After burying Cooper, he sorrowfully continued his hike solo, headed for Alabama. Once there, he met Governor George Wallace; Wallace alerted state employees to keep a helpful lookout for Jenkins. Jenkins then attended a revival meeting in Mobile run by James Robison and embraced the Christian faith. Jenkins ended his trek in New Orleans, where he courted his new wife Barbara while they were living in a seminary. After some self-doubt as to her fitness to hike with him to the west coast, Barbara joined him in his journey.

== Themes ==
A young man's process of coming of age and self-discovery are the themes of A Walk Across America. Realizing that his point of view is limited by his suburban rearing, Jenkins is determined to learn more about other American lifestyles. His route takes him into the American South, a region reputed for racial and social prejudice; because he is an outsider, this makes him apprehensive. However, he was befriended by, and befriended, a wide array of people living outside his cultural ken. His travels on his personal odyssey added to the tension, whether nearly dying of influenza in an Appalachian Trail shelter, being threatened by prejudiced lawmen or rednecks, or menaced by wide trucks on a narrow bridge.

Jenkins concluded his book with his own personal summary: "I started out searching for myself and my country, and found both."

== Publication details ==
Jenkins walked into the National Geographic Society's office in Washington early in his trip seeking support. The Society supplied him with a camera and lenses, and advised him of their interest in the book. He began writing an article for them when he got to New Orleans in 1975. Jenkins began writing A Walk Across America in Winter, 1976 while on a ranch in the Rocky Mountains; he completed the book in Ouray, Colorado, in 1978.

Published in 1979, A Walk Across America was into its sixth edition within a year, as it spent three months on the New York Times bestseller list. It was a selection of both the Newsweek Condensed Book Club and Reader's Digest Condensed Books. It was also an alternate selection of the Word Book Club and the Literary Guild. A Walk Across America has been printed in 30 editions, including an audio book and an ebook version.

== Further works by Peter Jenkins ==
- A Walk Across America (1979)
- The Walk West (1981)
- Journey into China (1982)
- The Tennessee Sampler (1985)
- Across China (1986)
- The Road Unseen (1987)
- Close Friends (1989)
- Along the Edge of America (1995)
- The Untamed Coast (1995)
- Looking for Alaska (2001)
