= Max Biggs =

American basketball player (1923–1990)

Personal information
- Born: June 15, 1923 West Lebanon, Indiana, U.S.
- Died: October 25, 1990 (aged 67) Palm Beach Gardens, Florida, U.S.
- Listed height: 6 ft 0 in (1.83 m)
- Listed weight: 190 lb (86 kg)

Career information
- High school: Jefferson (Lafayette, Indiana)
- College: Purdue (1942–1943)
- Position: Center / forward

Career history
- 1946: Sheboygan Red Skins

Max Eugene Biggs (June 15, 1923 – October 25, 1990) was an American professional basketball player. Biggs played in four games in the National Basketball League for the Sheboygan Red Skins during the 1946–47 season A native of Lafayette, Indiana, Biggs played basketball for one season at Purdue University before enrolling in the navy. He also played for Purdue's football team.
