= Kittinger Company =

American furniture company

- Company type: Family business
- Industry: Furniture
- Founded: 1866
- Headquarters: Buffalo, New York, USA
- Products: Residential and Contract Furniture
- Owner: Raymond Bialkowski, President/CEO
- Number of employees: < 50
- Website: www.kittingerfurniture.com

The Kittinger Company is an American maker of traditional colonial reproduction furniture that was founded in 1866. Today Kittinger is known for the high-quality furniture it produces that is featured prominently in the White House.

== History ==
The Kittinger Company was founded in Buffalo, New York, in 1866 as "Thompson, Colie & Co." Around 1870 the company began crafting hand-made upholstered furniture and by this time had changed its name to "Colie & Son" after George and Oliver Colie took control. The furniture business proved so successful for the Colie's that in 1885 they built a factory specifically for the crafting of furniture. Advertising in 1904, Colie and Son illustrated one of their armchairs, that showed they were still making furniture in the free Colonial Revival style for their "snappy, original styles in Parlor Suites, Odd Chairs, Divans, Easy Chairs etc." Reproductions more closely based on original American 18th-century pieces of furniture would come to characterize the firm's production under George Colie's son-in-law

In 1913, Irvine J. Kittinger, George Colie's son-in-law, and his brother Ralph purchased the company from the Colie family and changed the company's name to the Kittinger Furniture Company. Under the Kittinger family's control, the company's primary focus was to craft the highest quality furniture possible with Irvine Kittinger saying "Our business is not primarily to turn furniture into money, but to produce something really worthwhile." By 1929, the company was grossing $1,000,000 annually. The Kittinger family controlled and remained involved with the company until they sold their interests in 1966.

Between 1966 and 1990, Kittinger Furniture had a total of six owners due to mergers and acquisitions of its corporate owners. In 1995 the company entered bankruptcy after a private owner was sentenced on fraud charges.

A former Kittinger employee purchased the Kittinger name and production rights in 1996. The new company has subsequently been profitable.

Today Kittinger is one of the oldest surviving crafters of fine built-to-order furniture in the United States.

== Showrooms and production ==
Kittinger Furniture is available through several showrooms across the country. Kittinger's primary showroom is located at its factory and corporate offices. Showrooms in Georgia, New Jersey, New York City and Pennsylvania represent and carry Kittinger. In 2012 Kittinger Furniture opened a showroom in Tokyo, Japan, at the Sala Azabu store.

Every piece of Kittinger Furniture is built-to-order to customers’ specifications and needs in Buffalo, New York, and can be shipped around the world. In recent years Kittinger has become a resource for collectors to create reproductions of hard to find pieces or in different scales that fit their needs.

== Special projects ==
=== The White House ===
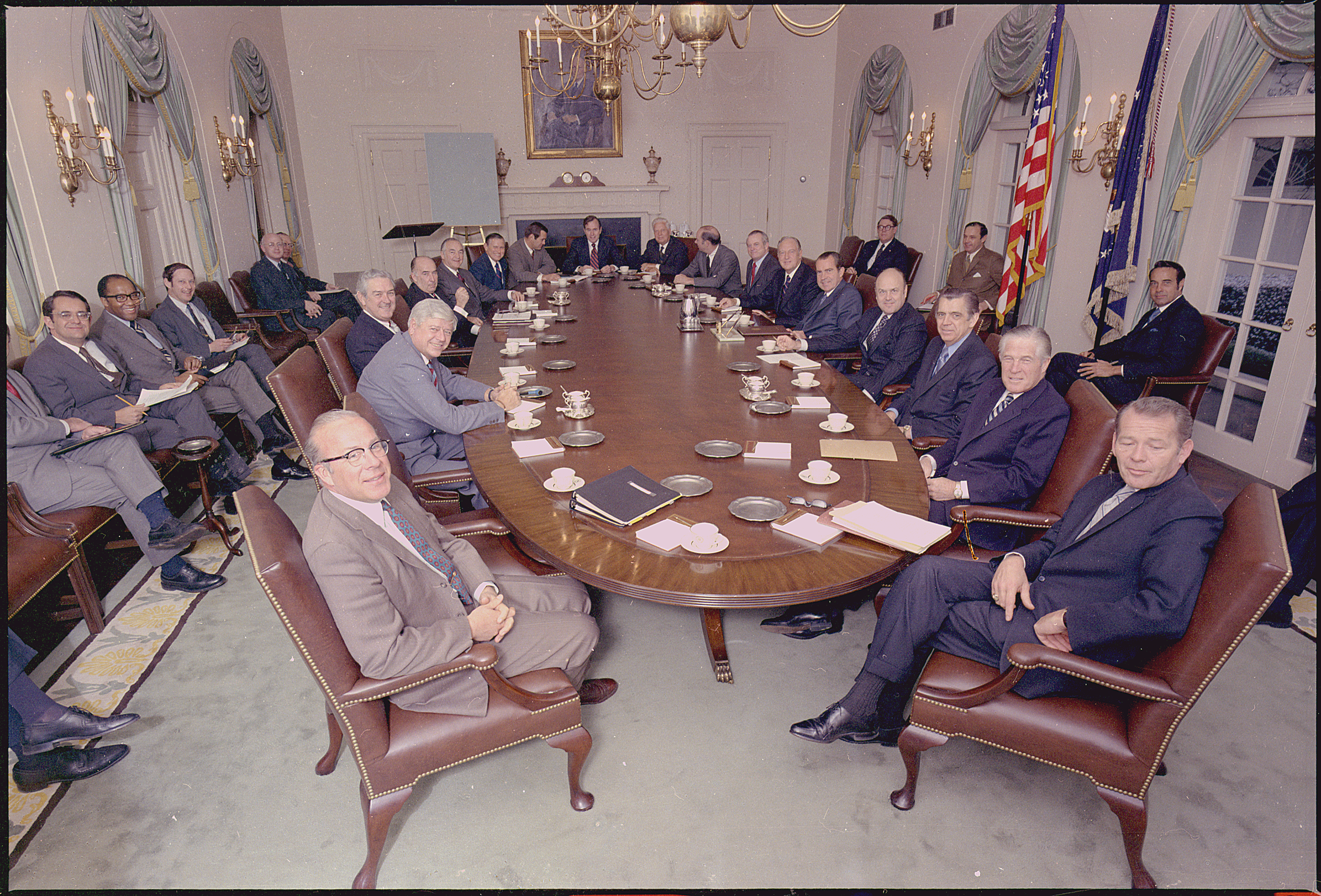
Nixon's Cabinet with Kittinger furniture

A number of Kittinger reproductions can still be found in the West Wing office area of the White House in Washington, D.C. Colonial Williamsburg Foundation interior designers were commissioned by President Richard Nixon in 1970 to redo the interior design of the President's offices. Kittinger Company furniture was used extensively in the redesign since this company was the sole licensee of furniture for the Colonial Williamsburg Foundation's famous program to produce exact reproductions of 18th century antiques. Included in the redesign was a new conference table and chairs for the cabinet room. President Nixon wrote a personal check to pay for the new cabinet room table custom made by The Kittinger Company and donated it to the White House.

Along with furnishing areas of the White House, the Kittinger Company has also produced furniture for the inaugurations of former president George W. Bush and President Barack Obama. In 2005, the White House commissioned six chairs from Kittinger for the second inauguration of former president George W. Bush. In 2009, the White House commissioned an additional two chairs and utility table for the inauguration of President Barack Obama. The White House reused the pieces crafted by Kittinger again for the second inauguration of President Barack Obama in 2013.

=== Colonial Williamsburg Foundation ===
In 1937 the Colonial Williamsburg Foundation selected the Kittinger Company as the exclusive licensed reproducer of furniture at Colonial Williamsburg Kittinger reproductions were sold through the Williamsburg Reproductions program, the Craft House, established that year. Visitors to Colonial Williamsburg could see Kittinger cabinetmakers in period costume at work in the workshop established in the Ayscough house. Williamsburg reproductions came with a bill of sale detailing the history of the original piece and were branded with the Williamsburg stamp. Other reproductions by Kittinger were labeled with a letterpress label in the 18th-century style. Like their rivals Biggs Furniture of Richmond, Virginia, Kittinger served an upper middle class market in search of mostly mahogany, reproduction furniture with dovetailed oak drawer lining, frame-and-panel backs and other mark of quality comparable to the originals, in the Queen Anne, Chippendale and Hepplewhite styles. In 1990 the license expired and was granted to Baker Furniture Company.

Apart from the Williamsburg reproductions other series were marketed under names evoking the colonial period: Richmond hill Collection, Old Dominion Collection and the like.

=== Historic Newport ===
The success of Kittinger reproductions licensed by Colonial Williamsburg Foundation encouraged the Preservation Society of Newport County to license Kittinger to reproduce 18th-century pieces by the Goddard and Townsend families of cabinetmakers and other furniture made in colonial Newport, Rhode Island, in the Society's possession. Paper labels on this series of furniture read "For the Preservation Society of Newport County".

=== George W. Bush Presidential Library and Museum ===
The Kittinger Company was commissioned to produce several of its pieces from the White House including fireside chairs, coffee table, pen book table, telephone table, council table and mahogany chairs with cane backs. These pieces are on display in the replica Oval Office in the George W. Bush Presidential Library and Museum.

=== Government ===
In the past, the Kittinger Company has been commissioned to craft furniture for the Capital Building, Supreme Court, and several government officials. Kittinger also reproduced under license furniture for Independence Hall, Philadelphia, and Historic Savannah.

=== White House Down (film) ===
Sony Pictures commissioned Kittinger to make reproductions of its furniture in the White House for its film White House Down, released in 2013. Kittinger crafted several sets of furniture for the production of the film.
