= Biggs Furniture =

Corporation

Biggs Furniture, based in Richmond, Virginia, United States, was once a leading U.S. manufacturer of colonial reproduction furniture. The company flourished in the 20th century, alongside reproductions by Colonial Williamsburg by the Kittinger Company, and other mass market reproduction brands like Ethan Allen and Pennsylvania House. In 1975, the company was purchased by the Kittinger Company.

The restored manufacturing plant at 900 West Marshall Street in Richmond is now an apartment complex. Examples of the furniture were in homes and in public buildings such as the Hotel John Marshall and Miller & Rhoads Tea Room.

The company was one of many Virginia furniture makers of the 20th century. Alfred Hemmings served as the final president of Biggs. Hemmings came to Biggs from Kittinger Furniture of Buffalo, NY. He left Biggs in the late 1970s to return to England, his country of birth, to serve as Managing Director of Brett & Sons in Norwich, East Anglia. He returned as president of Biggs Furniture in the early 1980s until the business shut its doors. During his tenure, Biggs provided furnishings for the White House and the Colonial Williamsburg Foundation. He lived in Richmond in the West End with his wife, Doreen, and is survived by two daughters, Lynn Hemings of E. Amherst NY and Tracy H. Aitken, of Richmond, Va.
