= Robbinsville High School (North Carolina) =

American public school in North Carolina

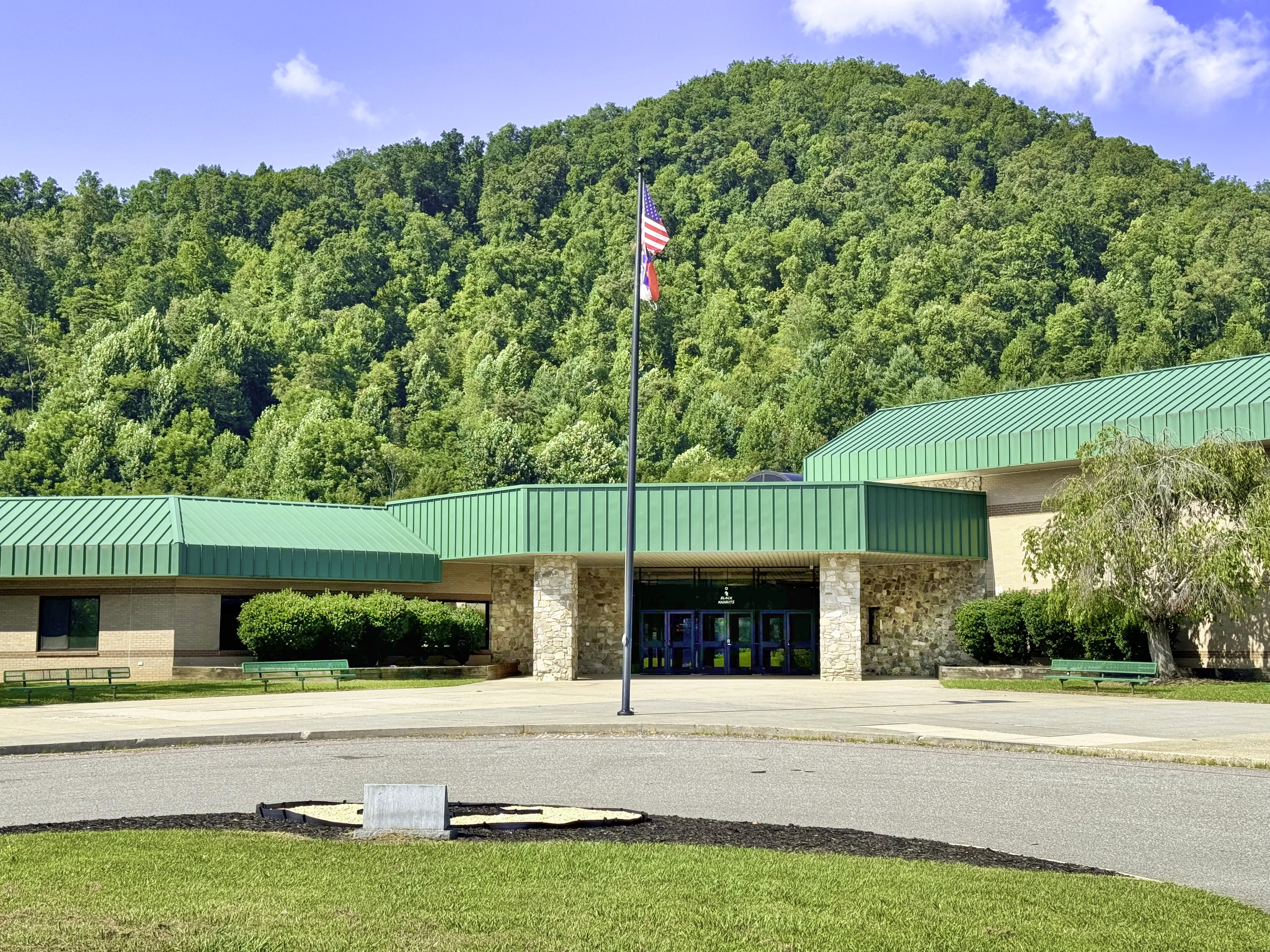
- Robbinsville High School, August 2024

Location
- 301 Sweetwater Rd; Robbinsville, North Carolina 28771; United States; 35°19′31″N 83°47′50″W

Information
- Type: Public
- School district: Graham County Schools
- CEEB code: 343330
- NCES School ID: 370177000734
- Principal: Erica Sawyer
- Teaching staff: 31.73 (FTE)
- Enrollment: 342 (2023-2024)
- Colors: Black and white
- Athletics conference: Smoky Mountain Conference
- Mascot: Black Knights
- Website: graham.k12.nc.us

Robbinsville High School is a public, co-educational secondary school located in Robbinsville, North Carolina. It is the only high school in the Graham County Schools system.

== School information ==
For the 2011–2012 school year, Robbinsville High School had a total population of 372 students and 29.8 teachers on a (FTE) basis. The student population had a gender ratio of 192 male to 180 female. The demographic group makeup of the student population was: White, 310 American Indian, 52; Hispanic, 4; Black, 1; and Asian/Pacific Islander, 0 (two or more races, 5). For the same school year, 204 of the students received free or reduced-cost lunches. Robbinsville High School received a "C" performance grade from the N.C. Department of Public Instruction in 2024.

== History ==
The origins of Robbinsville High School begin in the early 1900s. In 1924, the school was relocated into what is known as The Old Rock Building. The school building housed all grades including high school grades until the 1966–67 school year when it was split into separate high, middle and elementary schools.

In 1987, Stecoah High School in the eastern part of Graham County, closed. The high school portion was then merged into Robbinsville High.

== Athletics ==
Robbinsville is a North Carolina High School Athletic Association (NCHSAA) member school and are currently classified as a 1A school in the Smoky Mountain 1A/2A Conference. Robbinsville's team name is the Black Knights, with the school colors being black and white. Until 1965, Robbinsville's team name was the Blue Devils.

The school offers teams in a variety of sports including: baseball, basketball, cross country, football, softball, track and field, volleyball, and wrestling.

The Black Knights' football team have had a storied history, having won 14 North Carolina 1A state championships.

== Notable alumni ==
- Wade Crane, professional pool player
- Rodney Orr, former NASCAR driver
