= The Big Show =

The Big Show may refer to:

== People ==
- Big Show (born 1972), professional wrestler, real name Paul Wight
- Glenn Maxwell (born 1988), Australian cricket player nicknamed "The Big Show"
- Jared Rosholt (born 1986), American mixed martial arts fighter nicknamed "The Big Show"

== Film ==
- The Big Show (1923 film), the ninth Our Gang short subject comedy released
- The Big Show (1926 film), American silent film directed by George Terwilliger
- The Big Show (1936 film), American film starring Gene Autry
- The Big Show (1960 film), French-Spanish drama film directed by Francisco Rovira Beleta
- The Big Show (1961 film), American film starring Esther Williams

== Radio ==
- The Big Show (NBC Radio), an American radio program from the 1950s
- The Big Show (sports radio show), radio show on WEEI in Boston, Massachusetts
- The John Boy & Billy Big Show, morning radio show in the southern United States
- Steve Wright in the Afternoon, a UK national afternoon radio show on BBC Radio 2 often referred to as The Big Show
- The Big Broadcast, a movie and several vintage-style radio programs

== Television ==
- The Big Show (Chicago TV show), a 1960s Chicago WBKB-TV after school movie program
- The Big Show (TV series), a 1980 adaptation of the 1950s radio program
- "The Big Show" (Steven Universe), a 2018 episode of Steven Universe
- Michael McIntyre's Big Show, a British stand-up comedy show
- The Big Show Show, an American sitcom television series featuring professional wrestler Big Show
- Go-Big Show, an American talent show television series

== Other ==
- Major League Baseball, in the context of players being promoted from or demoted to the minor leagues
- Retail's BIG Show, a retail trade show
- The Big Show (Le Grand Cirque), a book by French flying ace Pierre Clostermann
- "The Big Show", a song by Basshunter from his The Bassmachine album
- Various radio and television shows pairing Dan Patrick with Keith Olbermann
