= Rachel Charlotte Biggs =

English writer and spy

Rachel Charlotte Biggs (1763-1827) was an English writer, letter writer and spy.

She was in France during the French revolution in 1792–1795, and wrote a political narrative about her stay there.

Between 1802 and 1816, she appears to have been or repeatedly visited France and Napoleon controlled Europe. She corresponded with the British politicians William Windham (1750-1810) and Nicholas Vansittart (1766-1851) and reported her observations about military strength, industry and agriculture and political state, asking for British government funds for further travels.

A biography has been published about her.
