= Breast International Group =

International organisation

The Breast International Group (BIG)-aisbl was a not-for-profit organisation that coordinated international academic research in breast cancer. Initiated by the visionary oncologists Professors Martine Piccart and the late Aron Goldhirsch in the mid-1990s, BIG was founded as a Belgian legal entity in 1999 and established its headquarters in Brussels. It brought together academic breast cancer research groups from around the world to design and conduct large, collaborative clinical trials.

In December 2025, BIG announced that, following prolonged financial and economic pressures, it would cease operations, collectively dismiss its employees, and close as a legal entity by the end of 2026. Arrangements were made to transfer responsibility for ongoing studies to other partners to ensure continuity and maintain its commitment to the patients and researchers involved.

== Mission and activities ==
BIG facilitated breast cancer research at an international level by promoting cooperation between academic research groups and networks worldwide. Guided by governance structures and policies that ensured scientific independence from commercial entities and prioritized patient interests, BIG's collaborative model aimed to reduce unnecessary duplication of effort, accelerate patient enrolment, promote data sharing, and support the efficient scientific evaluation of questions that are clinically important to patients and their physicians.

Several BIG-associated trials contributed evidence to support breast cancer treatment guidelines and clinical practices.

== History ==
In the early 1990s, professors Martine Piccart and the late Aron Goldhirsch proposed a new collaborative framework in which breast cancer research groups would meet regularly to share scientific ideas, debate emerging evidence, and jointly conduct international trials. Although trials could be conducted in partnership with the pharmaceutical industry, scientific independence of the academic participants was a cornerstone of the BIG model.

BIG was created in the mid-1990s and became a legal entity in 1999. Although established as a European network, over the following years, it developed into the largest global network dedicated exclusively to breast cancer research. At its peak, BIG managed almost 60 academic research groups across Europe, Canada, Latin America, Asia and Australasia, involving several thousand hospitals and research centres worldwide. BIG also collaborated with the US National Cancer Institute (NCI) and the NCI's National Clinical Trials Network (NCTN).

== Clinical trials and research programmes ==
BIG developed and coordinated numerous large international clinical trials, including HERA, MINDACT, ALTTO, APHINITY and OlympiA, many of which have been practice-changing:

- BIG 1-98, which contributed to establishing aromatase inhibitors in the treatment of hormone receptor-positive breast cancer;
- SOFT and TEXT, which influenced treatment approaches for premenopausal women;
- HERA and APHINITY, studies of Trastuzumab and trastuzumab plus pertuzumab, which significantly improved outcomes for patients with HER2-positive breast cancer;
- MINDACT, which demonstrated that some women with early breast cancer could safely avoid chemotherapy based on genomic testing with MammaPrint®.
- OlympiA, which showed that adjuvant treatment with olaparib, significantly reduced the risk of death for patients with BRCA-mutated HER2-negative high-risk early breast cancer.

An important focus for BIG was to conduct purely academic studies addressing clinically important questions without commercial interest but of tremendous importance for patients. These included POSITIVE (investigating the safety of temporarily interrupting endocrine therapy to try to have a child), AURORA (a molecular screening programme aimed at better understanding the evolution of Metastatic Breast Cancer in order to develop better treatments in the future), EXPERT (exploring which patients with low-risk breast cancer according to genomic testing can safely be spared radiotherapy), the International Programme of Breast Cancer in Men (to better understand the biology of this disease), and studies focusing on older patients with breast cancer.

Most BIG trials collected biological specimens for future translational research.

BIG also coordinated or participated in important projects funded or co-funded by the European Commission, such as TRANSBIG, EURECA, INTEGRATE, and Path-for-young. In its later years, it also received European Commission co-funded operating grants, BIG-SCOPE and BIG-SPARK.

== Principles of research conduct ==
All BIG research activities adhered to the organisation's Principles of Research Conduct, which were designed to ensure scientific independence from commercial interests, academic control of study data, and the publication of results according to academic standards, regardless of outcome.

== Governance ==
BIG was governed by its Executive Board, responsible for the organisation's overall strategy and supervision, and by the General Assembly, composed of representatives of BIG members research groups and acting as the association's highest decision-making body. Chaired by Professor Martine Piccart for over two decades, in its final years, BIG was chaired by Professor David Allan Cameron (United Kingdom), with Professor Hans Wildiers serving as President of BIG against breast cancer, BIG's philanthropic unit.

== Patient partnership ==
Very early on, BIG started to collaborate with Europa Donna to involve patients on the steering committees of its studies, and the organization played an important role in the MINDACT trial. Beginning in 2019, BIG stablished its Patient Partnership to facilitate the meaningful

involvement of people affected by breast cancer in the design and conduct of its studies. During the last elections held for BIG's Executive Board, two seats were made available to patient representatives to ensure that research would develop not just for patients but directly with patients.

== BIG against breast cancer ==
BIG's purely academic research was supported in part by BIG against breast cancer, the organisation's philanthropic unit. Funds raised were used to help finance academic trials and research programmes that addressed patient-centred questions not typically supported by commercial funding.

== Closure ==
In December 2025, BIG's Executive Board took the decision to proceed with collective redundancies of all Headquarters’ staff and to close BIG as a legal entity by the end of 2026. The decision followed several years of increasing financial pressure related to reduced availability of grants and subsidies, declining study-related income, lower fundraising returns, and broader economic and geopolitical challenges.

Unfortunately, no viable long-term solution could be identified to ensure the organisation's financial sustainability. Arrangements were made to transfer scientific and operational responsibilities for ongoing studies to other partners to ensure study integrity and continued support for participating patients and investigators.

The closure marked the end of more than 25 years of international academic collaboration in breast cancer research led and coordinated by BIG.
