= Preston, Virginia =

Populated place located in Henry County, Virginia, US

Coordinates: 36.658°N 79.980°W

Preston (GNIS FID: 1496114) is a populated place located in Henry County, Virginia. Preston is named for William Preston.

The elevation is 938 feet. Preston appears on the Martinsville West U.S. Geological Survey Map. Henry County is in the Eastern Time Zone (UTC -5 hours).

A legal action against the Cleveland, Cincinnati, Chicago and St. Louis Railway for non-delivery of brick making machinery and other goods to Clayton and Albert Potts of Preston, Virginia, by connecting railway lines in 1891 showed that a local businessman could win against a larger railroad company.

As early as 1822, there was a US Post Office run by Jesse Philips at "Glady Creek Cross Roads", which was in Preston, Virginia. It was listed as being 223 miles from Washington, DC, and 329 miles from the capital of Richmond, Virginia. In 1859, there was another US Post Office run by David Ridenour, for the German settlement at Preston, Virginia.

In 1808, a large sheep, weighing 146 pounds unshorn, with 7.75 pounds of fleece, was exhibited by William Alexander of Preston, Virginia.
