= Peter Jenkins (travel author) =

American travel author (born 1951)

- Born: Peter Jenkins; August 7, 1951 (age 74)
- Occupations: Writer, Travel writer
- Known for: Author of A Walk Across America

Peter Jenkins (born August 7, 1951) is an American travel author known for walking from New York to Oregon between October 1973 and January 1979 while writing a bestselling book, A Walk Across America.

== Early life and education ==
Jenkins is a graduate of Alfred University, with a BFA in Sculpture/Ceramics (1973), as well as an honorary doctorate (2003). Jenkins first married at age 19, but by the time he graduated from college in 1973, he and his wife had separated.

== Walk across America ==
Jenkins began his walk across America in Alfred, New York, in October 1973. He was accompanied by his dog, Cooper, a half Alaskan Malamute that died in an accident with a water truck at The Farm in Tennessee.

Upon reaching the end of his southward trek in New Orleans, Louisiana, Jenkins found a new companion, Barbara Jo Pennell, who became his second wife and accompanied him on his walk west. He finished the journey in Florence, Oregon, in January 1979.

National Geographic magazine became interested in his walk after Jenkins and Cooper stopped in at the magazine's offices while walking through Washington, D.C. Jenkins' walk experience was featured twice in the magazine: "Walk Across America" in April 1977, and "Walk Across America: Part II" in August 1979.

In 2012, Jenkins returned home from a 2-year drive across America in a 1957 Chevy station wagon.

== Personal life ==
Barbara and Peter have three children. They divorced in 1987. Peter married two more times, and has three more children with his other wives.

Jenkins resides in Spring Hill, Tennessee.

== Works ==
- A Walk Across America (1979)
- The Walk West (1981)
- Journey into China (1982)
- The Tennessee Sampler (1985)
- Across China (1986)
- The Road Unseen (1987)
- Close Friends (1989)
- Along the Edge of America (1995)
- The Untamed Coast (1995)
- Looking for Alaska (2001)
