= Bassett Furniture =

American furniture manufacturer and retailer

Bassett Furniture Industries, Inc.
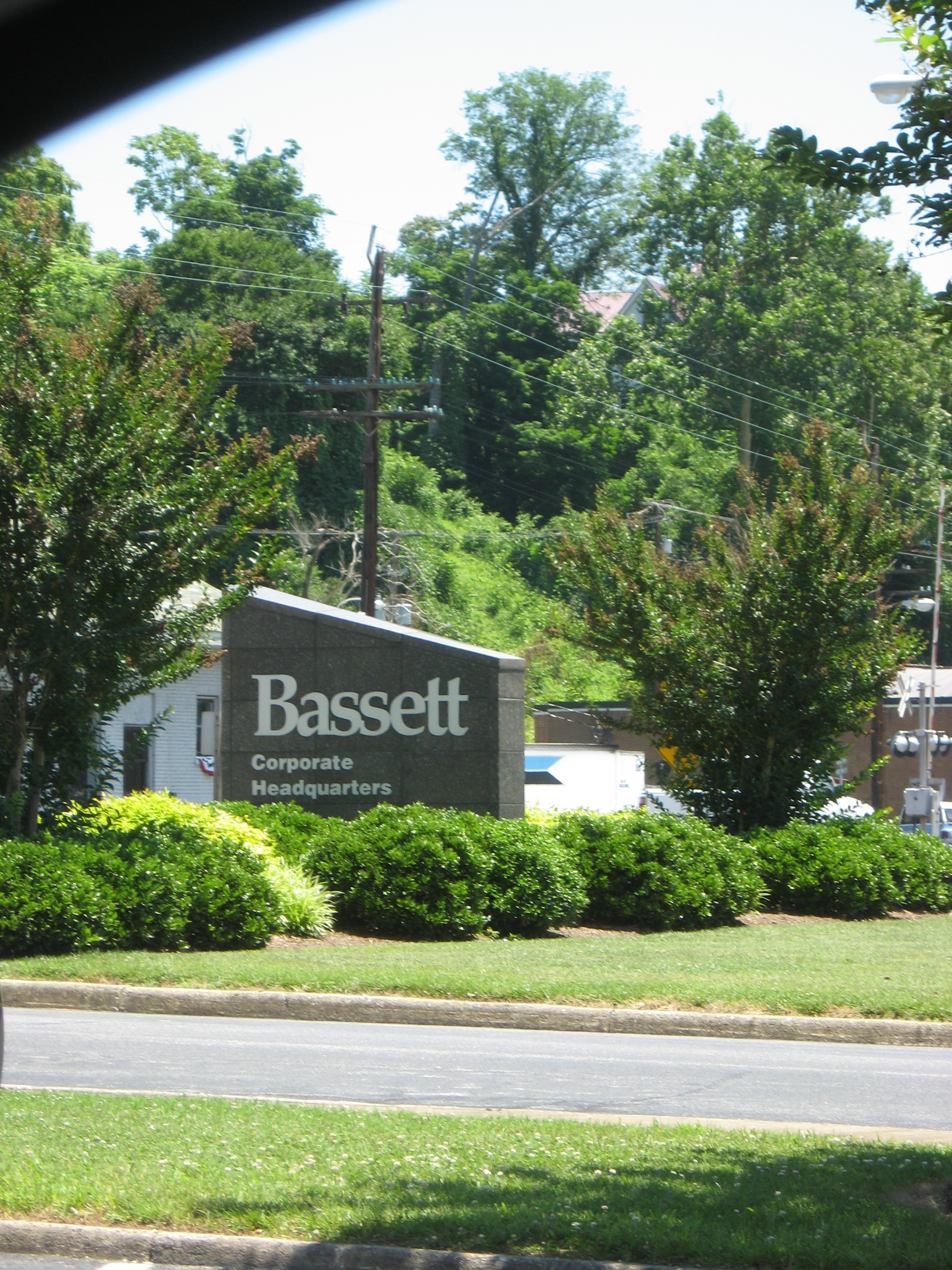
- Sign at headquarters
- Type: Public
- Traded as: Nasdaq: BSET; Russell 2000 Component
- Industry: Furniture
- Founded: 1902; 124 years ago
- Founder: J. D. Bassett, Sr.; Charles C. Bassett; Samuel H. Bassett; Reed L. Stone
- Headquarters: Bassett, Virginia, U.S.
- Number of locations: 60 company-owned, 40 licensed (as of 2024)
- Key people: Robert H. Spilman Jr. (CEO - outgoing); Tony Chivari (CEO - incoming)
- Products: Home furnishings and fixtures
- Revenue: US$ 452.5 million (2017)
- Operating income: US$ 27.02 million (2017)
- Net income: US$ 18.26 million (2017)
- Total assets: US$ 293.75 million (2017)
- Total equity: US$ 191.46 million (2017)
- Number of employees: 2,600+
- Website: www.bassettfurniture.com

Bassett Furniture Industries, Inc. is a furniture manufacturer and retailer, headquartered in Bassett, Virginia, United States. It was founded in 1902 by John D. Bassett, Charles C. Bassett, Samuel H. Bassett, and Reed L. Stone. Bassett Furniture is one of the oldest furniture manufacturers in Virginia. The company began when the founders, operating a family sawmill in the foothills of the Blue Ridge Mountains, decided to use surplus lumber to produce bedroom furniture. According to oral history, the idea to pivot from raw lumber to finished furniture was proposed by the founders’ wives, Roxanne A. Hundley and Pocahontas Hundley.

Bassett rapidly grew through the early 20th century, becoming a major force in the American furniture industry. By the 1920s, it was shipping products throughout the eastern United States. During World War II, the company contributed to the war effort by manufacturing wooden truck beds for U.S. military vehicles, including the GMC CCKW. Bassett's wartime production significantly expanded its manufacturing capabilities and footprint.

Today, Bassett operates approximately 60 company-owned retail locations in the United States and Puerto Rico and licenses its retail brand to about 40 additional independently operated locations. It manufactures and sells a wide range of home furnishings, including custom upholstery, bedroom and dining room sets, and accent pieces. The company maintains domestic manufacturing operations in Virginia and North Carolina, and its business model emphasizes vertical integration, in-house design, and customization.

Bassett has remained under family influence for much of its history and is currently led by Robert H. Spilman Jr., a descendant of the founding family. The company is publicly traded on the NASDAQ under the ticker symbol BSET and is a component of the Russell 2000 Index.

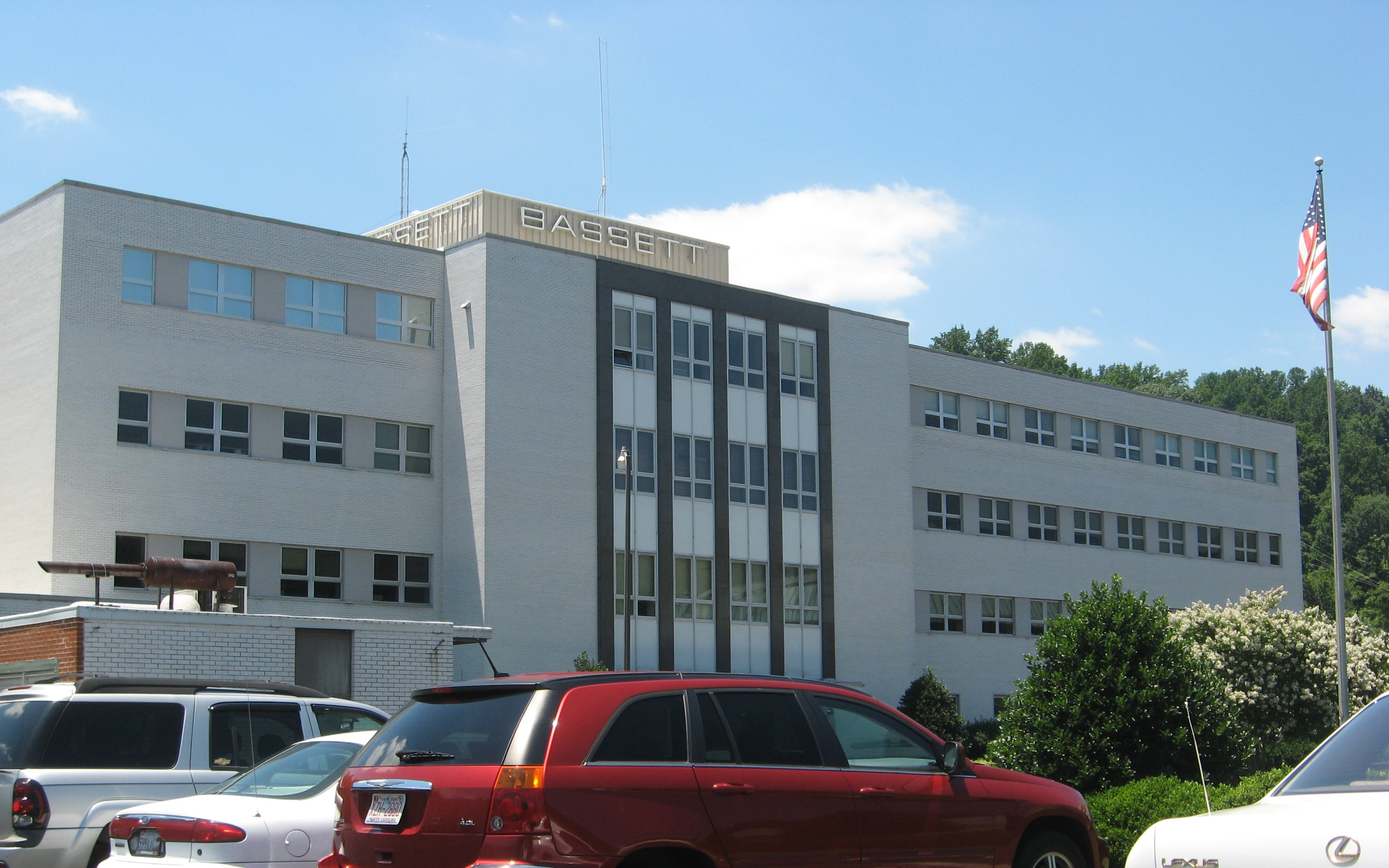
Bassett headquarters (2010)

== History ==
Bassett Furniture was organized in 1901 by J. D. Bassett, Sr., who would go on to serve as chairman of the board of directors well into his later years. He was joined in the venture by his brothers Charles Columbus (C. C.) Bassett and Sam Bassett, along with his brother-in-law Reed L. Stone. The founders initially operated a sawmill and lumber business in Henry County, Virginia, and began making furniture as a way to add value to surplus timber. Their early products, including solid oak bedroom suites, quickly gained popularity and helped establish the company as a major regional manufacturer.

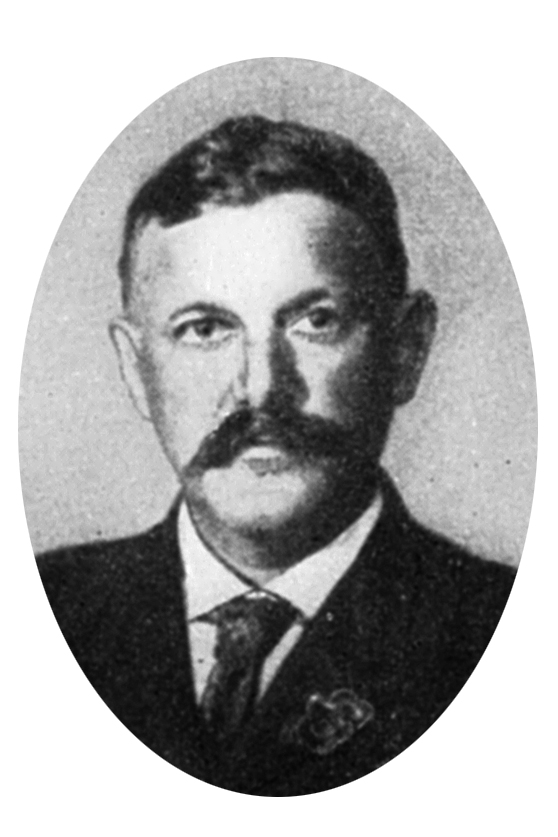
J. D. Bassett

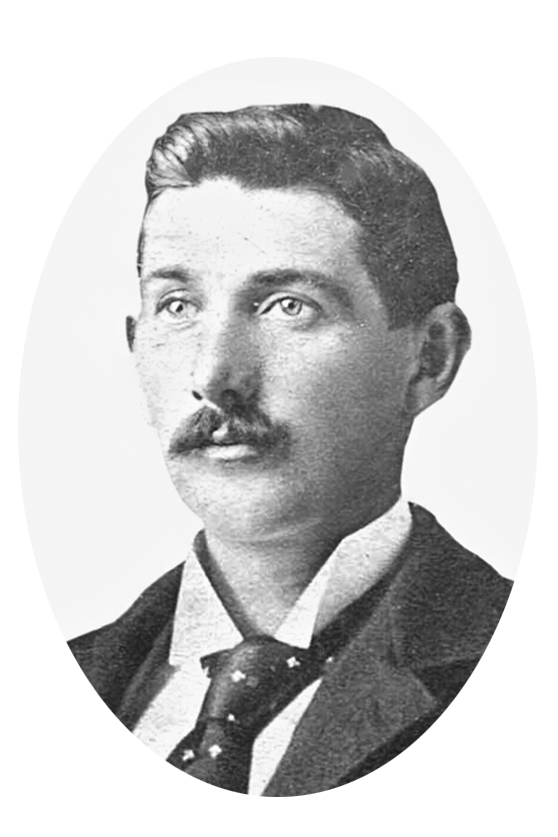
C. C. Bassett

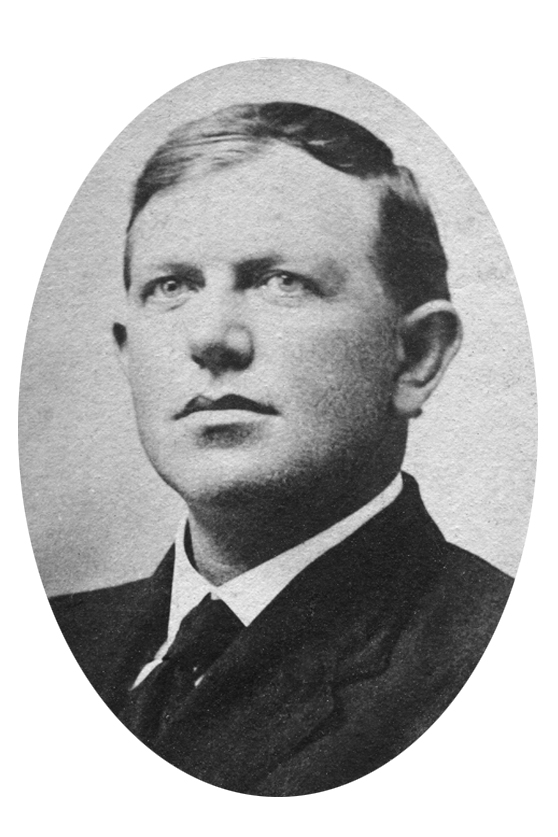
S. H. Bassett

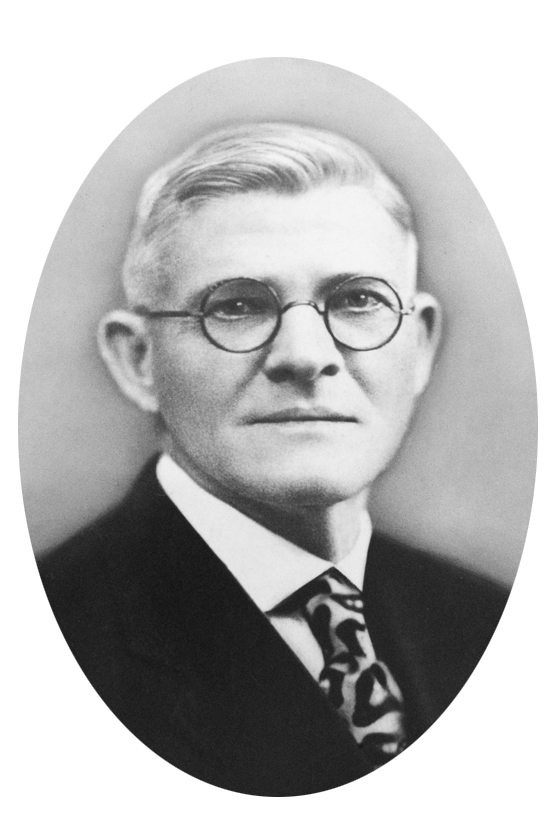
R. L. Stone

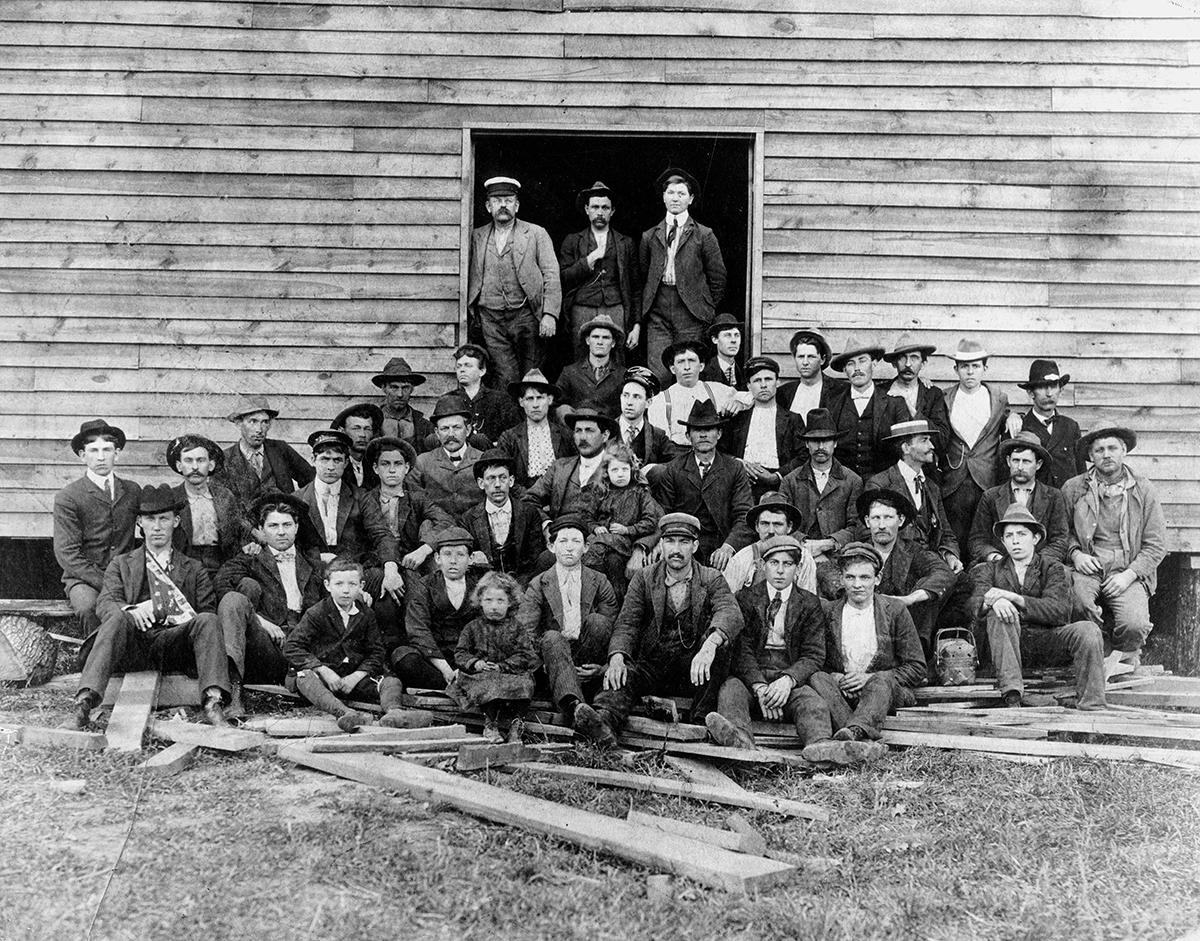
Workers at one of the original Bassett Furniture facilities, early 1900s. The company grew from a local sawmill to become one of the largest furniture manufacturers in the U.S.

By the late 1920s, several family-operated furniture companies were thriving under different names—including J. D. Bassett Manufacturing Co., W. M. Bassett Furniture Co., and Bassett Furniture Company. Though profitable, these firms were increasingly competing with one another. In 1929, J. D. Bassett, Sr. called a family meeting with his sons, including Doug and Bill Bassett, and urged unity, saying, "I don't believe you can be exceptionally successful in this business if you are divided."

The following year, in 1930, Bassett Furniture Industries, Inc. was created through the merger of those three companies. W. M. Bassett—son of J. D. Bassett, Sr.—was named president of the new entity and oversaw its growth into one of the largest furniture manufacturers in the United States.

During World War II, Bassett contributed to the U.S. war effort by producing wooden cargo truck bodies under military contracts, including beds for the GMC CCKW "deuce-and-a-half" trucks. After the war, the company resumed civilian production and expanded into dining and living room furniture, as well as custom upholstery.

Bassett was listed on the over-the-counter (OTC) market in 1965 under the ticker symbol BSET, later switching to Nasdaq, and through the 1970s and 1980s, it became a national brand recognized for its craftsmanship and range of home furnishings. Facing increased global competition in the 1990s and early 2000s, the company restructured, closing several manufacturing facilities and focusing on quick-turnaround custom upholstery, vertically integrated retail, and U.S.-based production.

Today, Bassett continues to operate as one of the oldest furniture manufacturers in Virginia, maintaining domestic manufacturing operations and a strong retail presence throughout the United States.

== World War II ==
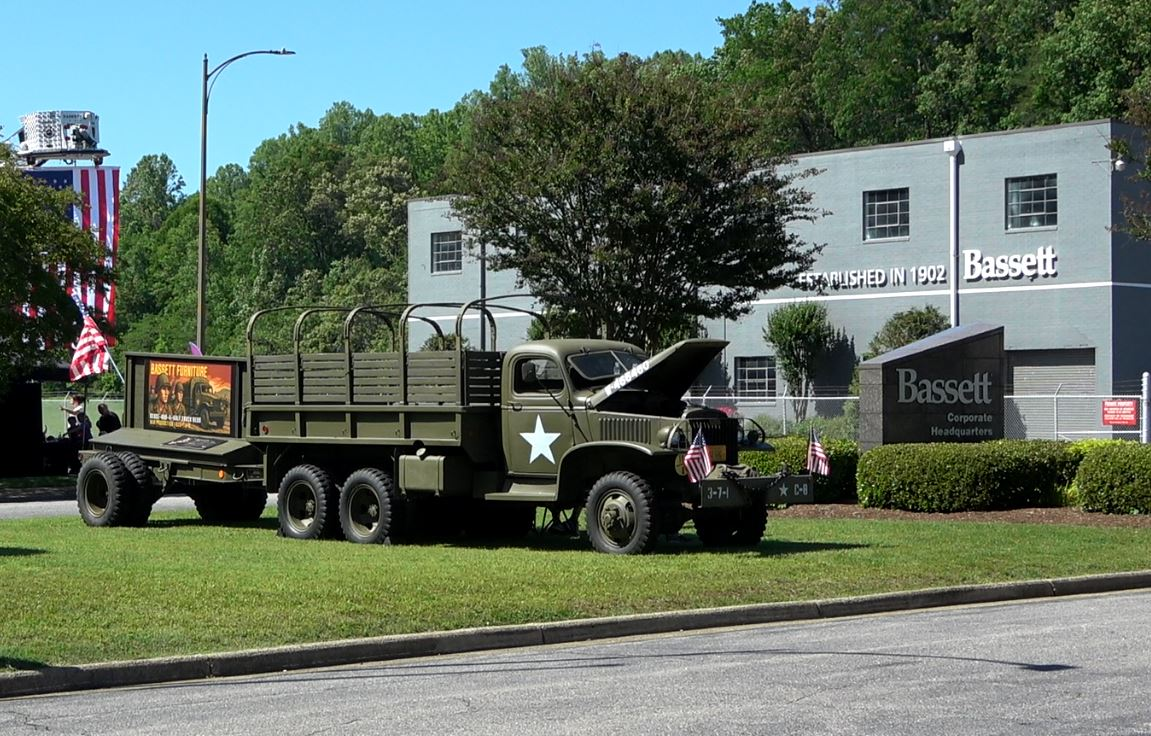
Bassett Furniture's 1942 GMC CCKW

During World War II, Bassett Furniture Industries participated in the national war effort by manufacturing wooden cargo truck beds for the U.S. Army. In 1942, the company secured a subcontract through Yellow Truck & Coach, a division of General Motors, to supply beds for the GMC CCKW 2½-ton trucks. To support this production, Bassett retooled its facilities—including the Old Town Plant in Bassett, Virginia—and filed a Necessity Certificate with the War Department, detailing more than $70,000 in equipment upgrades. The company produced over $1.5 million worth of truck bodies by war’s end. Approximately 600 employees served in the military during the conflict, while others were granted occupational deferments to continue essential factory work.

In 2024, as part of its legacy and preservation activities, Bassett Furniture acquired a restored 1942 GMC CCKW truck for public display. The vehicle, along with a custom informational trailer, is used at company and community events to commemorate Bassett’s wartime role and honor the contributions of employees past and present.

== The Big Chair ==
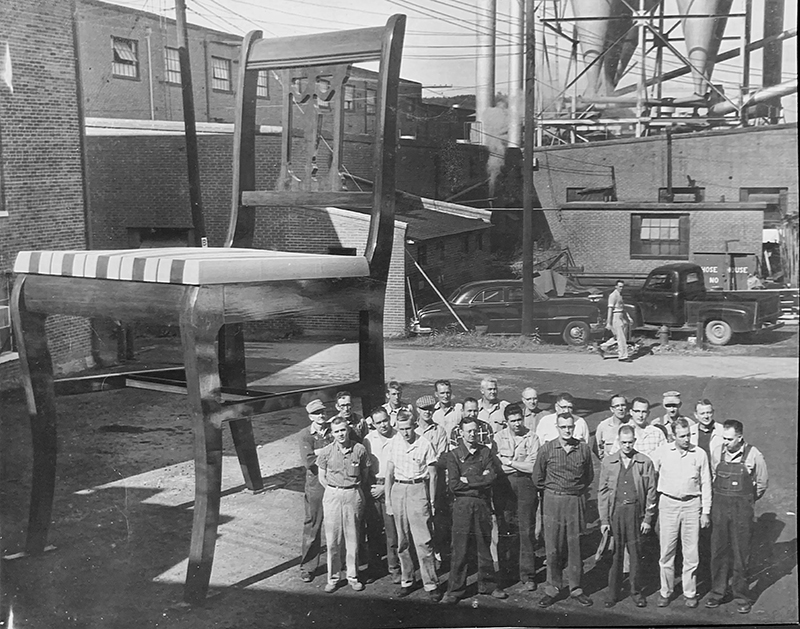
Workers pose with the Bassett Furniture Big Chair

In 1958, Bassett Furniture Industries designed and built a massive solid mahogany armchair—known as The Big Chair—as a promotional centerpiece for Curtis Brothers Furniture in Washington, D.C., one of Bassett’s largest dealers at the time. The idea was inspired by a similar oversized chair in Thomasville, North Carolina, which symbolized the dominance of Thomasville Furniture, a major competitor. Bassett’s objective was to construct a larger and more impressive version that could rival and surpass the Thomasville landmark.

The project was initiated by Ed Bassett, then president of the company. His sons, Eddie and Charles Bassett, were tasked with determining the dimensions of the Thomasville chair. They traveled to Thomasville, climbed the 12-foot base, and measured the structure by hand. When approached by a security guard, the brothers reportedly claimed they were NC State students working on a class project—a story that proved convincing enough for the guard to assist them.

With measurements in hand, the brothers returned to Bassett and collaborated with the company's lead designer, Leo Jiranek, to create a larger chair. Fabrication began soon after, and the project required approximately 1,100 man-hours to complete. The finished chair stood 19 feet 2.5 inches tall, was 9 feet 5 inches wide, and 12 feet deep, weighing 4,600 pounds. It was constructed from solid mahogany sourced from the Belgian Congo and could be disassembled for transport via bolts.

The chair was too large for railroad transport, so it was hauled by truck to Washington, D.C., in late October 1958. The chair was permanently installed on a five-foot pedestal in front of Curtis Brothers Furniture in the Anacostia neighborhood.

A formal dedication ceremony took place on July 7, 1959. The event drew media attention and was covered by newspapers and television outlets, with many referring to it as the “World’s Largest Chair.” The chair quickly became a local landmark and symbol of the furniture industry’s significance in the region.

The original wooden chair stood for decades before eventually deteriorating due to weather exposure. It was dismantled in 2005 and replaced with an all-aluminum replica in 2006, but the original remains a celebrated chapter in the company’s marketing and design history.

== Operations ==
Bassett Furniture Industries operates a vertically integrated business model that includes product design, domestic manufacturing, supply chain coordination, and direct-to-consumer retail. The company’s headquarters are located in Bassett, Virginia, and its primary manufacturing operations are based in facilities in Virginia and North Carolina. These plants support the production of a wide range of home furnishings, including bedroom and dining sets, custom upholstery, and occasional furniture.

As of 2025, Bassett operates approximately 60 company-owned retail stores across the United States, and licenses its brand to about 40 additional independently owned locations. In-store technology enables customers to personalize furniture by selecting from a range of fabrics, finishes, and configurations.

Bassett continues to emphasize quick turnaround for custom-upholstered furniture, often delivering within 30 days, enabled by its domestic manufacturing model and tightly managed production schedules. The company has also incorporated digital platforms, including online customization tools, augmented reality room visualizers, and integrated swatch sampling through its website.

In recent years, Bassett has streamlined its logistics operations by divesting its former logistics subsidiary, Zenith Global Logistics, and transitioning to third-party delivery partnerships. This move was part of a broader realignment aimed at focusing on core competencies in design, retail, and manufacturing.

== Leadership ==
Several descendants of the original founders continue to guide the company in key leadership roles. As of 2025, Robert H. Spilman Jr., a descendant of company founder J. D. Bassett, Sr., serves as President and Chief Executive Officer. He has held the role since 2000 and has led the company through industry globalization, the expansion of direct-to-consumer retail, and the development of digital customization technologies.

The company’s Chief Operating Officer, Jeb Bassett, is a descendant of C. C. Bassett, another of the company’s co-founders. In his role, Jeb Bassett oversees manufacturing operations, maintaining the company’s domestic production capabilities and supply chain modernization.

Several other members of the founding families currently serve in leadership positions. J. Tyler Bassett, a descendant of C. C. Bassett, serves as a Vice President. Robert H. Spilman III, son of the current CEO and a descendant of J. D. Bassett, Sr., also is a Vice President. Anne Spilman Souter, a daughter of the current CEO and a descendant of J. D. Bassett, Sr., serves as Creative Director.
