= Mr Bigg's =

Nigerian fast food restaurant chain

Mr. Bigg's
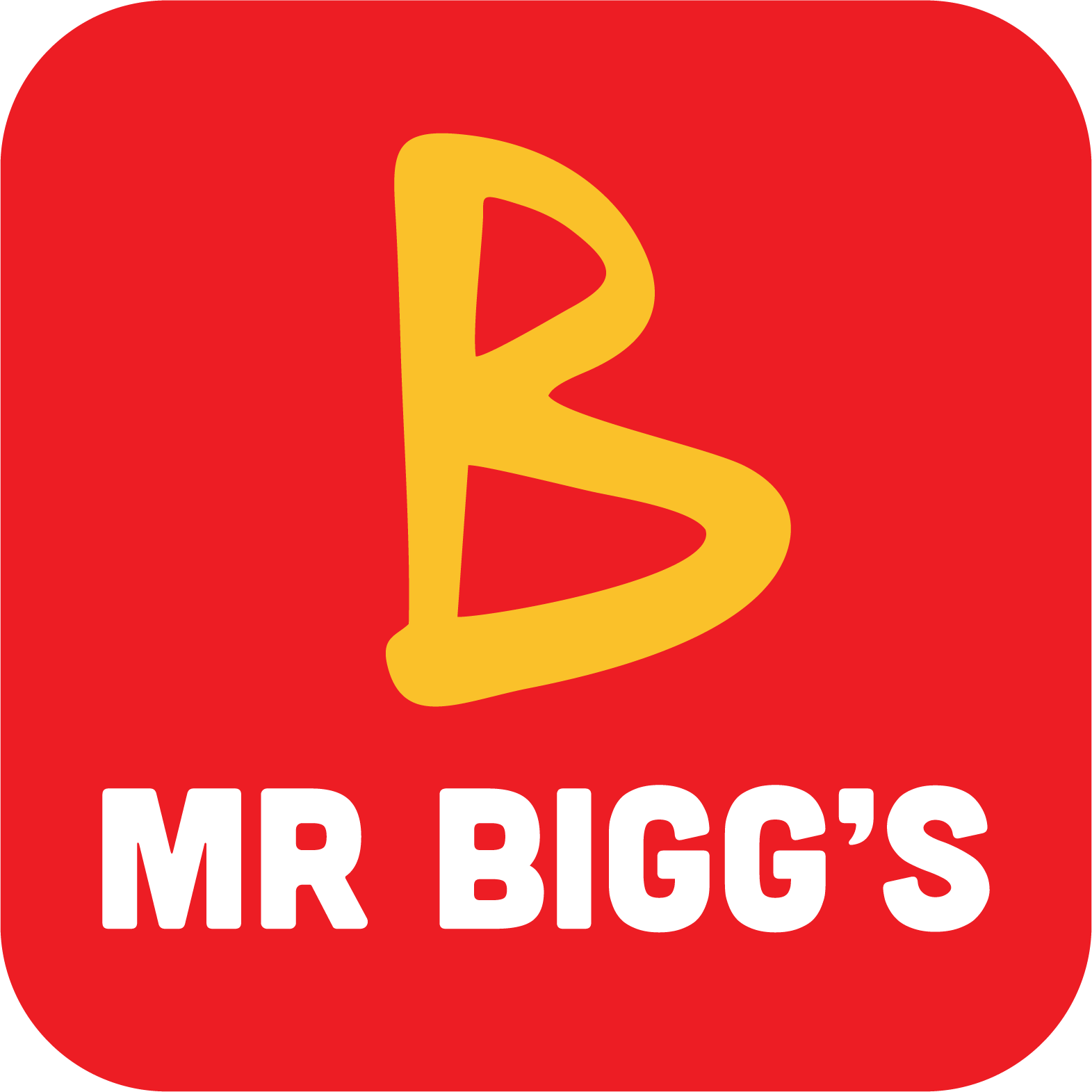

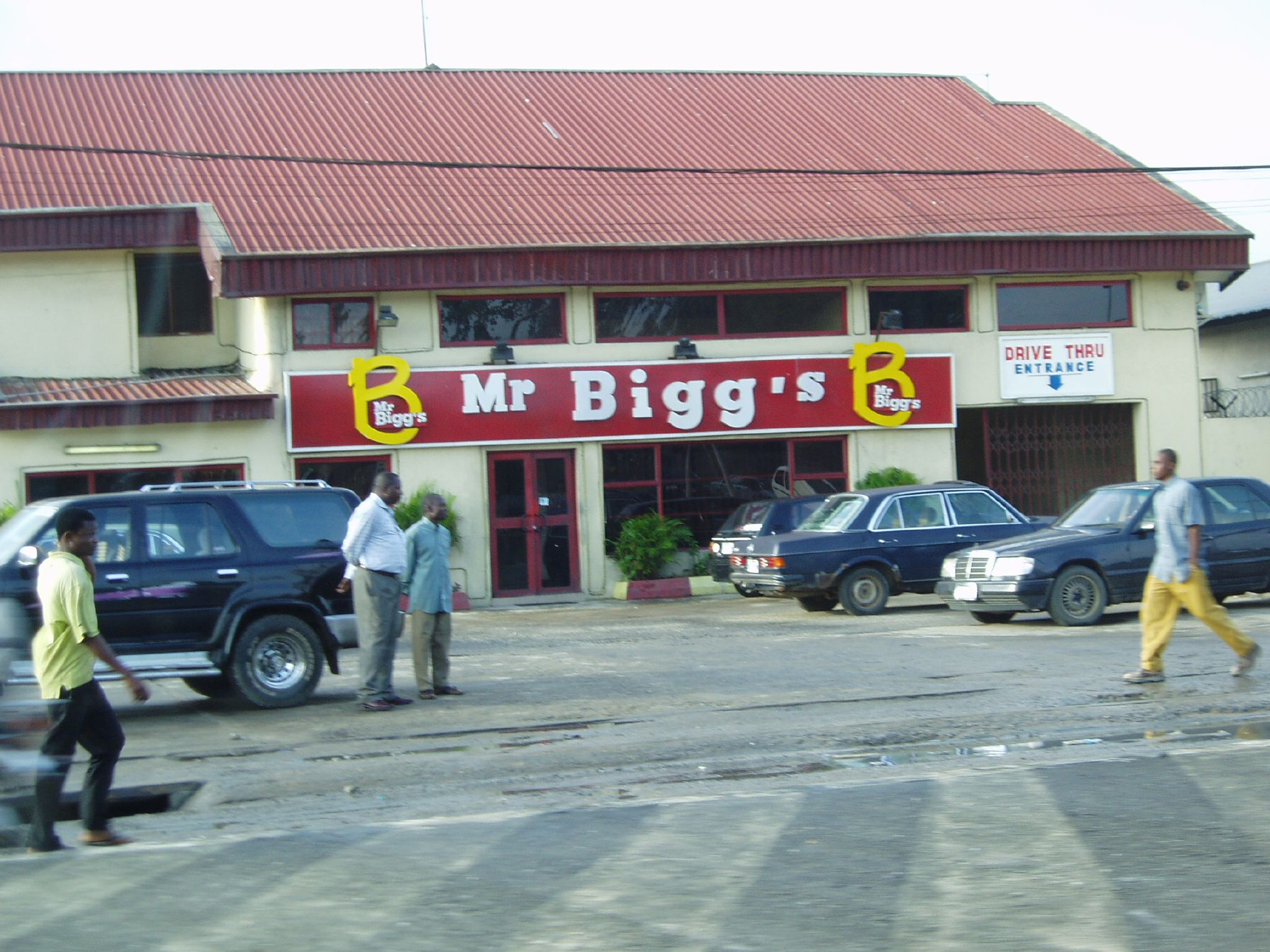
- Store with the classic logo
- Type: Public
- Industry: Restaurants
- Founded: 1973; 53 years ago in Nigeria
- Headquarters: Ojota, Lagos State
- Key people: Folasope Aiyesimoju (Chairman), Debola Badejo (Vice-Chairman), Ufuoma Ogeleka (General Manager)
- Products: Fast food, including Nigerian delicacies and UAC Foods-branded products
- Website: Instagram page

Mr Bigg's is one of Nigeria's fast food restaurants. Owned by Nigerian conglomerate United African Company of Nigeria PLC, there are currently 13 locations in Nigeria, including the country's first drive-through restaurant (Express Stores). In 2013, Famous Brands, South Africa, bought a 49% stake in the chain.

The restaurant is easily recognized by it's distinctive red and yellow color scheme and is especially famous for its meat pies. Mr Bigg's history begins with the coffee shops inside Kingsway Department Stores in the 1960s. In 1973, these shops were rebranded as Kingsway Rendezvous, which became Mr Bigg's in 1986. The chain saw rapid expansion after becoming one of the first Nigerian companies to sell franchises to investors.
