= Alcoa Power Generating =

American hydroelectric power provider

Alcoa Power Generating, Inc. is a subsidiary of Alcoa Inc., headquartered in Pittsburgh, Pennsylvania. Its three divisions were independent subsidiaries before being consolidated into Alcoa Power Generating, Inc. (APGI). These three projects have produced hydroelectric power and manage impoundments which also provide flood control; recreation, residential and business opportunities; and wildlife habitat.

== Yadkin Project ==
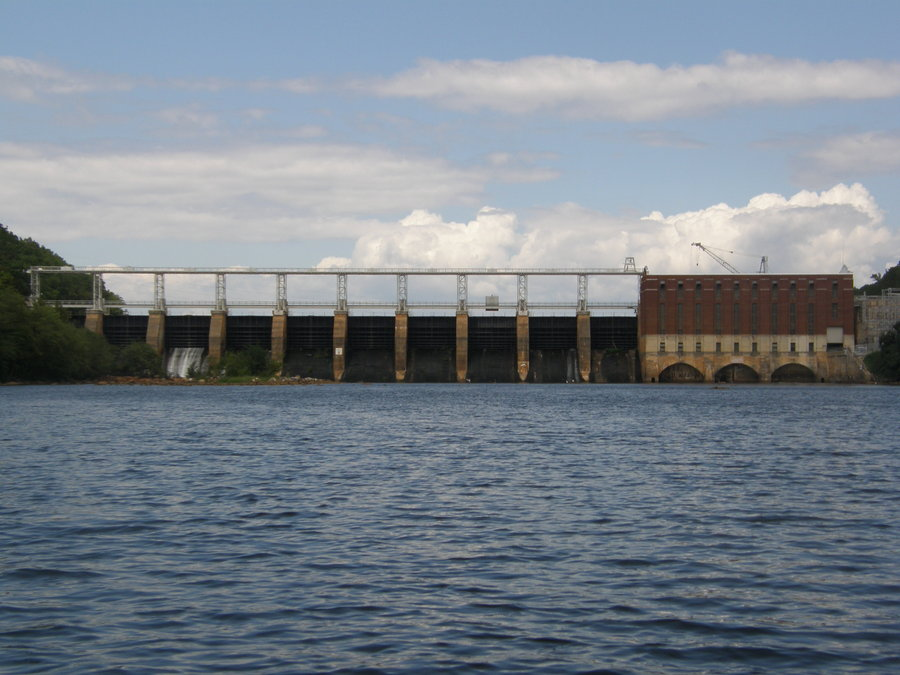
High Rock Dam. There are three turbines housed within the power house, with a total capacity of 39.60 MW.

The APGI Yadkin Project managed a 38-mile section of the Yadkin River, plus tributaries, in Piedmont North Carolina and included four dams, powerhouses and reservoirs, sold in February 2017 to Cube Hydro Carolinas. The counties of Davie, Davidson, Rowan, Stanly, and Montgomery border the Yadkin Project river and lakes. The dams owned and operated by APGI were the Narrows dam (completed in 1917), the Falls dam (completed in 1919), the High Rock dam (completed in 1927), and the Tuckertown dam (completed in 1962). The Narrows dam and powerhouse development is the only hydroelectric project listed on the National Register of Historic Places in North Carolina. The other three dam and powerhouse developments have been determined eligible for listing on the National Register.

=== History ===
At the Narrows, the Yadkin River flowed through a deep gorge for three and a half miles within the Uwharrie Mountains. Its potential for industrial development had long been recognized. In 1887, E.B.C. Hambley, a mining expert from England, came to Salisbury, North Carolina. He gained the backing of Pittsburgh industrialist George I. Whitney. Between 1899 and 1901, Whitney organized eight subsidiary companies and employed Hambley as his chief engineer. About a mile upriver from the Narrows, the Whitney Development Company nearly completed the granite Whitney Dam and a five-mile long diversion canal, and began construction of a powerhouse at Palmer Mountain before the company declared bankruptcy in 1907 and all work ceased. The massive canal remains today, while the Whitney Dam lies beneath the waters of Badin Lake. They have been determined eligible to be listed on the National Register. In 2017, Historic Salisbury Foundation board president Susan Sides said, "It was called one of the most unique dams in all history. It was referred to as the 'Niagara of the South.'"

In 1912, a French Company, L'Aluminium Français, acquired the assets of the Whitney Company. L'Aluminium Français decided against completing the Whitney project, and organized the Southern Aluminum Company to construct a 200-foot (61 m) high dam and powerhouse at the Narrows to power an aluminum plant which it would also build. West of the proposed smelter, the worker's village of Badin was planned and platted. The town was named in honor of the Southern Aluminum Company's president, Adrien Badin. The project faltered a second time as most of the French engineers returned to France during World War I.

In 1915, the Aluminum Company of America purchased the property. Plans once again were altered. The dam was redesigned and the new plans called for a brick powerhouse to be built on the east side of the river. The original powerhouse site on the west side of the river was abandoned and the partially completed building was dismantled to its concrete foundations. The original smelter site was also abandoned and a new smelter building was designed west of the Badin townsite. A devastating flood in 1916 caused damage and delays. When completed in 1917, the 185-foot (56 m) Narrows Dam was the world's highest overflow type dam. The Narrows Reservoir, commonly called Badin Lake, reaches a depth of 190 feet (58 m) and occupies 5,350 acres (2,170 ha).

To generate additional hydroelectric power, in 1919, the company constructed Falls Dam downriver of Badin and High Rock Dam upriver in 1927. High Rock Lake, at 15,180 acres (6,140 ha), was the largest lake on the Yadkin at that time. In 1929, the company's name was changed to Alcoa. In 1962, Alcoa built the Tuckertown Dam between High Rock and Narrows Reservoirs.

In August 2002, Alcoa temporarily suspended aluminum production at the Badin Works, laying off 377 workers. The electrode plant continued operating until 2007 when the plant shut down permanently. The dams continue to generate 215 megawatts of electricity annually which the company sells. During calendar years 2008, 2009, and 2010, the Yadkin Project generated an average of $7.73 million annually in net income, on an average of $29.46 million in annual revenues. In the year ending September 2013, APGI sold 964,216 megawatt hours, with revenue estimated at $30 million.

On July 11, 2016, Cube Hydro Carolinas, part of Cube Hydro Partners LLC, announced its purchase of the APGI power plants on the Yadkin River. Cube Hydro intends to improve the plants. APGI would still own 15,000 acres (6,100 ha) of land. On December 13, the Federal Energy Regulatory Commission approved the license transfer to Cube Yadkin Generation. The sale became official February 2, 2017.

In 2019, Ontario Power Generation acquired Cube Hydro and placed it into a subsidiary named Eagle Creek.

=== Hazardous waste ===
For more than 70 years, Alcoa disposed of spent potlining, which the EPA declared a hazardous waste in 1980. Alcoa took "corrective measures", but a Duke University Environmental Law and Policy Clinic analysis found "wastes from former smelting and disposal activities at Alcoa Badin Works continue to pollute the groundwater, surface water, and soil in the Badin community and Yadkin River basin". Surveys by Duke since 2018 show that polluted groundwater has reached the Little Mountain Creek floodplain, although Alcoa states its waste products have not reached Little Mountain Creek. Further studies were needed to determine how polluted other areas were. Duke believed trichloroethylene (TCE) was still in the groundwater at the main plant. Duke recommended studying "excavation and removal of the hazardous waste buried in Alcoa's dumps". In December 2019 Duke sent a report to the state Department of Environmental Quality.

=== Site redevelopment ===
In January 2011, Alcoa announced its commitment to spend $10 million to prepare the Badin Works site for redevelopment by demolishing buildings which would not be needed and making improvements to the facility. On May 23, 2011, Electronic Recyclers International, a recycler of electronic items such as computers and cell phones, announced plans to spend $5 million on a 165,000-square-foot (15,300 m^{2}) building. APGI will also spend $5 million. 535,000 square feet (49,700 m^{2}) of available space remains on the site. Clean Tech Silicon and Bar LLC also wanted to invest $300 million and create 450 direct and indirect jobs. However, negotiations between Clean Tech, APGI, and Stanly County Commissioners did not result in an agreement, and Clean Tech withdrew its offer.

In 2016, after APGI sold its power plants, the company said it will continue to market Badin Business Park.

=== Yadkin Project relicensing process ===
==== General information ====
A 50-year federal license to operate the dams on the Yadkin River was granted in 1958 to the Carolina Aluminum Company, a part of Alcoa, which owned the power plants and the land under the lakes, as well as significant land holdings around the lakes. The license was transferred from Yadkin, Inc. (an Alcoa subsidiary) to APGI in 2000. In 2002, APGI began an extensive relicensing process with four series of local public hearings held throughout the project area, and 100 representatives of over 30 stakeholder groups from federal, state, and local governmental agencies, and non-governmental organizations participating in Issue Advisory Groups and a lengthy settlement negotiation process. APGI commissioned 22 technical studies on the impact of the project in environmental, economic, recreation, and cultural areas. On May 7, 2007, APGI submitted a Relicensing Settlement Agreement which promised many benefits to the project area, signed by 23 stakeholders, to the Federal Energy Regulatory Commission (FERC).

In January 2007, the Stanly County Commissioners announced they would oppose APGI's relicensing because they were worried the company would not be forced to clean up environmental problems remaining at the site and in the Yadkin, and because granting the license to another entity, which would use the hydro-electricity created by the Yadkin River to create jobs, would better serve the public interest. In 2008, North Carolina governor Mike Easley authorized a study of the effect of APGI's relicensing. APGI supported this study, whose findings have not been issued.

In April 2008, FERC issued a Final Environmental Impact Statement (EIS) for the Yadkin Project, concluding that federal takeover would not be a reasonable alternative for the project, and noting that no federal agency had suggested that federal takeover would be appropriate, or had expressed an interest in operating the project. However, due to questions involving Alcoa's state water quality certificate, FERC has not made a final determination on the issuance of a license, and APGI has been operating under a temporary license.

In April 2009, North Carolina Governor Beverly Perdue issued a statement opposing APGI's relicensing and supporting legislation to establish a public trust to hold the license to use the Yadkin to generate hydro-electricity. With bipartisan support the N.C. Senate overwhelmingly passed legislation to establish the "public trust", but Alcoa supporters defeated the bill in the N.C. House.

A year later Republican Senator Fletcher Hartsell, again supporting establishing a "public trust", introduced a bill to create the Uwharrie Regional Commission.

In the final days of the 2010 legislative session, UNC-TV anchorwoman Eszter Vajda produced a documentary ("The Alcoa Story") about Alcoa's operations in North Carolina. However, before the program aired Ms. Vajda expressed concerns to legislators that, because criticizing a powerful corporation like Alcoa would be controversial, executives at UNC-TV might refuse to air her documentary. Subsequently, a Senate committee subpoenaed Vajda's documentary, sparking a debate over whether UNC-TV (which is owned by state government), was subject to 'public records' laws or whether it had a 'special exemption.'. The documentary was aired in the Senate Committee and then broadcast on UNC-TV (with a credit stating it was broadcast "without the usual editorial scrutiny").

After the documentary – focusing on Alcoa's environmental records – was broadcast, both the House and Senate passed Senator Hartsell's legislation to establish the Uwharrie Regional Commission.

Later, when additional public records released by UNC-TV revealed that an independent researcher working on the story for Vajda had accepted $3,000 from a supporter of establishing the public trust, and after learning Ms. Vajda had told legislators about her concerns UNC-TV might balk at airing her film, UNC-TV terminated Vajda's employment. It also removed online footage of her documentary.

Celebrity activist Erin Brockovich spoke for supporters of the Yadkin River Trust at a news conference in Raleigh, North Carolina. Later in the day, the Yadkin Riverkeeper sponsored her appearance at Wake Forest University.

The debate over Alcoa's relicensing and the establishment of a public trust has been contentious. In addition to the Relicensing Settlement Agreement signatories, APGI has gained the support, principally, of the N.C. Property Rights Coalition (which in June 2010 broadcast radio spots calling 'recapturing' Alcoa's license to control the Yadkin River a government takeover of private property); Rick Miller, President of the National Hydropower Association and a local newspaper editorial board. According to a poll paid for by APGI and done by McLaughlin & Associates, North Carolina's citizens are predominantly against the state taking over the project.

Stanly County was supported by Governor Beverly Perdue and her Commerce Secretary (a former president of the Stanly-County-initiated N. C. Water Rights Coalition), the Yadkin Riverkeeper, a number of elected officials and the NC Water Rights Commission which has aired internet videos about Alcoa's environmental record and rebutting Alcoa's property rights claims. Also supporting the public power agency is the nonprofit organization Central Park NC.

In 2013, Stanly County agreed to support Alcoa's license renewal.

On July 29, 2013, the state Department of Environment and Natural Resources recommended approval for relicensing. However, on August 2, the state filed a lawsuit claiming Alcoa did not own land under its lakes. The suit also asked that the state be granted rights to the dams. Governor Pat McCrory said, "The Yadkin River is a North Carolina river. We should be able to use it for North Carolina water needs and to create North Carolina jobs. The benefits of the Yadkin River belong to North Carolina's people." APGI believed it would prevail because of a 2012 United States Supreme Court decision in favor of a Montana power company. Another suit claimed North Carolina had owned the land since it was one of the thirteen original colonies. APGI lawyers claimed that the state could not use this argument because it had waited too long to do so.

On April 22, 2015, U.S. District Judge Terrence Boyle ruled that the Yadkin River was not navigable at the time of United States independence from Great Britain, meaning that the state of North Carolina would not have ownership of it from that time. This means the riverbed may have been included in land purchases by Alcoa and other companies that preceded it. Alcoa attorneys said the company did own the land and the state did not have a claim. A determination of who owned the riverbed was to be made in a trial.

On August 27, while asking attorneys questions that would help him determine whether to dismiss the 2013 lawsuit, Boyle accused North Carolina of acting like "a banana republic" and said the state was merely trying to punish Alcoa for taking away hundreds of jobs. Boyle dismissed the state lawsuit on September 28, saying the state had seven years to take action and did not do so until Alcoa's use of the property changed to something the state did not want. The ruling establishes that Alcoa owns the riverbed. The 4th Circuit Court of Appeals upheld the ruling in 2017. On February 20, 2018, the U.S. Supreme Court turned down an appeal.

On September 22, 2016, Alcoa received a license to operate until March 31, 2055, a period 12 years shorter than desired. The license requires a minimum water level and a swimming beach for High Rock Lake. The terms of the license will apply to Cube Hydro Carolinas, which bought the hydroelectric power operations.

As part of the relicensing process, 4700 acres, including 76 miles of shoreline on the Yadkin River, was being sold to the N.C. Wildlife Resources Commission and the LandTrust for Central North Carolina, on the condition that within five years they raise the $10 to $12 million to buy the land. LandTrust executive director Travis Morehead said 4300 additional acres would be purchased from Alcoa. All 9000 acres were part of the game lands program, and the sale would guarantee that this continued. In September 2019, phase one of what was called the Alcoa Lands Project was completed with the purchase of 2,463 acres and 45 miles of High Rock Lake shoreline for $7.7 million. A year later nearly 1000 acres were added at Morrow Mountain State Park. On September 13, 2021, the wildlife commission announced the $7.82 million purchase of 2,424 acres, 2,162 owned by Alcoa, in four counties, including 31 miles of Tuckertown Reservoir shoreline in Davidson and Montgomery Counties. The properties are now referred to as the Yadkin River Game Lands.

In January 2019, the United States Court of Appeals for the District of Columbia Circuit refused an appeal from the state, which had until April 18, 2019, to appeal to the U.S. Supreme Court but did not.

==== 401 Water Quality Certificate ====
The last remaining FERC requirement for a new Alcoa Yadkin Project license was Section 401 water quality certificate, and opposition to Alcoa's relicensing centered around it. In November 2007, the NC Division of Water Quality (DWQ) issued APGI a Section 401 water quality certificate for the Yadkin Project. The certificate was later withdrawn due to the failure of DWQ to publish a required public notice. APGI reapplied for a water quality certificate, which DWQ issued on May 9, 2009. In part, the certificate required APGI to make upgrades which would improve dissolved oxygen (DO) levels in the dam releases. Some upgrades have been made at the Narrows dam, although the complete upgrade program will not be completed until after the issuance of a license. Stanly County filed a legal appeal of the certificate and a court granted a stay of its execution. In October 2010, as hearings on the appeal took place, the state Department of Environment and Natural Resources reduced the amount of a surety bond required by the 401 water quality certificate from $240 million to $80 million, the amount APGI states will be required to make improvements required in the certificate.

Then, in the fall of 2010, lawyers for Stanly County and the Yadkin Riverkeeper confronted Alcoa executives with internal Alcoa emails documenting that Alcoa had withheld information and misrepresented facts about its pollution from the Department of Natural and Natural Resources. When the emails were made public DENR promptly revoked Alcoa's water quality certificate and, on December 2, 2010, Administrative Law Judge Fred Morrison Jr. suspended hearings.

On January 28, 2011, APGI released more internal documents and filed an appeal of the certificate revocation, stating "In its revocation notice, the DWQ quotes selected portions of e-mails that do not provide the complete story and were taken out of context. If you read the entire e-mail chains in context, and review the entire record, you find that no material information was withheld." APGI also released a study of dissolved oxygen levels leaving the Narrows and Falls reservoirs, where planned upgrades have been partially implemented. This report, Alcoa claimed, showed that, for the past three years, Falls tailwaters substantially met the state instantaneous dissolved oxygen standard over 99.5% of the time, and that in 2010 Narrows tailwaters met the state instantaneous DO standard 93.4 percent of the time. APGI also announced in January 2011 the establishment of an environmental toll-free hotline managed by EthicsPoint.

In a separate legal case, on May 3, 2011, a Federal Appeals Court in Washington, D.C. ruled against APGI, which had argued the state's actions were improper.

The state revoked the water quality certificate again in 2013 due to concerns over ownership.

In May 2015, administrative law judge Selina Brooks ruled that the Division of Water Quality did not have the right to deny a certificate and required a decision by the end of June.

Most who attended a state Department of Environment and Natural Resources public hearing on July 1, 2015, opposed a new permit, while Yadkin Riverkeeper Will Scott wanted higher standards.

On September 25, Wake County Superior Court Judge Bryan Collins said the state Department of Environment and Natural Resources wrongly denied a certificate and gave the department a month to grant it.

On October 23, the state said it approved the certification on the condition Alcoa provide $48 million for improvements. but on October 28, Special Deputy Attorney General I. Faison Hicks asked the Federal Energy Regulatory Commission to wait for a U.S. Fourth Circuit Court of Appeals lawsuit to be settled before making a decision about the 50-year license.

== Tapoco Project ==
The Tapoco Project (originally Tallassee Power Company) includes four dams in North Carolina and Tennessee, on the Little Tennessee and Cheoah rivers. The Tapoco Project comprises four developments: Calderwood, Cheoah, Chilhowee, and Santeetlah. The dams supplied power to Alcoa's operations in Alcoa, Tennessee, an aluminum smelting and rolling mill. TVA assists Brookfield Smoky Mountain Hydropower in determining the daily operation levels of the Tapoco developments to best match expected flow releases from Fontana Dam, since TVA's Fontana Dam serves as the primary flow control facility for the lower Little Tennessee River area. Combined, the four developments have a licensed capacity of 380.1 megawatts.

Around 1910, Aluminum Company of America began looking at locations to produce hydroelectric power for making aluminum. The company purchased Knoxville Power Company, chartered in 1900. At the end of 1913, Aluminum Company of America bought Tallassee Power Company (chartered in 1905), Western Carolina Power and Transportation, Union Development Company, and Union Power and Water Company. All of these companies became part of Tallassee Power Company. From the first two letters of each word came the name Tapoco, given first to the community and then to the company. The aluminum smelter first began operation in 1913.

World War I increased the need for aluminum, and Southern Railway completed a railroad extension to the planned Cheoah Dam in 1916. The Cheoah Dam began operation in 1919.

Construction of Santeetlah Dam began in 1926, with the Rhymer's Ferry powerhouse starting operation in 1928. Calderwood Dam was completed in 1930. Chilhowee Dam was the last completed, in 1957. The North Plant fabricating facility opened in 1942 to help meet the aluminum needs for World War II.

The company received its federal license to operate these dams in 1955 but was unable to renew until it resolved concerns over flooding in the Great Smoky Mountains National Park as a result of the Chilhowee Dam. The Tapoco Project and Licensing Act of 2004 corrected the problem by trading land, with 6,000 acres (24 km^{2}) going to the park and about 10,000 acres (40 km^{2}) of Alcoa land receiving a conservation easement. A 40-year license was granted January 25, 2005, but smelter production ended in 2009, and in 2012 the company sold its dams. Brookfield Renewable Energy Partners of Canada paid $600 million for the four dams, 86 miles of transmission lines, and 14,500 acres in 2012. Tapoco-APGI became Brookfield Smoky Mountain Hydropower on November 15 of that year.

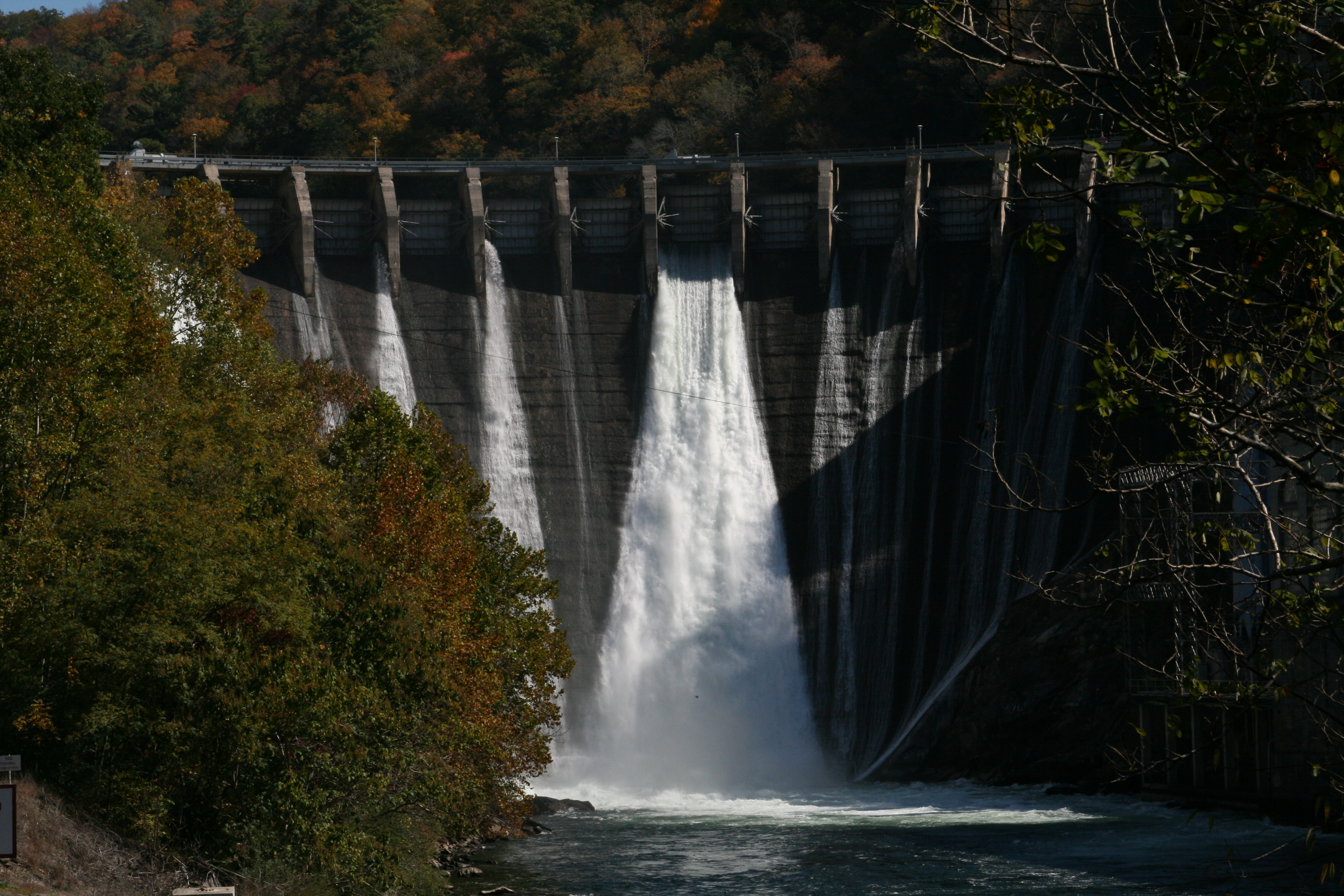
Cheoah Dam in Graham County, NC

The Cheoah Dam is also the dam used in the movie The Fugitive where Harrison Ford's character jumps to escape.

== Long Sault Project ==
Pittsburgh Reduction company, which became Alcoa, started the Massena operation in 1902 because of significant capacity for hydroelectric power; it holds the record for longest continuous operation of an aluminum facility. Power comes from the New York Power Authority (NYPA). Alcoa's Long Sault Division owns and operates the five 115 kV transmission lines that connect NYPA to Hydro-Québec, which originally connected NYPA to the St. Lawrence Franklin D. Roosevelt project. Alcoa pays Cedar Rapids Transmission Company (part of Hydro-Québec) to operate two of the lines.
