= Betty Creek =

Stream in Georgia and North Carolina, U.S.

Coordinates: 34°57′35″N 83°22′49″W

Betty Creek is a stream in the U.S. states of Georgia and North Carolina. It is a tributary to the Little Tennessee River.

Betty Creek was named after "Little Betty", a Cherokee woman.
