= Calderwood Dam =

Hydroelectric dam in Tennessee

Coordinates: 35°29′33″N 83°58′45″W

- U.S. National Register of Historic Places
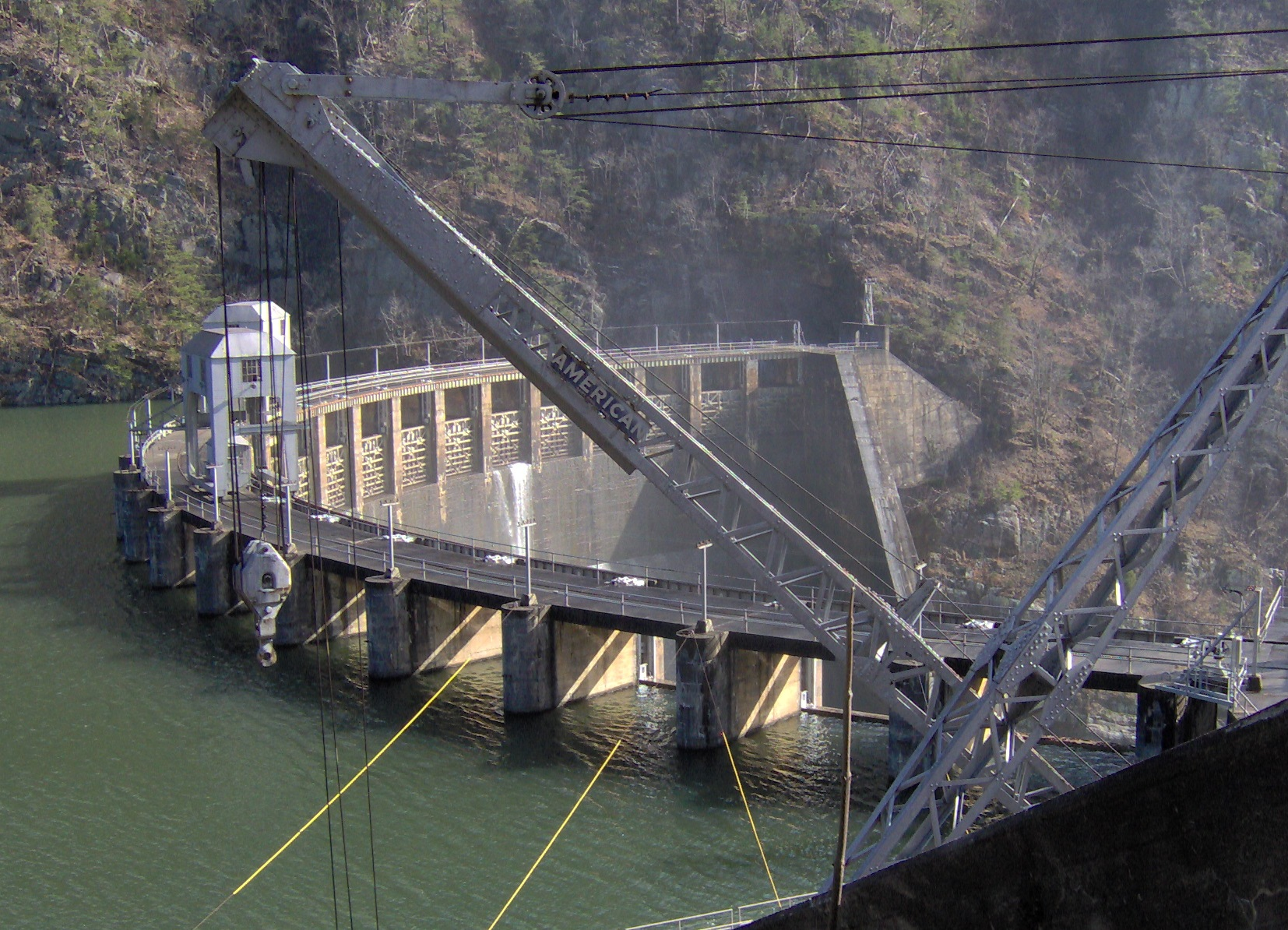
- Calderwood Dam
- Location: Blount / Monroe counties, Tennessee
- Nearest city: Maryville, Tennessee
- Area: 30 acres (12 ha)
- Built: 1930; 96 years ago
- Architect: I.V. Karpov
- MPS: Blount County MPS; Pre-TVA Hydroelectric Power Development in Tennessee MPS
- NRHP reference No.: 89001069 (original); 90001016 (increase)

Significant dates
- Added to NRHP: August 21, 1989
- Boundary increase: July 3, 1990

Calderwood Dam is a hydroelectric dam located along the Little Tennessee River in Blount and Monroe counties, in the U. S. state of Tennessee. Completed in 1930, the dam is owned and maintained by Tapoco, a subsidiary of the Aluminum Company of America (Alcoa), although the Tennessee Valley Authority (TVA) controls the dam's reservoir levels from Fontana Dam further upstream. Calderwood Dam is named for Alcoa engineer Isaac Glidden Calderwood (1871–1941), who supervised much of the company's early Little Tennessee River operations.

Calderwood Dam was one of four dams—along with Cheoah, Santeetlah, and Chilhowee—built in the Little Tennessee Valley by Alcoa in the 20th century to provide electricity to its aluminum smelting operations in Blount County. The dam was one of the last to be completed in the Tennessee River watershed before TVA took control of the watershed in 1933. Alcoa developed the community of Calderwood, Tennessee, just downstream from the dam to house construction and maintenance crews for its Little Tennessee Valley operations. In 1989, Calderwood Dam was placed on the National Register of Historic Places. The listing was expanded in 1990 and again in 2004 to include most of the dam's substructures.

== Location ==
Calderwood Dam is located approximately 44 miles (71 km) upstream from the mouth of the Little Tennessee River, which flows westward from North Carolina and empties into the Tennessee River. The area is surrounded by mountains on all sides, with the Great Smoky Mountains rising to the north and the Unicoi Mountains rising to the south. U.S. Route 129 runs roughly parallel to the Blount County side of the river, providing the only major road access to the Calderwood area.

The Calderwood complex graces a horseshoe bend in the river known as "The Narrows." The dam is located along the upstream end of this bend, and the powerhouse, service building, and old Calderwood community (now a recreation area) are located along the downstream end of this bend. The service building, recreation area, and historical community structures are accessible via Housley Road (gated at night), which connects US-129 to Growdon Road at the service building. Growdon Road continues past the service building to the powerhouse, although this section of the road is only publicly open to foot traffic. The Calderwood Overlook, located along US-129 just south of the road's intersection with Housley Road, provides a sweeping view of the Calderwood Reservoir. A gravel road, also open only to public foot traffic, connects the overlook to Calderwood Dam.

== Design ==
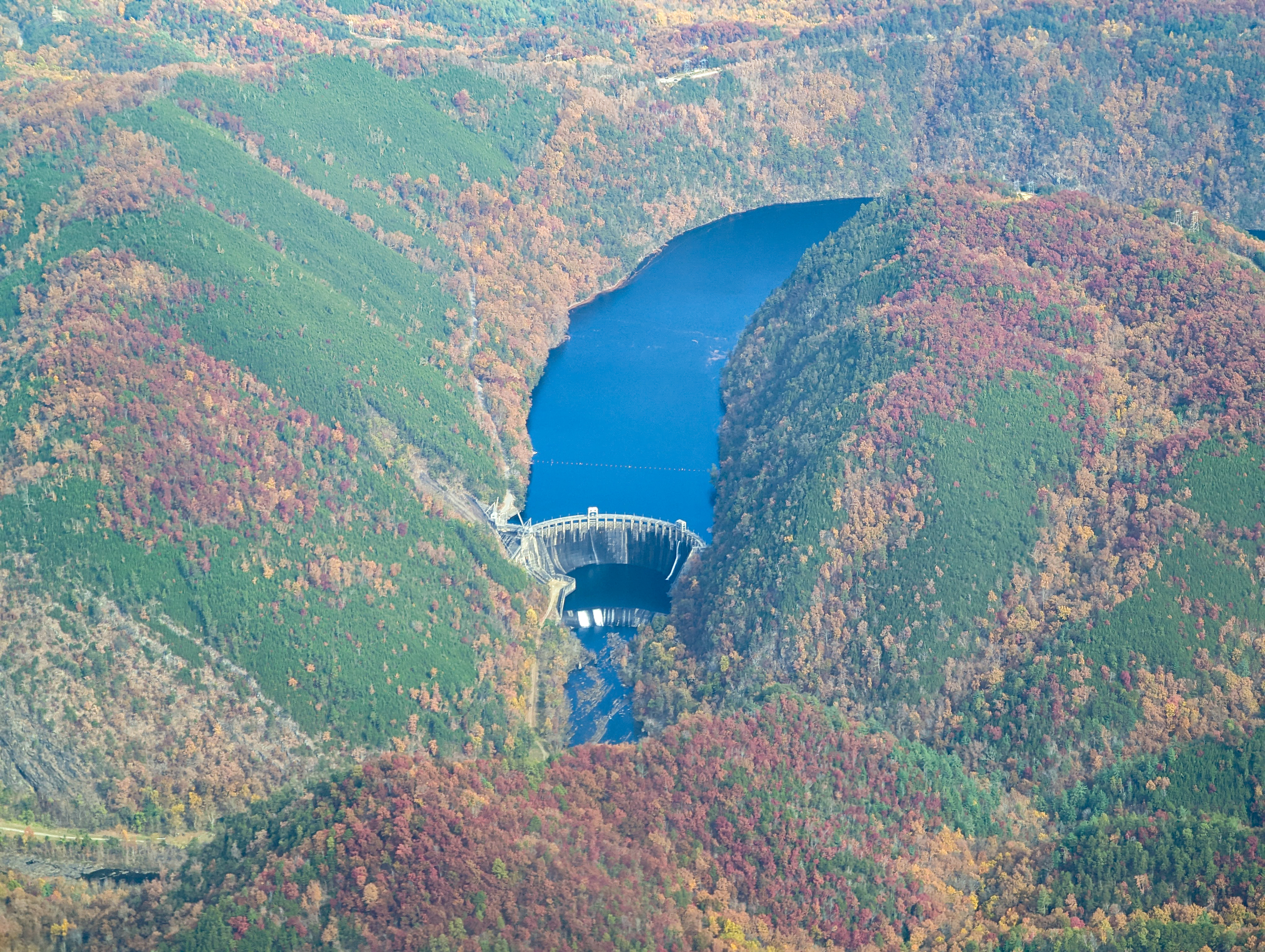
Elevated view of the dam

Calderwood Dam is a thin-section concrete structure 232 feet (71 m) high and 916 feet (279 m) wide, and has a 24-gate arched-crest spillway. A 40-foot (12 m) lower-gravity "cushion" dam is located 370 feet (110 m) downstream from the main dam, creating a pool of water that protects the riverbed. The pool's effectiveness is enhanced by a deflection unit at the base of the main dam.

Calderwood's powerhouse is located 1.2 miles (1.9 km) downstream from the dam, on the opposite side of the horseshoe bend in the river. A submerged intake just upstream from the dam diverts water into a 2,150-foot (660 m) concrete tunnel, which carries the water to the other side of the peninsula where it spills down three penstocks to a valve house. The penstocks measure approximately 18 feet (5.5 m) in diameter, and range in length from 330 feet (100 m) to 388 feet (118 m). The valve house is built of steel-reinforced concrete and is equipped with three Francis turbines. The powerhouse, a larger brick structure adjacent to the valve house, is equipped with three Westinghouse generators with a combined capacity of 140.4 megawatts. The powerhouse complex, located adjacent to a rockslide-prone slope, is protected by a V-shaped reinforced concrete wall.

Calderwood's reservoir covers approximately 570 acres (230 ha) with a drainage area of 1,856 square miles (4,810 km^{2}). The elevation of Calderwood Reservoir is 1087.8 feet (USGS), and the reservoir covers an 8-mile (13 km) stretch of the river. About half of Calderwood Reservoir lies in Tennessee, with the remainder extending into North Carolina.

== History ==
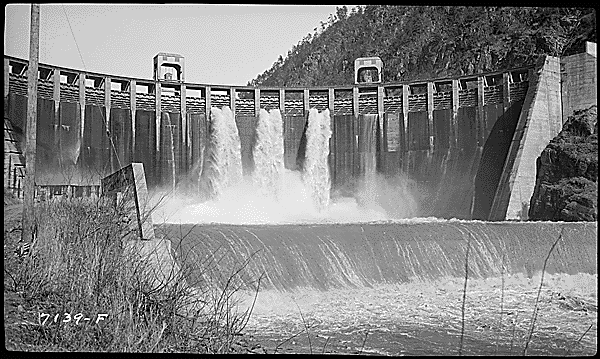
Calderwood Dam, photographed by TVA in 1939

Alcoa began developing the Little Tennessee Valley in 1909 to provide the enormous amounts of electricity needed to power to its aluminum smelting operations in Blount County. Superintendent I.G. Calderwood oversaw the extension of a railway line from Chilhowee to what is now Calderwood (railroad bridge support columns are still visible in the river just downstream from the dam). Southern Railway engineers had suggested that the construction of this rail line would take six months, but Calderwood and his team accomplished the task in just six weeks. The first of Alcoa's Little Tennessee Valley dams, Cheoah, was completed in 1919, and the second, Santeetlah, was completed in 1928. Preliminary work on Calderwood Dam began in 1918, but test drilling suggested the site might not be satisfactory. Subsequent tests confirmed the site's stability, however, and construction began in 1927. The first two generating units went into operation in 1930, and a third unit was added in 1938.

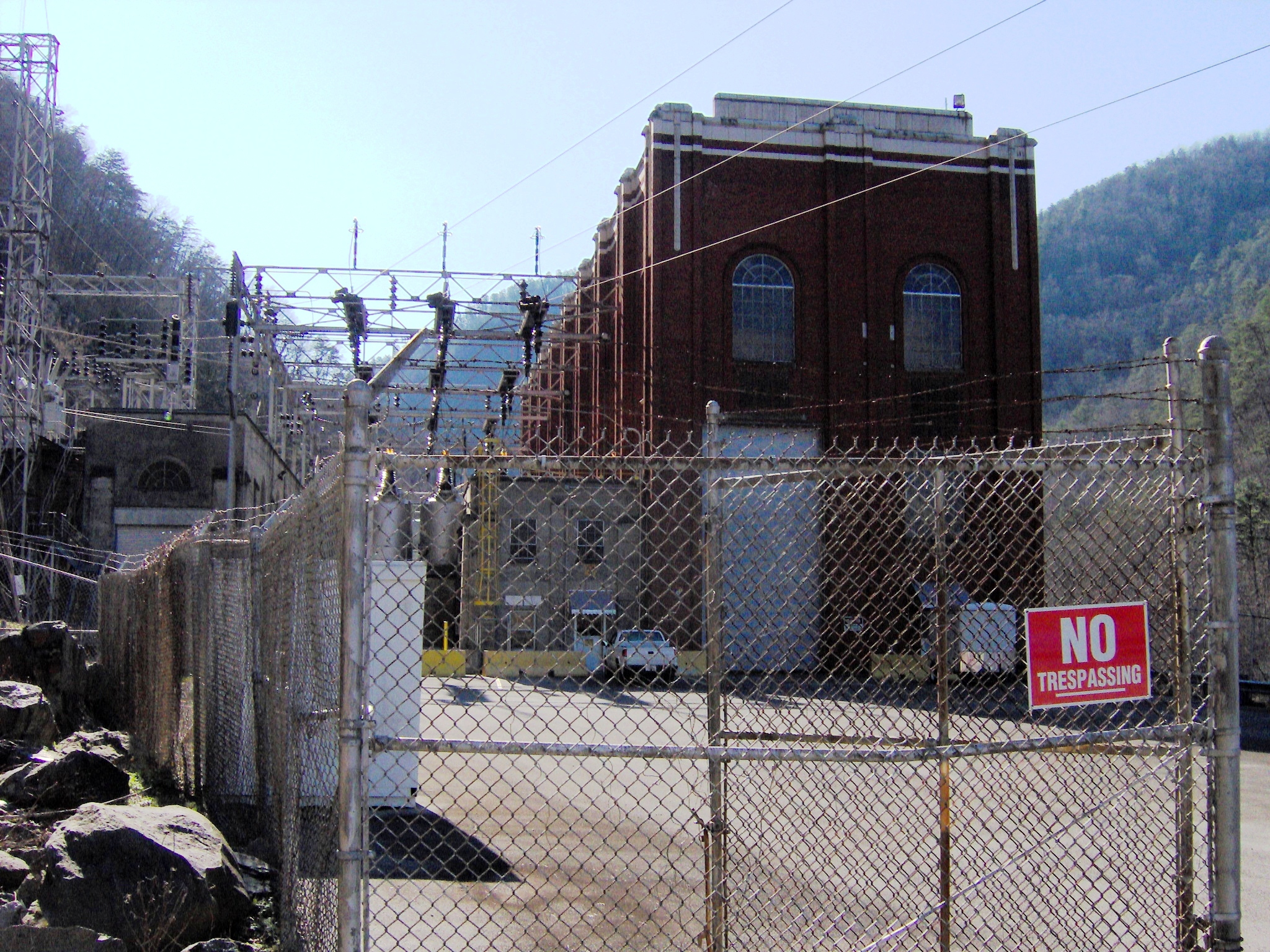
Calderwood's powerhouse

The "cushion pool" design of Calderwood was influenced by natural cascade waterfall formations. The dam's arched-crest design may have been influenced by the design of Ocoee Dam No. 1, which was completed in 1911 along the Ocoee River a few miles to the south. Calderwood's use of a conduit tunnel to carry water to a powerhouse further downstream resembles the Great Falls Dam complex, completed in 1916 on the Caney Fork in Middle Tennessee.

The community of Calderwood, Tennessee, located downstream from the dam and powerhouse, was developed in 1912 to house construction crews for Alcoa's Little Tennessee projects. This community was initially known as "Alcoa," but its name was changed to "Calderwood" in 1920 when the company reapplied its name to its main company town north of Maryville. The Calderwood community grew to include nearly two dozen houses, two churches, a school, and a theater, but as construction and maintenance crews were no longer needed, the community was largely abandoned in the 1950s. Its houses were all razed, but the school and theater (now used as storage) were added to Calderwood Dam's National Register listing in 2004.
