= Fontana Dam =

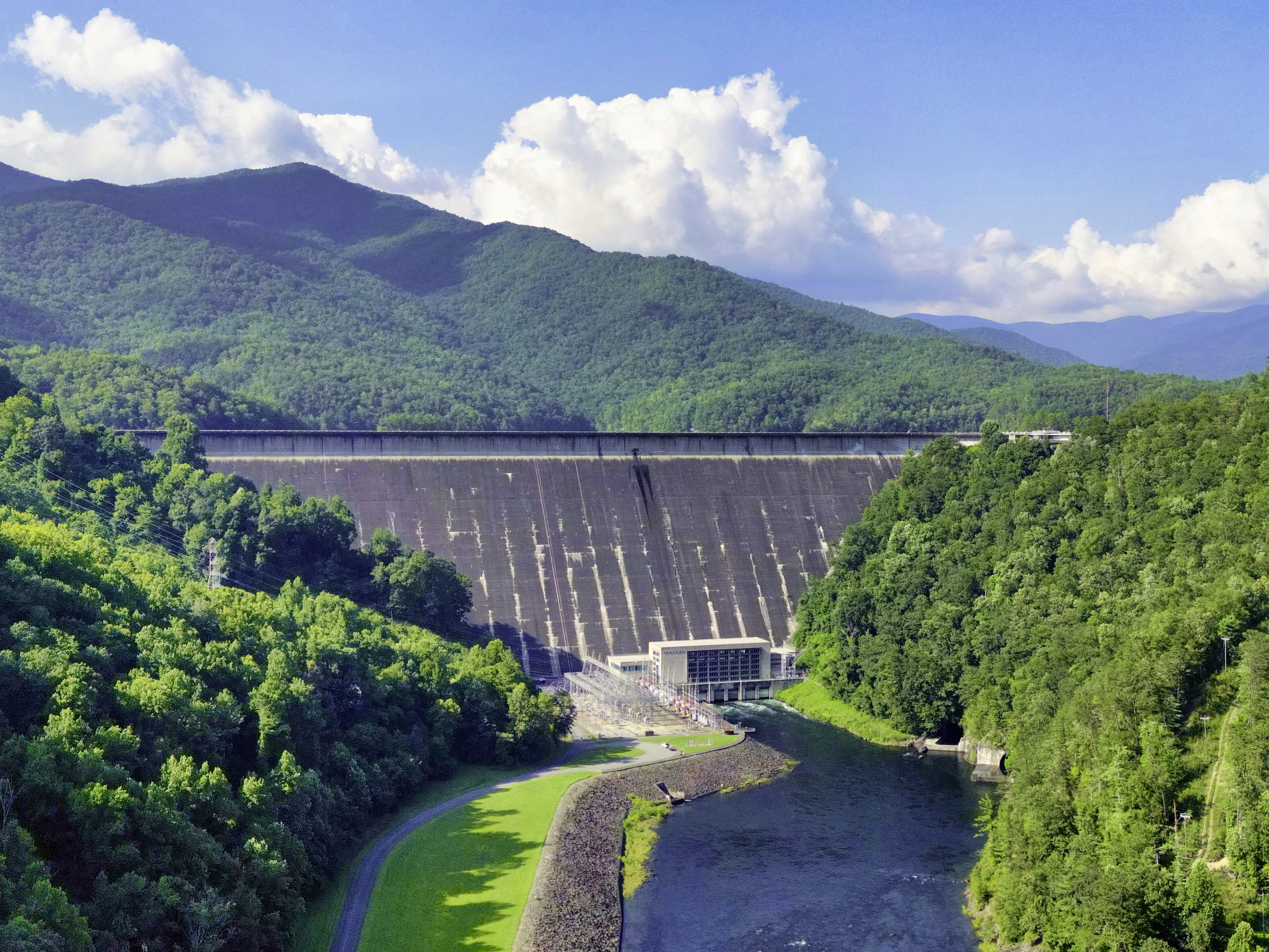
- Fontana Dam and powerhouse (aerial view)
- Interactive map of Fontana Dam
- Official name: Fontana Dam
- Location: Graham / Swain counties, North Carolina, U.S.
- Coordinates: 35°27′8″N 83°48′17″W
- Construction began: January 1, 1942; 84 years ago
- Opening date: November 7, 1944; 81 years ago
- Operator: Tennessee Valley Authority

Dam and spillways
- Impounds: Little Tennessee River
- Height: 480 feet (150 m)
- Length: 2,365 feet (721 m)

Reservoir
- Creates: Fontana Lake
- Total capacity: 1,443,000 acre-feet (1.780 km^{3})

Power Station
- Installed capacity: 238.5 MW

Fontana Dam is a hydroelectric dam on the Little Tennessee River in Swain and Graham counties, North Carolina, United States. The dam is operated by the Tennessee Valley Authority, which built the dam in the early 1940s to satisfy the skyrocketing electricity demands in the Tennessee Valley to support the aluminum industry at the height of World War II; it also provided electricity to a formerly rural area.

At 480 feet (150 m) high, Fontana is the tallest dam in the Eastern United States; at the time of its construction, it was the fourth-tallest dam in the world. The dam and associated infrastructure was listed on the National Register of Historic Places in 2017.

The dam impounds the 10,230-acre (4,140 ha) Fontana Lake, which spreads across a scenic stretch of the Little Tennessee along the southwestern boundary of the Great Smoky Mountains National Park. The Appalachian Trail crosses the top of the dam. Fontana is named for the now-inundated town of Fontana, a former lumber and copper-mining hub once located at the mouth of Eagle Creek. The town's name was derived from the Italian word for "fountain."

== Location ==
The Little Tennessee River flows for 135 miles (217 km) from its source in the mountains of northern Georgia to its mouth along the Tennessee River opposite Lenoir City, Tennessee. Fontana is located 61 miles (98 km) above the mouth of the Little Tennessee, in a remote area where the westward-flowing river bends briefly to the south. Fontana Dam is a 30-mile (48 km) drive from the three nearest cities — Maryville, Tennessee to the west, Bryson City, North Carolina to the east, and Robbinsville, North Carolina, to the south. The small resort of Fontana Village (which was first built as a temporary workers' village for people on the dam) has developed just south of the dam. The Great Smoky Mountains rise to the north, and the Yellow Creek Mountains (mostly protected within the Nantahala National Forest) rise to the south. Fontana is the uppermost of five dams on the Little Tennessee River: Cheoah Dam is 10 miles (16 km) downstream, followed by Calderwood Dam, Chilhowee Dam, and Tellico Dam. Cheoah, Chilhowee, and Tellico were all named for historic Cherokee towns.

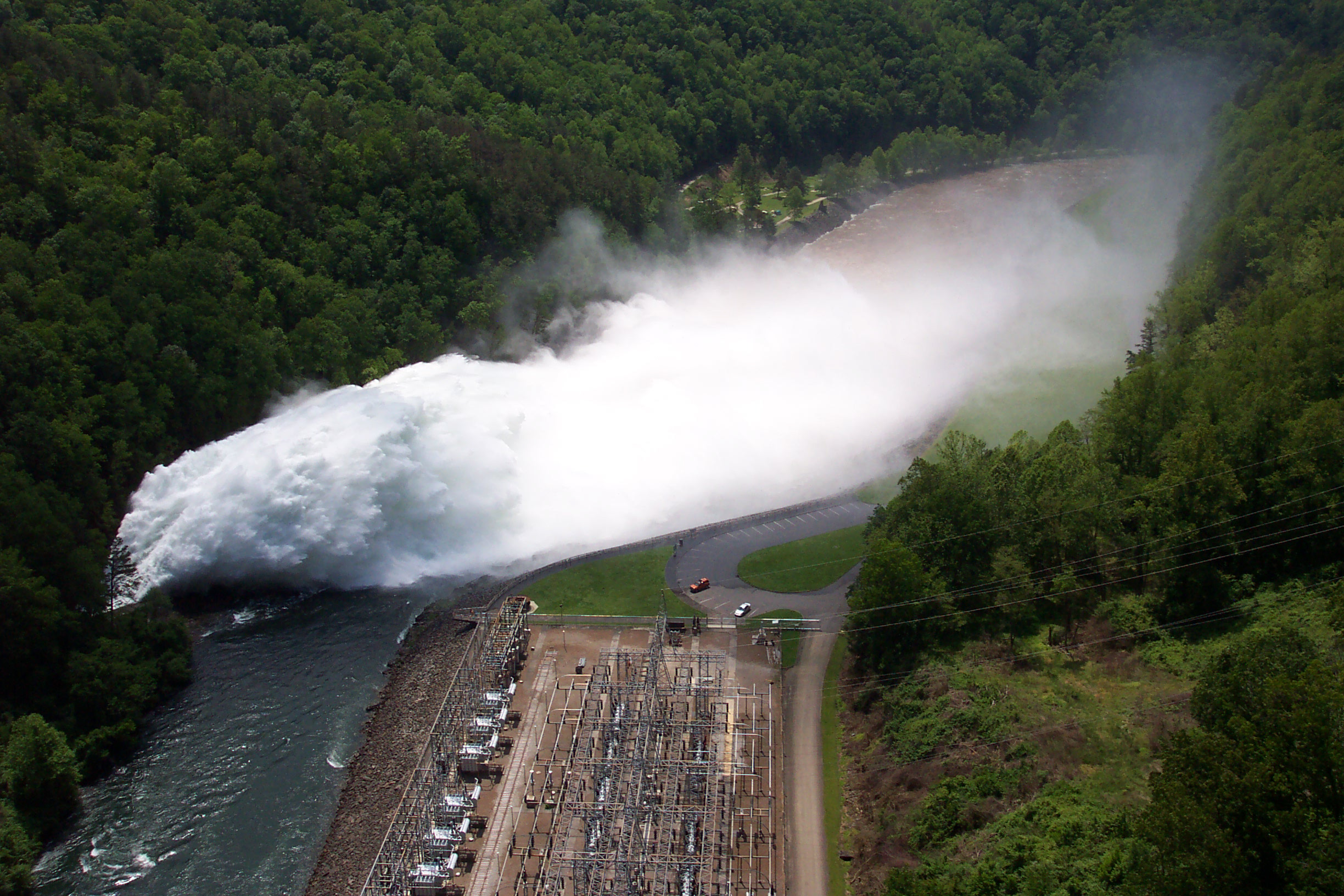
Fontana's spillway in operation

Along with covering a 29-mile (47 km) stretch of the Little Tennessee, Fontana Lake also extends across the lower 11 miles (18 km) of the Tuckasegee River (which flows southward from Cherokee and Bryson City), and the lower 5 miles (8.0 km) or so of the Nantahala River, extending into the scenic Nantahala Gorge. Several rapid-flowing mountain streams— some of which drop several thousand feet from the crest of the Great Smokies in just a few miles— empty into Fontana's north shore. The most notable of these streams — Eagle Creek and Hazel Creek — form substantial embayments just upstream from the dam.

North Carolina Highway 28 (which crosses a bridge downstream from the dam) provides the only major road access to the Fontana Dam area. At Deals Gap, 11 miles (18 km) west of the dam, the road intersects U.S. Route 129, which continues westward to Maryville. East of the dam, NC-28 follows the lake's south shore for about 25 miles (40 km) before intersecting U.S. Route 74.

The Fontana Dam site previously hosted an 800 mm (2 ft 7 1/2 in) narrow gauge funicular railway for tourists. This has been closed. The site offered daily tours until the September 11 attacks in 2001. As of 2026, public tours have been offered at the dam only twice, with participants selected through a lottery.

== Capacity ==
Fontana Dam is 2,365 feet (721 m) long and 480 feet (146 m) high, making it the tallest dam in the Eastern United States. The dam has a flood storage capacity of 513,965 acre-feet (633,966,000 m^{3}), and the combined capacity of its three generators is 293.6 megawatts. Fontana Lake has 238 miles (383 km) of shoreline and 10,230 acres (4,140 ha) of water surface, and its surface elevation varies by 57 feet (17 m) annually.

== Background and construction ==
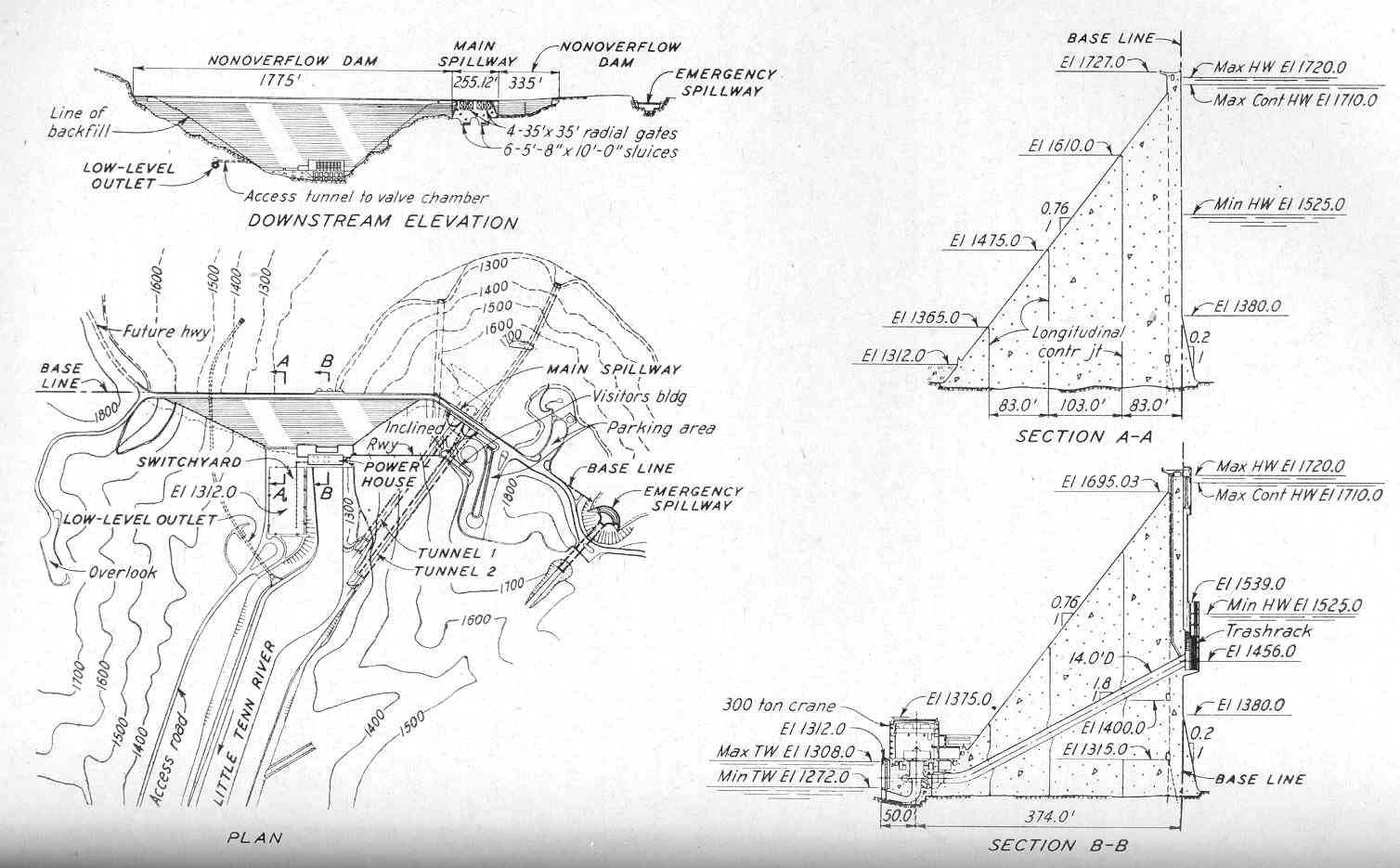
Design plan for Fontana Dam, circa 1941

The Aluminum Company of America (Alcoa) began investigating the Little Tennessee Valley around 1910 in hopes of finding a place for a water power source for the massive amounts of electricity needed at its aluminum production operations at nearby Alcoa, Tennessee. In 1913, Alcoa purchased the Tallassee Power Company (now Tapoco), and by 1930 the two entities had completed Cheoah and Calderwood dams, as well as Santeetlah Dam on the Cheoah River. By the mid-1930s, Alcoa had assessed the Fontana site and had purchased the initial 15,000 acres (6,100 ha) for the dam's construction.

In 1935, the Tennessee Valley Authority (TVA), which was concerned with the Little Tennessee's effect on flood control in the greater Tennessee Valley, began negotiating with Alcoa to assume control of the Fontana project. Although Alcoa preferred that TVA build the dam, TVA was unable to get necessary federal funding for the project until the outbreak of World War II in 1941. Emergency wartime initiatives called for a drastic increase in aluminum production. On August 14, 1941, TVA and ALCOA signed the "Fontana Agreement," which gave TVA possession of Fontana and control over the releases and output of Tapoco's Little Tennessee Valley dams, and in return guaranteed that Alcoa would be the primary benefactor of the dams' electrical output for at least twenty years. The U.S. Congress authorized funding on December 17, 1941, and construction of Fontana Dam began on January 1, 1942.

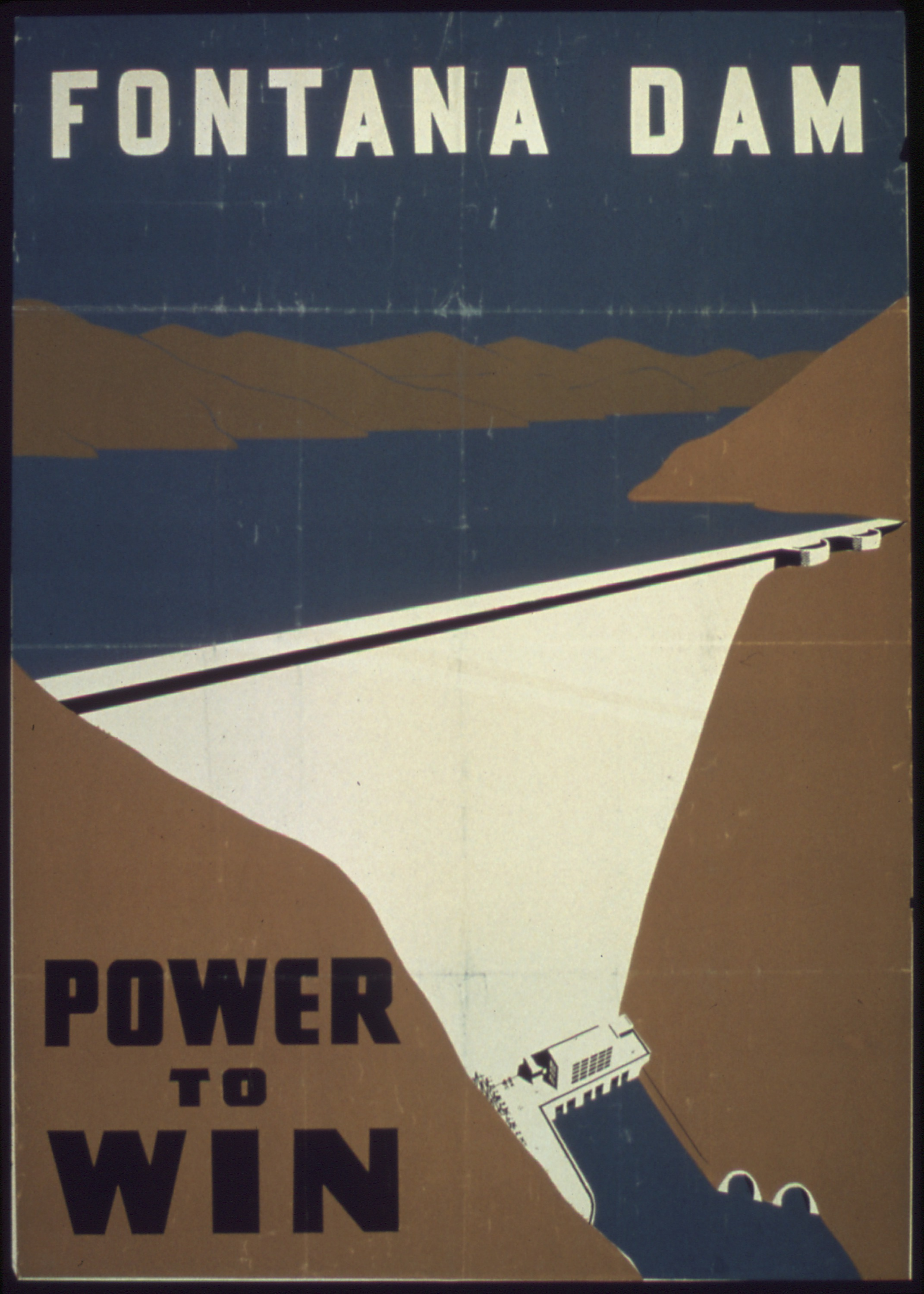
"Fontana Dam. Power to win." World War II poster

The building of Fontana Dam and its reservoir required the purchase of 68,292 acres (27,637 ha) of land, 5,125 acres (2,074 ha) of which were forested and had to be cleared. Some 1,311 families, 1,047 graves, and more than 60 miles (97 km) of roads had to be relocated out of the project area. The towns of Fontana, Bushnell, Forney, and Judson were completely inundated by the formation of Lake Fontana. The temporary village of Welch Cove (later renamed Fontana Village) was constructed just south of the dam to house the project's workers, whose numbers had reached 5,000 by 1943 in spite of nationwide manpower shortages. Fontana Village has been adapted and expanded as a summer resort; some of the original 1940s buildings still are used.

The design of the dam was unusual for TVA at the time. It was feared that the 2,818,000 yd³ (2,155,000 m³) of concrete required for the dam would create a structure so massive, that heat released during its setting would be trapped for years, and would eventually cause cracks to form. To aid the release of this heat, engineers divided the dam into construction joints and outfitted them with grout pipes and cooling coils. The dam's spillway presented another problem, as engineers were worried that the water's 400-foot (120 m) drop would cause erosion issues at the dam's foundation. A special spillway was thus designed that drains water out through two 34-foot (10.3 m) diameter spill pipes into a diversion tunnel equipped with a deflection system. The dam's design is largely the work of TVA chief architect Roland Wank.

Fontana Dam was completed at a cost of $70,420,688.48 (equivalent to $994 million in 2024), and the gates closed on November 11, 1944. Two generating units were placed in operation on January 20, 1945, in time to provide crucial energy for aluminum production in the closing months of World War II. Over 40,000 acres (16,000 ha) along Fontana Lake's north shore were eventually transferred to the Great Smoky Mountains National Park, and several thousand acres along the south shore were transferred to the U.S. Forest Service.

=== Cracks in the dam ===
Despite the innovative design of the dam, cracks were observed in the face of the dam in 1949. In 1972, additional cracks appeared and started to expand in 1973. Following extensive investigations, specialists determined that the cracks were caused by stresses in the curved portions of dam from thermal expansion. The cracking was exacerbated by alkali-aggregate reaction, which causes the concrete volume to increase and develop additional stresses. The area around the crack was post-tensioned with steel tendons, and an expansion slot was made in 1976 to alleviate the stresses developed within the cracked area. New slot cuts are made every 4–5 years to stop its growth. The last cuts were performed by Bluegrass Companies in 2016.

== North Shore Road controversy ==
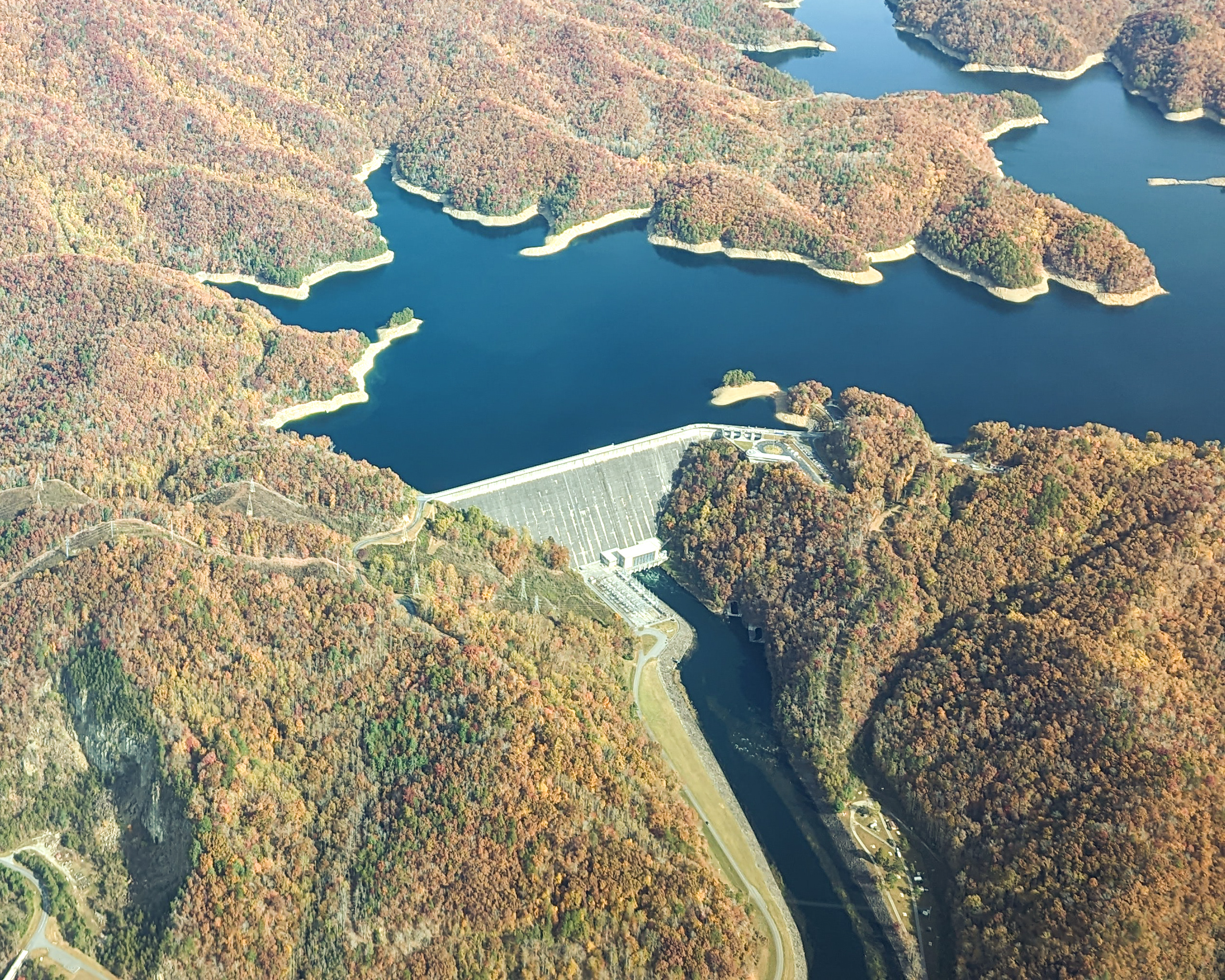
Elevated view of Fontana Dam

The construction of Fontana Dam led to the flooding of most of North Carolina Highway 288, which connected Deals Gap and Bryson City. The National Park Service, after gaining possession of Fontana's north shore tracts, reached an agreement with Swain County in the 1940s to replace the north shore road.

By 1972, only 7.2 miles (11.6 km) of the road had been completed. People in the area had more appreciation for the effect of such construction on the environment and raised challenges; in addition, the NPS had difficulty securing sufficient funding for the road. In the 1970s, environmental concerns completely halted the road's progress, and locals nicknamed the unfinished road "The Road to Nowhere".

North Carolina's U.S. Senator Jesse Helms finally secured funding for the road in 2000, and the NPS for the first time conducted a required environmental impact study of the project. Published in 2007, the EIS concluded that the road's construction would cause "major, adverse, long-term impacts to topography, geology, and soils" in the area. Proponents of the road argued that the environmental concerns were exaggerated.

In 2007, Swain County accepted a $52 million cash settlement from the National Park Service and agreed to drop its demand for a new road along the North Shore. The final installment of $35.2 million was paid on June 29, 2018. Under a 2010 agreement, the money was deposited with the state treasurer's office. Swain County can spend only the interest the money earns.

== See also ==
- Hazel Creek
