= Chilhowee Dam =

Hydroelectric dam in Tennessee, US

- Chilhowee Hydroelectric Development
- U.S. National Register of Historic Places
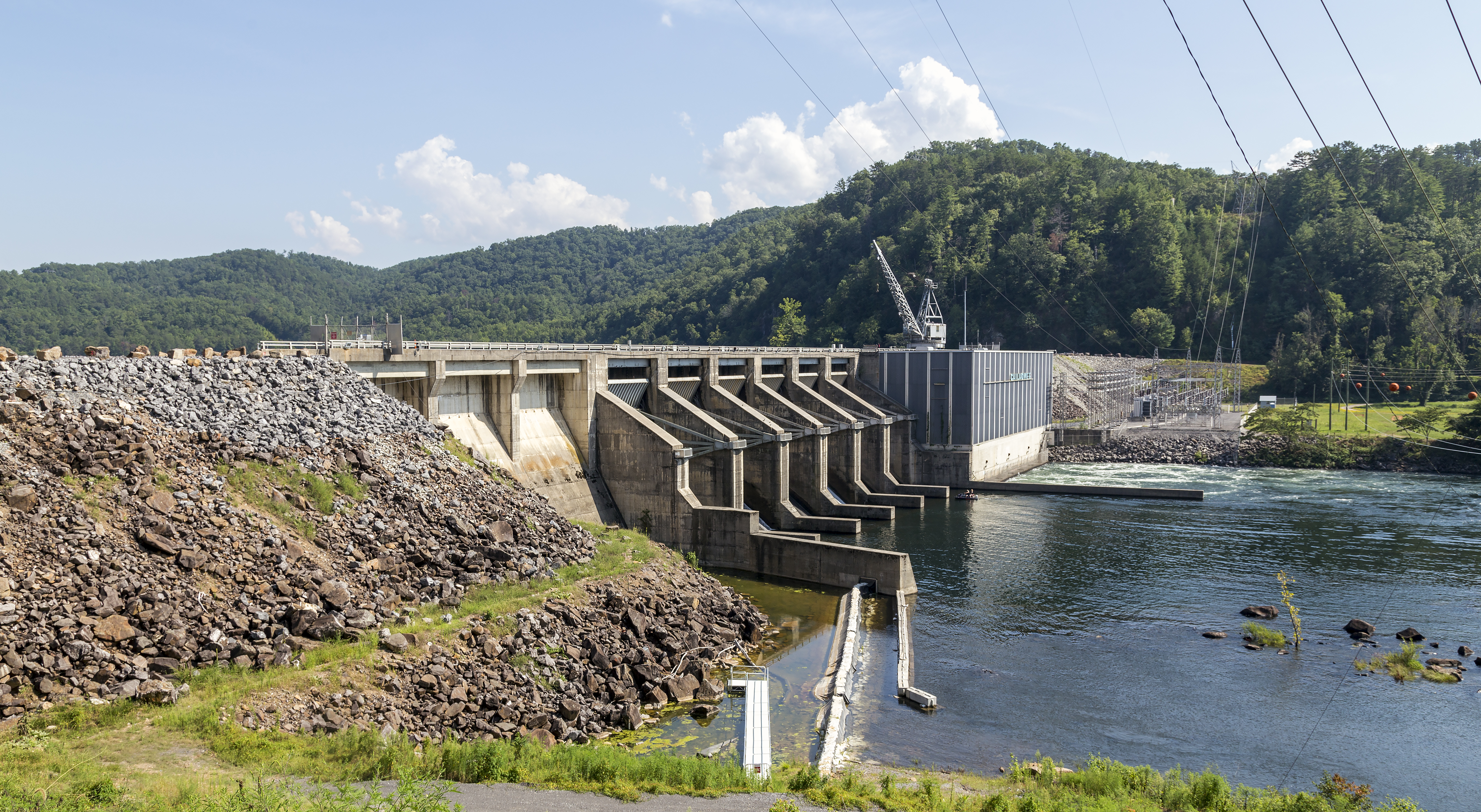
- Chilhowee Dam
- Location: Blount / Monroe counties, Tennessee, USA
- Nearest city: Maryville, Tennessee
- Coordinates: 35°32′44″N 84°03′01″W
- Built: 1957; 69 years ago
- NRHP reference No.: 04000546
- Added to NRHP: May 7, 2004

Chilhowee Dam is a hydroelectric dam located in Blount and Monroe counties, Tennessee, United States, between river mile 33 and 34 on the Little Tennessee River. Construction began in 1955 and was completed in 1957 to provide power for the operation of the Alcoa Aluminum plant in nearby Alcoa, TN. The dam is now owned and operated by Brookfield Smoky Mountain Hydropower. The dam's reservoir (Chilhowee Lake) covers approximately 1,734 acres (702 ha) at normal full pool and has a drainage area of 1,977 square miles (5,120 km^{2}). The elevation of Chilhowee Reservoir is 874 feet (266 m) above mean sea level (USGS). Chilhowee's powerhouse is equipped with three Kaplan turbines that have a combined generating capacity of 48 megawatts.

Like Calderwood and Cheoah, Chilhowee is controlled by Fontana Dam. Fontana Dam is the primary flow control facility for the lower Little Tennessee River. Tapoco built and operates the Chilhowee Development. Chilhowee Dam and its powerhouse are listed on the National Register of Historic Places as the Chilhowee Hydroelectric Development. When the lake is drawn down for maintenance, the remains of the original bridge of US 129 over Abrams Creek can be seen.
