= Santeetlah Dam =

Historic dam in North Carolina, United States

- Santeetlah Hydroelectric Development
- U.S. National Register of Historic Places
- U.S. Historic district
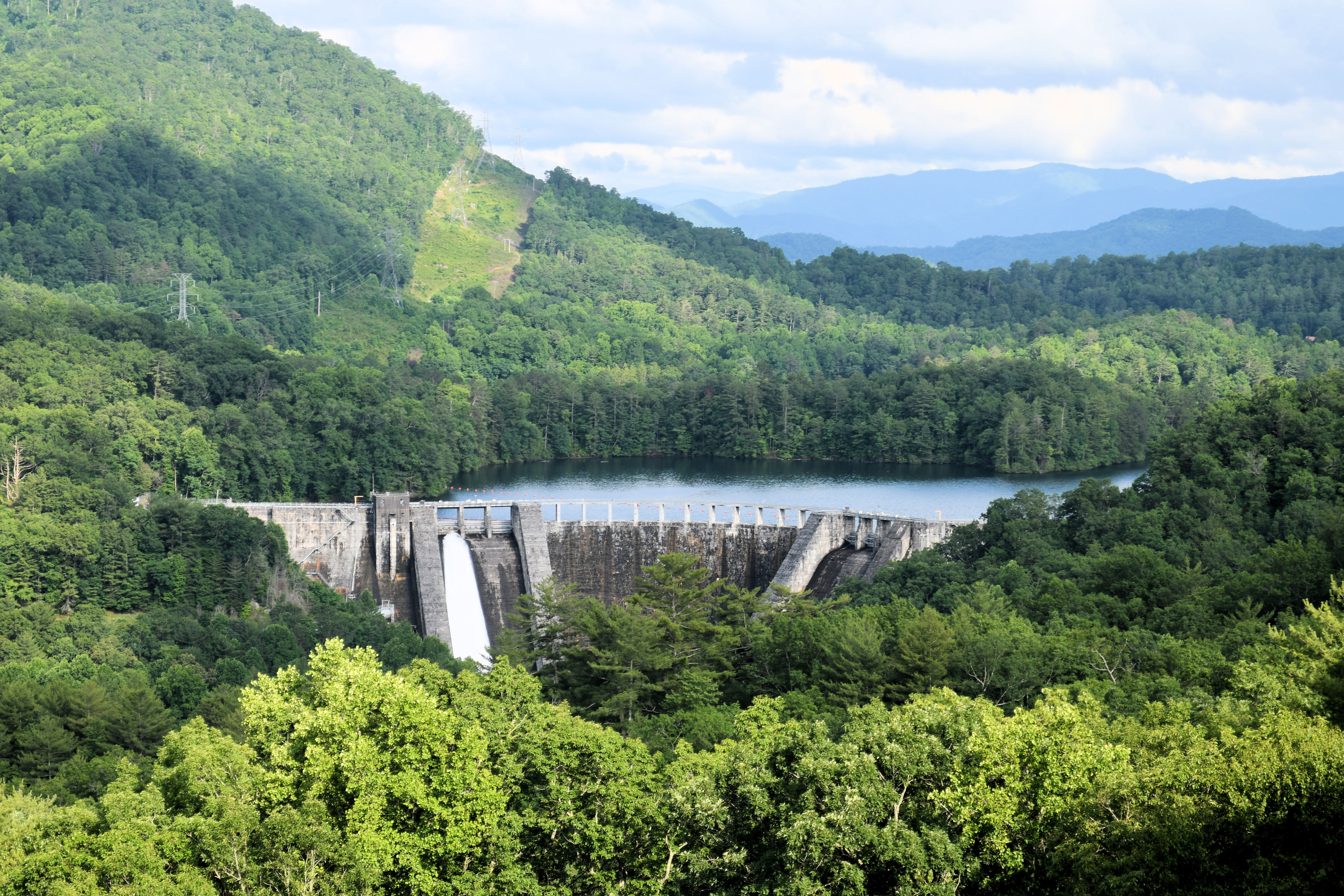

- Location within North Carolina Location within the United States
- Location: Dam-Hwy NC 1247, Powerhouse-1277 Farley Branch Rd., near Robbinsville, North Carolina
- Coordinates: 35°23′49″N 83°52′21″W
- Area: 397 acres (161 ha)
- Built: 1928
- Built by: Power & Engineering Group of Alcoa
- Architectural style: Classical Revival
- MPS: Tapoco Hydroelectric Project MPS
- NRHP reference No.: 04000466
- Added to NRHP: May 21, 2004

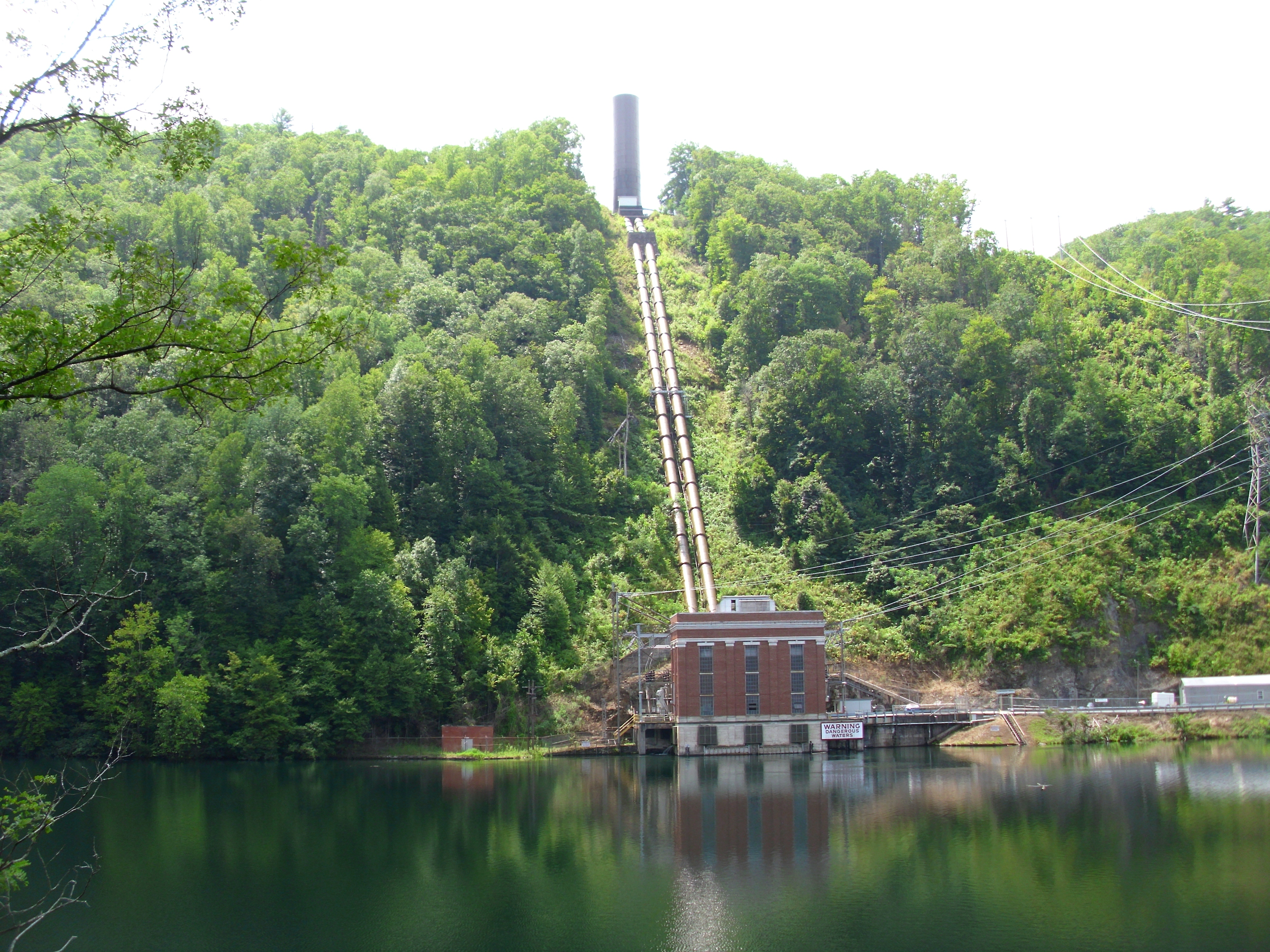
Santeetlah powerhouse on the Cheoah Reservoir

Santeetlah Dam is a hydroelectric dam on the Cheoah River (river mile 9) in Graham County, North Carolina. It, a pipeline/tunnel facility, and a powerhouse form the Santeetlah Development. The Santeetlah powerhouse is located on the left bank of the Cheoah Reservoir portion of the Little Tennessee River five miles (8 km) upstream of the Cheoah Dam.

The Santeetlah Project, which began in 1925, was completed in 1928 by the Tallassee Power Company (now Tapoco).

The Santeetlah Dam forms Lake Santeetlah, a reservoir which covers approximately 2,881 acres (1,166 ha), normal full pool area, with a drainage area of 176 square miles (460 km^{2}) and stretches to Robbinsville, North Carolina. The reservoir elevation is 1,940.9 feet (591.6 m) according to the USGS. The dam is 212 feet (65 m) high and 1,054 feet (321 m) long, and was one of the first structures built using vibratory damping to control concrete quality. It has two spillways with a capacity of 50,000 cfs. It is topped by concrete gatehouse which controls water flows into the five mile tunnel running to the Little Tennessee. The project's major elements were listed on the National Register of Historic Places in 2004.

The Santeetlah and Cheoah developments have practically flooded the Cheoah River. Water from Santeetlah is piped to the Rhymer's Ferry generating facility on Cheoah Lake, with any water flowing below the dam coming from downstream tributaries or reservoir overflow.

The facility is owned and operated by Tapoco. The Tennessee Valley Authority (TVA) maintains limited control over lake levels, as the piped output from Lake Santeetlah flows into Tapoco's Santeethlah Power House at Rhymer's Ferry upstream from Cheoah Dam and just below Fontana Dam. Overflow travels to the Cheoah River just below the Cheoah Dam.

== See also ==
- National Register of Historic Places listings in Graham County, North Carolina
