= Bluegrass Companies =

American demolition company

- Type: Private
- Industry: Non-Explosive Demolition; Engineering
- Founded: 1979; 47 years ago
- Headquarters: Greenville, AL (Headquarters); Broussard, LA (Registered office); Houston, TX (Registered office); Hanford, WA (Registered office); Dubois, WY (Registered office)
- Area served: Worldwide
- Key people: Nicholas Jenkins (CEO and Owner)
- Services: Diamond wire sawing, Concrete shaving, Robotic hammering, Expansive-grout supplier
- Number of employees: 50+ (August 2015)
- Website: Bluegrassbit.com

Bluegrass Companies is a non-explosive demolition company headquartered in Greenville, Alabama. It was founded in 1979 by CEO and owner Nicholas Jenkins. The business comprises the sub-companies: Demolition Technologies, The Machine Shop, Bluegrass Concrete Cutting Inc., and Bluegrassbit. Bluegrass Company has always been headquartered in Greenville, Alabama, though now incorporated in Wyoming. The company is known for the advancement of diamond wire sawing as a technique for non-explosive demolition, later for the creation and patenting of an underwater diamond wire saw, and for assisting the U.S. Department of Energy with various tests as well as nuclear decommissioning.

== Nuclear ==
=== Power plant decommissioning ===
Bluegrass has performed reactor vessel cutting and steam generator replacements at Sequoyah, Watts Bar, Browns Ferry, Waterford Nuclear Generating Station, Connecticut Yankee, Humboldt Bay, and Big Rock Point Nuclear power plants over the course of the last 30 years.

=== Plutonium Immobilization Project ===
The company has worked for the government of the United States of America: Department of energy on their Plutonium Immobilization Project, "After the low pour rate and instrumented canisters cooled, Bluegrass Bit, Inc. used a diamond wire saw to section them at four heights. The sections were then studied for evidence of hardware deformation and glass voids." This project focused on the finding a way to disposition excess plutonium of a weapons grade classification.

=== Diamond shaving of contaminated concrete surfaces ===
The company helped to test using diamond shaving to decontaminate radioactive surfaces.

=== Tokamak Fusion Test Reactor (TFTR) ===
In 1997, Bluegrass with the help of the Princeton Physics Laboratory offered a demonstration of how the TFTR could be disassembled with diamond wire sawing, "Based upon the demonstration at PPPL on the TFTR surrogate, the diamond wire cutting technology is superior to the baseline technology for both cost and safety considerations. The combination of void filling with this cutting technology will significantly reduce personnel radiation exposure through shielding, remote operation (normal application of this technology), and radionuclide stabilization".

=== ITER ===
In 2018, Bluegrass supported General Atomics by cutting a 1/4 scale mockup of the ITER solenoid constructed by wrapping 288 individual stainless steel bars with copper conductor and coiling the resulting "superconductor" into a ring 3 ft tall x 2 1/2 ft wide. The heart of the ITER tokamak, a solenoid is used to magnetically confine a plasma of reactive charged particles into a hollow doughnut-shaped container. The ring of stainless steel and copper was segmented into 4 pieces sized for shipment to another facility for analysis.

=== NS Savannah ===
Retired NS (Nuclear Ship) Savannah, anchored at Baltimore, MD, underwent a renovation in 2018 which required cutting into the nuclear containment vessel to gain access to the reactor. Bluegrass engineered and fabricated bespoke equipment for the confined space to cut, lift and move the 2 ton containment wall cut blocks. The removal of the cut segments had to all be done in a very confined space mostly by manual labor and an elaborate pulley system designed specifically for this job alone.

== Civil ==
=== Transportation: highways, railroads, ports, bridges ===
Railway bridge projects include a Union Pacific Railroad over the Willamette River in Oregon, and a BNSF pivot bridge over Bayou des Allemandes. Highway bridge projects include the Dumbarton Bridge in California and Wisner Boulevard bridge in New Orleans, LA. At the Port of Los Angeles, CA, an underwater wire saw cut Berth 29 for removal. On the demolition of the East Span of the San Francisco-Oakland Bay Bridge in Spring 2017, Bluegrass cut and segmented the above-water blocks of Piers E6, E7, E8, and E10 through E16, then core drilled for rigging and removal all the cut blocks except those on E6. The pier demolition project was authorized by the San Francisco Bay Conservation and Development Commission in part to mitigate for all the fill associated with construction of the new East Span of the Bay Bridge.

=== Hydroelectric ===
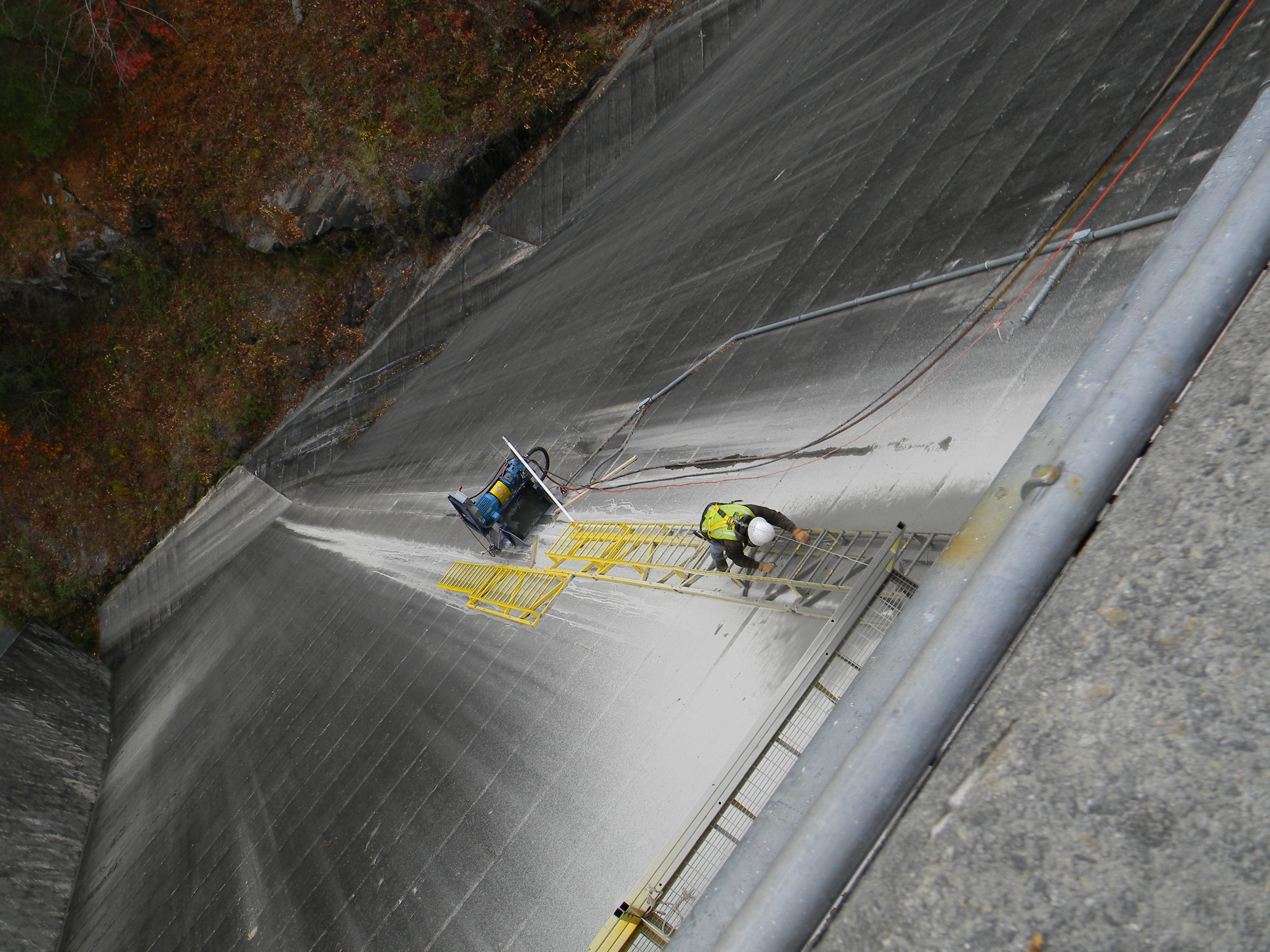
Bluegrass Slot Cut at Hiwassee Dam

Projects such as Hiwassee Dam and Fontana Dam have been a focus of the company as well, also see their work with Tennessee Valley Authority. With regard to dam remediation and upgrades, slot cutting projects are the company's main focus. It is akin to slicing a concrete dam like a piece of birthday cake. The technique is simple but very difficult, rotate a loop of cable strung with diamond embedded beads through the structure — essentially, like using a loop of fishing line to cut a cake. Slot cutting is employed to create expansion joints in dams afflicted with compression stresses due to concrete swelling. Alkali Aggregate Reaction, or AAR, is a chemical reaction in concrete created where the aggregate has a high silicon dioxide content. The southeast USA is one such region, and dams in that area require periodic slot cuts to avoid cracking, leakage, and interference with mechanical components such as gates and turbines. The time intervals depend on the AAR specifics of each structure, but 10 years is an average.

Bluegrass participated in the Saluda Dam Remediation project in South Carolina, a requirement by the Federal Energy Regulatory Commission which involved seismic upgrades to the dam and building a backup dam immediately downstream. Bluegrass was contracted to assist with removal of concrete piers and retaining wall to provide access to the penstock towers which supply water to the turbines in the hydroelectric plant. Bluegrass diamond wire saws were ideally suited to the job because of the minimal vibration emitted, therefore avoided the potential hazard of vibrating debris into the draft tubes. Expansive grout and robotic hammers were also used to break the concrete blocks for removal.

=== NASA ===
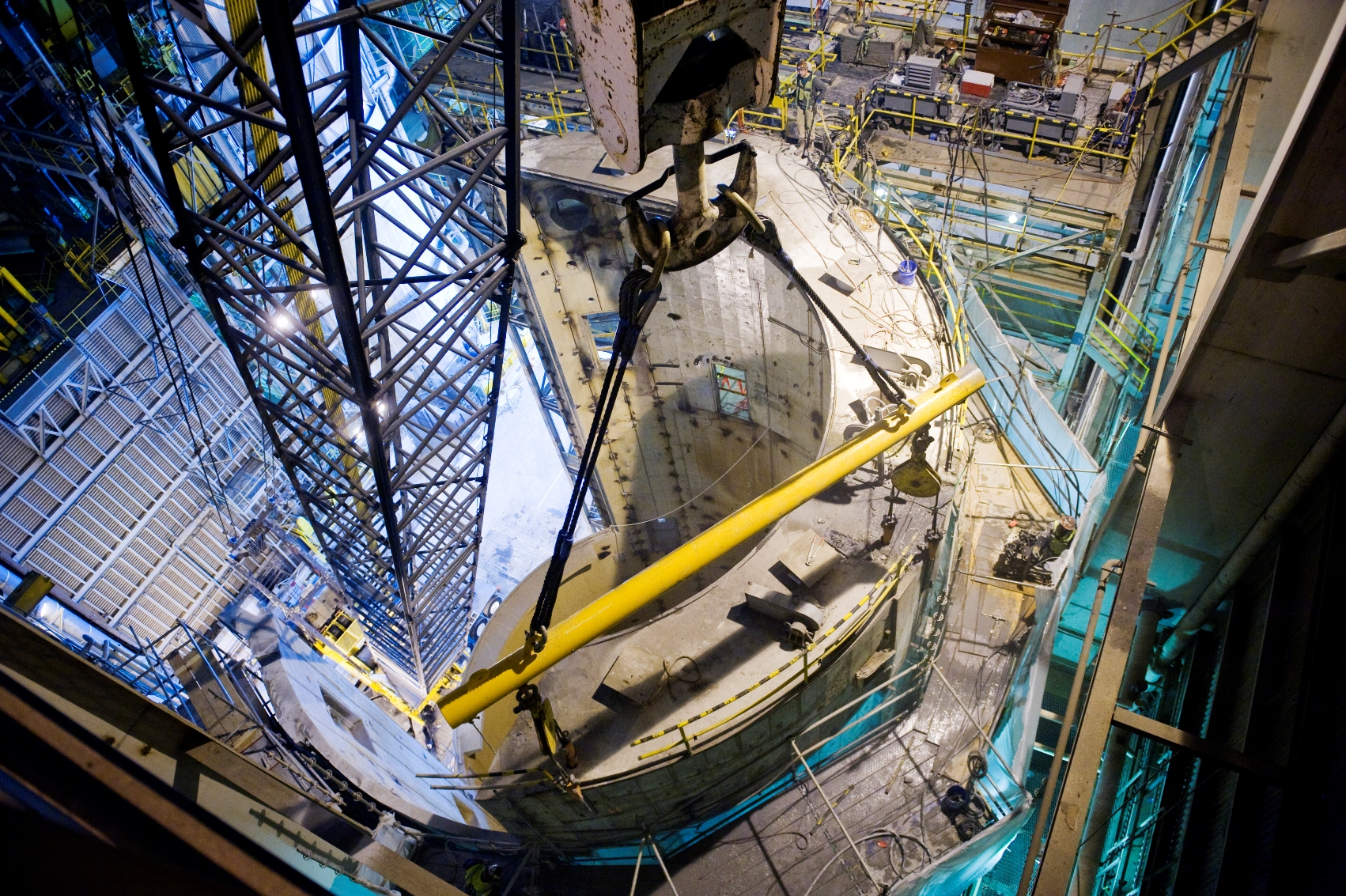
Cell B&C are demolished to make room for new SLS tooling.

As part of planning the Orion programme for the journey beyond low Earth orbit to destinations such as Mars, NASA needed to demolish the existing concrete silos (built to assemble the Space Shuttle booster rockets) at their Michoud Assembly Facility. This was necessary in order to replace the silos with larger Space Launch System (SLS) core stage assembly towers. The task of removing the existing concrete silos was estimated to take three months. Bluegrass was called in to regain schedule for the overall project, eventually completing the demolition of cells B and C in a month.

== Offshore ==
In 2006, Bluegrass created an underwater saw and had it patented for its use of hydraulic motors in combination with diamond wire to create a new sawing platform which was operational underwater. The continuous loop, four wheel drive diamond wire saw reduced cut times by providing greater torque and consistent wire grip. These improvements reduced slippage and subsequent wire breaks. Since then the patented underwater saw has been used domestically and globally on offshore decommissioning jobs including cutting single- and multi-string conductors, pipelines, seabed umbilicals, pilings, mooring chains, wellheads, risers, slot recovery and jacket lets. On platforms this technology can be applied to perform modifications, maintenance upgrades, to remove crane pedestals, compressors and topsides, and for hurricane remediation. Sub-sea saws can be installed by divers while being monitored and powered from a barge or platform, or they can be installed and powered by working class ROVs. The robust characteristics of these four wheel drive bespoke underwater wire saws, combined with remote control functionality, makes them suitable to extreme offshore decommissioning conditions such as the North Sea.

=== U.S. Patent #8,286,625 ===
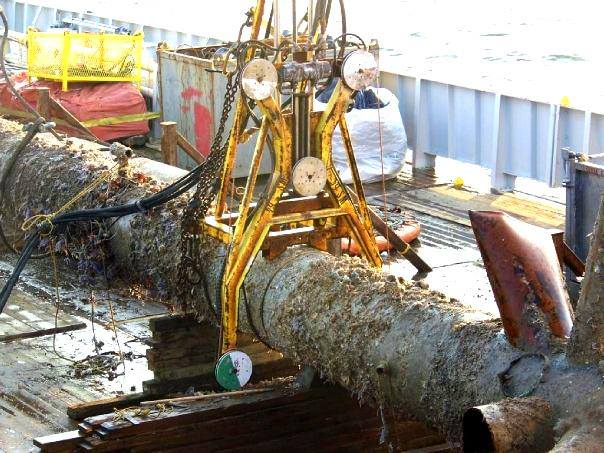
Bluegrass Underwater Saw

The patent was filed with the advantages being summarized as follows:

1. An advantage of the present invention is a diamond wire saw assembly that provides the ability to cut large diameter heavy walled multi-string pipes remotely, safely and quickly.
2. Another advantage is a diamond wire saw assembly that eliminates labor-intensive methods requiring the use of divers at extreme depths.
3. Another advantage is that the diamond wire saw assembly can be deployed by remotely operated vehicles.
4. Another advantage is that the diamond wire saw assembly can be used for removal of damaged offshore oil platforms as well as for decommissioning of oil platforms that have reached their useful life and are being removed.
5. Another advantage is a diamond wire saw assembly that is portable.
6. Another advantage is a diamond wire saw that eliminates wire breakage.

=== Hurricane remediation ===
Bluegrass was involved in the arduous post-Katrina and -Rita cleanup of toppled or damaged offshore production platforms. Operating from work vessels chartered by Chevron, the cleanup team moved from platform to platform in the Gulf of Mexico, cutting structural platform members, stringers and caissons underwater and on deck to comply with BOEM and BSEE federal requirements to remove O & G (Oil and Gas) production debris from the seafloor.

== Industrial ==
Examples of application to heavy industry include foundation removals and modifications, chest removals in the pulp and paper industry, brick and refractory removal primarily using robotic hammers, and boiler segmentation. In many industrial plants such as cement, lime, copper, aluminum, and chemical, the kiln's refractory lining wears out and needs to be replaced, or is compromised by lime buildup which must be removed. For these demolition jobs, remotely operated robotic hammers are used to break up the refractory for removal, and for chipping off lime deposits.

=== Paper mills ===
The production of wood pulp and paper products requires extensive concrete structures including foundations, walls, raised platforms and kilns. Refractory in kilns needs to be replaced periodically. A variety of maintenance, upgrade, retrofit, and replacement projects in this industry calls into service the full array of demolition equipment: core drills and diamond wire saws for cutting concrete bases, walls and foundations, and for releasing and cutting tanks and chests. Robotic hammers are able to work in the limited space of kilns to effectively break refractory and lime buildup for removal.

=== Chemical plants and refineries ===
The structures, mechanisms and environments of chemical plants and refineries are ideal candidates for the spark-free and vibration-free concrete and metal cutting technologies used by Bluegrass.

== Heavy metal ==
Los Alamos National Laboratories (LANL) Technical Area 54 contracted Bluegrass for assistance with a stockpile cleanup project. The inventory of 84" diameter exotic steel spheres needed to be segmented into sizes suitable for containment and disposal. Bluegrass designed a saw to these specifications: it had to make a continuous cut, without stopping, through steel nearly 3" thick, and to avoid creating contaminated slurry it could not be cooled with water, typically wire saws are cooled by water, thus the wire burned out quicker.
