= Abrams Creek (Tennessee) =

Stream in Tennessee, USA

Abrams Creek Tributary to Little Tennessee River
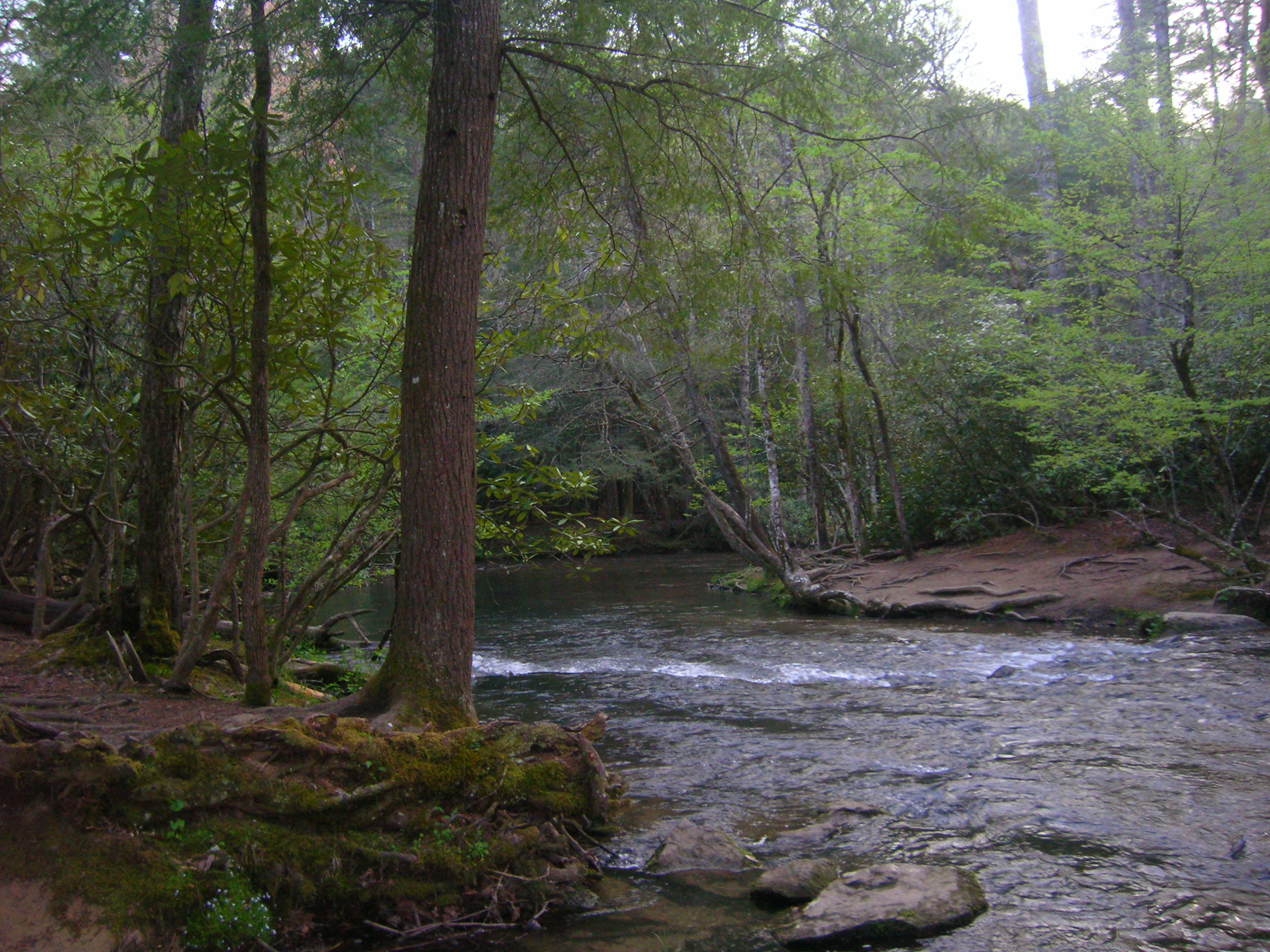
- Abrams Creek near Trailhead

- Location of Abrams Creek mouth Abrams Creek (Tennessee) (the United States)

Location
- Country: United States
- State: Tennessee
- County: Blount

Physical characteristics
- Source: confluence of Anthony Creek and Left Prong Anthony Creek
  - location: west of Cold Water Knob
  - coordinates: 35°35′20″N 083°45′28″W
  - elevation: 2,440 ft (740 m)
- Mouth: Little Tennessee River
  - location: about 5 miles north of Calderwood, Tennessee
  - coordinates: 35°33′20″N 083°59′56″W
  - elevation: 874 ft (266 m)
- Length: 27.60 mi (44.42 km)
- Basin size: 87.14 square miles (225.7 km^{2})
- Discharge
  - location: Little Tennessee River
  - average: 215.53 cu ft/s (6.103 m^{3}/s) at mouth with Little Tennessee River

Basin features
- Progression: Little Tennessee River → Tennessee River → Ohio River → Mississippi River → Gulf of Mexico
- River system: Ohio River
- Tributaries
  - left: Left Prong Anthony Creek, Maywood Creek, Sea Branch, Maple Branch, McCaulley Branch, Cades Branch, Whistling Branch, Mill Creek, More Licker Branch, Law Branch, McCully Branch, Pardon Branch, Mill Branch, Shoofly Branch, Huckleberry Branch, Panther Creek
  - right: Anthony Creek, Green Branch, Crooked Arm Branch, Harrison Branch, Marthas Branch, Feezell Branch, Tater Branch, Arbutus Branch, Stony Branch, Kreider Branch, Oak Flats Branch, Mill Branch, Buck Shank Branch, Kingfisher Creek, Bell Branch, Mill Creek
- Bridges: Cades Cove Loop Road, Sparks Lane, Hyatt Lane, Cades Cove Loop Road, US 129

Abrams Creek is a creek in Blount County, Tennessee. Its headwaters are in Cades Cove, and it is a tributary of the Little Tennessee River. It is named after the Chilhowee Cherokee chief Old Abraham ("Abram"). Visitors swim and fish in the creek. The creek was deliberately poisoned in 1957 to kill fish in potential competition with rainbow trout; many fish species were extirpated from the river and have never recovered.

== Variant names ==
According to the Geographic Names Information System, it has also been known historically as:

- Abrahams Creek
- Abram Creek
- Abram's Creek
- Anthony Creek
- Cove Creek
- Green Creek

== Course ==
Abrams Creek begins at the confluence of Anthony Creek and Left Prong Anthony Creek west of Cold Water Knob, in Blount County, Tennessee and then flows generally west to join the Little Tennessee River in Chilhowee Lake approximately five miles north of Calderwood.

== Watershed ==
Abrams Creek drains 87.14 square miles (225.7 km^{2}) of area, receives about 62.7 in/year of precipitation, has a wetness index of 254.58, and is about 94% forested.

== See also ==
- List of rivers of Tennessee
