= Cheoah Dam =

Historic district in North Carolina, United States

- Cheoah Hydroelectric Development
- U.S. National Register of Historic Places
- U.S. Historic district
- Cheoah Hydroelectric Dam, 2024

- Location within North Carolina Location within the United States
- Location: 1512 Tapoca Rd., US 129, near Robbinsville, North Carolina
- Coordinates: 35°27′0″N 83°56′10″W
- Area: 25 acres (10 ha)
- Built: 1919; 107 years ago
- Built by: Power & Engineering Group of Alcoa
- Architectural style: Classical Revival
- MPS: Tapoco Hydroelectric Project MPS
- NRHP reference No.: 04000464
- Added to NRHP: May 21, 2004

The Cheoah Dam is a hydroelectric dam located in Graham and Swain counties, North Carolina, on the Little Tennessee River between river miles 51 and 52. The Cheoah Development consists of a dam and powerhouse, the first of several constructed by the Tallassee Power Company (now Tapoco), a subsidiary of Aluminum Company of America (now Alcoa), in order to generate electricity to smelt aluminum in Alcoa, Tennessee. The name Cheoah comes from the Cherokee Native American word for "otter."

The Cheoah project began in 1916 as a construction camp at the Narrows, where the Little Tennessee River flowed through a narrow gorge, and it was completed in 1919. Cheoah Dam created the long, narrow Cheoah Reservoir, which covers approximately 644 acres (261 ha) of the normal full pool area and a drainage area of 1,608 square miles (4,160 km^{2}). The elevation of Cheoah Reservoir is 1,276.8 feet (389.2 m) (USGS). A scenic highway runs the length of the reservoir.

The water inflow for Cheoah, like that of Calderwood and Chilhowee, is primarily dependent on releases from TVA's Fontana Dam, the primary flow control facility for the lower Little Tennessee River. Tapoco operated the Cheoah Development until 2012, when it was sold to Brookfield Renewable Energy Partners, forming Brookfield Smoky Mountain Hydropower.

When completed in 1919, the 225-foot (69 m) dam was the world's highest overflow dam. The turbines were the largest in the world, and the 150,000-volt transmission line had the highest voltage and the longest span for a transmission line—5,010 feet (1,530 m) across the river below Cheoah Dam. The dam and associated structures were listed on the National Register of Historic Places in 2004.

The dam was used as a filming location for the 1993 movie The Fugitive, starring Harrison Ford and Tommy Lee Jones.

== Gallery ==
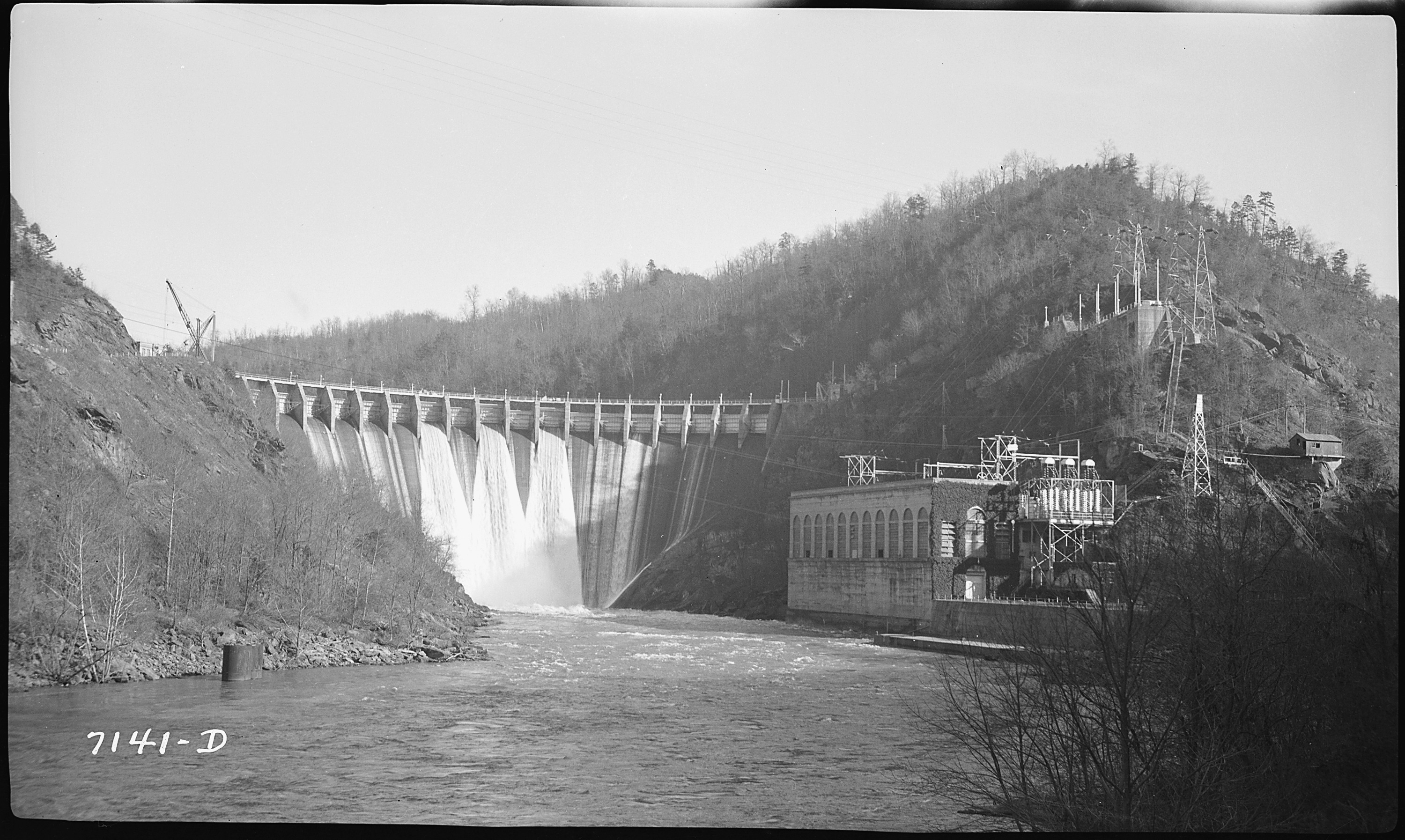
1939

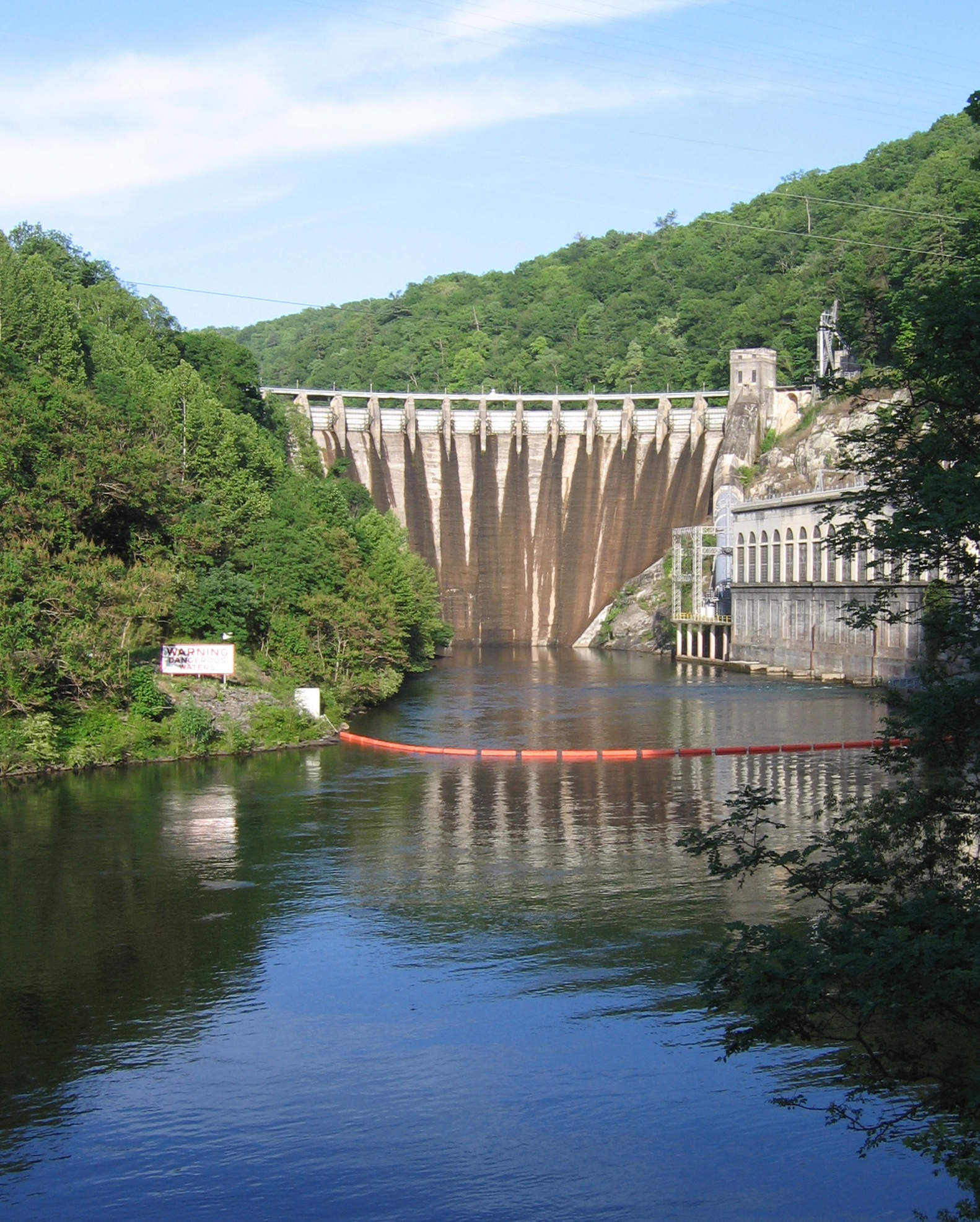
2008

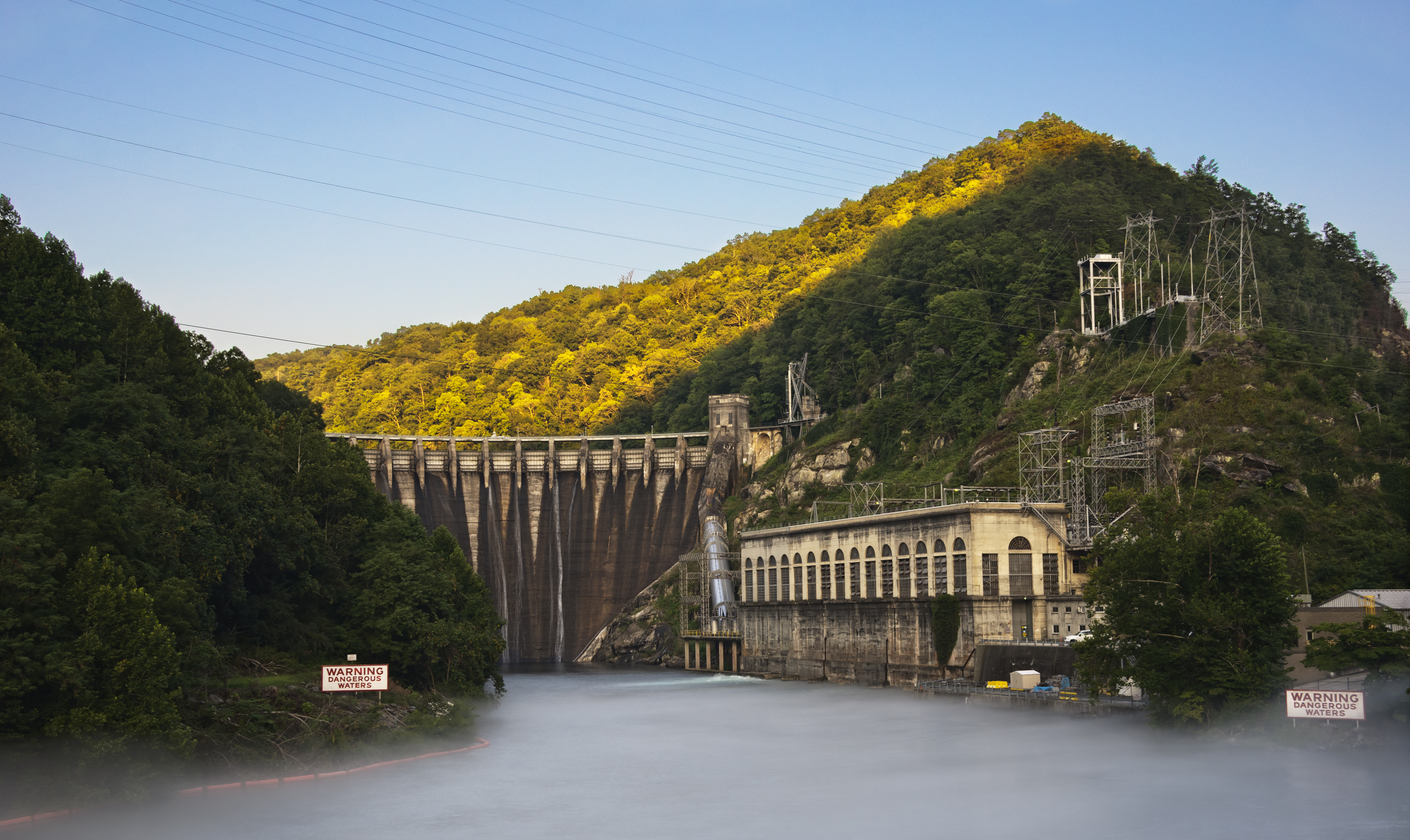
2010

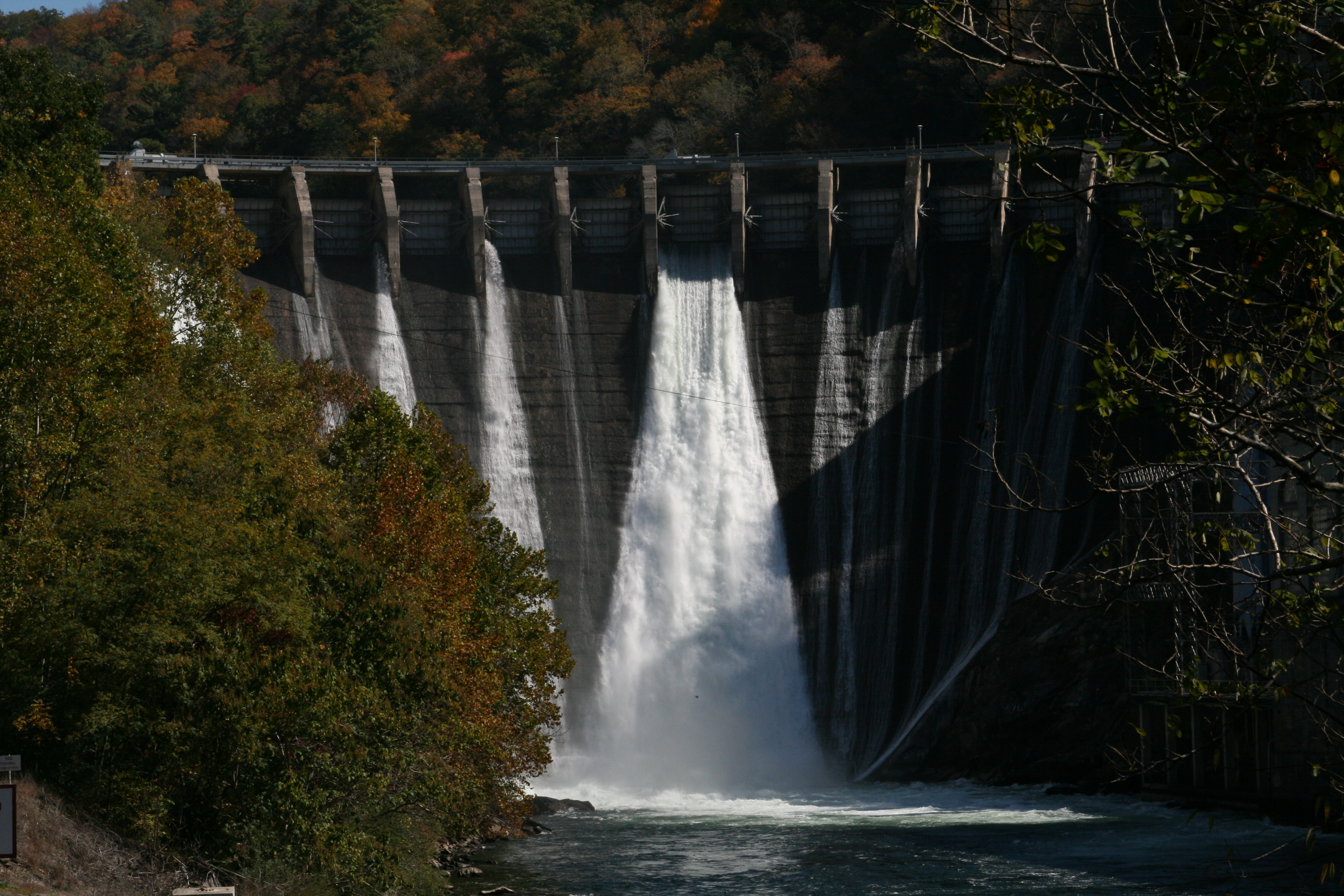
2011

== See also ==
- National Register of Historic Places listings in Graham County, North Carolina
