= Little Tennessee River =

River in the United States of America

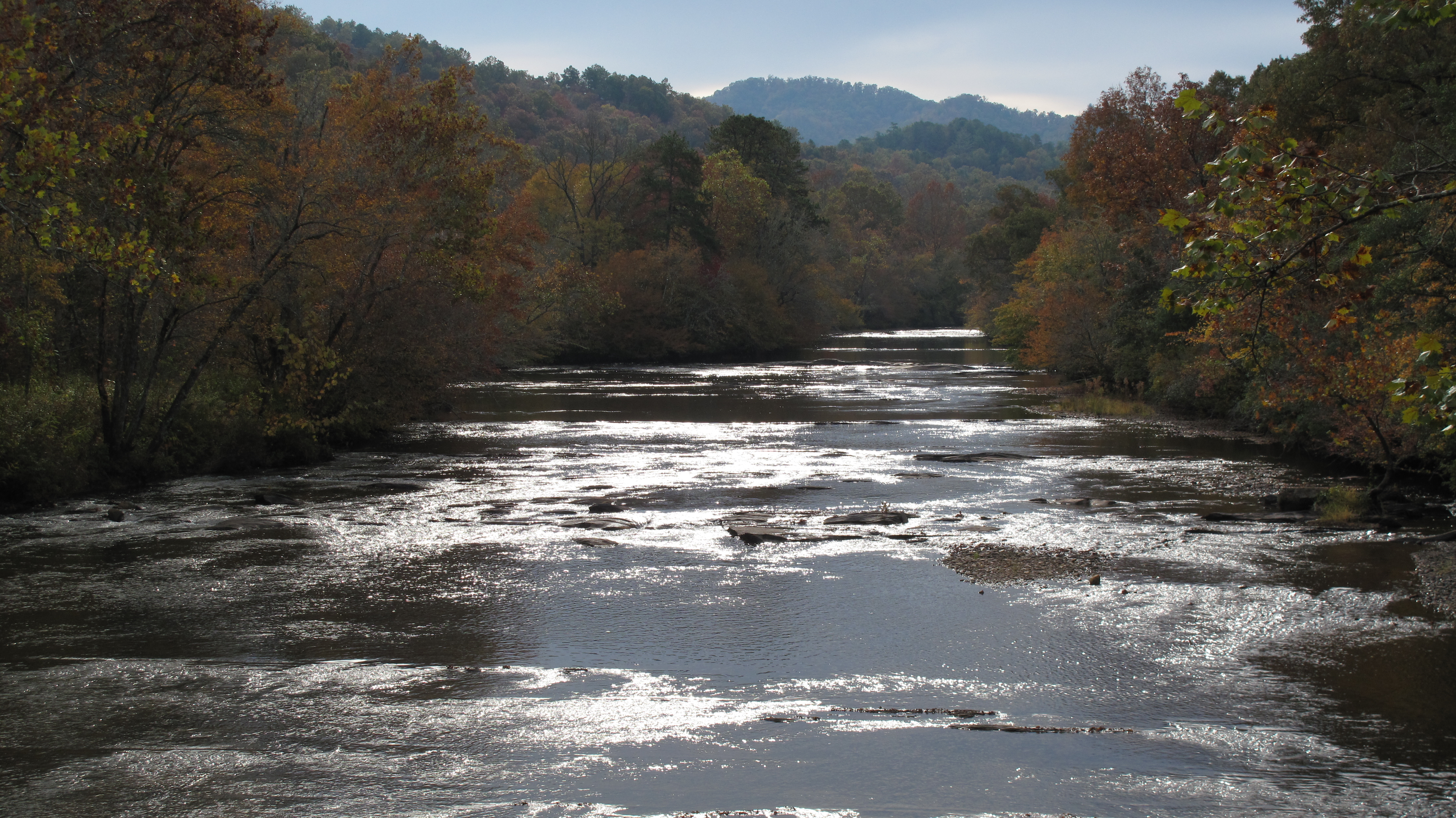
- Little Tennessee River in North Carolina

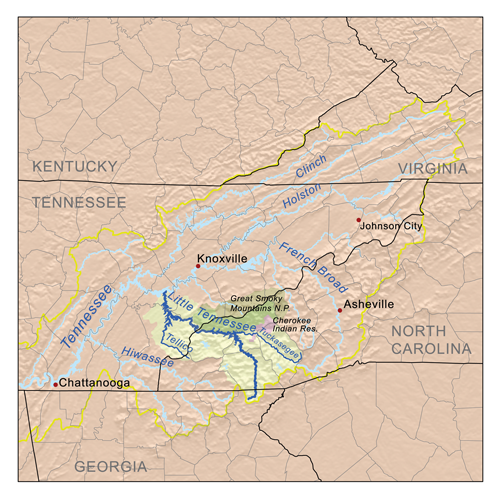
- Little Tennessee River watershed

Location
- Country: United States
- State: Georgia, North Carolina, Tennessee

Physical characteristics
- Source: Keener Creek
  - location: Rabun County, Georgia
  - coordinates: 34°57′36″N 83°27′53″W
  - elevation: 3,240 ft (990 m)
- 2nd source: Billy Creek
  - location: Rabun County, Georgia
  - coordinates: 34°55′17″N 83°27′04″W
  - elevation: 2,640 ft (800 m)
- Source confluence
  - location: Rabun County, Georgia
  - coordinates: 34°55′49″N 83°26′11″W
  - elevation: 2,169 ft (661 m)
- Mouth: Tennessee River
  - location: Lenoir City, Tennessee
  - coordinates: 35°46′57″N 84°15′28″W
  - elevation: 741 ft (226 m)
- Length: 135 mi (217 km)
- Basin size: 2,627 sq mi (6,800 km^{2})
- Discharge
  - location: Tallassee, Tennessee (below Chilhowee Dam), 33 miles (53 km) above the mouth(mean for water years 1958–1979)
  - average: 5,012 cu ft/s (141.9 m^{3}/s)(mean for water years 1958–1979)
  - minimum: 20 cu ft/s (0.57 m^{3}/s)October 1974
  - maximum: 41,500 cu ft/s (1,180 m^{3}/s)May 1973

Basin features
- River system: Tennessee → Ohio → Mississippi
- Tributaries
  - left: Nantahala River, Cheoah River, Citico Creek, Tellico River
  - right: Tuckasegee River, Hazel Creek, Abrams Creek

The Little Tennessee River (known locally as the Little T) is a 135-mile (217 km) tributary of the Tennessee River that flows through the Blue Ridge Mountains in the southeastern United States from Georgia, into North Carolina, and then into Tennessee. Reaching its confluence with the Tennessee River at Lenoir City, Tennessee, it drains portions of three national forests— Chattahoochee, Nantahala, and Cherokee— and provides the southwestern boundary of the Great Smoky Mountains National Park.

Numerous dams were erected on the river in the 20th century for flood control and hydropower generation. The river flows through five major impoundments: Fontana Dam, Cheoah Dam, Calderwood Dam, Chilhowee Dam, and Tellico Dam, and one smaller impoundment, Porters Bend Dam.

== Course ==
The Little Tennessee River rises in the Blue Ridge Mountains, in the Chattahoochee National Forest in northeast Georgia's Rabun County. After flowing north through the mountains past Dillard into southwestern North Carolina, it is joined by the Cullasaja River at Franklin. The river turns northwest, flowing through the Nantahala National Forest at the southern border of the Great Smoky Mountain National Park along the north side of the Nantahala Mountains. It crosses into eastern Tennessee and joins the Tennessee River at Lenoir City, 25 miles (40 km) southwest of Knoxville.

== Impoundments ==
The lower river is impounded in several places by sequential dams, some created as part of the Tennessee Valley Authority (TVA) system. They form a string of reservoirs in western North Carolina and East Tennessee down to the river's confluence with the Tennessee. Near the state line between North Carolina and Tennessee, the Little Tennessee River is impounded by the 480-foot (150 m) tall Fontana Dam, completed in 1944, forming Fontana Lake along the southern boundary of Great Smoky Mountains National Park. It is also impounded by Cheoah Dam in North Carolina, and by Calderwood and Chilhowee dams in Tennessee. The reservoirs provide flood control and hydroelectric power.

Calderwood and Cheoah dams divert water through short tunnels slightly downstream of the dams to hydroelectric generators. Chilhowee has power generators built directly into the dam itself. Some water is also diverted from the nearby Santeetlah Dam on the Cheoah River to power another hydroelectric generator at the Santeetlah Powerhouse. This water is brought to the Little Tennessee River through 7 miles (11 km) of tunnels through the Great Smoky Mountains. Chilhowee, Calderwood, and Cheoah Dams and the Santeetlah Powerhouse were originally built by Alcoa to power the aluminum plant at Alcoa, Tennessee. To ensure efficiency in operation, Alcoa coordinates the operation of its hydro system with TVA, making sure that reservoir and river water levels are safe for recreational use (primarily boating and fishing) and that proper flows of water continue down the river.

The final impoundment is Tellico Dam, which is just above its mouth into the Tennessee River at Lenoir City, Tennessee. It creates Tellico Reservoir. The dam does not have its own hydroelectric generators, but serves to increase the flow through those at nearby Fort Loudoun Dam on the Tennessee by means of a canal that diverts much of the flow of the Little Tennessee.

The proposed project to build the dam and reservoir was the subject of environmental controversy during the 1970s because of the discovery of the snail darter, an endangered species. It was the first major legal challenge to the Endangered Species Act.

== History ==
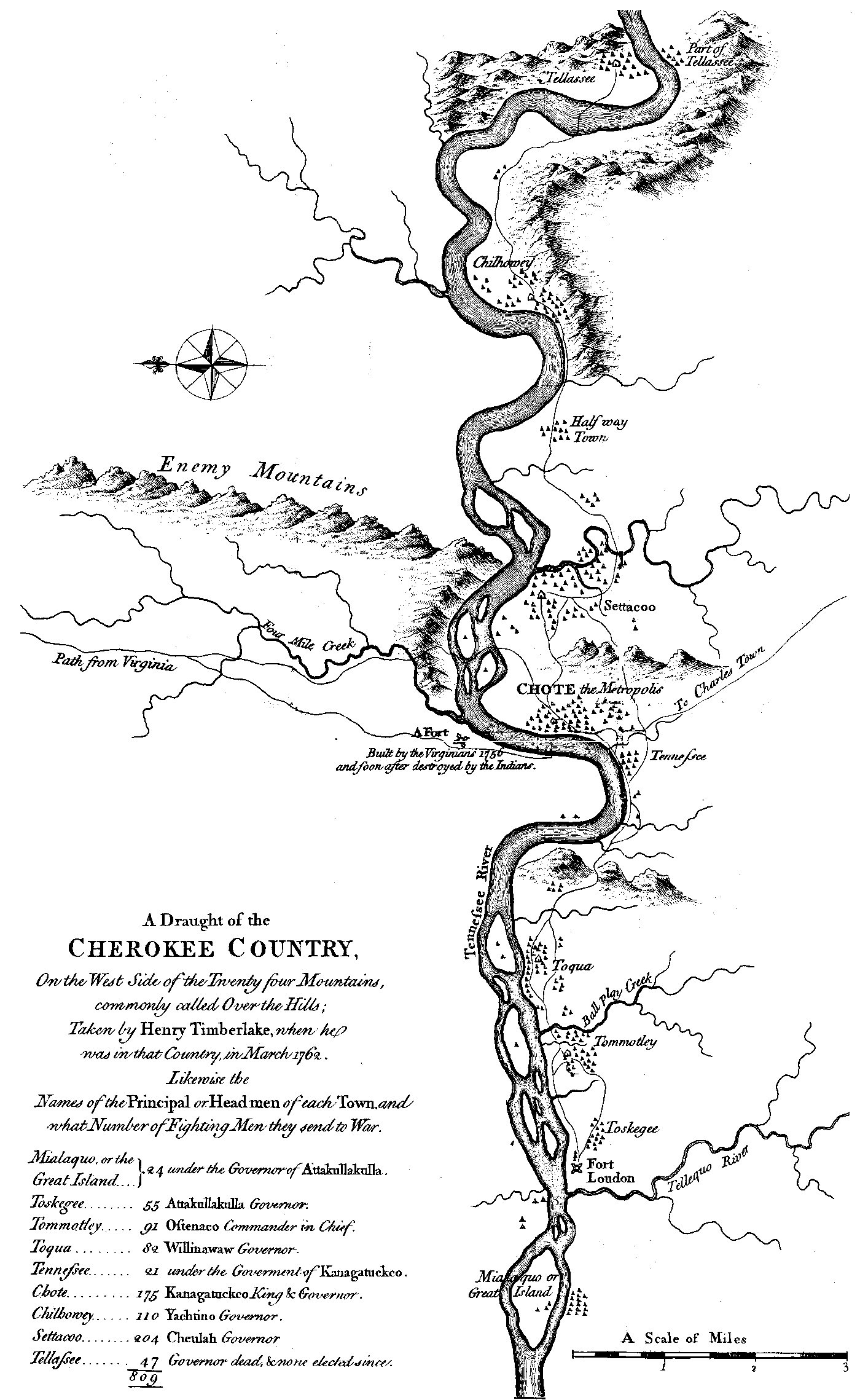
Henry Timberlake's 1765 Draught of the Cherokee Country, showing several Cherokee villages and towns located along the lower Little Tennessee River

The Little Tennessee River and its immediate watershed comprise one of the richest archaeological areas in the southeastern United States, containing substantial indigenous habitation sites dating to as early as 7,500 B.C. Cyrus Thomas, who conducted a survey in the 1880s of earthwork mounds in the area for the Smithsonian Institution, wrote that the Little Tennessee River was "undoubtedly the most interesting archaeological section in the entire Appalachian district."

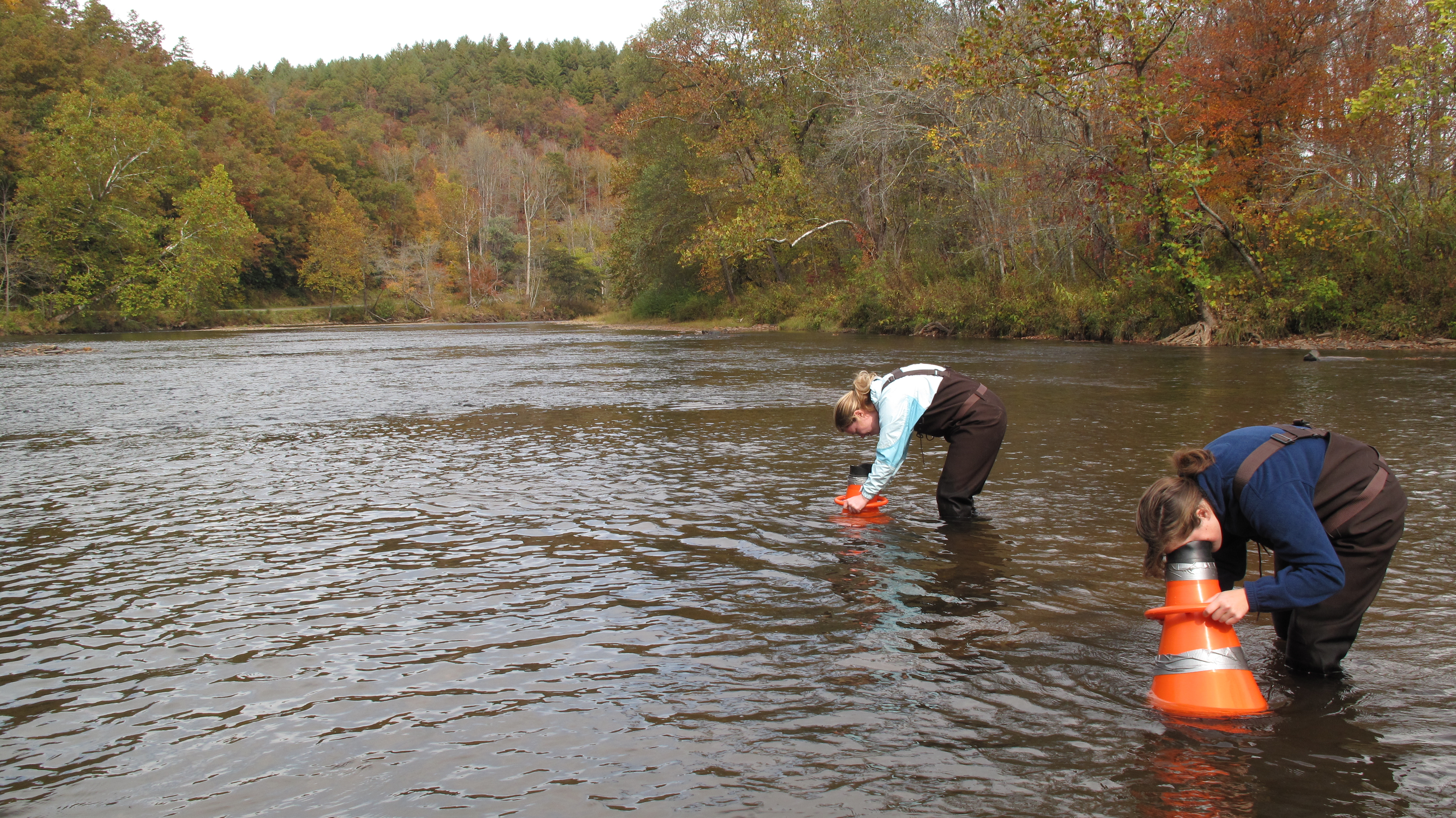
Montreat College students explore the Little Tennessee River

Substantial Archaic period (8000–1000 B.C.) sites along the river include the Icehouse Bottom and the Rose Island sites, both located near the confluence of the Tellico River with the Little Tennessee in present-day Tennessee. These sites were probably semi-permanent base camps, the inhabitants of which may have sought the chert deposits on the bluffs above the river which they used to create tools.

Evidence of Woodland period (1000 B.C. – 1000 A.D.) habitation has been uncovered at numerous sites along the Little Tennessee on this side of the mountains, most notably at Icehouse Bottom, Rose Island, Calloway Island (near the river's confluence with Toqua Creek), Thirty Acre Island (near the river's confluence with Nine Mile Creek), and Bacon Bend (between Toqua and Citico Beach). Salvage archeological excavations in the 1970s before completion of the Tellico Dam uncovered large groups of Woodland-period burials on both Rose and Calloway islands in present-day Tennessee. Pottery fragments uncovered at Icehouse Bottom in the 1970s show evidence of interaction with the Hopewell people of what is now Ohio.

Mississippian period (c. 1000–1500 A.D.) sites in the Little Tennessee Valley include the Toqua site (at the river's confluence with Toqua Creek), Tomotley (adjacent to Toqua), Citico (at the river's Citico Creek confluence), and Bussell Island (at the mouth of the river). Toqua's Mississippian inhabitants constructed a 25-foot (7.6 m) high platform mound overlooking a central plaza. By 1400, the village covered 4.8 acres (0.019 km^{2}), surrounded by a clay-covered palisade.

Several Cherokee Middle Towns, including Nikwasi, Watauga, Jore, and Cowee, were located along the upper Little Tennessee River's section in present-day North Carolina section. Mounds built about 1000 CE by ancestral Mississippian culture people have survived at these sites.

As noted above, the river was the spine of most of the major Overhill Cherokee towns, the most prominent of which included Chota, Tanasi, Toqua, Tomotley, Mialoquo (near Rose Island), Chilhowee (at the river's Abrams Creek confluence), Tallassee (near modern Calderwood), Citico, and Tuskegee (adjacent to Fort Loudoun).

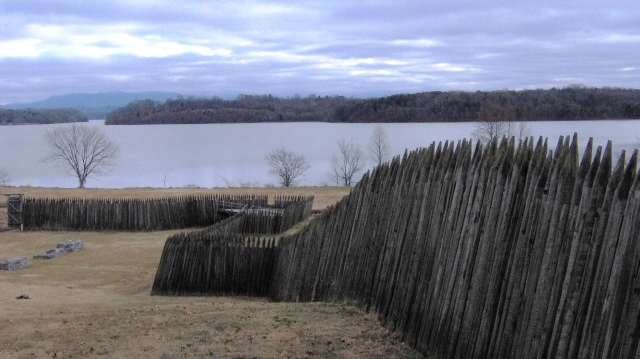
Fort Loudoun

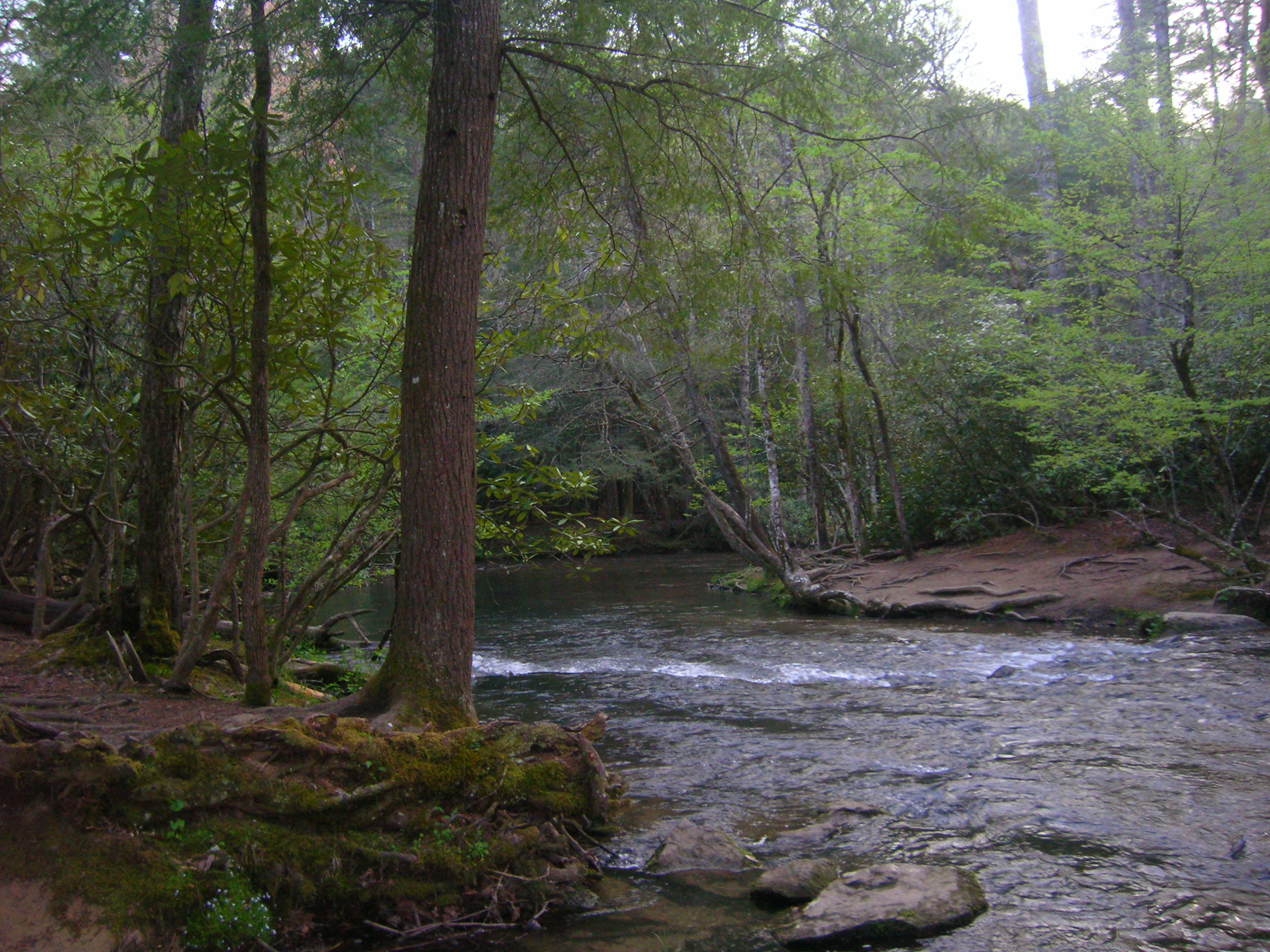
Abrams Creek

Euro-American traders were visiting the Overhill towns along the Little Tennessee by the late 17th century. There is some evidence that Spanish explorers Hernando De Soto and Juan Pardo passed through the Little Tennessee Valley in 1540 and 1567, respectively.

In 1756 the English built Fort Loudoun, located at the river's confluence with the Tellico River, for defenses during the French and Indian War. This was the name for the North American front of the Seven Years' War in Europe between the English and French. The fort has been reconstructed as an historic site. Two early American sites are located along the Little Tennessee— the Tellico Blockhouse, an outpost at the river's Nine Mile Creek confluence, and Morganton, a river port and ferry town near modern Greenback, which thrived in the early 19th century. The Hazel Creek section of the Great Smoky Mountains National Park, located on the north shore of the river's Fontana Lake impoundment, was home to a substantial European-American Appalachian community in the late 19th and early 20th centuries.

== See also ==
- List of rivers of Tennessee
