= Wear Cove =

Valley in southwestern Sevier County, Tennessee

Coordinates: 35.71393°N 83.65315°W

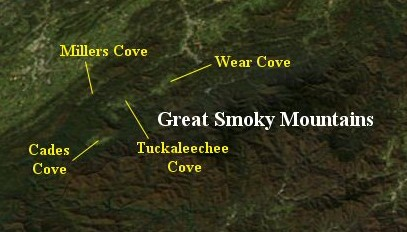
Coves of the northeast Great Smoky Mountains

Wear Cove is a valley in southwestern Sevier County, Tennessee. It runs parallel to the Great Smoky Mountains National Park just to its south. Like other park border regions, the history and economy of the valley are intertwined with that of the Smokies. The primary community is Wears Valley.

Wear Cove is a type of valley known as a "limestone window", created when erosion weathers through the older Precambrian sandstone and exposes the younger Paleozoic limestone beneath. The northern rim of the Smokies is dotted with limestone coves, the most well-known of which are Cades Cove and Tuckaleechee Cove. Limestone coves contain very fertile soil which lured early settlers.

Wear Cove is hemmed in by Cove Mountain to the southeast, Roundtop to the southwest, Davis Mountain to the northwest, and Hatcher Mountain to the northeast. Numerous hollows cut into the ridges throughout the cove, including Happy Hollow, Smith Hollow, and Little Cove.

U.S. Route 321 is the valley's main road, connecting Townsend in the west with Pigeon Forge in east, where it merges with U.S. Route 441. This section of 321 is known as "Wears Valley Road". Lyon Springs Road connects Wears Valley Road with Little River Road inside the national park, crossing the gap between Cove Mountain and Roundtop and emerging at the Metcalf Bottoms campground.

== History ==
=== Early settlement ===
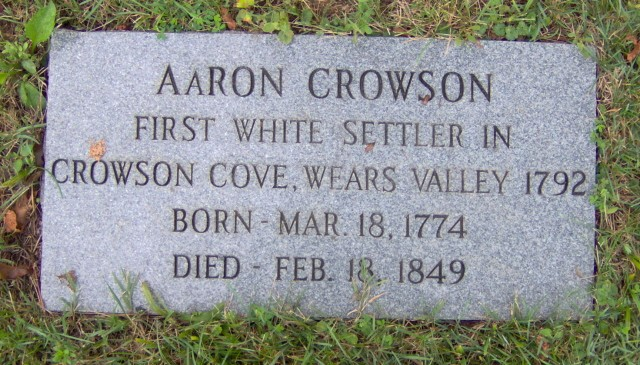
Aaron Crowson's grave at Crowson Cemetery in Wears Valley

The valley was originally named “Crowson Cove” after Aaron Crowson who first settled in the area in 1792. By 1900, however, it was renamed “Wear Cove” after Samuel Wear (1753–1817), a Revolutionary War veteran who erected a fort near the entrance to the valley in what is now Pigeon Forge.

Crowson arrived in Wear Cove from North Carolina in 1792 along with his friend, Peter Percefield. This was a period of elevated strife between the Cherokee and the fast-encroaching Euro-American settlers. Wear's Fort was attacked in 1793, with Wear leading a punitive march against the Cherokee village of Tallassee shortly thereafter. In May 1794, Percefield was killed in a Cherokee attack. Crowson rode to Wear's Fort to get help, but the Cherokee had fled by the time he returned. Several settlers marched onward to Great Tellico to the west, where they murdered four Cherokee while they slept. Percefield was buried on a hill in the eastern half of Wear Cove in what is now Crowson Cemetery. Later that year, Crowson received a land grant for this plot of land.

Along with Crowson, other early settlers in the cove included a Revolutionary War veteran named William Headrick, who arrived in 1821, and John Ogle, a War of 1812 veteran and son of the first settlers in Gatlinburg. Another War of 1812 veteran, Peter Brickey (1769–1856), arrived in 1808. Brickey operated a large farm and distillery in the valley until his death in 1856. The log home he built shortly after his arrival still stands in Smith Hollow (between Wears Valley and Townsend) and is listed on the National Register of Historic Places.

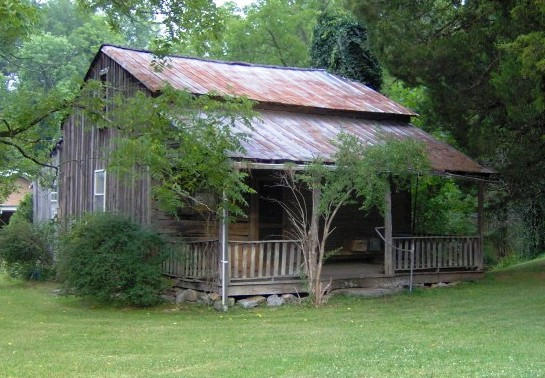
The Peter Brickey House, constructed ca. 1808

Like many other farms in the cove, the Brickey farm was ravaged by the U.S. Civil War. Isaac Trotter, who operated the iron forge at Pigeon Forge reported a Cherokee raid in Wear Cove in 1864. Earlier in the war, a Union army passed through the valley en route to dislodge the troops of Will Thomas who were entrenched in Gatlinburg.

Sometime after the war, Alfred Line established a farm at the base of Roundtop Mountain, near the southern half of Wear Cove. Line Spring, a clear mountain spring which flows down from the slopes of Roundtop, gave its name to a small recreational area that developed in this part of the cove. In the 1880s and 1890s, mineral-rich mountain springs were thought to have health-restoring qualities, and provided an early form of tourism for the mountain regions. In 1910, D.B. Lawson, the son of a circuit rider who had purchased the Line farm, constructed the Line Spring Hotel. The hotel boosted the valley's economy by providing a market for local farmers.

=== Religion ===
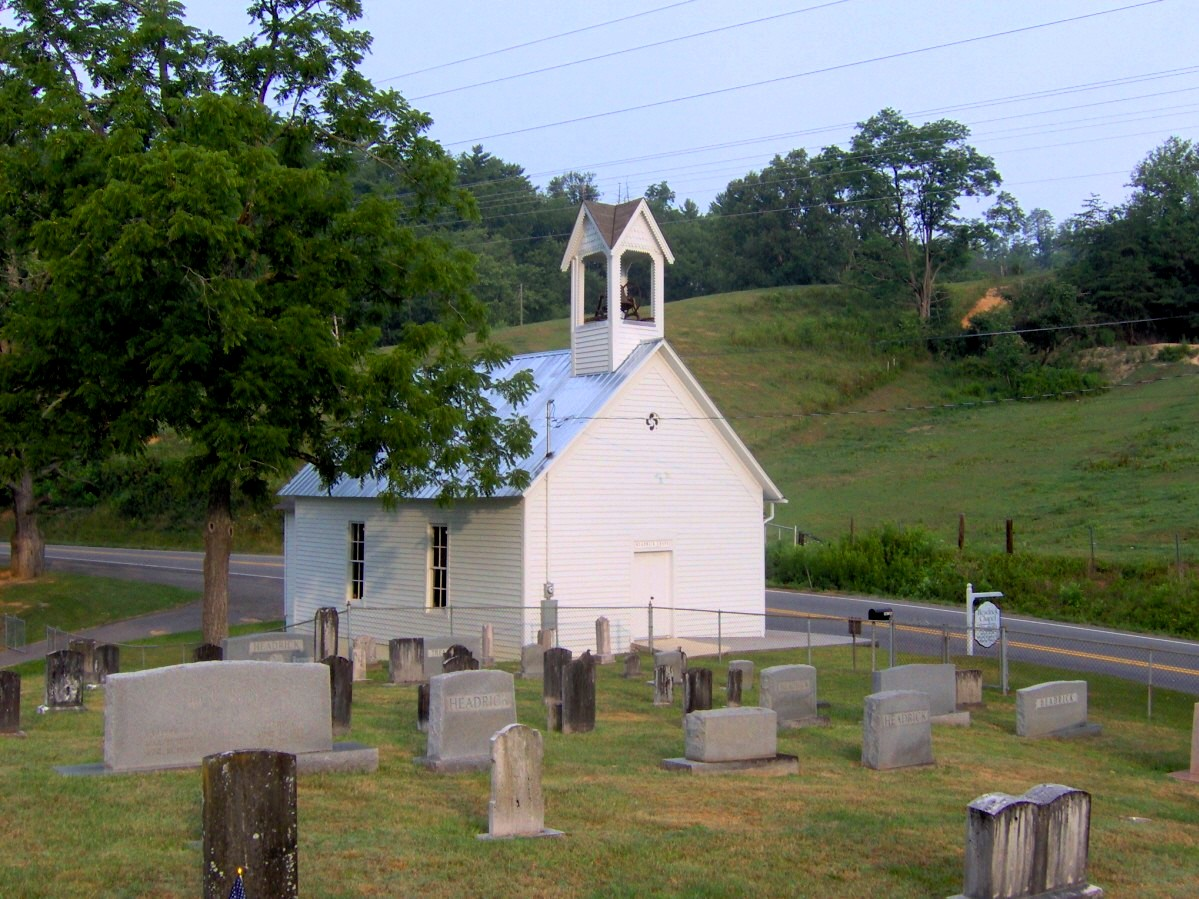
Headrick Chapel, constructed in 1902

Around 1800, Crowson and several other settlers erected a crude log church known as the Bethlehem Church. The church was used by both Methodists and Baptists throughout the 1800s, with Baptist services being conducted by an elected pastor and Methodist services being conducted by circuit riders. On occasion, both congregations would meet in a mini-revival known as a "union meeting". In 1886, both Baptists and Methodists constructed separate structures, although union meetings were still fairly common.

For most of the 19th century, funerals in the valley were held at Headrick Cemetery, near the valley's western entrance. A large oak tree provided shelter for funeral-goers, although cold weather and rain often made apparent the need for a building in which to conduct indoor services. In 1902, according to local lore, the oak tree was destroyed by lightning, and in response, the residents erected Headrick Chapel on the cemetery's grounds. The chapel was shared by four Baptist and Methodist congregations, with funeral services having priority. The chapel's bell would ring once for every year of the deceased's life, a tradition still observed by the inhabitants of Wears Valley. In 2001, Headrick Chapel was placed on the National Register of Historic Places.

=== The national park ===
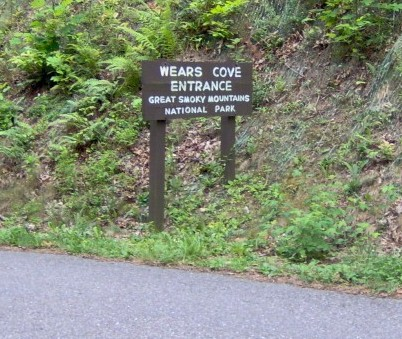
The Wear Cove entrance to the GSMNP on Lyon Spring Road

In 1934, the Great Smoky Mountains National Park was established. The park's border paralleled Wear Cove to the south, following the crest of Roundtop and Cove Mountain. With improvements to US-321 in the 1950s, tourist outlets began to trickle into the cove. Cabin rentals and outdoor supply stores are among the more common tourism-oriented venues in the valley today.

In 2005, a group of developers led by Ron Ogle and Jerry Miller sought to build 400 houses on the slopes of Cove Mountain. This raised concern among many valley residents over the impact such development might have on Cove Mountain's scenic value. In 2007, Friends of Wears Valley – a group opposed to the development – unsuccessfully petitioned the Sevier County Regional Planning Commission to block the housing expansion on Cove Mountain. The group has posted "Save Our Mountains" signs throughout the valley, although the developers insist their plans will not harm the mountain's natural qualities.
