= Cove (Appalachian Mountains) =

Small valley in the Appalachian Mountains between two ridge lines

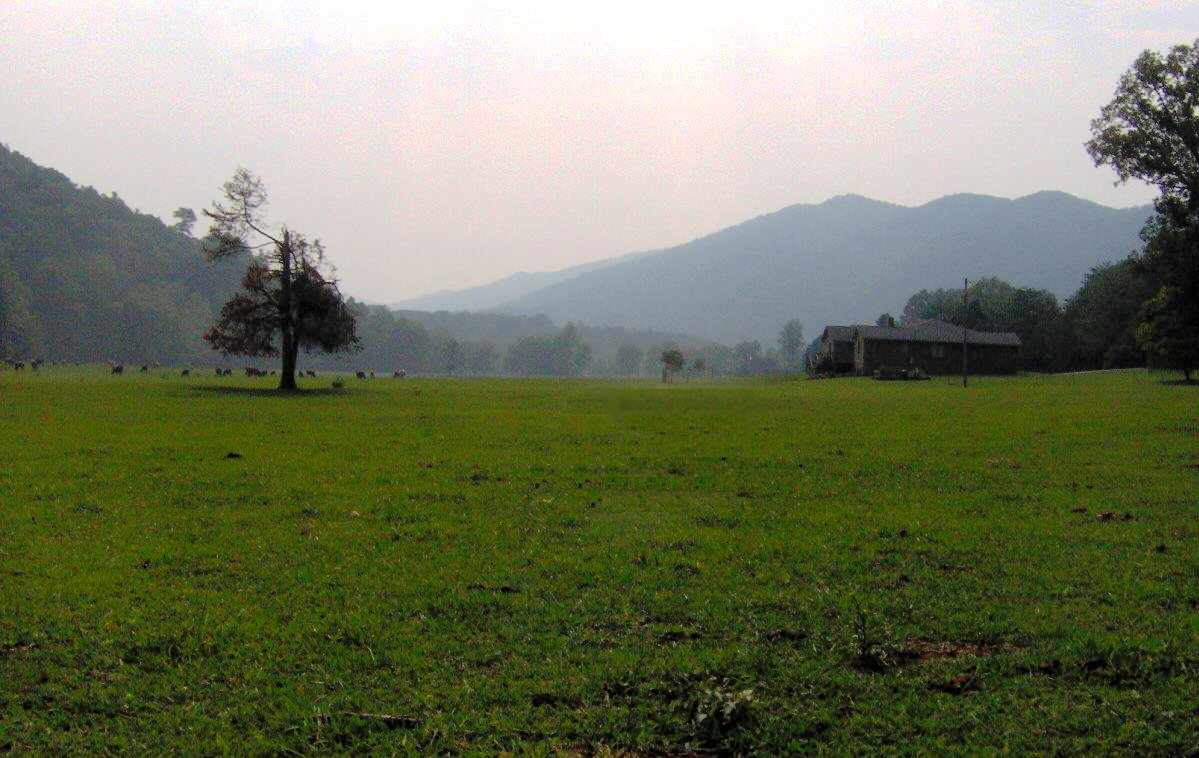
Miller's Cove in Tennessee is an example of a typical Appalachian cove, an enclosed valley in the mountains.

In the central and southern Appalachian Mountains of Eastern North America, a cove is a small valley between two ridge lines that is closed at one or both ends.

Among the places where the word "cove" appears in the name of an Appalachian valley are Morrison Cove in Pennsylvania; Lost Cove, North Carolina; Bumpass Cove, Tennessee; Doran Cove, Grassy Cove, Ladd Cove, in or adjacent to the Sequatchie Valley of Tennessee and Alabama; and numerous locations in the Great Smoky Mountains, including Cades Cove, Greenbrier Cove, Miller Cove, Tuckaleechee Cove, and Wears Cove. Burke's Garden in western Virginia is another example of a cove.

== Limestone coves ==
Geologically, some coves are windows formed by erosion that penetrated through the overlying thrust sheet, exposing the younger limestone beneath. Cades Cove and Wears Cove in Tennessee are examples of limestone coves, in which fertile soils have formed on the limestone parent material in the valley bottoms.

== Cove forest ==
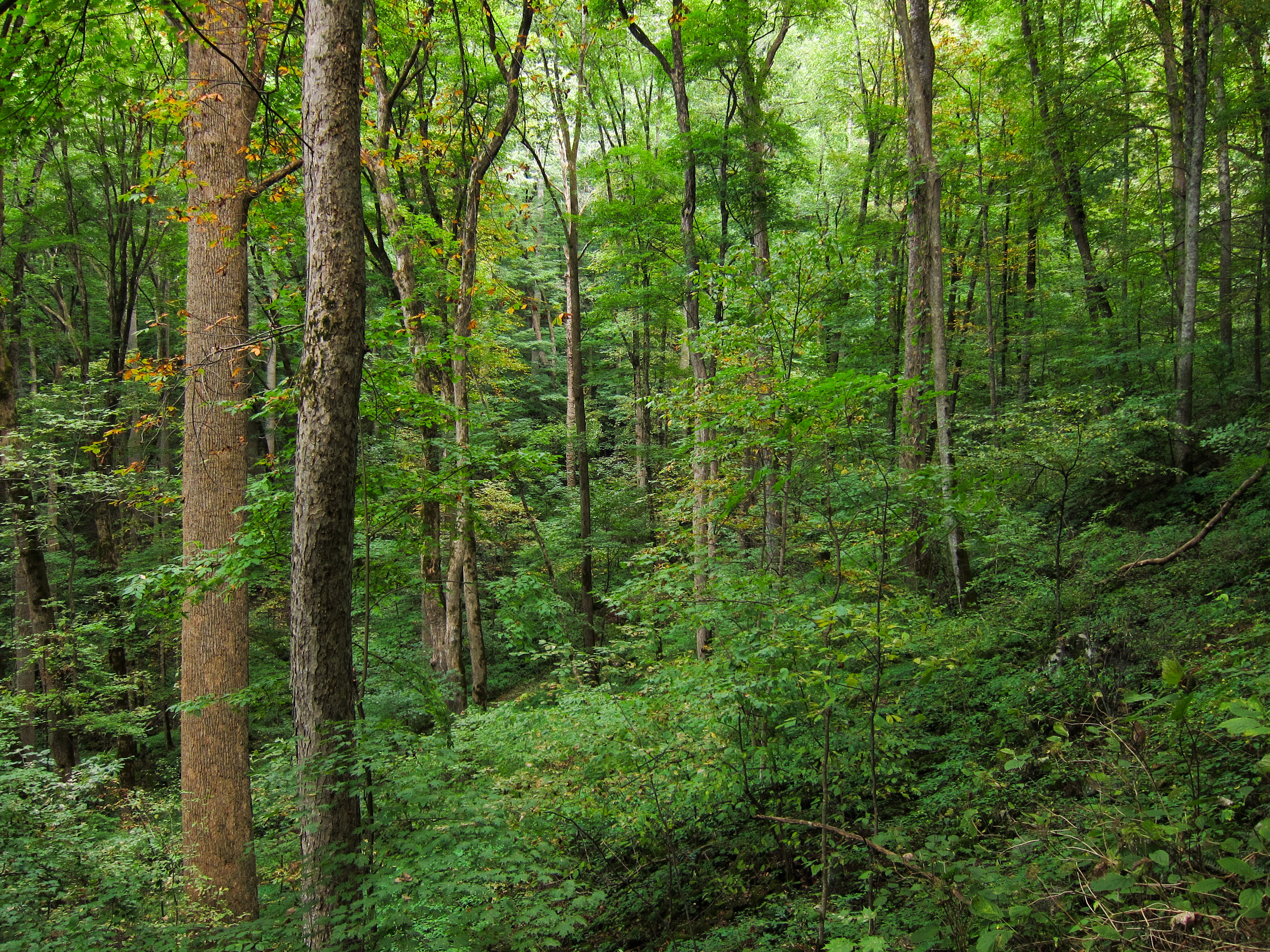
Cove forest near Baxter Creek in the Great Smoky Mountains.

Cove forest is the name for a type of deciduous forest community associated with Appalachian mountain coves. Cove forests, which are unique to the Appalachian Mountains and are a subtype of Appalachian-Blue Ridge forests, are found in protected positions in the landscape at middle to low elevations and are typified by high species richness of both plants and animals. Canopy species in this forest type include American basswood, tulip poplar, sugar maple, red maple, yellow birch, beech, white ash, bigleaf magnolia, bitternut hickory, and eastern hemlock. Carolina silverbell and eastern redbud are important understory trees. Notable flowering shrubs include rhododendron, flame azalea, and mountain laurel. Animals noted for their abundance and diversity in cove forest habitats include salamanders, birds, and small mammals.

The cove forest community is particularly well developed in the Great Smoky Mountains, where some 72,000 acres (290 km^{2}) of cove forest are still old-growth. The forest there is categorized into three subclasses. The rich montane subclass is found in protected coves with nutrient-rich soils, typically at elevations of 610 to 1,400 m (2,000 to 4,590 ft), in eastern Tennessee, western North Carolina, and southwestern Virginia. Dominant trees may include sugar maple, yellow buckeye, white ash, silverbell, or basswood, but yellow birch and beech are not dominant species. Bitternut hickory and northern red oak also may be common in the canopy. A defining feature of the rich montane association is the presence of lush herbaceous flora, including calciphilic plants whose presence indicates soils of neutral to alkaline pH (typically formed on limestone).

The typic montane subclass of cove forest is characterized by the absence or scarcity of calciphilic species and is found on non-limestone soils at elevations of 600 to 1,370 m (1,970 to 4,490 ft) in the southern Blue Ridge, including the Smoky Mountains, and 300 to 900 m (980 to 2,950 ft) in the northern Blue Ridge and adjacent Ridge and Valley. Dominant canopy trees include yellow buckeye, white ash, basswood, cucumber-tree magnolia, tulip poplar, red maple, Eastern hemlock, and black birch. Typical subcanopy trees and shrubs include flowering dogwood, striped maple, sweetshrub, and rosebay rhododendron. In the third subclass, the typic foothills type, tulip poplar is the dominant species, but the canopy also may include basswood, white ash, mockernut hickory, yellow buckeye, silverbell, American beech, white oak, and red maple. Ferns are often common in the herbaceous layer. This subclass, found on protected sites at elevations mostly below 610 m (2,000 ft), lacks species typical of higher elevation cove forests.

== See also ==
- Appalachian balds – Mountain type
- Appalachian bogs – Ecosystems in the Appalachian Mountains
- Southern Appalachian spruce–fir forest – Ecoregion of the southern Appalachian Mountains of the eastern United States
- Appalachian temperate rainforest
