= Talisi =

Talisi is an alternate spelling of Tallassee, which may refer to:

- Tallassee, Alabama, previously called Talisi, a city in Alabama, U.S.
- Tallassee (Cherokee town), an ancient Overhill Cherokee village site in Tennessee, U.S.
