= Roundtop Trail =

Hiking trail in Tennessee, United States

Coordinates: 35.6924°N 83.6461°W

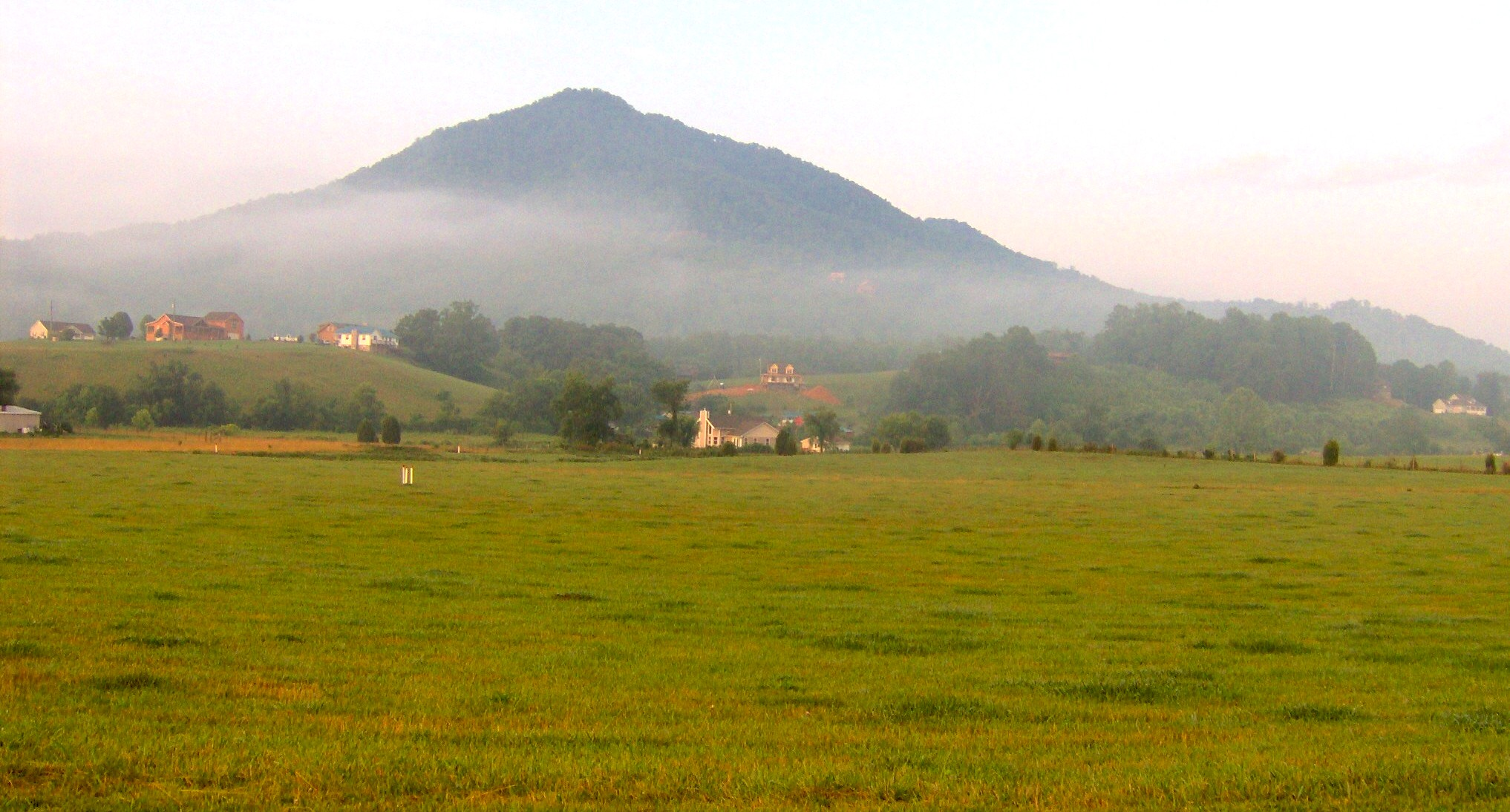
- Roundtop Mountain rising above Wears Valley
- Length: 7.5 mi (12.1 km)
- Location: Great Smoky Mountains National Park, Tennessee, United States
- Trailheads: Lyon Springs Road, just inside the park's Wear Cove boundary; the Townsend Y along Little River
- Use: Hiking
- Highest point: Just below the summit of Roundtop, 2,639 ft (804 m)
- Lowest point: Trail terminus at the Townsend Y, 1,118 ft (341 m)
- Difficulty: Moderate
- Season: Year-round
- Sights: Vistas of Wears Valley and the mountains south of the Little River Gorge
- Hazards: No bridge across Little River, if hiking one-way

The Roundtop Trail is an American hiking trail in Sevier County and Blount County sections of the Great Smoky Mountains National Park. The trail traverses the crest of Roundtop, a 3,077-foot (938 m) mountain that straddles the park's northern boundary. This trail, which passes through a thick forest of pine and oak and provides vistas of the valleys to the north and the mountains to the south, is one of the least-used trails in the park.

== Geographic and natural information ==
Roundtop is situated in the southwest corner of Sevier County and the southeast corner of Blount County, Tennessee. Along with Cove Mountain to the east and Rich Mountain to the west, Roundtop is one of a series of high ridges that form a "wall" that spans the park's northwestern boundary. The mountain overlooks Wears Valley to the northeast, Tuckaleechee Cove (Townsend) to the northwest, and the Little River Gorge to the south. Wear Cove Gap, which is traversed by Lyon Springs Road, divides Roundtop from Cove Mountain. The Townsend Y, formed by the confluence of Little River and the Middle Prong of Little River, is situated at the mountain's southwestern corner. Little Greenbrier is located near the Roundtop Trailhead.

Like most of the Great Smokies range, Roundtop is made up of Precambrian rocks of the Ocoee Supergroup. Large outcroppings of this rock form rock overhangs along the trail as it descends to the Townsend Y. Roundtop's forest consists largely of Table Mountain Pine and Pitch Pine trees, which gives way to a mixed mesophytic forest in the coves and hollows at the base of the mountain. Mountain laurel dominates the forest's understory.

While large parts of the mountain's northern slopes are private property, the entire summit of Roundtop is protected. The south side of the summit is within the national park's boundaries. The north side is part of a 237-acre (0.96 km^{2}) tract purchased by the state of Tennessee in 1974 and managed by the National Park Service.

== Vital information ==
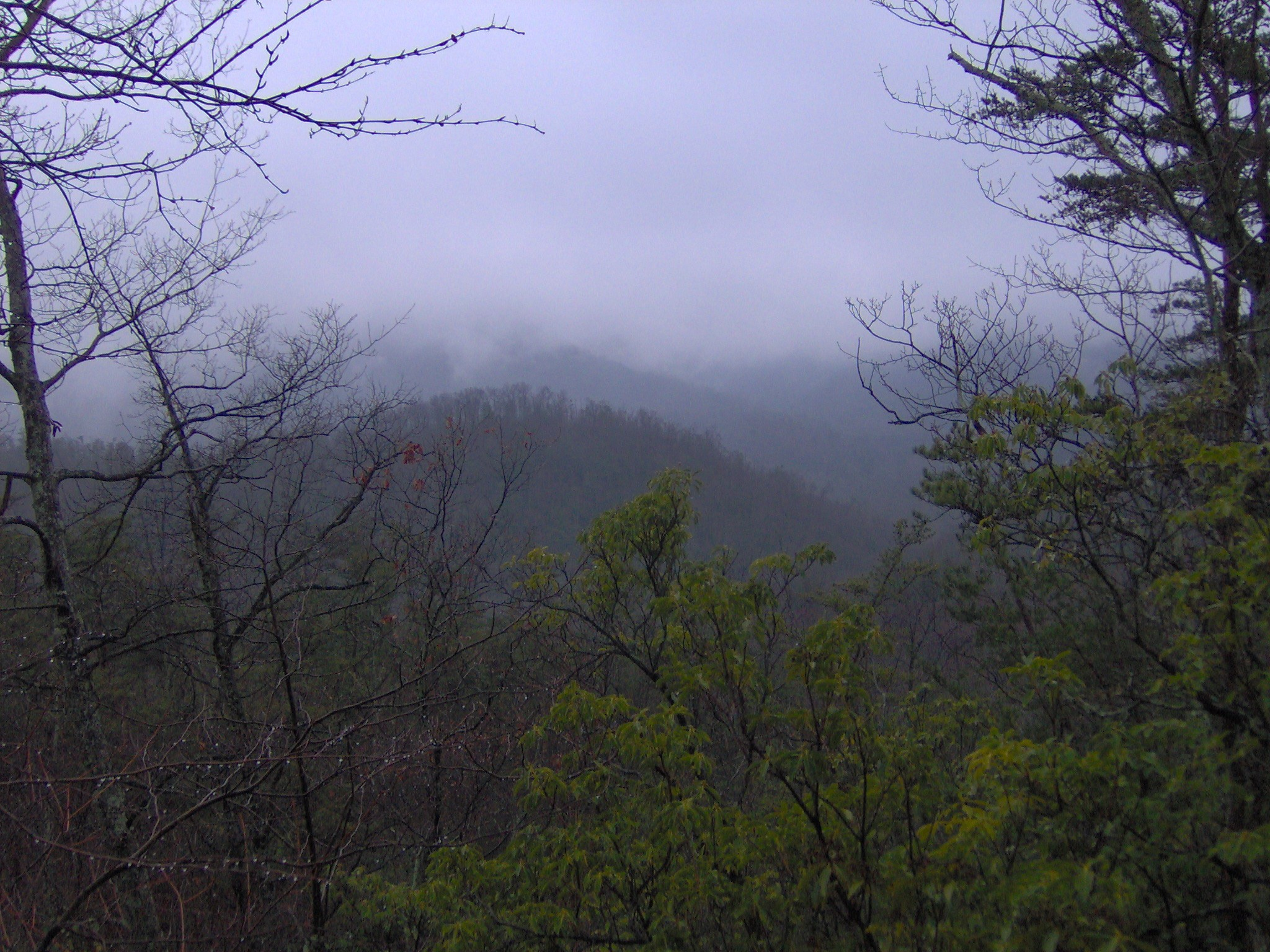
View of the mountains to the south

- The Roundtop Trail mostly follows the national park boundary. While the south side of the trail and the trail itself are federal property, parts of the northern side of the trail are private property.
- There is no parking at the Roundtop Trailhead, and very limited parking at the Little Greenbrier Trailhead, which is a block away on the other side of Lyon Springs Road. The nearest substantial parking lot is at Metcalf Bottoms, 1.2 miles (1.9 km) to the south. There is substantial parking at the Townsend Y, although the Y is a popular swimming area, and this parking lot fills up quickly in summer months.
- There is no bridge at the trail terminus along Little River, so the river will have to be forded to complete a one-way hike. The river typically ranges from ankle-high to hip-high, although it can be altogether impassable after heavy rains.
- There is a relatively steep switchback near the middle of the trail, although most of the trail involves gradual inclines and declines.

== Landmarks/overlooks ==
- The Townsend Y
- Sandstone outcroppings
- Blanket Mountain and the mountains immediately south of Little River Gorge
- Wears Valley

== Trail synopsis ==
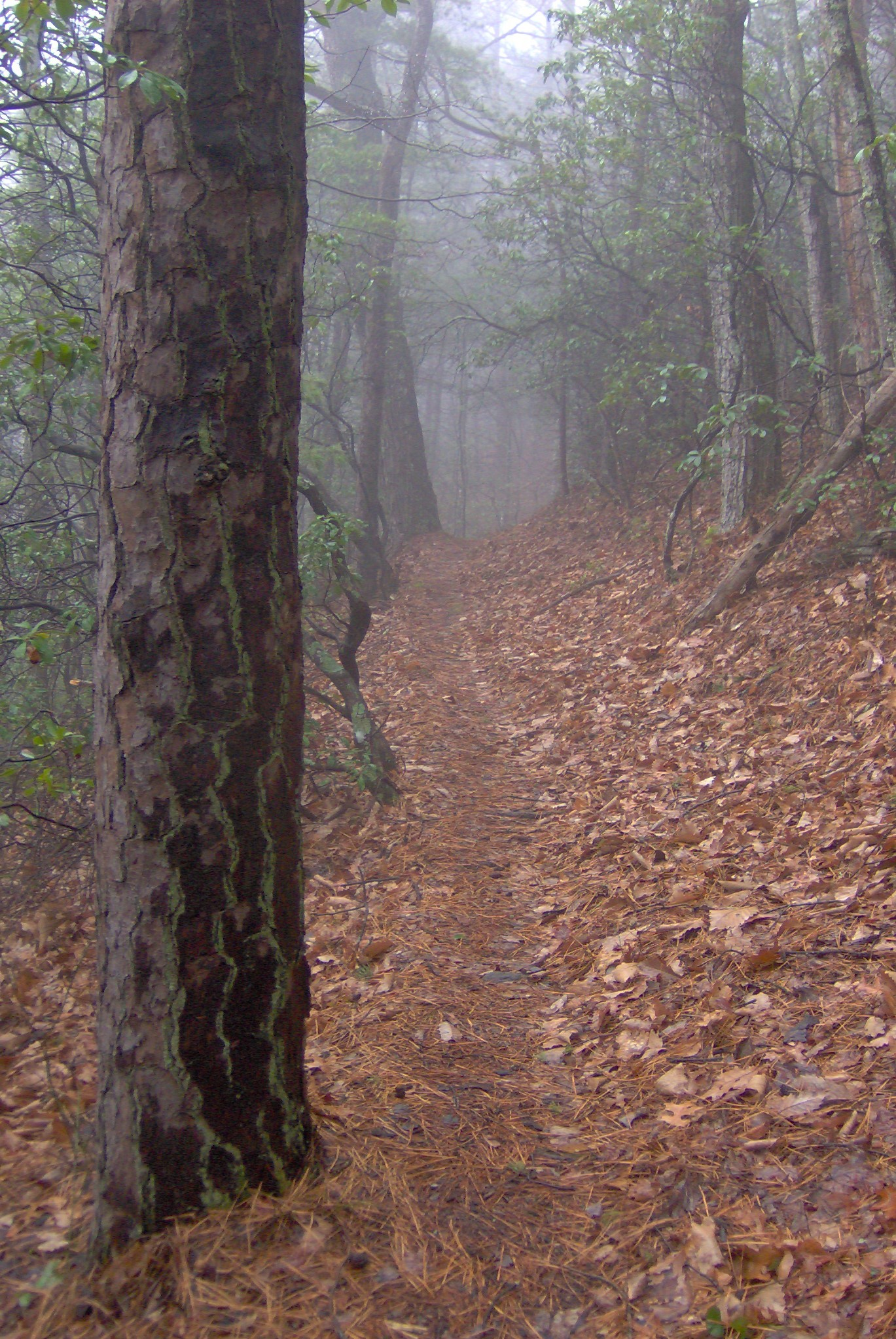
The Roundtop Trail near Little Roundtop

The Roundtop Trail begins just inside the Great Smoky Mountains National Park's Wears Cove entrance, on the right (west) side of Lyon Springs Road (Lyon Springs Road is accessible via U.S. Route 321 in Wears Valley and via Little River Road at Metcalf Bottoms). The trail immediately rises out of Wear Cove Gap and gradually ascends to the crest of Roundtop. The northern side of the first leg of the trail is private property, although most of it is still heavily forested. A house is visible atop a knob near the trailhead, and a rental lodge sits right on the trail approximately 1 mile (1.6 km) beyond the trailhead. The aesthetic disturbance from the privately owned side of the trail is minimal, however, and consists mainly of surveyor ribbons and the occasional sign.

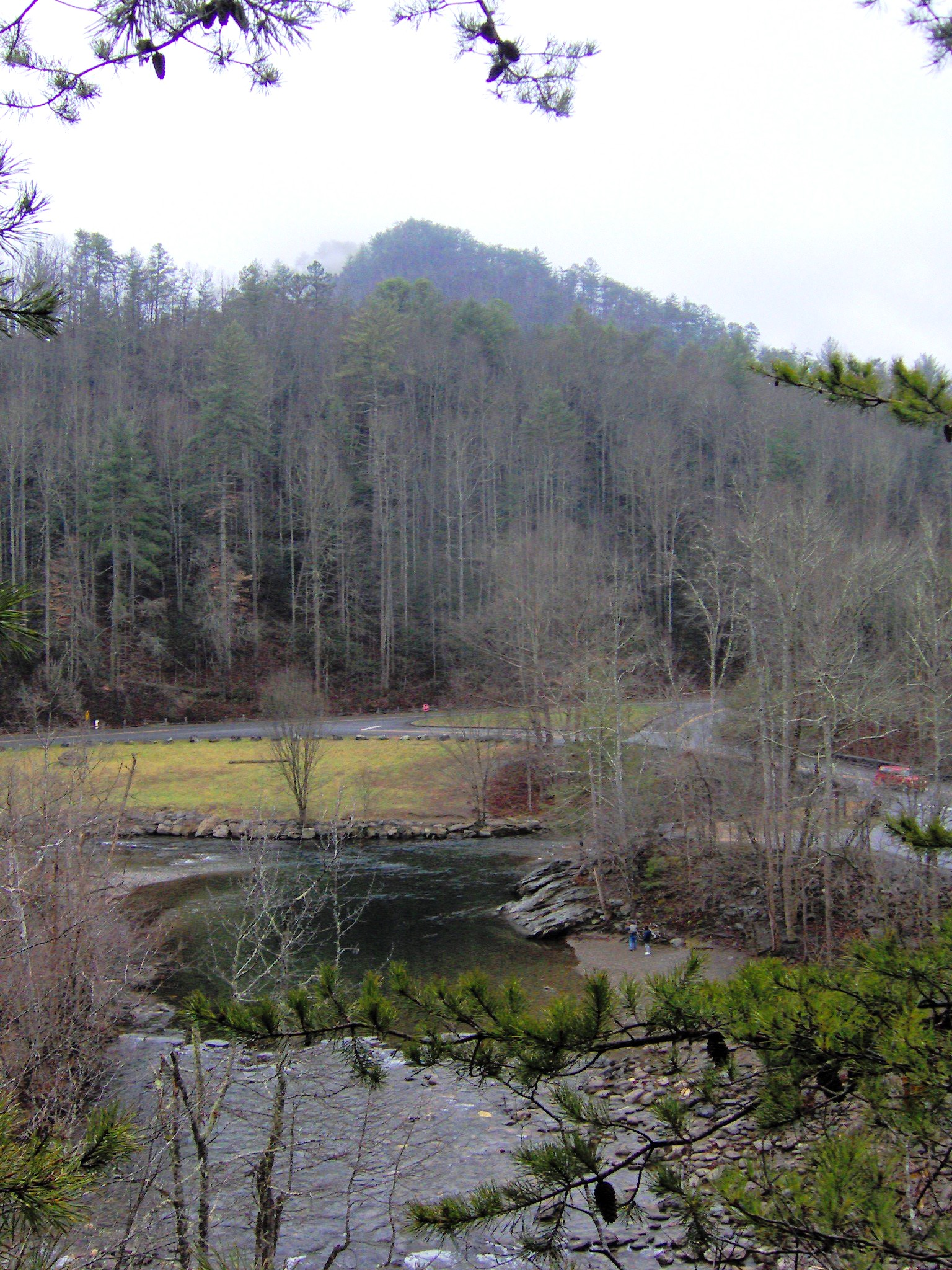
The Townsend Y, viewed from the Roundtop Trail

Just past the rental lodge, the trail begins to wind around the summit of Roundtop. The trail doesn't traverse the summit, however, and never eclipses 3,000 feet (910 m). Beyond the main summit, the trail passes along the south slope of the mountain's sub-peak, known as Little Roundtop. The Blount County, Sevier County, and National Park boundaries all join atop Little Roundtop. Just beyond the Big Creek headwaters, the trail declines sharply at a steep switchback as it descends to the lower, western half of the mountain.

Beyond Little Roundtop, the trail follows the crest of the ridge as it drops below 2,000 feet (610 m). This leg of the trail overlooks the southeastern extremes of Tuckaleechee Cove, and the sound of church bells from nearby Townsend are not uncommon on weekends. As the trail swings around the headwaters of Meadow Branch, it parallels the upper ridgeline of the Little River Gorge. Little River's rushing waters and winds sweeping up the narrow hollows typically create an unbroken roar emanating from the valley below. The trail follows the gorge's ridgeline for nearly a mile before being forced inward by a high knob on the mountain's western flank. The trail briefly crosses to the northern slope of the mountain, above a quiet hollow, before rounding the knob and beginning its descent to the Little River Valley.

The Roundtop Trail's descent is relatively sharp, but short. This leg of the trail is characterized by sandstone outcroppings, some of which form natural dry rock shelters. The Townsend Y and Little River Road can be discerned from the trail less than one-half mile from its terminus. The trail's terminus isn't marked, and splinters into several short paths, all leading the river's edge. The river is most easily forded immediately downstream or immediately upstream from the Y.
