= Samuel Wear =

Early American militia leader

- Born: 1753; Augusta County, Virginia Colony
- Died: April 3, 1817 (aged 63–64); Sevierville, Sevier County, Tennessee
- Relatives: Spouse: Mary Thompson | Living Descendants: Jackson Murphy
- Military career
- Allegiance: United States
- Branch: Militia
- Commands: "Wear's station," Tennessee District, Southwest Territory
- Conflicts: American Revolutionary War; Battle of Kings Mountain; Cherokee–American wars; War of 1812; Creek War

Samuel Wear (1753–April 3, 1817) was an American Revolutionary War soldier who fought at the Battle of Kings Mountain. He was one of the early inhabitants of, and a founder of, the "Lost State of Franklin". He later helped draft the Constitution of the State of Tennessee.

== Early life ==
Samuel Wear was born in Augusta County, Virginia in 1753. He and his first wife, Mary Thompson, had four children.

== Frontier life ==
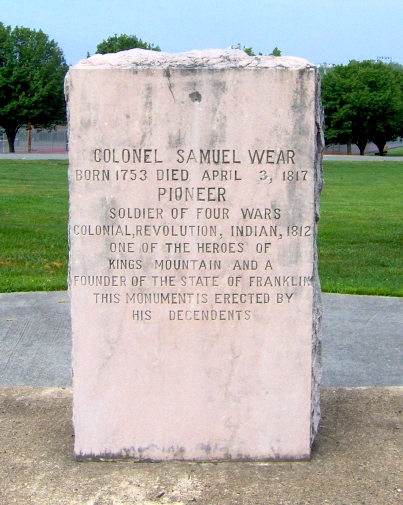
Monument honoring Samuel Wear in Pigeon Forge City Park

During the War for Independence, Wear and his family settled in the Overmountain town of Henderson Springs, then in Washington County (and later Greene County). Wear fought with the Overmountain Men in the Battle of Kings Mountain in October 1780. During the area's estrangement from North Carolina, Wear's house was the headquarters for the local Sevier County militia, loyal to Franklin president, John Sevier.

Wear served as a state constitutional delegate and was the first county clerk of Sevier County under the State of Franklin, 1786–1787. Wear kept the county clerk position through the several local, regional, territorial, and federal governmental changes that followed, and still held the position when the area received statehood in 1796. In February 1788, Wear, fighting alongside Sevier against John Tipton's forces, took part in the siege of Tipton's abode (the so-called "Battle of Franklin").

=== Indian relations ===
In 1782, Wear established a stockade, which was called "Wear's Fort" (or Wear's station) at the entrance to a cove situated at the confluence of Walden Creek and the Little Pigeon River (what is now Pigeon Forge City Park in present day Pigeon Forge). This is along the Cherokee footpath known as the "Indian Gap Trail," that passed through the valley en route to its junction with the Great Indian Warpath. Wear's fort was erected to protect the early settlers in that vicinity from Indian attacks; but its location along the trail made it a popular target for small bands of Cherokee raiders.

In 1786, Wear was one of the emissaries to the Cherokee who negotiated the Treaty of Coyatee, re-affirming the 1785 Treaty of Dumplin (that Dragging Canoe's Chickamauga faction had refused to recognize). The new treaty extended the area for white settlement almost as far south as the Little Tennessee River, along which the main "Overhill Cherokee" towns were located. After the conclusion of hostilities with Great Britain, however, continuing encroachment into lands the Cherokee believed to be theirs—by treaty with the Federal government—caused escalating violence in the area, especially south of the French Broad River.

Wear's Fort was attacked by Chickamauga in 1793. At the time, he was commander of the Sevier County militia, then operating under the Territory South of the River Ohio's territorial-governor, William Blount. Wear led a punitive march against the village of Tallassee shortly thereafter. The expedition killed at least fifteen Cherokee, and captured four females. In 1794, several Cherokee fired on Wear and his two sons just outside Calvins blockhouse (near Maryville). The Wears, however, escaped unharmed.

=== Constitutional delegate ===
In 1795, as a constitutional convention delegate appointed by Sevier, Wear and four others met at Wears Fort and drafted the constitution presented to convention delegates in the establishment of the State of Tennessee. Thomas Jefferson stated that of all the constitutions written and adopted by new frontier states, the Tennessee Constitution was the "best written and most in line with the spirit of the United States Constitution."

== War of 1812 ==
Wear commanded the 1st Regiment, East Tennessee Volunteer Militia, from September through December 1813, under General James White. The volunteer corp, which was stationed at the new Fort Strother in the Mississippi Territory, fought in the frontier extension of the War of 1812 (known as the "Creek War"), but was disbanded and sent home after the Hillabee Massacre.

== Later life and death ==
Wear died April 3, 1817, in Sevierville, Tennessee. He is buried in the Ft. Wear cemetery, Henderson Springs, Tennessee. A monument dedicated to Wear reads: "Pioneer, Soldier of four Wars; Colonial, Revolution, Indian,1812; One of the Heroes of Kings Mountain, and a Founder of the State of Franklin. This monument is erected by his decendents." [sic]

== Legacy ==
Wears Valley is named for Wear. Although the original name of the valley was "Crowson Cove," after its first settler, Aaron Crowson, the valley was using its current name by 1900. The reason for the 19th-century name change is uncertain.
