= Calderwood, Tennessee =

- Calderwood Hydroelectric Development
- U.S. National Register of Historic Places
- U.S. Historic district
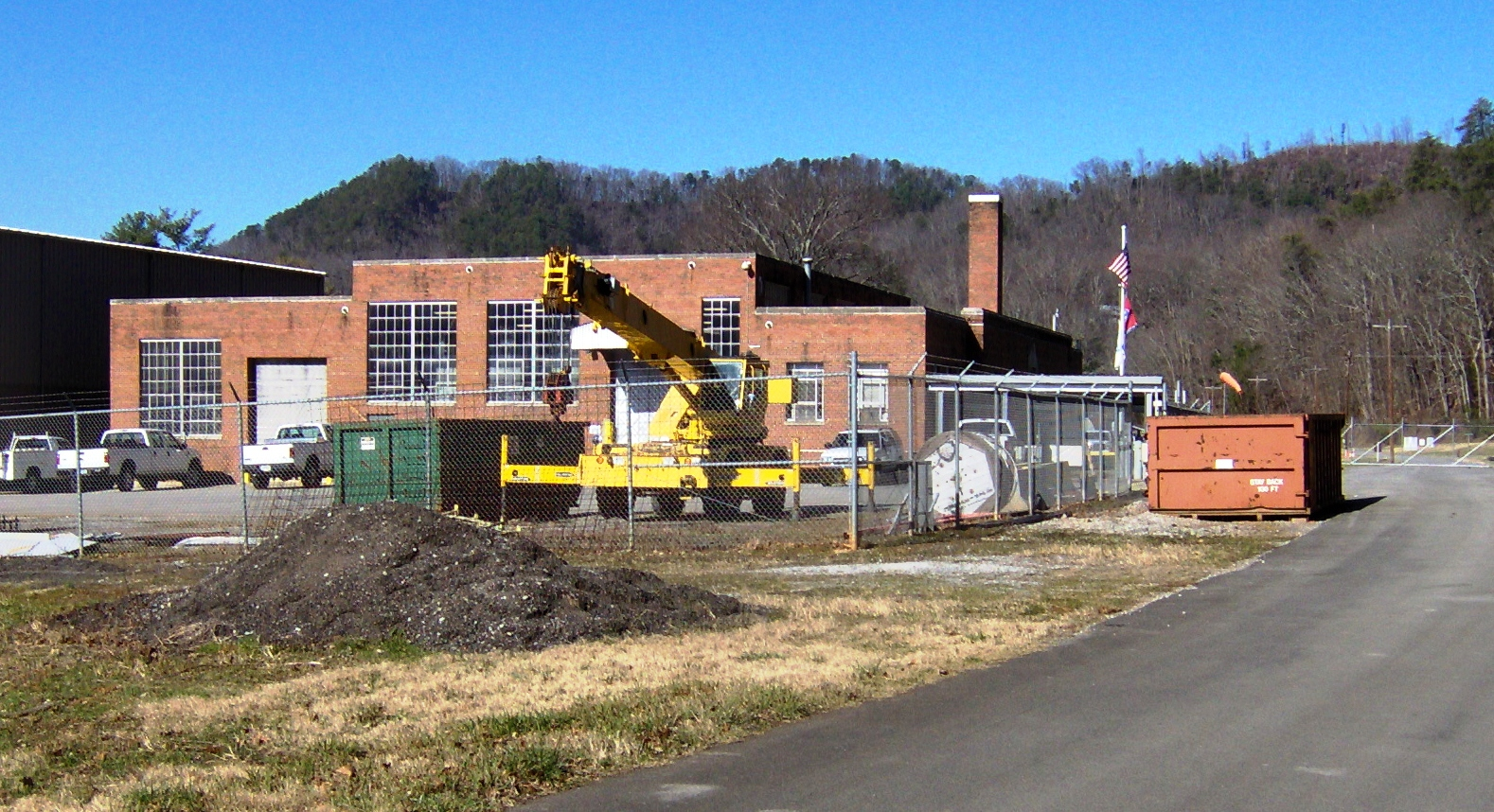
- Calderwood Dam service building

- Location within Tennessee Location within the United States
- Location: 314 Growdon Boulevard
- Nearest city: Maryville, Tennessee
- Coordinates: 35°29′56″N 83°59′15″W
- Area: 195 acres (79 ha)
- Built: 1930–1953
- Architect: A.V. Karpov, Tapoco Inc.
- Architectural style: Colonial Revival
- NRHP reference No.: 04000545
- Added to NRHP: May 24, 2004

Calderwood was a community once located along the Little Tennessee River in Blount County, Tennessee, United States. Established in 1912 as a base for the Aluminum Company of America's Little Tennessee Valley hydroelectric development operations, the community continued to house construction personnel and dam maintenance personnel for nearby Calderwood Dam until the 1960s. Although the community's houses were razed after its abandonment, three buildings located in the community— the Calderwood Dam service building, the Calderwood School, and a Quonset hut used as a theater— were included in a supplementary listing for Calderwood Dam on the National Register of Historic Places in 2004.

Alcoa began developing the Little Tennessee Valley in 1909 to provide the ample amounts of electricity necessary to power its planned aluminum smelting operations in Blount County. Under the leadership of Alcoa engineer Isaac Glidden Calderwood (1871–1941), three dams— Cheoah (1919), Santeetlah (1928), and Calderwood (1930)— were completed in a remote section of the valley along the Tennessee-North Carolina border. The community of Calderwood was initially known as "Alcoa," but was renamed in I. G. Calderwood's honor after the company reapplied the name "Alcoa" to its main company town in northern Blount County.

== Location ==
The Calderwood community was situated on the north bank (or Blount County side) of the Little Tennessee River, approximately 41 miles (66 km) upstream from the mouth of the river. This section of the river is technically part of Chilhowee Lake, which is impounded by Chilhowee Dam approximately 8 miles (13 km) downstream. Calderwood Dam is located 3 miles (4.8 km) upstream, on the opposite end of a horseshoe bend in the river. U.S. Route 129 provides the only major road access to the Calderwood area. Just past Calderwood, US-129 enters a switchback-laden stretch of road known as "The Dragon," which is popular with motorcyclists.

The surviving community structures and the Calderwood Dam service building are accessible via Housley Road, which connects US-129 with Growdon Road on the riverfront. The Calderwood Baptist Church is located about halfway down Housley Road in a wooded area on the left. At the intersection of Housley and Growdon, the service building is to the left, with a gated road (open to foot traffic) continuing to the powerhouse. To the right of the intersection, the road continues past the Calderwood School building and culminates at a boat ramp in the lake connected via causeway to the mainland. Just past the school building, an unmarked road leads up the cliff slope to the Calderwood Methodist Church and the former residential area.

== History ==
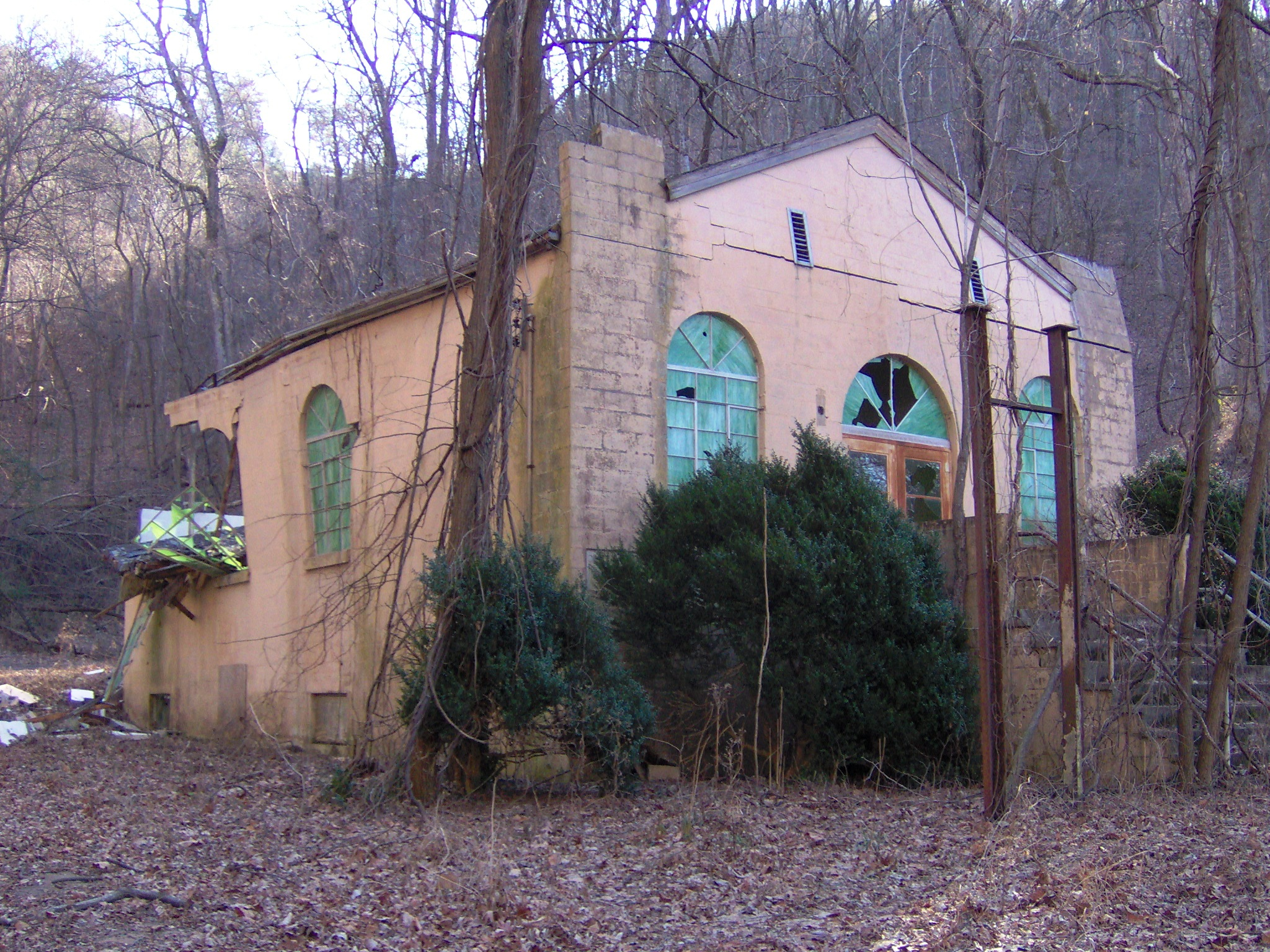
Calderwood Baptist Church

What is now Calderwood stands adjacent to what was once a narrow stretch of the river that for centuries was used as a ford by Native Americans. By the 18th century, the Overhill Cherokee village of Tallassee straddled both sides of this ford. This village was burned by Colonel John Sevier in 1788 in retaliation for the Nine Mile Creek massacre, which took place a few miles to the north.

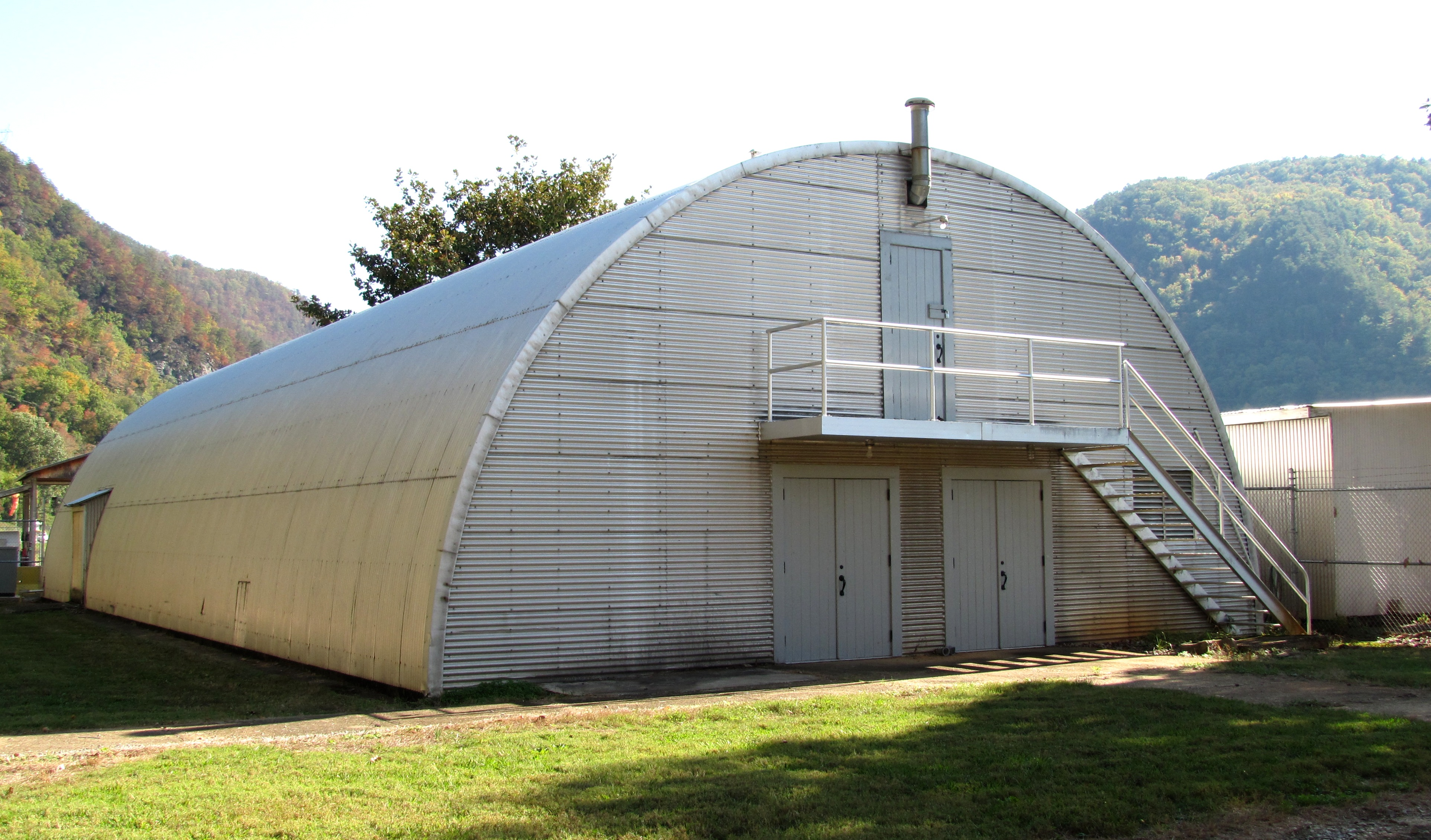
Quonset hut at Calderwood, once used as a theater

When Alcoa began developing the Little Tennessee Valley around 1909, the Calderwood area was part of a farm owned by Blount County farmer John Howard. After purchasing the property, company engineers began using it as a base of operations. In 1912, a post office was set up in the base camp, which initially used the company's name, "Alcoa." Under engineer I. G. Calderwood's leadership, a railroad line was constructed to connect the base camp with the Southern Railway terminal at Chilhowee (near modern Chilhowee Dam). Alcoa's Little Tennessee Valley plans were finalized in 1915, and construction crews began arriving at the company's base camp. Cheoah Dam was completed in 1919, and Santeetlah was completed in 1928.

In 1919, the large company town that housed the workers for Alcoa's aluminum plants, which had previously been known as "North Maryville," was incorporated under the company's name. The following year, the company renamed its Little Tennessee Valley construction camp "Calderwood" after its able head of operations in the valley, I. G. Calderwood. After the completion of Calderwood Dam in 1930, the construction camp evolved into a community that housed maintenance crews for the dam. Nearly two dozen residences were built, all following identical one-floor plans.

After World War II, Calderwood expanded. In 1950, a school was built, and a Quonset hut was installed in the community for use as a theater. The Calderwood Methodist Church was completed in 1954, and the Calderwood Baptist Church was completed the following year. Within a few years, the need for onsite crews diminished, however, and residents began moving away. By the late 1960s, Calderwood had been largely abandoned.

== Historical structures ==
Calderwood Dam was added to the National Register of Historic Places in 1989, and the dam's powerhouse, valve house, conduit tunnel, and penstocks were added in 1990. In 2004, several buildings in the Calderwood community— including the dam's service building, the school, and the Quonset-hut theater— along with the dam's gantry cranes and gatehouse, were added to the National Register. The residences in the community have all been razed, and only their foundations and two garages remain. The Calderwood Methodist Church is still intact, but the Calderwood Baptist Church has partially collapsed (the front facade remains). Neither church was included in the National Register listing.
