= Appalachian temperate rainforest =

Temperate rainforest in the Appalachian Mountains

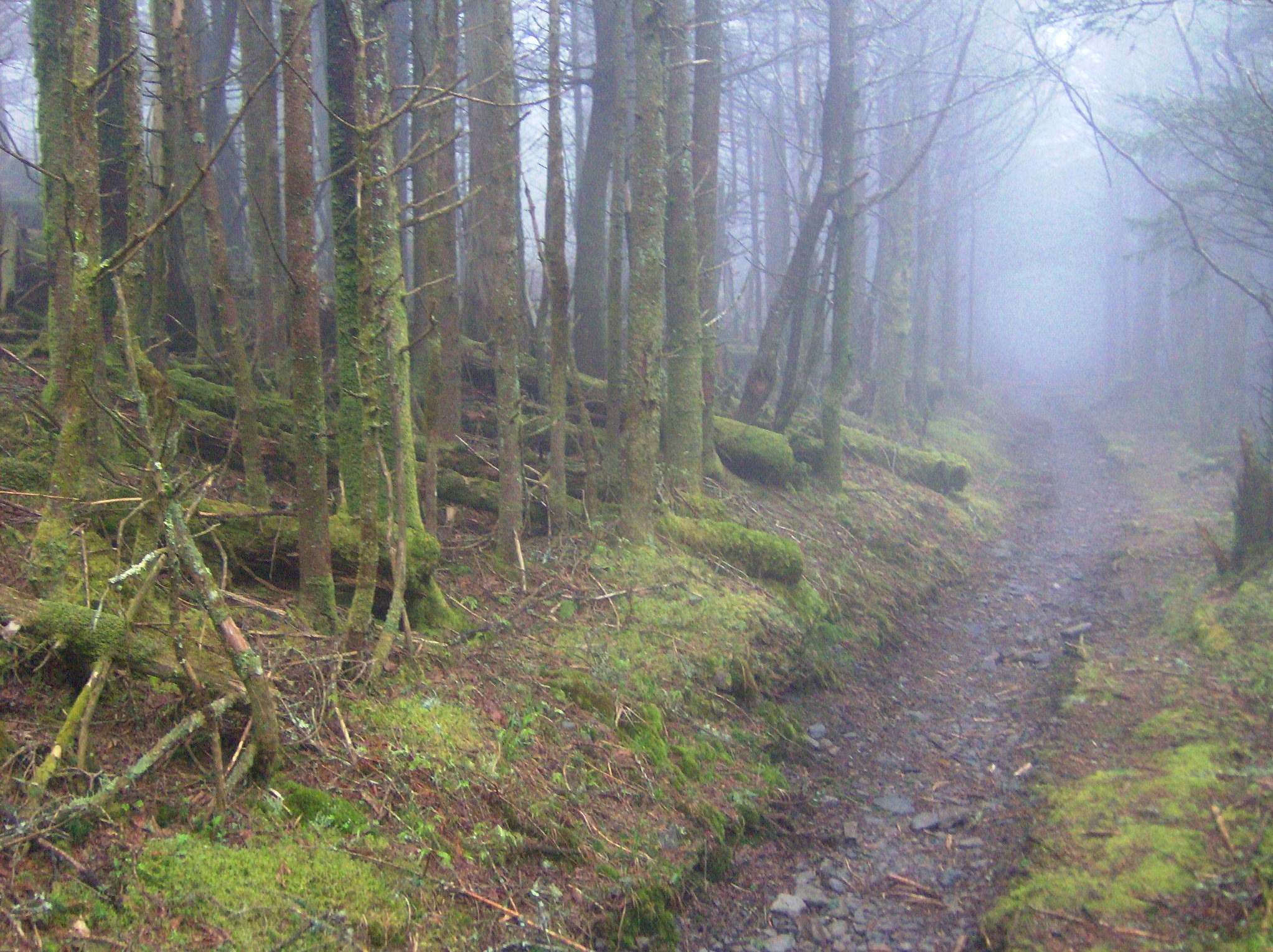
- The Appalachian Trail traverses the dense, moss-covered spruce–fir understory near the summit of Old Black in the Great Smoky Mountains of Tennessee.

Ecology
- Realm: Nearctic
- Biome: Temperate broadleaf and mixed forests
- Bird species: >240
- Mammal species: 68

Geography
- Country: United States
- Elevation: Up to 6,684 feet (2,037 m)
- Climate type: Oceanic climate (Cfb) and humid continental (Dfb)

The Appalachian temperate rainforest or Appalachian cloud forest is located in the southern Appalachian Mountains of the eastern United States and is among the most biodiverse temperate regions in the world. Centered primarily around Southern Appalachian spruce–fir forests between southwestern Virginia and southwestern North Carolina, it has a cool, mild climate with highly variable temperature and precipitation patterns linked to elevation. The temperate rainforest as a whole has a mean annual temperature near 7 °C (45 °F) and annual precipitation exceeding 140 centimeters (55 in), though the highest peaks can reach more than 200 centimeters (79 in) and are frequently shrouded in fog.

Due to variable microclimates across different elevations, the rainforest is able to support both southern and northern species, including some which were forced south during the Last Ice Age. Dominated by evergreen spruce and fir forests at higher elevations and deciduous cove forests at lower elevations, the ecosystem contains thousands of plant species, including epiphytes, orchids, and numerous mosses and ferns. It is also home to many animals and fungi, including endangered and endemic species, reaching the highest diversities of mushrooms, salamanders, land snails, and millipedes in the world.

Humans have shaped the rainforest environment for the last 12,000 years through activities such as hunting and agriculture. These impacts grew following European colonization, which brought about significant changes, including the decline of native populations, land use alterations, and the introduction of non-native species. By the 1880s, industrialization left the forest devastated by mining, logging and the introduction of destructive invasive species, examples being chestnut blight and the balsam woolly adelgid. Conservation efforts, such as the establishment of national forests and parks, have helped preserve the ecosystem, though it continues to face ongoing threats such as wildfire and climate change.

== Definition ==
In order to be defined as a rainforest, the forest must average at least 140 cm (55 in) of precipitation annually and a temperate rainforest as opposed to a tropical rainforest is defined by a mean annual temperature between 4 and 12 degrees Celsius (39 and 54 degrees Fahrenheit). Some sources however say even at least 50 inches of precipitation annually qualifies an area as being a rainforest. On the other hand, the book Temperate and Boreal Rainforests of the World states that a temperate rainforest is defined by least 1,200 mm (47.24 inches) of average annual precipitation. Alaback also adds some additional criteria to the definition of a temperate rainforest as having at least 10% of its average annual precipitation during the summer months, cool and frequently overcast summers with average July temperature less than 16 degrees Celsius (60.8 degrees Fahrenheit), and forest fires or wildfires are rare and do not play an important role in the forest ecosystem. It must also be dense and lush with a rich understory and epiphytes.

== Climate ==
The Appalachian temperate rainforest has a cool and mild climate and meets the criteria of temperate rainforests identified by forest ecologist Paul Alaback. Temperature and precipitation are extremely variable with elevation, with rainforest conditions usually but not always concentrated around spruce–fir forests at higher elevations. These spruce–fir forests have an annual mean temperature of 6.5 °C (43.7 °F) and a growing season mean (May–September) of 13.5 °C (56.3 °F), though this is likely somewhat cooler than the average across the entire rainforest ecosystem. It has annual precipitation above 140 centimetres (55 in), a cool summer, typical transient snow in winter, mean annual temperature near 7 °C (45 °F), and summer rainfall is above 10% of overall precipitation, classifying it as a perhumid temperate rainforest.

Annual precipitation varies significantly within the mountainous terrain, with the highest precipitation in southwest North Carolina. High altitudes hosting spruce–fir forest receive more than 2,000 millimeters (79 in) of precipitation while large swaths of lower elevation rainforest receive more than 1,525 millimeters (60 in). This pattern is primarily influenced by upslope and downslope flow of southerly winds. The orographic effect causes rainfall when moist air originating in the Gulf of Mexico and western Atlantic Ocean is forced upwards by the mountains. Winter and spring months see a gradient precipitation pattern, with higher rainfall concentrated in the south. Weak upslope air flow in summer brings more precipitation to the highest elevations, while autumn is typically driest with occasional intense rainfall from tropical systems.

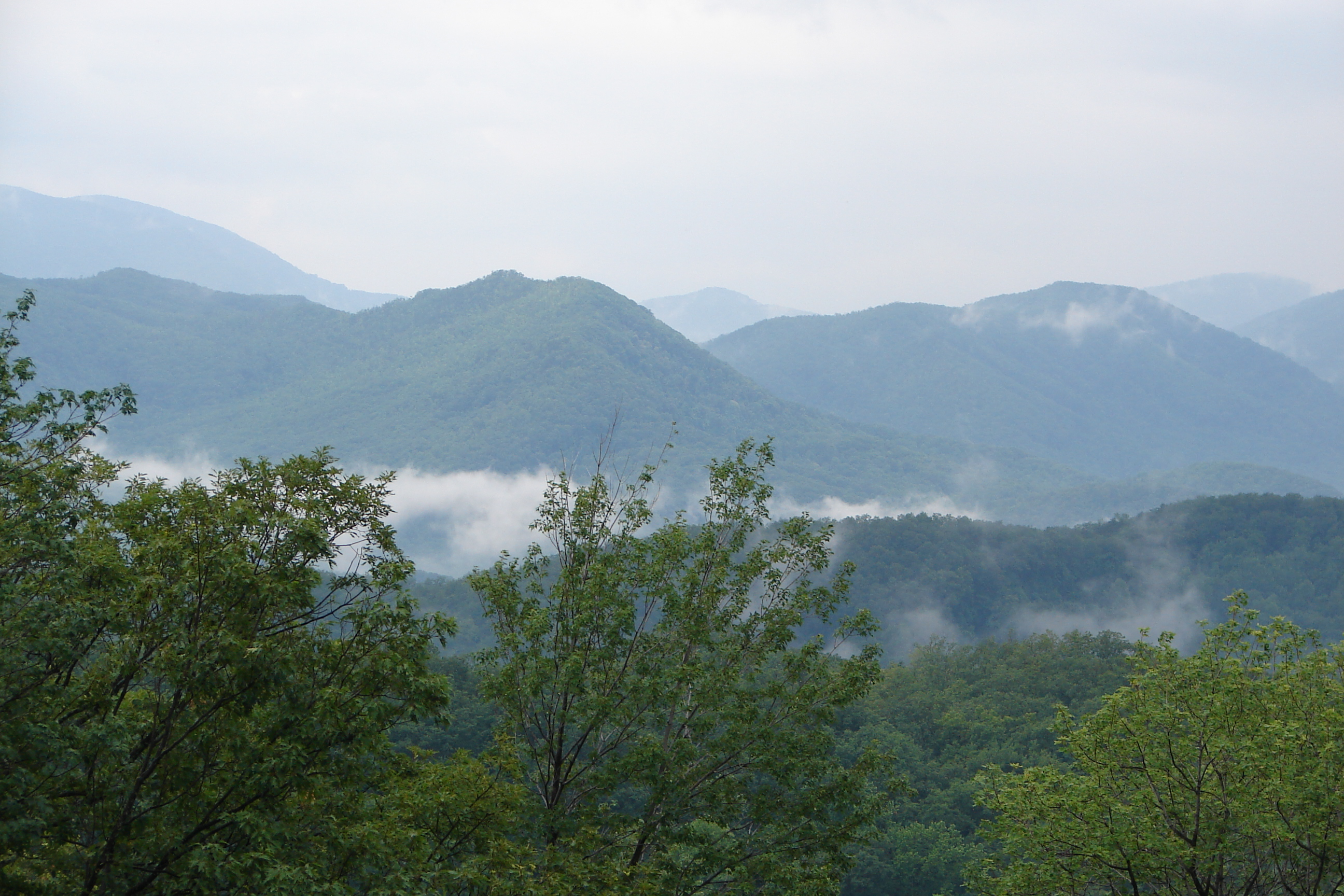
Persistent fog covers the Smokies, sometimes called a cloud forest.

In addition to the increased precipitation from orographic lift, cloud cover keeps the rate of water loss low due to minimal evapotranspiration. High elevation forests are immersed in clouds on 65% of growth-season days, leading some sources to describe the temperate rainforest as a cloud forest. Water intercepted from clouds accounts for 25% to 50% of annual precipitation, which is a high rate. For comparison, in the boreal rainforests of Eastern Canada, fog contributes only 5 to 8% of annual precipitation. According to a tentative classification advocated by DellaSala, Alaback, Spribille, Wehrden, and Nauman in 2011, high-elevation temperate rainforest regions in Central Appalachia could be interpreted as "a southerly extension of Appalachian boreal rainforests from Eastern Canada", although this interpretation requires further study.

== Locations ==
The locations that are part of the Appalachian temperate rainforest include western North Carolina and eastern Tennessee. In western North Carolina, the rainforest includes Pisgah National Forest, Nantahala National Forest, Gorges State Park, DuPont State Forest, Chatahoochee-Oconee National Forest, and elsewhere in the Blue Ridge Mountains. The Great Smoky Mountains National Park which covers parts of North Carolina and Tennessee, is also part of the rainforest. The Appalachian temperate rainforest also includes the mountains in Northern Georgia such as Chattahoochee–Oconee National Forest, southwestern Virginia, northwestern South Carolina, and southeastern Kentucky.

== Ecology ==
High precipitation levels, moderate year-round temperatures, and diverse terrain enable a wide range of species to survive. The rainforest is more biodiverse than any temperate region of similar size in the world, with over 19,000 species identified in Great Smoky Mountains National Park alone. However, scientists estimate the real number of species may be as high as 100,000 or more. It is also home to many threatened, endangered, and endemic species, including plants, fungi, arthropods, fish, mammals, mollusks, and amphibians.

=== Flora ===
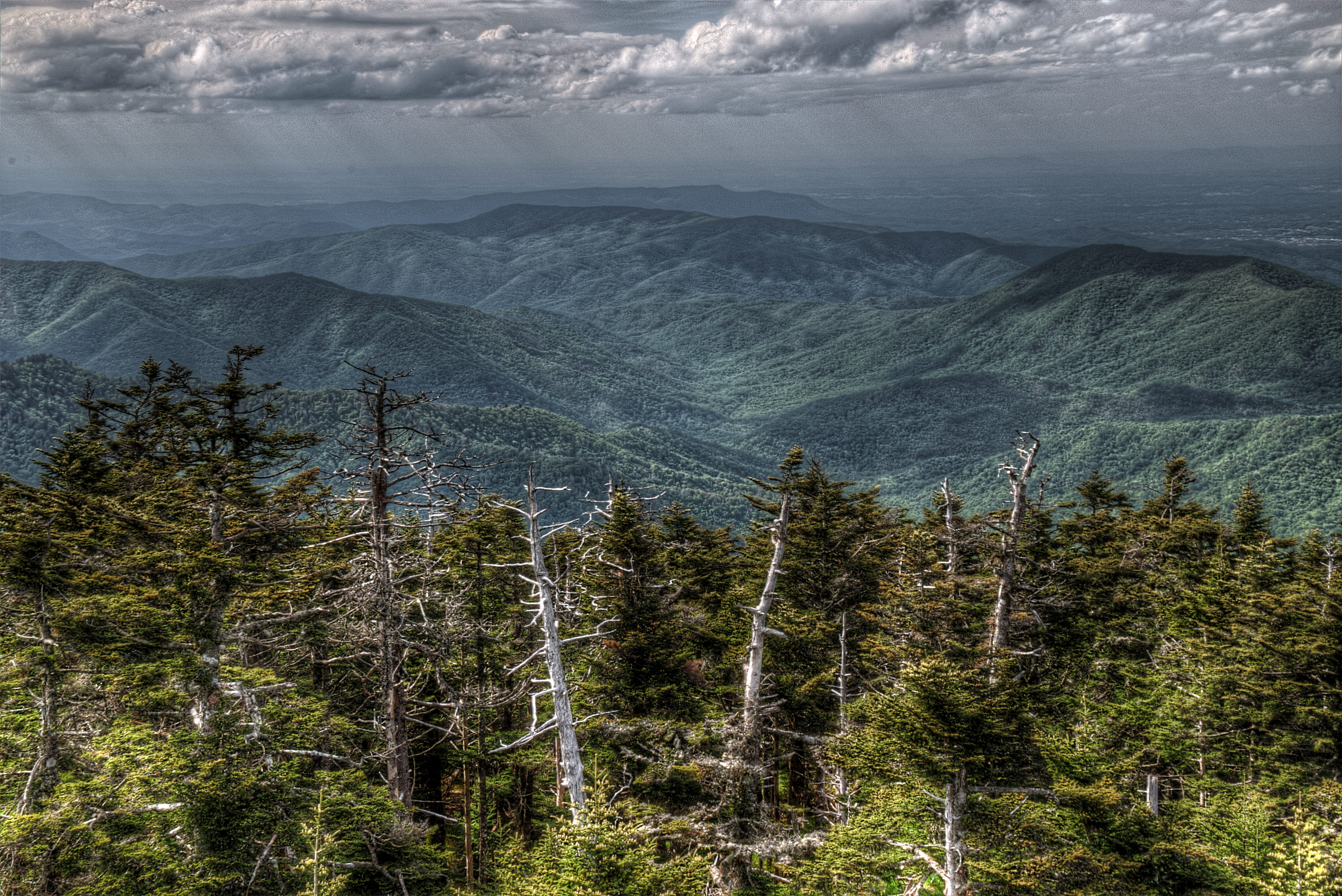
Darker evergreen spruce and fir forests dominate the cooler and wetter mountaintops while lighter deciduous trees are prevalent at lower elevations, a common pattern across the entire rainforest.

Red spruce and Fraser fir are dominant canopy trees in high mountain areas. In higher elevations (over 1,980 meters or 6,500 feet), Fraser fir is dominant; in middle elevations (1,675 to 1,890 meters or 5,495 to 6,201 feet) red spruce and Fraser fir grow together; and in lower elevation (1,370 to 1,650 meters or 4,490 to 5,410 feet) red spruce is dominant. The understory comprises trees such as Yellow birch, mountain ash, mountain maple, younger spruce and fir and shrubs like raspberry, blackberry, hobblebush, southern mountain cranberries, red elderberry, minniebush, and southern bush honeysuckle. Below the spruce–fir forest, at around 1,200 meters (3,900 ft), forest composition shifts in favor of deciduous trees such as American beech, maple, birch, and oak. American rhododendron is the dominant understory shrub throughout the deciduous layer but is only occasionally present in spruce–fir forests. Eastern skunk cabbage and common juniper are northern species that remained in this region after glaciers retreated. The American Sycamore (Platanus occidentalis) is found at various points.

In addition to over 100 species of native trees, 1,400 other flowering plants and 500 moss and fern species live in the rainforest habitat. These include a diverse array of wildflowers and dozens of fungi-reliant orchid species. The rainforest's high humidity supports epiphytic plant species at greater height and diversity than elsewhere in the eastern United States. A wide range of mosses, ferns, and liverworts have been identified as high as 140 feet (43 m) above the forest floor. These include common epiphytes like resurrection fern, the endemic liverwort Bazzania nudicaulis, and some species that are solely terrestrial in the rest of their range including Appalachian rockcap fern, rose moss, and narrow-fruited crisp-moss. Lianas are also prevalent, especially in deciduous forest, with Virginia creeper, poison ivy, and various grapevines being the most common.

=== Fauna ===
With 30 identified species, the rainforest is home to the highest diversity of salamanders in the world. Several of these species are endemic to the region, including the black mountain salamander, southern dusky salamander, red-cheeked salamander, and Cheat Mountain salamander. Many species of salamander in this area do not have lungs, and breathe through their skin instead, so the wet environment of rotten trees and moist leaves is conducive for their survival.

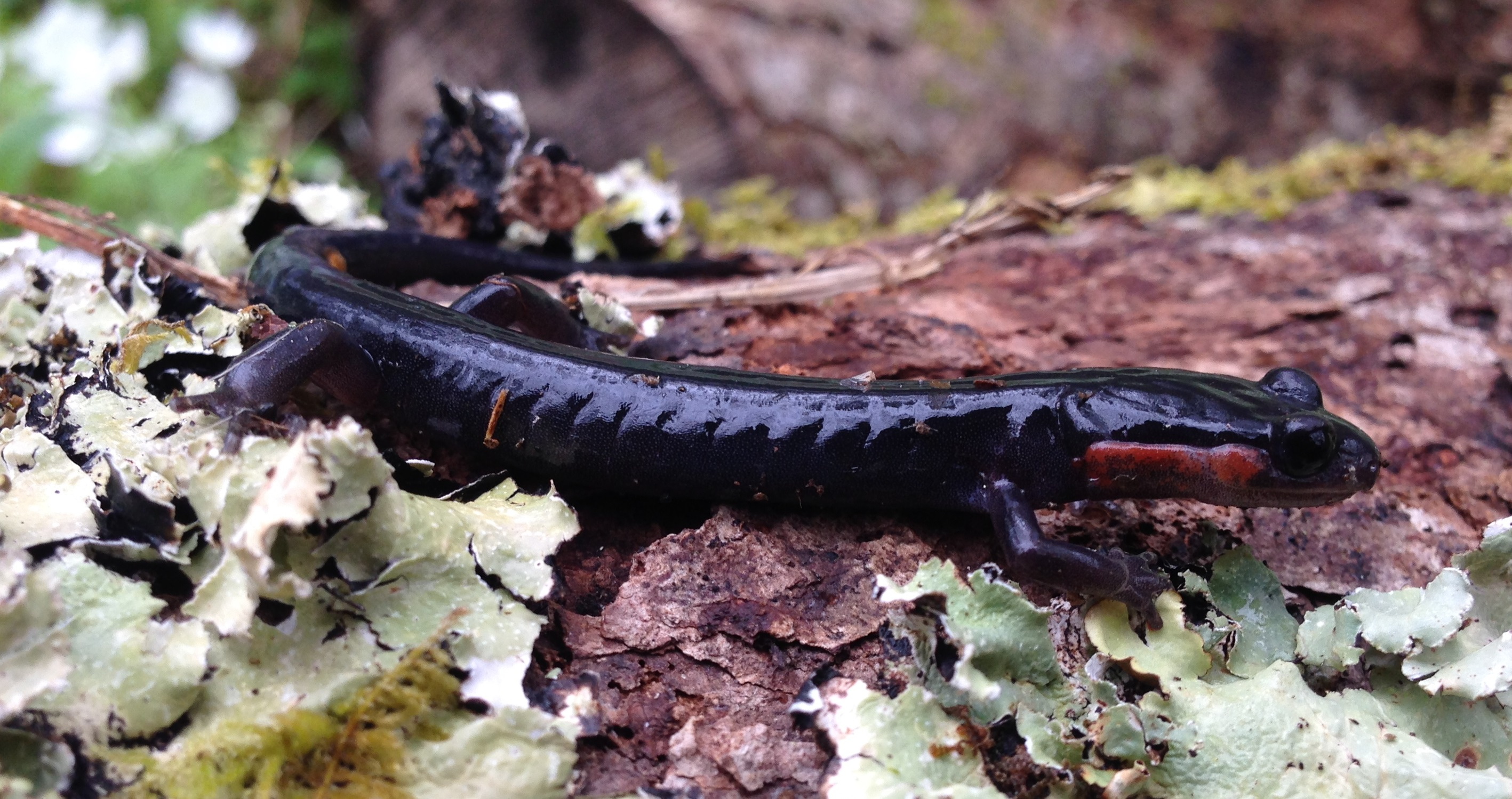
The red-cheeked salamander is one of many species of salamander endemic to the Appalachian temperate rainforest.

Larger animals include the American black bear, white-tailed deer, wild turkey, and groundhog. Many large species once lived in the area, but were extirpated by land-use and hunting changes brought about by European colonization. These include bison, elk, mountain lion, gray wolf, red wolf, fisher, river otter, peregrine falcon, and several species of fish. Northern species including the Carolina northern flying squirrel, American red squirrel, and saw-whet owl are relics of the Last Ice Age that survive in the area because of the cool climate. Mollusks and millipedes reach their highest levels of biodiversity in the region, with about 150 species of land snails and 230 species of millipedes documented thus far, though species estimates for both are much higher. It is also home to 460 arachnid species including the endangered spruce–fir moss spider, which lives nowhere else in the world.

=== Fungi ===
The wet montane environment supports one of the world's highest diversities of fungi including lichens, sac fungi, molds, and mushrooms. In total, over 2,300 species have been identified in the area and scientists estimate the actual number may be as high as 20,000. Of the species discovered thus far, 800 (40%) are lichens.

== History ==
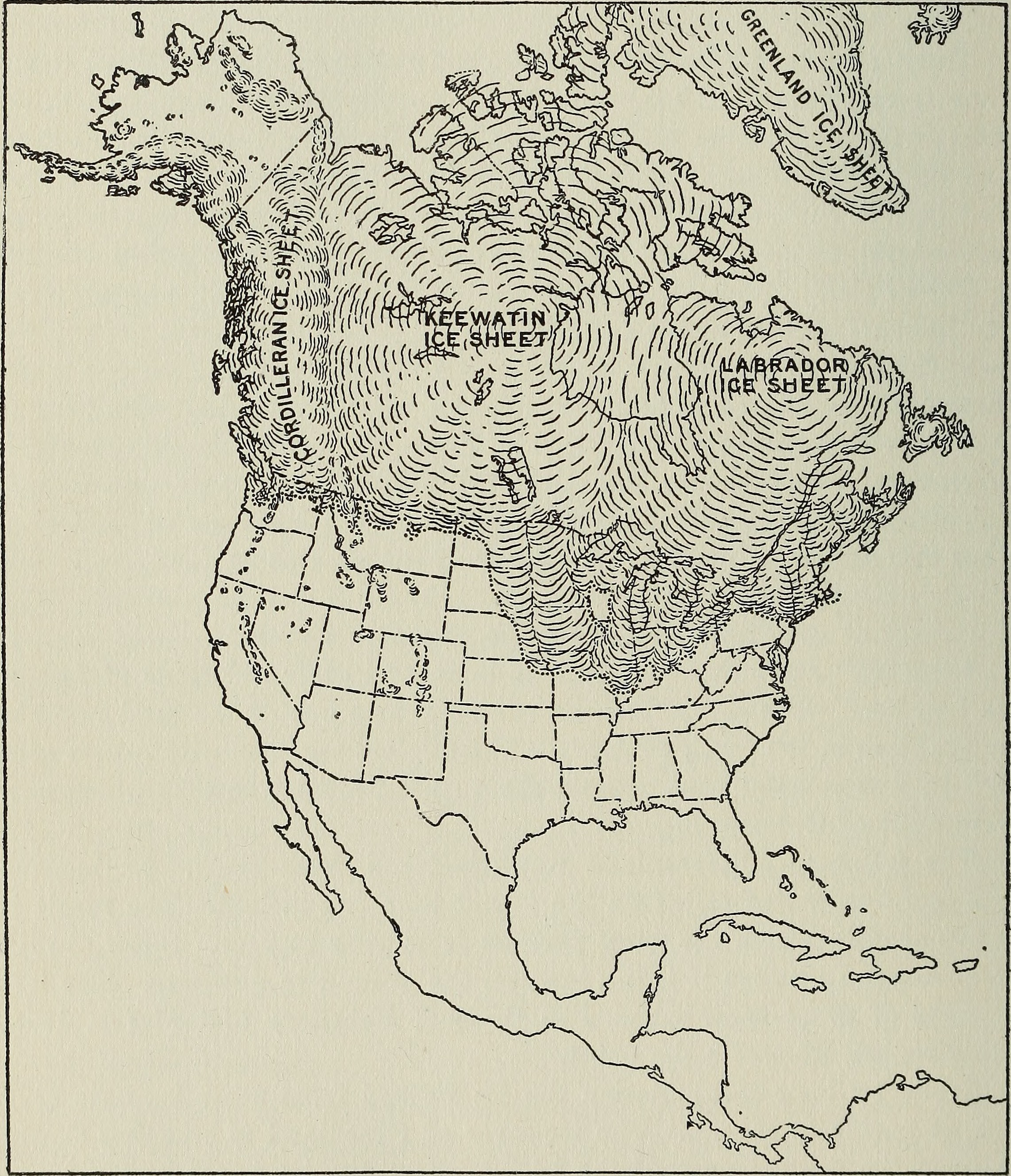
The southern Appalachians were left uncovered by glaciation during the Last Ice Age.

The Appalachian Mountains began to form 460 million years ago with the collision of tectonic plates, and finished their uplift around 230 million years ago. During the Last Ice Age, ice covered much of northern North America, but the southern Appalachians remained ice-free. This uncovered area acted as a refuge for species that were forced southward. After the ice receded, some species spread back north, but many stayed in the southern Appalachians. Because temperature declines with increased elevation, the varying topography of the mountains forms microclimates that mimic both northern and southern latitudes. This has combined with a relatively stable year-round climate to enable northern and southern species to live in close proximity each other, lending the rainforest its high biodiversity.

=== Pre-colonial ===
Around 12,000 years ago, Paleo-Indians first settled in the Southern Appalachians, crafting stone projectile points from local materials, indicating their long-term inhabitance. However, evidence for residential activities in the highlands are absent prior to about 7,500 BCE, though the archaeological record does indicate hunting, flintworking, butchering, hideworking, and woodworking in the region. Throughout the Archaic period, Paleo-Indians adopted more advanced technologies such as textiles, basketry, and the atlatl and transitioned from hunter-gatherer activities towards an increasing reliance on fishing and the emergence of agriculture in lowlands. Human activities increased the dispersal of edible plants, including trees, shrubs, grasses, and lianas.

Cultural developments accelerated with the adoption of agriculture in the highlands in the Middle Woodland period, delayed relative to the lowlands by rugged terrain, low population, limited fertile soil, and a shorter growing season. As intensive plant husbandry expanded through the introduction of corn, beans, pumpkin, squash, and tobacco by around 1000 CE, more complex societies centered around permanent villages in Appalachian river valleys appeared. Meanwhile, human activity shaped the surrounding landscape into a patchwork of towns, farmsteads, fields, and primary forests for hunting and gathering.

=== Colonial ===
Following European arrival in the region, native populations faced rapid decline due to both European intrusions and Old World diseases, leading to the disruption and collapse of many American Indian societies. European trade and exploration had further impacts, such as the introduction of iron tools, exotic plants and animals, and increasing conflicts between American Indians and Europeans. Due to depopulation, many abandoned fields were reclaimed by secondary forests. When restrictions on westward European settlement were lifted following the American Revolution, European migration increased and Euro-American communities began to grow. However, the resistance of American Indian groups like the Chickamauga Cherokee delayed expansion into much of the rainforested region until 1790.

Roads were quickly built, and by the early 1800s the US had full control of the region. While valleys were farmed intensively, land use changed little in high-elevations, though European livestock were introduced. Similarly, most industry remained agricultural prior to the 1880s, though some logging and small-scale gold and copper mining began. During this period, bounties on predators drove them to near-extinction, bison and elk were extirpated, and trapping decimated fur-yielding species. Moreover, the vast majority of the Cherokee Nation were forced to move from their traditional homeland to Oklahoma during the Trail of Tears. However, about 9,000 members of the tribe continue to live inside the Qualla Boundary, which lies within the rainforest biome.

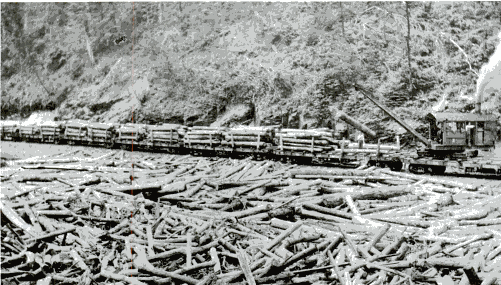
Harvested logs being loaded onto railroad flatcars in Polk County, Tennessee in 1912

By the 1880s, Appalachia's natural resources had drawn the attention of industrialist Civil War veterans and vacationers from the North, buying up land and dramatically expanding the nascent railway system. While Appalachia is famous for its coal, mica mining was far more dominant in rainforested areas, and logging remained generally confined to the valleys along significant rail lines. However, as outside investors bought up growing tracts of land and Appalachia's railroad system matured, increasing swathes of forest were cleared. By the 1900s and 1910s, even the spruce–fir forests of Mount Mitchell—the highest peak in the Appalachian Mountains—had begun being logged.

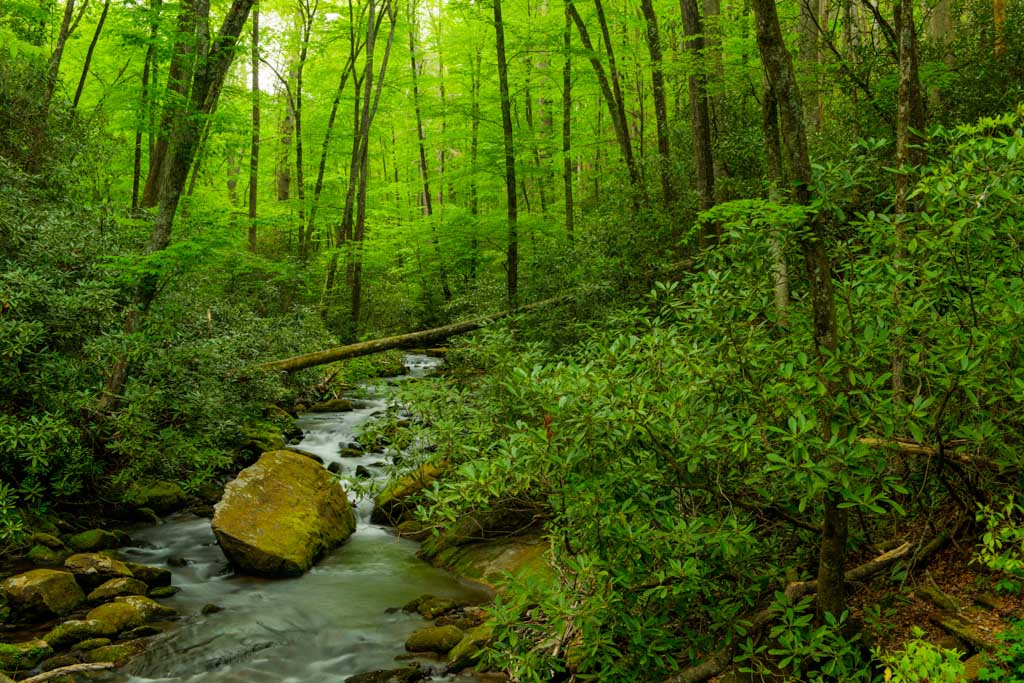
A wooded stream in Joyce Kilmer Memorial Forest, part of the Nantahala National Forest

The early 1900s were devastating for the rainforest landscape. Wolves, beavers, and mountain lions vanished; bear, turkey, and deer populations plummeted; and exotic invasives like chestnut blight, wild boar, and rainbow trout were introduced. Contemporaneously, devastating flooding of the Monongahela and Ohio Rivers in 1907 was attributed to clearing of upstream watersheds. Encouraged by these factors and the Appalachian National Park Association (founded in 1899), Congress passed the Weeks Act in 1911 to enable the purchase of Federal lands in the Eastern United States. Beginning with the creation of the Pisgah National Forest in 1916, much of the rainforest area is now conserved.

== Threats ==
=== Fire ===
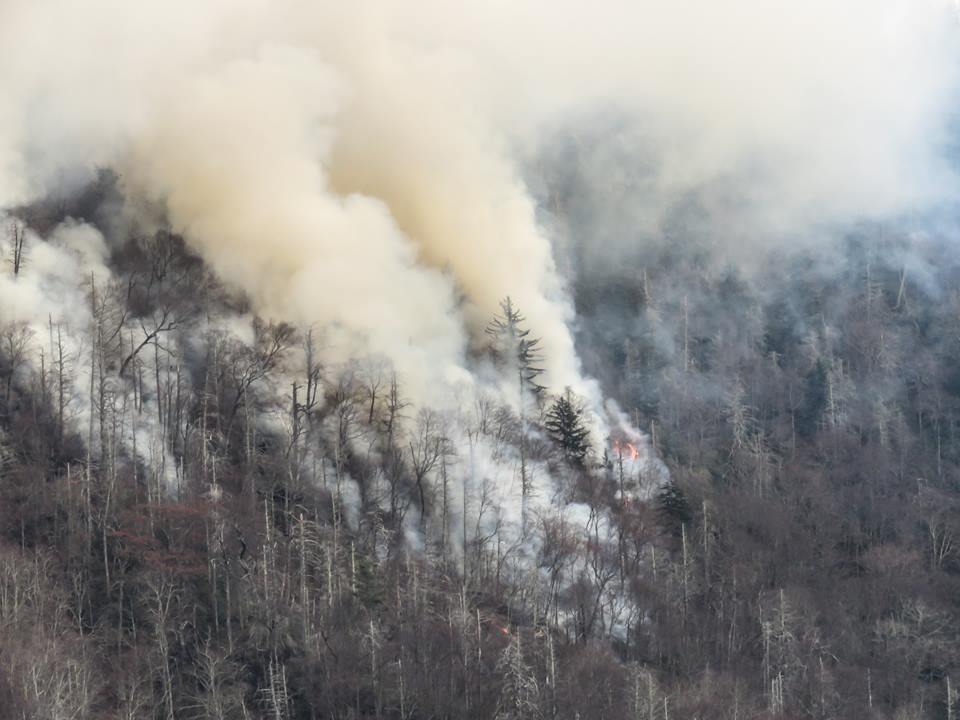
The 2016 Chimney Tops 2 Fire burns on a mountainside near Gatlinburg, Tennessee.

Wildfires are a natural ecological process that has occurred within the Southern Appalachian temperate rainforest for millennia and plays an important role in the Southern Appalachian temperate rainforest ecosystem. However, fire suppression instituted after European colonization has created two significant issues in the region: a higher risk of "catastrophic wildfires", and declines in the abundance of disturbance-dependent species like Table Mountain pine and woodpeckers. After the 2016 Great Smoky Mountains wildfires, the National Park Service put increased effort into controlled burns "to invigorate a species or ecosystem that benefits from fire" and "reduce heavy accumulations of dead wood and brush which under drought conditions could produce catastrophic wildfires that threaten human life and valuable property." Natural wildfire is most frequent during the month of May in the rainforest, when lightning is sometimes common depending on the year.

=== Pollution and climate change ===
High peaks in the temperate rainforest have some of the highest air pollution of any region in the Eastern United States, with a 1999 study finding sulfate and nitrate deposition 6–20 times higher than lower elevation sites. This is primarily due to pollutants from cars and coal plants settling in Appalachian valleys, trapped by the high mountain ridges. However, because this pollution is overwhelmingly deposited through acid fog, it is the wettest (highest) areas that receive the most pollution. This deposition often has a pH below 4.0 and sometimes below 3.0, having significant impacts on tree cation concentrations, potentially leading to dangerous nutrient deficiencies.

Similarly, anthropogenic climate change will have numerous and varied impacts in the rainforest, which may be difficult to predict. These impacts will likely be felt in the relict high elevation spruce–fir forests that heavily rely on cold temperatures and near-constant fog. Any change in cloud patterns or height could significantly disrupt the cloud-based deposition this forest type relies on for up to 50% of their water budget, forcing them upslope until extirpation. However, it has been hypothesized that higher elevations may be more resistant to climactic change. Similarly, climate change is predicted to increase the rate of wildfires and place more stress on existing forests, leading them more susceptible to current threats.

=== Invasive species ===
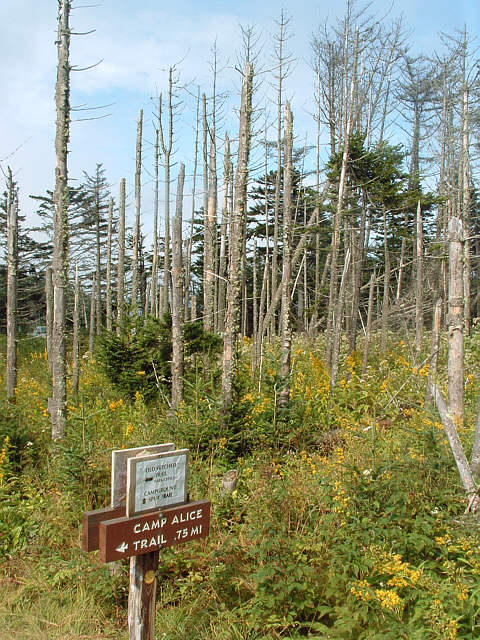
A ghost forest of dead fraser fir stands in Mount Mitchell State Park, North Carolina.

Invasive species pose a significant risk to the landscape of the Appalachian temperate rainforest, with two major introduction events since the early 20th century. First, the chestnut blight emerged in Appalachia, decimating American chestnut trees, a dominant species in the region. Originally a fungal pathogen introduced from Asia, the blight quickly spread, wiping out vast populations of mature chestnuts and dramatically altering the composition of forests across the Eastern US. While the trees once made up as much as 25% of hardwood forest stands, the American chestnut is now critically endangered and largely extirpated from its natural range.

Similarly, the balsam woolly adelgid was introduced from Europe in the 20th century and devastated fraser fir stands on the rainforest's mountaintops. First discovered on Mount Mitchell in 1957, it quickly spread to all fir populations. Fir mortality in Appalachia rose by 1,600% by 1970, eventually killing two-thirds of adult trees. Initial efforts to control the adelgid largely failed, complicating repopulation efforts. Though there are signs of recovery in recent years—such as Kuwohi having three times more adult trees in 2020 than in the 1980s—these threats to the forest are not independent and scientists warn climate change may lead to another adelgid outbreak. Kristine Johnson, supervisory forester at the Great Smoky Mountains National Park, has suggested that warm winters and dry summers could support a resurgence of balsam woolly adelgid outbreaks.

== See also ==
- Appalachian-Blue Ridge forests
- Southern Appalachian spruce–fir forest
- Cove (Appalachian Mountains) § Cove forest
