= Wears Valley, Tennessee =

Wears Valley
- Unincorporated community
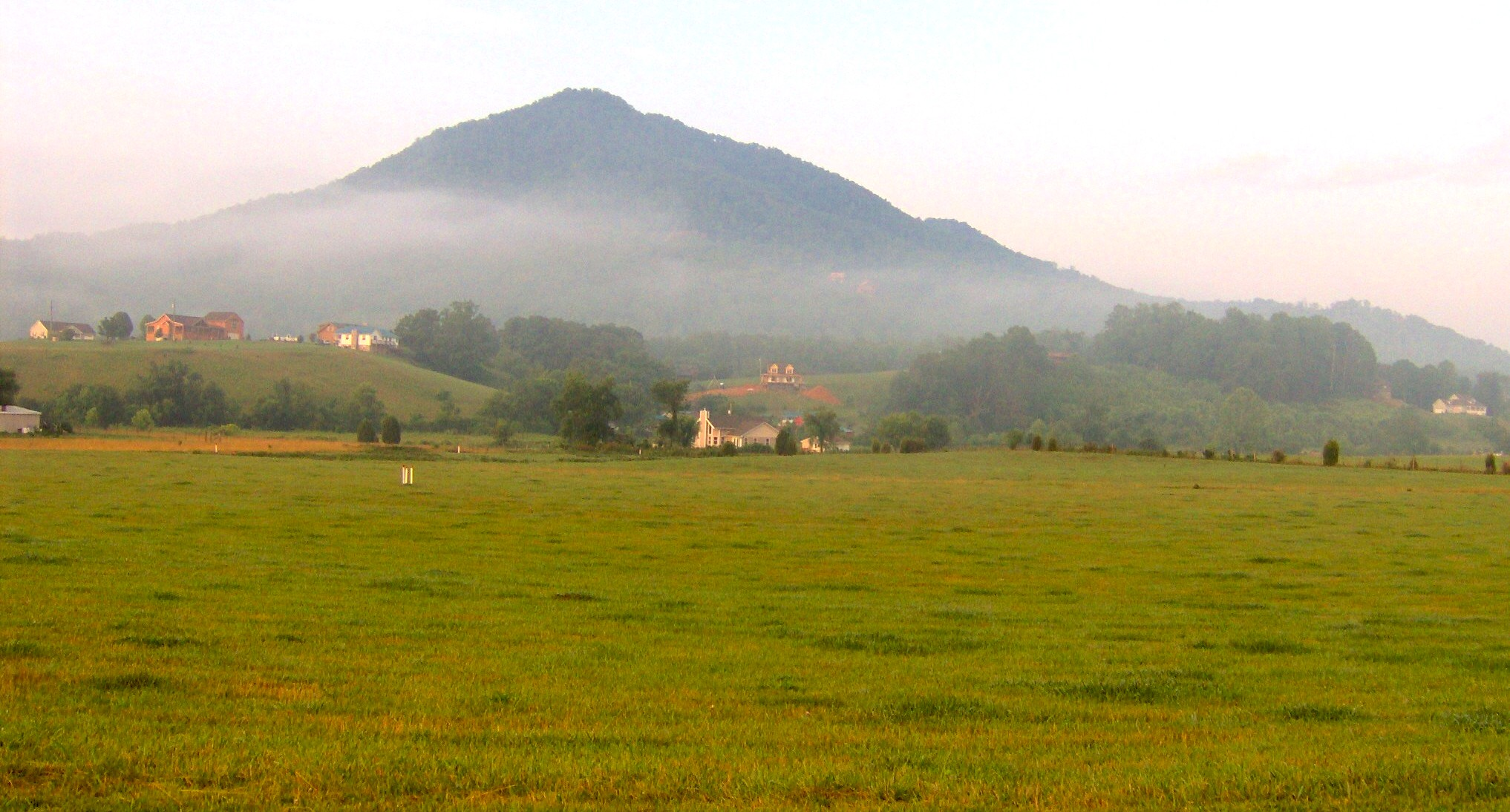
- Roundtop Mountain overlooking Wears Valley

- Location within the state of Tennessee Wears Valley (the United States)
- Coordinates: 35°42′50″N 83°39′11″W
- Country: United States
- State: Tennessee
- County: Sevier

Population (2010)
  - Total: 7,486
- Time zone: UTC-5 (Eastern (EST))
  - Summer (DST): UTC-4 (EDT)
- ZIP codes: 37862
- Area code: 865
- GNIS feature ID: 1304427

Wears Valley (sometimes spelled Wear Valley) is an unincorporated community in Sevier County, Tennessee that was formerly treated by the U.S. Census Bureau as a census county division. As of the 2000 Census, the population of Wears Valley was 6,486.

Wears Valley is situated in a valley known as Wear Cove, which runs parallel to the Great Smoky Mountains National Park. Like other park border communities, the history and economy of the valley are intertwined with that of the Smokies.

Both are named after Samuel Wear (1753–1817), a Revolutionary War veteran who erected a fort near the entrance to Wear Cove in what is now Pigeon Forge.

== Demographics ==
As of the census of 2000, there were 6,486 people, 2,585 households, and 1,955 families residing in Wears Valley. The racial makeup of this area was 97.7% White, 0.4% Native American, 0.5% Asian, and 0.5% African American. Hispanics and Latinos comprise 1.8% of the population.

Of the 2,585 households, 30.0% had children under the age of 18 living with them, 66.6% were married couples living together, 7.3% had a female householder with no husband present, and 24.4% were non-families. 20.3% of all households were made up of individuals, and 7.4% had someone living alone who was 65 years of age or older. The average household size was 2.51 and the average family size was 2.89.

77.8% of the population was 18 years of age or older with 12.3% being 65 years of age or older. The median age was 40.2 years. The population was 49.9% male and 50.1% female.

The median income for a household in the area was $34,479, and the median income for a family was $39,901. The per capita income was $17,422. About 9.1% of families and 15.0% of the population were below the poverty line.

== Geography ==
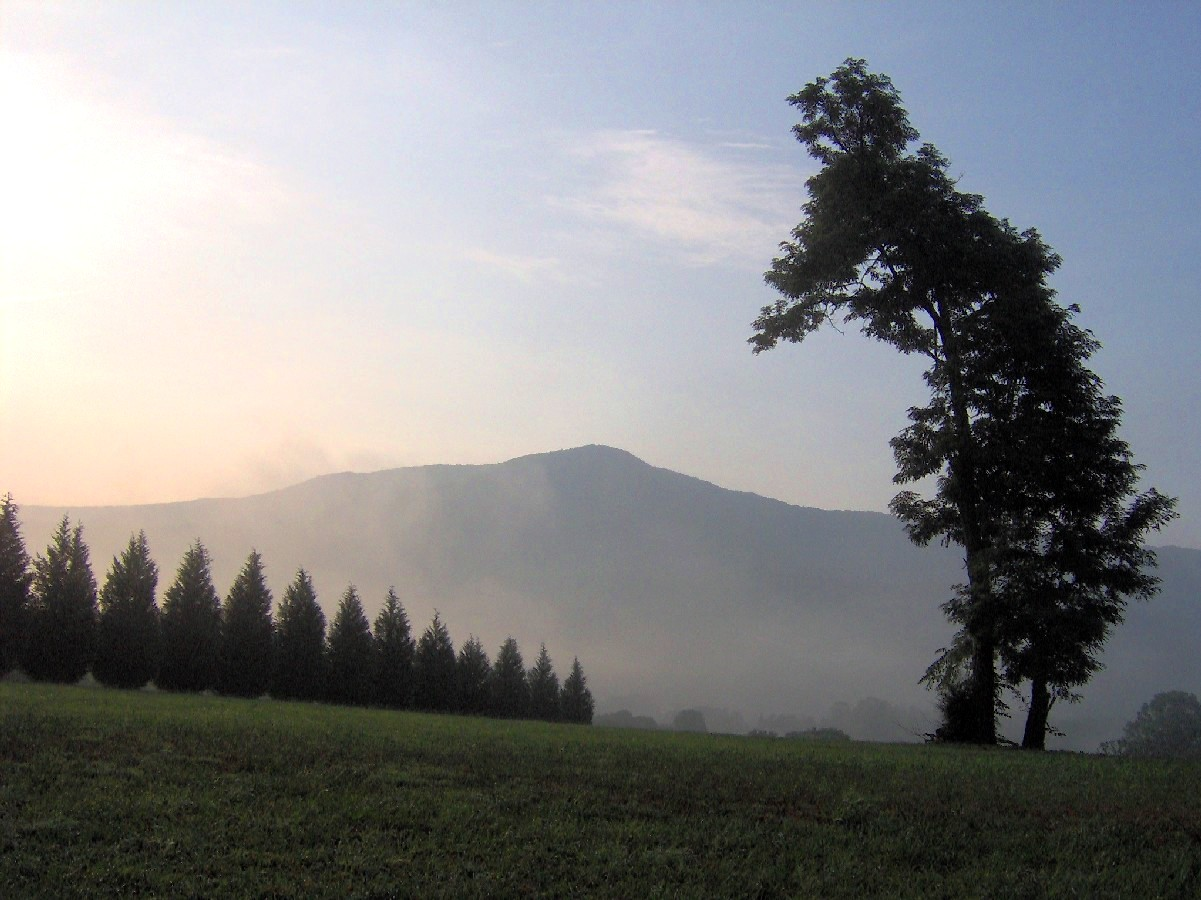
Cove Mountain rising above Wears Valley

Wears Valley is centered at 35°42′50″N 83°39′11″W (35.7139, -83.6531). The community covers most of Wear Cove, with the national park boundary comprising the town's entire southern border and the Blount/Sevier county line providing its western border.

U.S. Route 321 / Tennessee State Route 73 is the community's main road, connecting Townsend in the west with Pigeon Forge in east, where it merges with U.S. 441. This section of 321/73 is known as "Wears Valley Road". Line Springs Road connects Wears Valley Road with Little River Road inside the national park, crossing Wear Cove Gap between Cove Mountain and Roundtop and emerging at the Metcalf Bottoms picnic area. Upon entering the park at the gap, it becomes Wear Cove Gap Road, a narrow road without lines, which now provides a shortcut from the park to the new end of the parkway.

Since opening in November 2018, this new section of the Foothills Parkway connects Wears Valley to the existing parkway at Walland to the west-northwest. Most of this was already finished (in the 1960s) or nearly so, but the "missing link" section northeast of Townsend had to be completed with a series of bridges before the section could finally open. The section east of Wears Valley (at 321/73) to Pigeon Forge and beyond is completely unconstructed, and will not occur in the foreseeable future.

== History ==
=== Early settlement ===
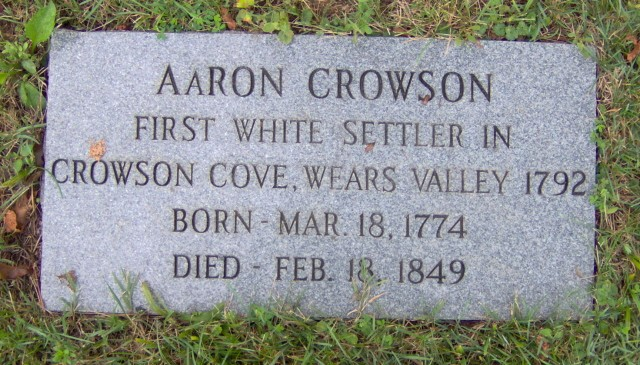
Aaron Crowson's grave at Crowson Cemetery in Wears Valley

Wears Valley is named after Samuel Wear (1753–1817), a Revolutionary War veteran who erected a fort near the entrance to the valley in what is now Pigeon Forge.

Aaron Crowson arrived in Wears Valley from North Carolina in 1792 along with his friend, Peter Percefield. This was during a period of elevated strife between the Cherokee and the fast-encroaching Euro-American settlers. Wear's Fort was attacked in 1793, with Wear leading a punitive march against the Cherokee village of Tallassee shortly thereafter. In May 1794, Percefield was killed in a Cherokee attack. Crowson rode to Wear's Fort to get help, but the Cherokee had fled by the time he returned. Several settlers marched onward to Great Tellico to the west, where they killed four Cherokee while they slept. Percefield was buried on a hill in the eastern half of Wear Cove, in what is now Crowson Cemetery. Later that year, Crowson received a land grant for this plot of land.

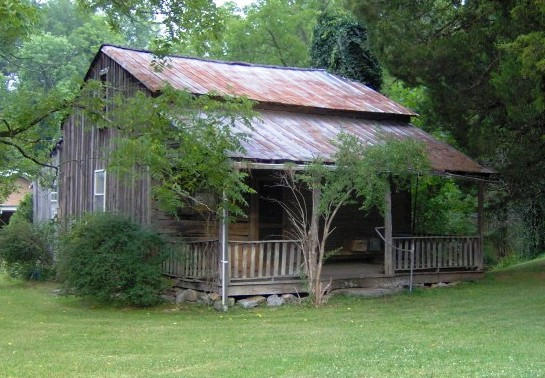
The Peter Brickey House, constructed ca. 1808

Along with Crowson, other early settlers in Wears Valley included a Revolutionary War veteran named William Headrick (1744–1839), who arrived in 1821, and John Ogle (1788–1841), a War of 1812 veteran and son of the first settlers in Gatlinburg. Another War of 1812 veteran, Peter Brickey (1769–1856), arrived in 1808. Brickey operated a large farm and distillery in the valley until his death in 1856. The log house he built shortly after his arrival still stands in Smith Hollow (between Wears Valley and Townsend) and is listed on the National Register of Historic Places.

Like many other farms in Wears Valley, the Brickey farm was ravaged by the U.S. Civil War. Isaac Trotter, who operated the iron forge at Pigeon Forge reported a Cherokee raid in Wear Cove in 1864. Earlier in the war, a Union army passed through the valley en route to dislodge the troops of Will Thomas who were entrenched in Gatlinburg. William C. Pickens, a resident of Wears Valley, was one of the so-called bridge-burners, a band of pro-Union guerillas who attempted to destroy several railroad bridges across East Tennessee in November 1861. Pickens led the failed attack on the Strawberry Plains bridge, and was badly wounded in the attack. Pro-Union newspaper editor William "Parson" Brownlow, wanted by Confederate authorities for complicity in the bridge burnings, hid out in Wears Valley at the home of Valentine Mattox in November 1861.

Sometime after the war, Alfred Line (1831–1897) established a farm at the base of Roundtop Mountain, near the southern half of Wear Cove. Line Spring, a clear mountain spring which flows down from the slopes of Roundtop, gave its name to a small recreational area that developed in this part of the cove. In the 1880s and 1890s, mineral-rich mountain springs were thought to have health-restoring qualities, and provided an early form of tourism for the mountain regions. In 1910, D.B. Lawson, the son of a circuit rider who had purchased the Line farm, constructed the Line Spring Hotel. The hotel boosted the valley's economy by providing a market for local farmers.

=== Religion ===
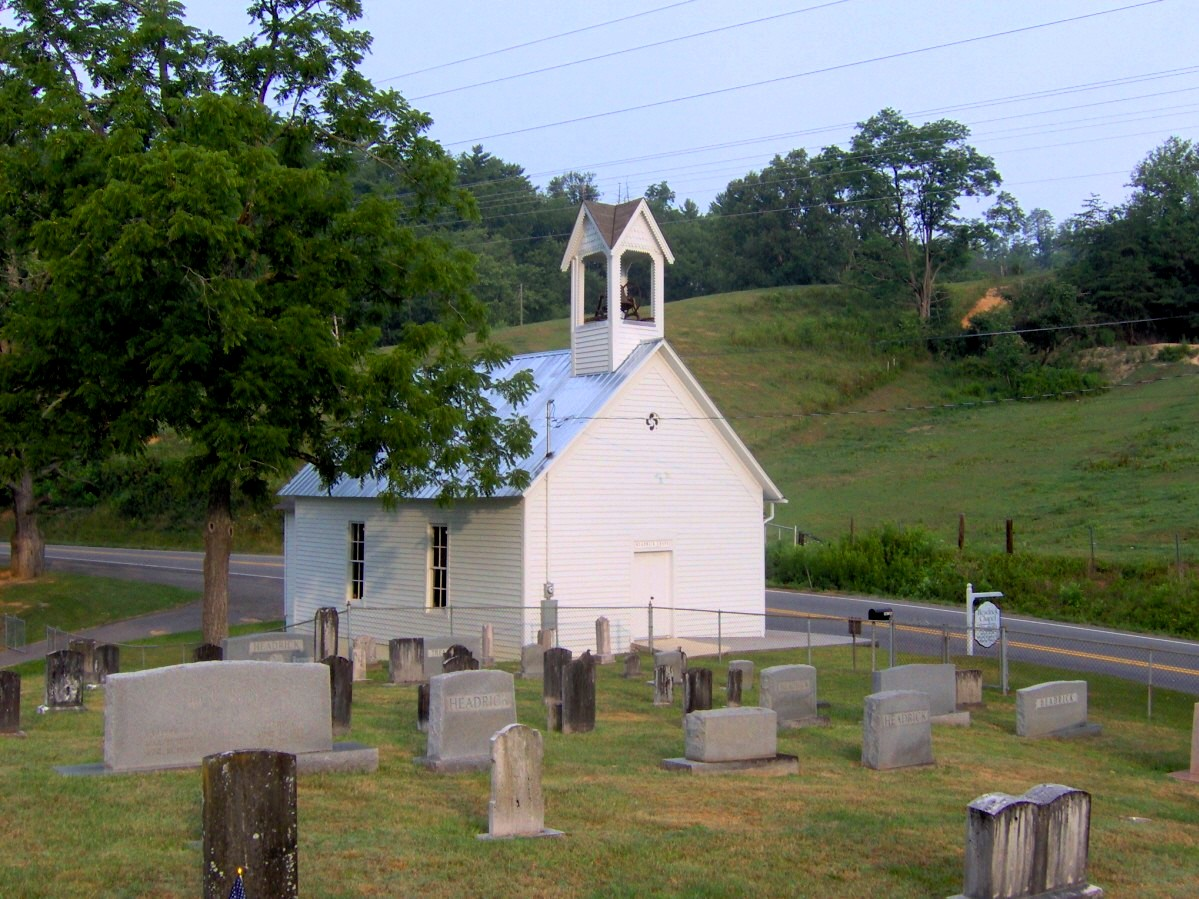
Headrick Chapel, constructed in 1902

Around 1800, Crowson and several other settlers erected a crude log church known as the Bethlehem Church. The church was used by both Methodists and Baptists throughout the 19th century, with Baptist services being conducted by an elected pastor and Methodist services being conducted by circuit riders. On occasion, both congregations would meet in a mini-revival known as a "union meeting." In 1886, both Baptists and Methodists constructed separate structures, although union meetings were still fairly common.

For most of the 19th century, funerals in Wears Valley were held at Headrick Cemetery, near the valley's western entrance. A large oak tree provided shelter for funeral-goers, although cold weather and rain often made apparent the need for a building in which to conduct indoor services. In 1902, according to local lore, the oak tree was destroyed by lightning, and in response, the residents erected Headrick Chapel on the cemetery's grounds. The chapel was shared by four Baptist and Methodist congregations, with funeral services having priority. The chapel's bell would ring once for every year of the deceased's life, a tradition still observed by the inhabitants of Wears Valley. In 2001, Headrick Chapel was placed on the National Register of Historic Places.

=== The national park ===
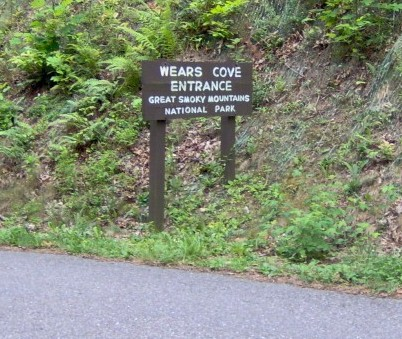
The Wear Cove entrance to the GSMNP on Lyon Spring Road

In 1934, the Great Smoky Mountains National Park was established. The park's border paralleled Wears Valley to the south, following the crest of Roundtop and Cove Mountain. With improvements to US-321 in the 1950s, tourist outlets began to trickle into Wears Valley. Cabin rentals and outdoor supply stores are among the more common tourism-oriented venues in the valley today.

In 2005, a group of developers led by Ron Ogle and Jerry Miller sought to build 400 houses on the slopes of Cove Mountain. This raised concern among many Wears Valley residents over the impact such development might have on Cove Mountain's scenic value. In 2007, Friends of Wears Valley— a group opposed to the development— unsuccessfully petitioned the Sevier County Regional Planning Commission to block the housing expansion on Cove Mountain. The group has posted "Save Our Mountains" signs throughout the valley, although the developers insist their plans will not harm the mountain's natural qualities.

=== Fire of 2016 ===
While the 2016 Great Smoky Mountains arson fires mainly affected the nearby towns of Pigeon Forge and Gatlinburg, many cabins did burn down in the northern part of the valley. After a downed power line ignited the dry foliage in Little Cove Gap, an isolated fire quickly spread, thereby consuming the surrounding structures towards the northern end of Wears Valley. Around 40 homes were destroyed and another 40 were damaged on Hideaway Mountain and Dogwood Farms Mountain.

=== Fire of 2022 ===
On March 30, 2022, a wildfire known as the Hatcher Mountain Road/Indigo Lane Fire broke out in Wears Valley. The fire swept across the Greater Pigeon Forge area in the span of 4 hours. The Sevier County emergency management issued evacuations of the surrounding area with an evacuation shelter being set up in central Pigeon Forge. Schools were closed the next day on March 31, 2022.

== Education ==
Wears Valley is the site of Wearwood Elementary School.
