= Tallassee (Cherokee town) =

Native American settlement

Coordinates: 35.5474°N 84.0598°W

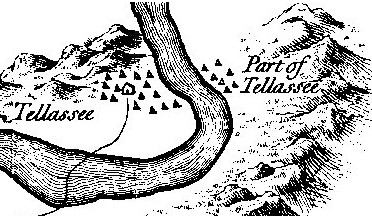
Tallassee on Henry Timberlake's 1762 "Draught of the Cherokee Country"

Tallassee (also "Talassee," "Talisi," "Tellassee," and various similar spellings) is a prehistoric and historic Native American site in present-day Blount and Monroe counties, Tennessee in the southeastern United States. Tallassee (Cherokee: ᏔᎵᏏ, romanized: Talisi) was the southernmost (and furthest upriver) of a string of Overhill Cherokee towns that existed along the lower Little Tennessee River on the west side of the Appalachian Mountains in the 18th century. Although Tallassee receives scant attention in primary historical accounts, it is one of the few Overhill towns to be shown on every major 18th-century map of the Little Tennessee Valley.

Salvage excavations conducted in the 1950s prior to construction of a dam on the Little Tennessee River also revealed much earlier indigenous habitation here, dating to the Woodland period (1000 B.C.–1000 A.D.). The site was occupied throughout much of the South Appalachian Mississippian culture period (900–1600 A.D.). A prehistoric substructure platform mound was found, which was likely constructed about 1000 AD in this period. Evidence of the historic Cherokee included more than two dozen burials, with grave goods showing established European trading, as well as refuse pits and remnants of a burned house.

The Tallassee site is now submerged by Chilhowee Lake, an impoundment of the Little Tennessee River created by the completion of Chilhowee Dam downriver in 1957. The shoreline above the site is occupied by the Calderwood Hydroelectric Development Area, which was established by the Aluminum Company of America in the 1920s. It was a base for the construction of Cheoah, Santeetlah, and Calderwood dams further upriver.

The modern hamlet of Tallassee was not established until the early 20th century. It is located 7 miles (11 km) downstream, near Chilhowee Dam.

== Geography ==
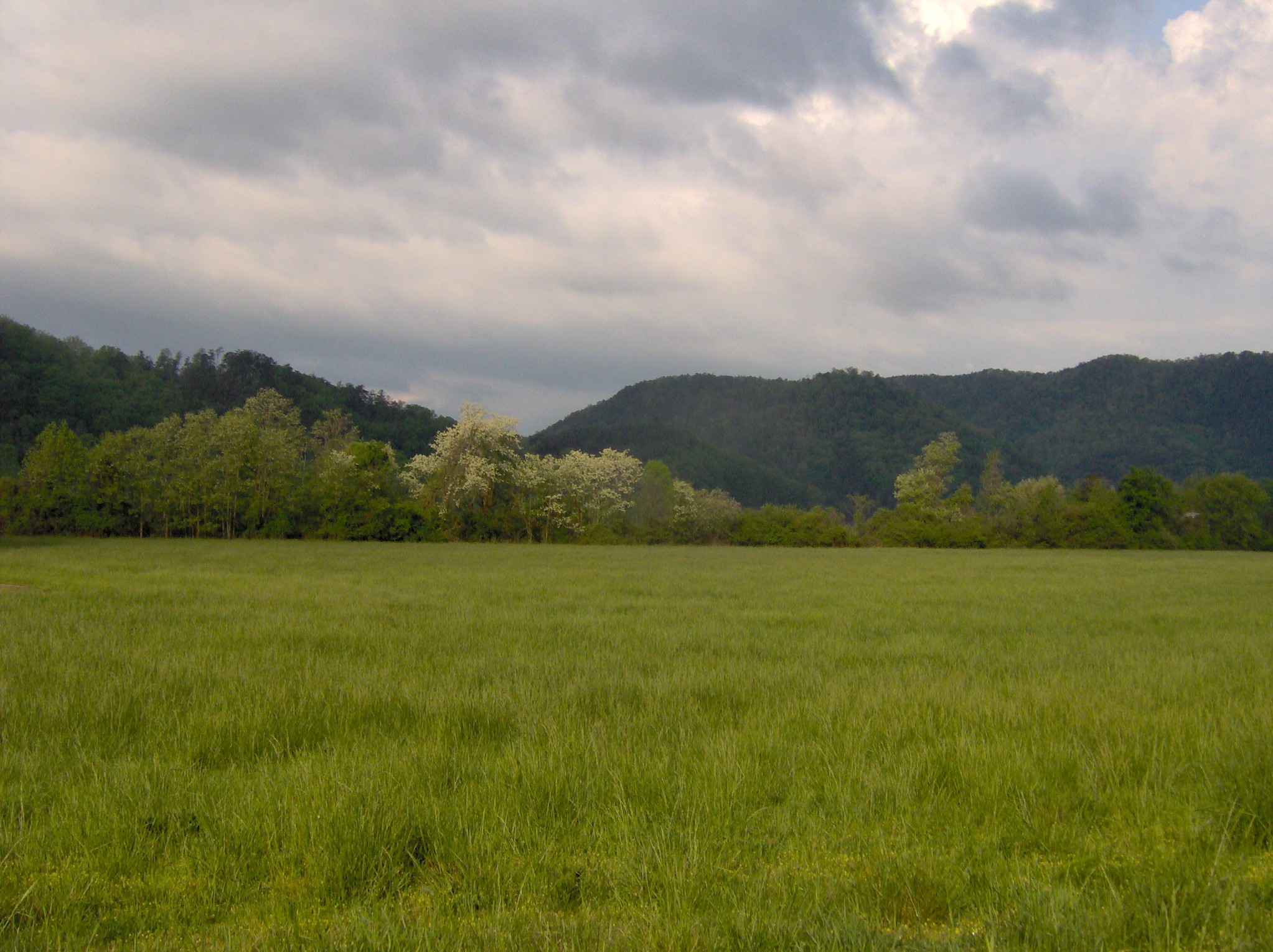
Looking west toward the ancient site of Tallassee (under the lake just beyond the treeline)

After winding from the mountains of Georgia into North Carolina, the Little Tennessee River passes through other mountains and crosses into Tennessee, where it flows for another 54 miles (87 km) before emptying into the Tennessee River near present-day Lenoir City. Chilhowee Dam, situated approximately 34 miles (55 km) above the mouth of the river, created a reservoir that spans the river for 10 miles (16 km) upriver, to the base of Calderwood Dam. The Tallassee site was located 41.5 miles (66.8 km) above the river's mouth, at the river's confluence with Tallassee Creek. According to 18th-century records, the town was situated on both banks of the river. Calderwood Dam is located just 2 miles (3.2 km) above the Tallassee site, opposite a U-shaped bend in the river.

The Tallassee site is surrounded by mountains on all sides. The Great Smoky Mountains rise to the north and east and the Unicoi Mountains rise to the south and west. The Little Tennessee provides the immediate boundary between the Great Smoky Mountains National Park and the Cherokee National Forest.

The Calderwood Hydroelectric Development Area— located on the shores above the ancient Tallassee site— is accessible just off U.S. Route 129 approximately 6 miles (9.7 km) south of the road's Foothills Parkway junction.

== History ==
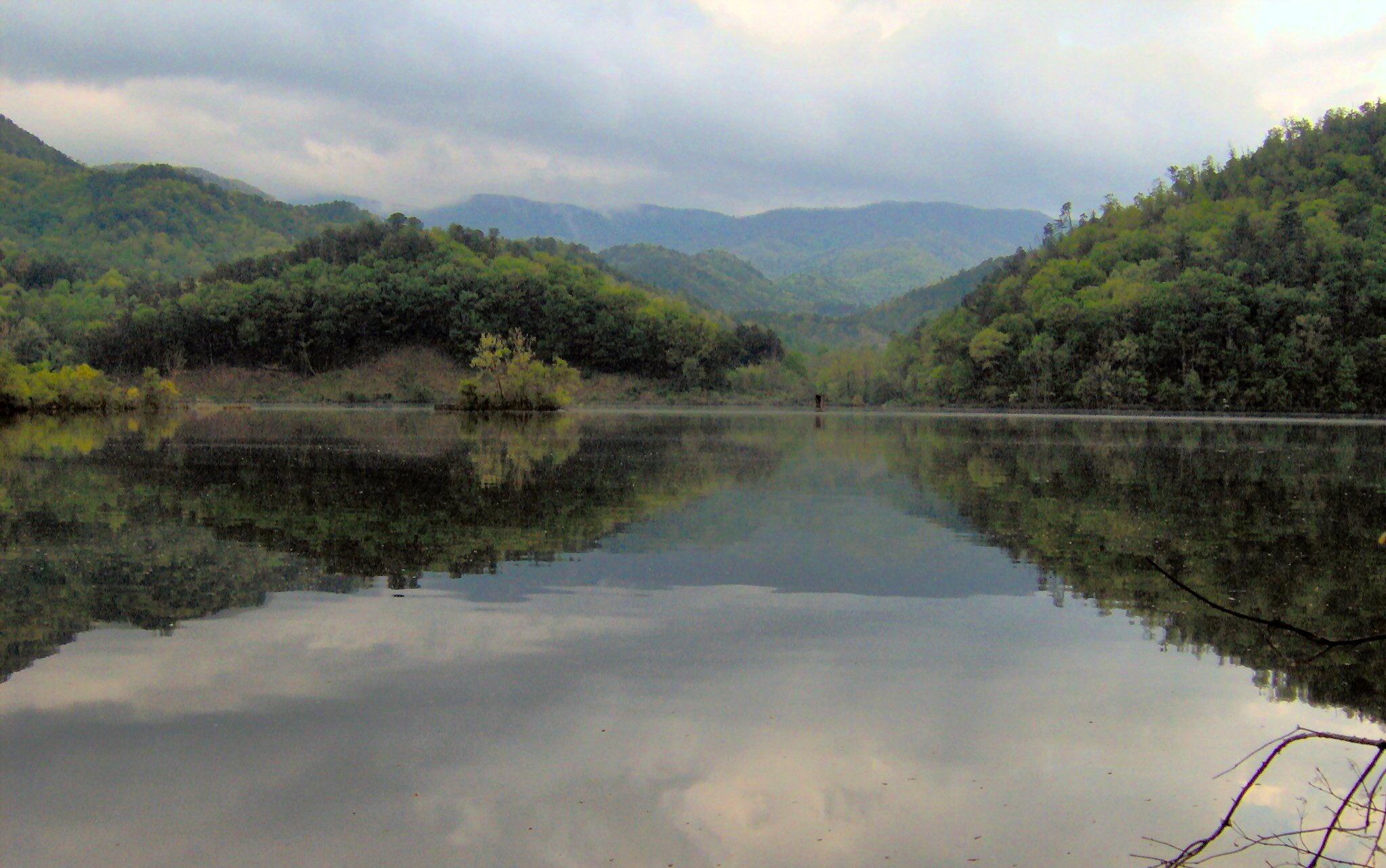
The now-submerged former site of Tallassee, looking south from a dock at Calderwood

Perhaps because of its remote location in the high mountains, Tallassee received little attention from explorers, traders, and diplomats throughout the 18th century. The village appears on George Hunter's 1730 map of the Cherokee country, along with Citico and Tanasi. The "head man" of Tallassee was one of several Overhill and Middle town chiefs who met with Colonel George Chicken at the Tanasi townhouse in 1725 to forge an alliance against their competitors the Creek. Tallassee again appears on Henry Popple's 1733 Map of the British Empire in North America, along with Citico and Tanasi. In 1751, South Carolina records list Tallassee as one of seven Overhill towns. The same seven are shown on John Mitchell's 1755 map of North America. Europeans recorded as Cherokee towns those settlements with a townhouse, their form of public architecture. It was a communal meeting place for people in the town, and the place where they received outsiders.

In 1761-62, Henry Timberlake visited the Overhill towns as a British envoy during a peace tour following the Anglo-Cherokee War. He made a map showing a townhouse and 22 dwellings (15 on the east bank and 7 on the west bank) at Tallassee. He also noted on the map that 47 warriors resided at Tallassee— it was the third-smallest contingent of towns he listed and mapped in the valley (Mialoquo and Tanasi had fewer warriors). Timberlake notes also that Tallassee's "governor" had recently died and had yet to be replaced.

The Cherokee–American wars, which raged in the late 18th century, resulted in the destruction of most of the Overhill towns and the valley's subsequent decline. In 1776, Colonel William Christian invaded the Overhill country and destroyed a number of towns but spared Tallassee. A militia detachment under Major Jonathan Tipton attempted to burn Tallassee in 1780 but abandoned the assault when the river proved impassable.

Finally in 1788, Tallassee was burned by forces commanded by John Sevier, largely in retaliation for what European-American settlers called the Nine Mile Creek massacre. The village was attacked again in 1795 by Colonel Alexander Kelley, and 8 villagers were killed. Tallassee was abandoned in 1819 after the Cherokee signed the Treaty of Calhoun, ceding the Little Tennessee Valley to the United States. For most of the 19th and early 20th centuries, Tallassee was the site of a river ford connecting the Calloway and Parson's turnpikes.

=== Modern hamlet of Tallassee ===
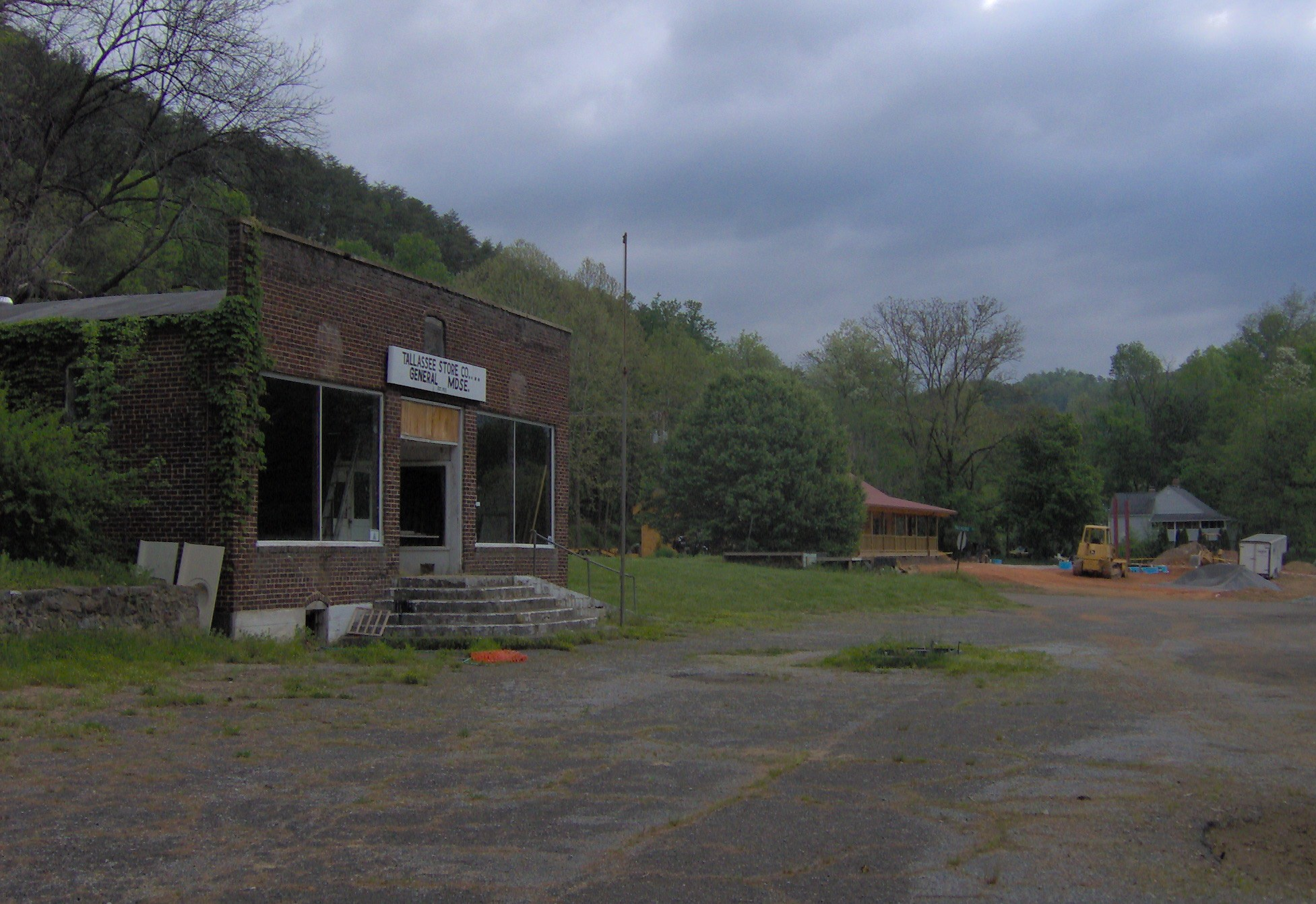
Modern Tallassee along US-129

In the early 20th century, a railroad station named Tallassee was set up approximately 7 miles (11 km) downstream from the ancient village, near the modern Chilhowee Dam. Around 1928, several investors attempted to establish a mountain resort at this station. Cabins were built and sold, but the project ultimately failed. A small community continues at this new Tallassee. The Tellico Reservoir Development Agency has installed a boat ramp for access to the river, across the street from the old general store.

== Archaeology ==
When Alcoa announced plans to build Chilhowee Dam in 1955, the Knoxville Chapter of the Tennessee Archaeological Society (under the guidance of Thomas Lewis and Madeline Kneburg of the University of Tennessee) began conducting salvage excavations at the Chilhowee and Tallassee sites, both of which were scheduled to be flooded by the reservoir. As surface investigations recovered few artifacts at Chilhowee, however, the focus was shifted to Tallassee.

Materials gathered from the Tallassee excavations revealed sporadic habitation dating to as early as the Woodland period (1000 B.C.–1000 A.D.) and occurring throughout the South Appalachian Mississippian culture period (900–1600 A.D.). A prehistoric substructure platform mound was located at the site, on the east bank of the river. Excavators also uncovered 145 burials at Tallassee: 27 of which were classified as historic Cherokee. Grave goods accompanying the Cherokee burials included glass trading beads, iron tools, and brass implements, all evidence of European trading; as well as copper arrowheads, and a jaw harp. Excavators also uncovered 18 refuse pits, remnants of a house that had been burned, and the foundations of an early 19th-century cabin.
