= North Carolina General Assembly of 1899–1900 =

General assembly election

94th North Carolina General Assembly (1899–1900)
| ← | 1897 | 1901 | → |
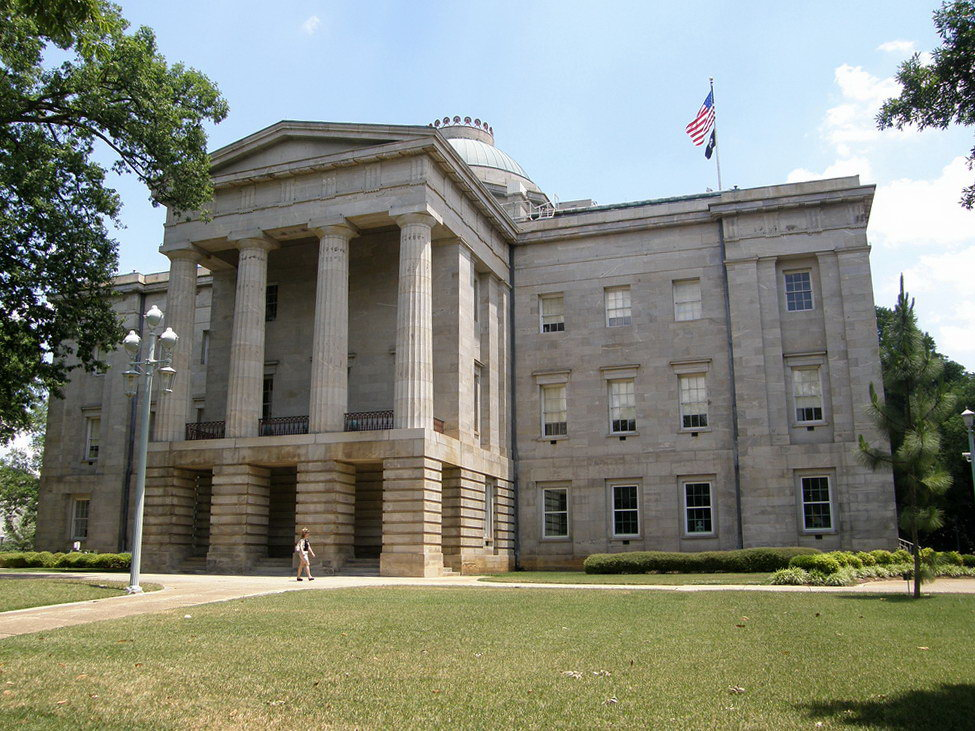
- North Carolina State Capitol

Overview
- Legislative body: North Carolina General Assembly
- Jurisdiction: North Carolina, United States
- Meeting place: North Carolina State Capitol
- Term: 1899-1900

North Carolina Senate
- Members: 49 Senators
- President of the Senate: Charles A. Reynolds (Rep)
- President pro tempore: R. L. Smith (Dem); F. A. Whitaker (Dem)
- Party control: Democratic Party

North Carolina House of Representatives
- Members: 118 Representatives
- Speaker of the House: Henry G. Connor
- Party control: Democratic Party

Members of the North Carolina General Assembly of 1899–1900 were elected in November 1898. The election saw the Democratic Party return to majority status in both houses, replacing the fusion of Republicans and Populists. After this election, Democrats dominated state politics for the next seventy-plus years, in part due to the 1899–1900 legislature disfranchising African-Americans. The election followed the 1898 Wilmington massacre.

== House of Representatives ==
=== House leadership ===
North Carolina House officers
| Position | Name | Party |
|---|---|---|
| Speaker | Henry G. Connor | Democratic |

=== House members ===
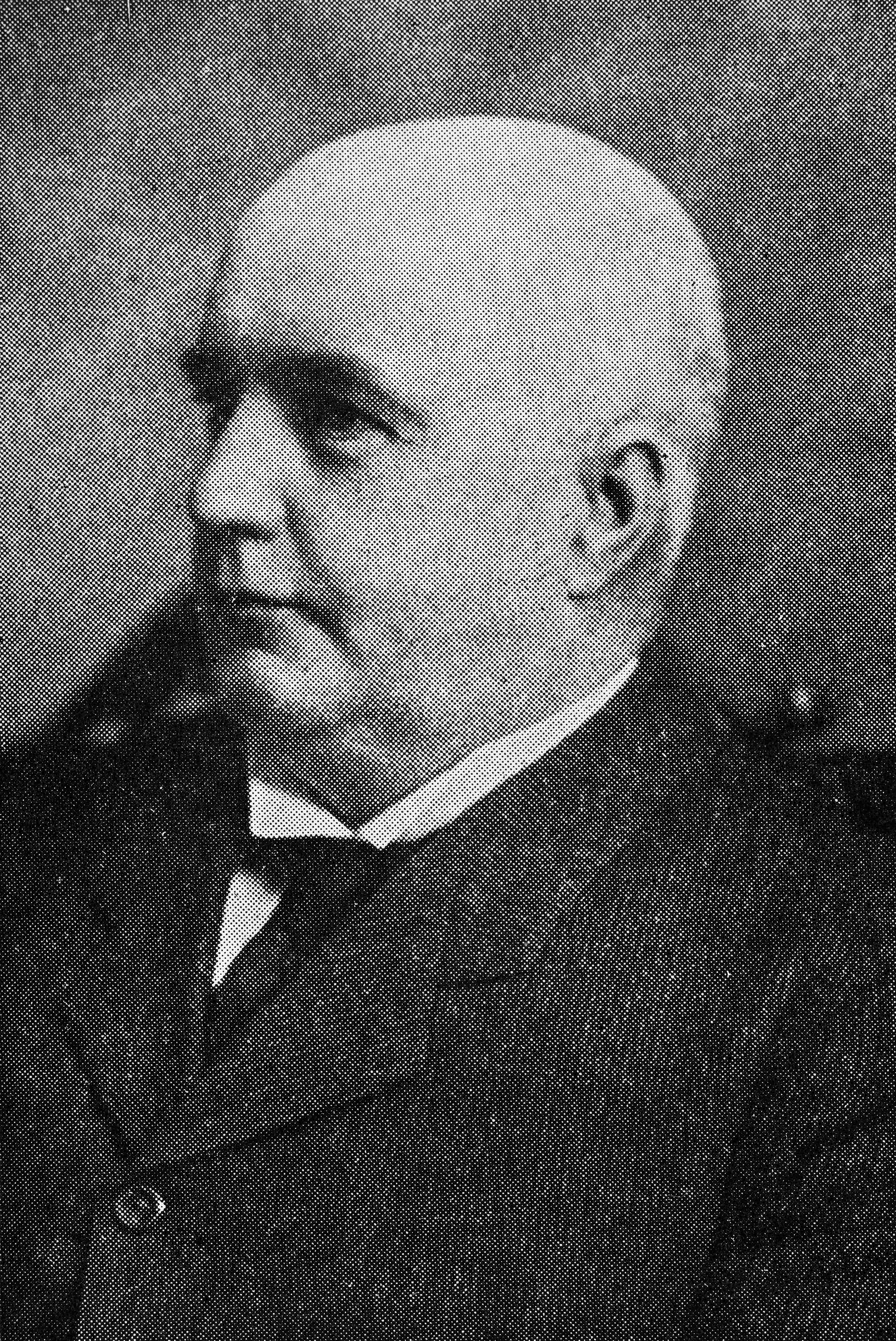
Rep. Francis D. Winston

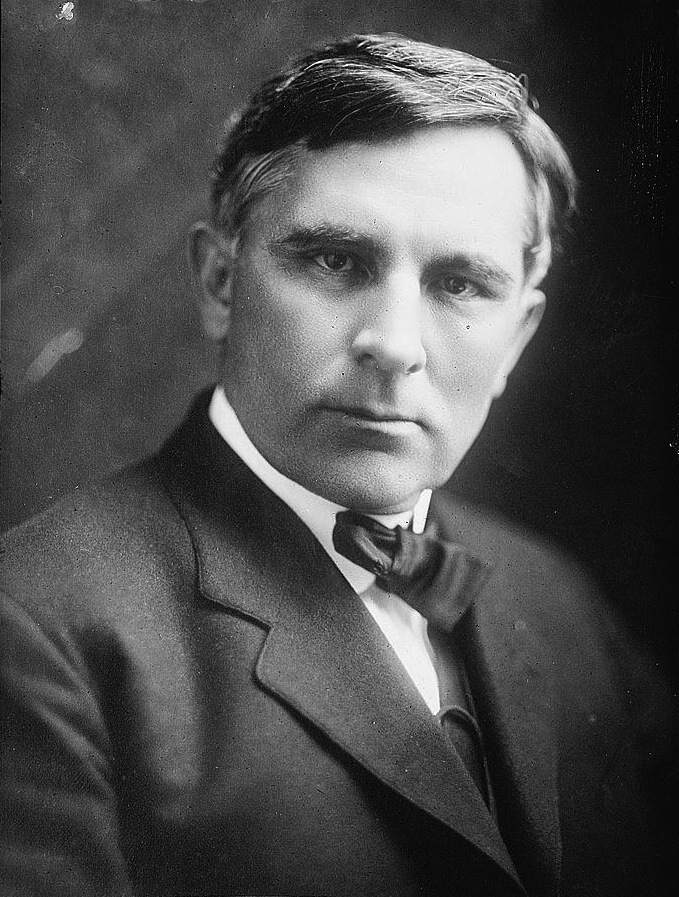
Rep. Locke Craig

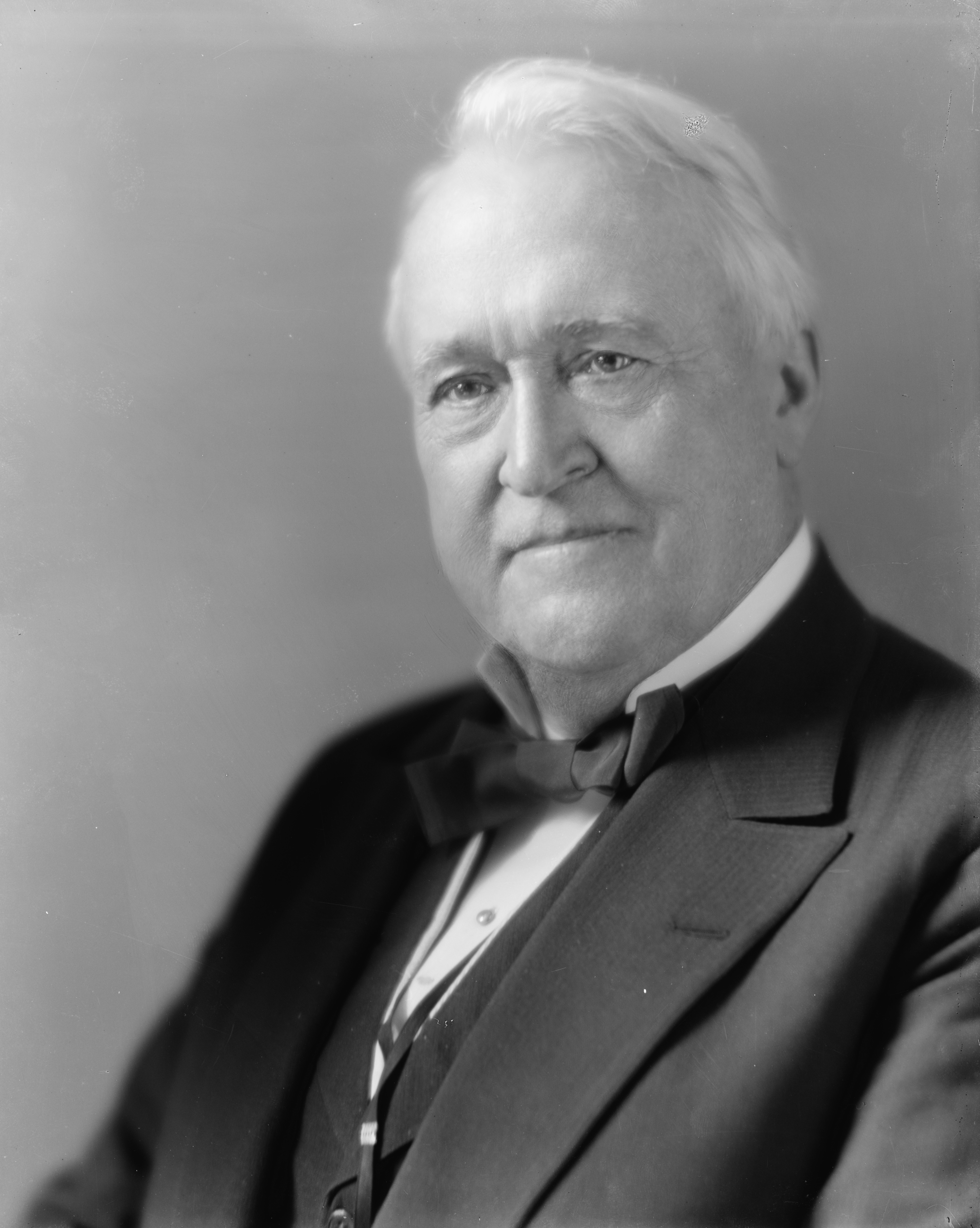
Rep. Lee Slater Overman

The 118 House of Representative members and their party affiliation are listed below:

- Alamance: W. H. Carroll (Dem)
- Alexander: Atwell C. McIntosh (Dem)
- Alleghany: James M. Gambill (Dem)
- Anson: James A. Leak (Dem)
- Ashe: B. E. Reeves (Dem)
- Beaufort: B. B. Nicholson (Dem)
- Bertie: Francis D. Winston (Dem)
- Bladen: George H. Currie (Dem)
- Brunswick: D. B. McNeill (Dem)
- Buncombe: Locke Craig (Dem)
- Buncombe: J. C. Curtis (Dem)
- Burke: Julius H. Hoffman (Dem)
- Cabarrus: Luther T. Hartsell (Dem)
- Caldwell: Samuel L. Patterson (Dem)
- Camden: John K. Abbott (Dem)
- Carteret: John B. Russell (Dem)
- Caswell: Charles J. Yarborough (Rep)
- Catawba: A. C. Boggs (Dem)
- Chatham: Los L. Wrenn (Rep)
- Chatham: J. A. Giles (Rep)
- Cherokee: W. E. Manney (Dem)
- Chowan: W. Dorsey Welch (Dem)
- Clay: George M. Fleming (Dem)
- Cleveland: Clyde R. Hoey (Dem)
- Columbus: D. C. Allen (Dem)
- Craven: Isaac H. Smith (Rep)
- Cumberland: D. J. Ray (Dem)
- Cumberland: H. McD. Robinson (Dem)
- Curritick: Samuel M. Beasley (Dem)
- Dare: Charles T. Williams (Dem)
- Davidson: Charles M. Thompson (Dem)
- Davie: Gaston L. White (Rep)
- Duplin: James O. Carr (Dem)
- Durham: Howard A. Foushee (Dem)
- Edgecombe: Henry A. Gilliam (Dem)
- Forsyth: J. K. P. Carter (Rep)
- Forsyth: William A. Lowery (Rep)
- Franklin: P. A. Davis (Dem)
- Gaston: L. H. J. Hauser (Dem)
- Gates: John M. Trotman (Dem)
- Graham: O. P. Williams (Rep)
- Granville: C. W. Bryan (Dem)
- Granville: A. A. Lyon (Dem)
- Greene: John E. W. Sugg (Dem)
- Guilford: John C. Kennett (Dem)
- Guilford: John C. Bunch (Dem)
- Halifax: H. S. Harrison (Dem)
- Halifax: W. P. White (Dem)
- Harnett: Dan Hugh McLean (Dem)
- Haywood: Joseph S. Davis (Dem)
- Henderson: M. S. Justus (Rep)
- Hertford: Isaac F. Snipes (Rep)
- Hyde: Claude W. Davis (Dem)
- Iredell: John B. Holman (Dem)
- Iredell: Thomas J. Williams (Dem)
- Jackson: Walter E. Moore (Dem)
- Johnston: J. F. Brown (Dem)
- Johnston: D. G. Johnson (Dem)
- Jones: G. G. Noble (Dem)
- Lenoir: W. W. Carraway (Dem)
- Lincoln: John F. Rheinhart (Dem)
- McDowell: Edward J. Justice (Dem)
- Macon: J. Frank Ray (Dem)
- Madison: A. B. Bryant (Rep)
- Martin: Harry W. Stubbs (Dem)
- Mecklenburg: Heriot Clarkson (Dem)
- Mecklenburg: J. E. Henderson (Dem)
- Mecklenburg: R. M. Ransom (Dem)
- Mitchell: J. R. Pritchard (Rep)
- Montgomery: W. A. Cochran (Dem)
- Moore: John L. Currie (Dem)
- Nash: Cicero T. Ellen (Dem)
- New Hanover: George Rountree (Dem)
- New Hanover: Martin S. Willard (Dem)
- Northampton: W. C. Coates (Rep)
- Onslow: Frank Thompson (Dem)
- Orange: Samuel M. Gattis (Dem)
- Pamlico: George Dees (Dem)
- Pasquotank: J. B. Leigh (Dem)
- Pender: Gibson James (Dem)
- Perquimans: F. H. Nicholson (Rep)
- Person: Charles A. Whitfield (Dem)
- Pitt: W. J. Nichols (Dem)
- Pitt: T. H. Barnhill (Dem)
- Polk: J. W. McFarland (Rep)
- Randolph: T. J. Redding (Dem)
- Randolph: J. M. Burrow (Rep)
- Richmond: Henry Clay Wall (Dem)
- Robeson: Gilbert B. Patterson (Dem)
- Robeson: James S. Oliver (Dem)
- Rockingham: J. H. Lane (Dem)
- Rockingham: J. R. Garrett (Dem)
- Rowan: Lee Slater Overman (Dem)
- Rowan: D. R. Julian (Dem)
- Rutherford: J. F. Alexander (Dem)
- Sampson: Robert M. Crumpler (Pop)
- Sampson: Cicero H. Johnson (Pop)
- Stanly: J. M. Brown (Dem)
- Stokes: Riley J. Petree (Rep)
- Surry: William W. Hampton (Rep)
- Swain: R. L. Leatherwood (Dem)
- Transylvania: George W. Wilson (Dem)
- Tyrrell: William Maitland (Dem)
- Union: R. L. Stevens (Dem)
- Vance: James Youman Eaton (Rep)
- Wake: John D. Boushall (Dem)
- Wake: Gaston Powell (Dem)
- Wake: W. H. Holland (Dem)
- Warren: J. H. Wright (Rep)
- Washington: T. L. Tarkenton (Pop)
- Watauga: W. B. Council, Jr. (Dem)
- Wayne: William R. Allen (Dem)
- Wayne: J. M. Wood (Dem)
- Wilkes: E. B. Hendren (Rep)
- Wilkes: W. A. Tharpe (Rep) who lived in Byrd, North Carolina
- Wilson: Henry G. Connor (Dem)
- Yadkin: H. S. Williams (Rep)
- Yancey: W. M. Austin (Dem)

== Senate ==
=== Senate leadership ===
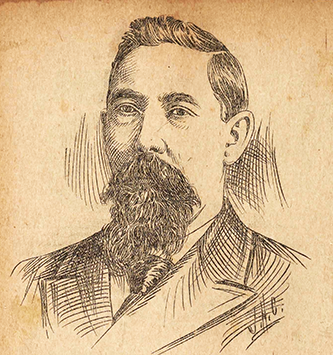
Lieutenant Governor Charles A. Reynolds

North Carolina Senate officers
| Position | Name | Party |
|---|---|---|
| President Pro Tem | R. L. Smith; F. A. Whitaker | Democratic |

=== Senate members ===
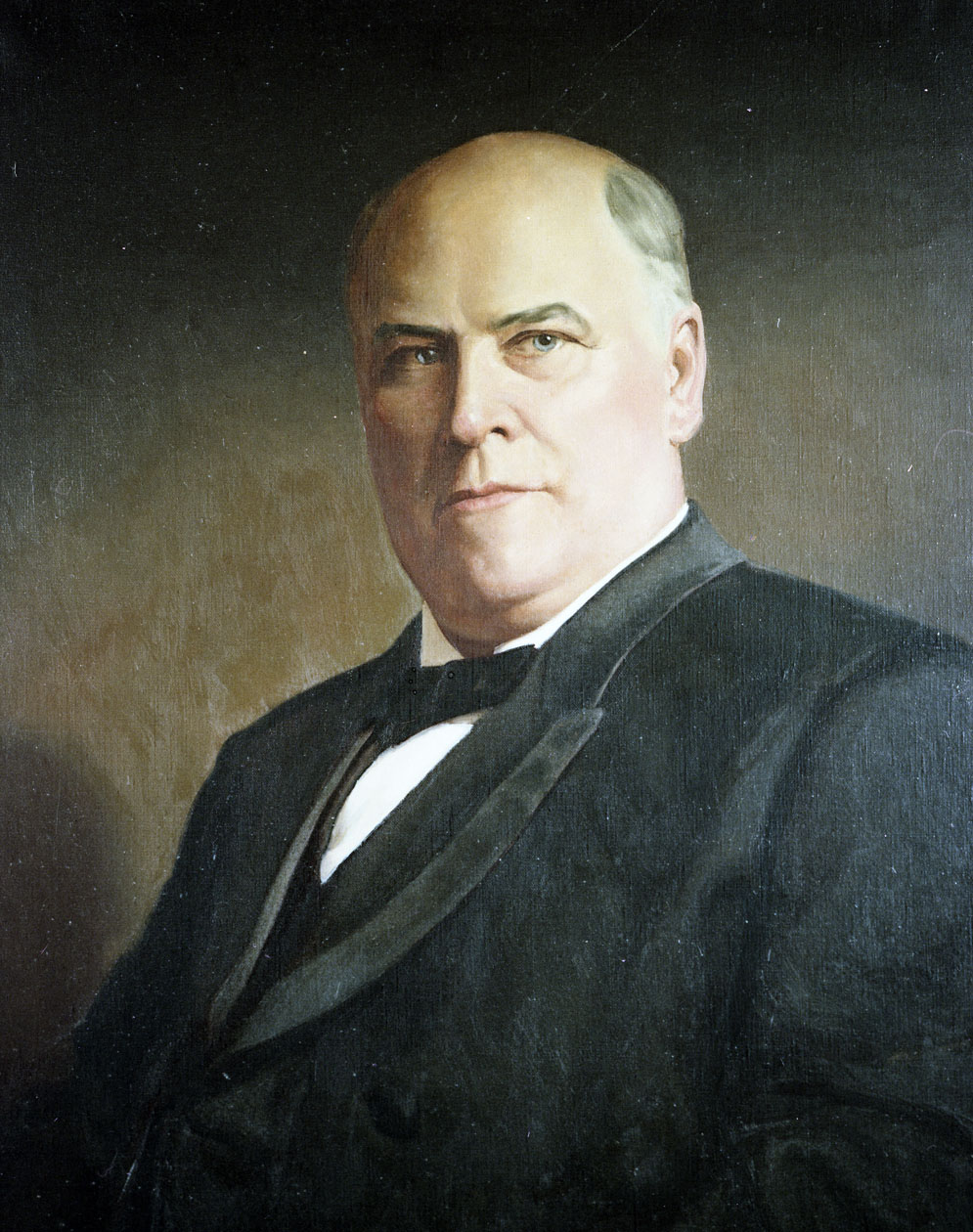
Sen. Robert Broadnax Glenn

Senators and their home county are listed below:

- District 1: George Cowper of Hertford; Thomas Gregory Skinner of Perquimans
- District 2: I. W. Miller of Pamlico; H. S. Ward of Washington
- District 3: W. E. Harris of Northampton
- District 4: Edward L. Travis of Halifax
- District 5: R. H. Speight of Edgecombe
- District 6: F. G. James of Pitt
- District 7: T. S. Collie Nash; R. A. P. Cooley of Nash
- District 8: James A. Bryan of Craven; John Q. Jackson of Lenoir
- District 9: Frank A. Daniels of Wayne; Isham F. Hill of Duplin
- District 10: W. J. Davis of Brunswick
- District 11: Thomas O. Fuller of Warren
- District 12: F. A. Whitaker of Wake (Dem)
- District 13: J. A. T. Jones of Johnston
- District 14: J. W. S. Robinson of Sampson; Frank P. Jones of Harnett
- District 15: Joseph A. Brown of Columbus; Stephen McIntyre of Robeson
- District 16: W. L. Williams of Cumberland
- District 17: Archibald A. Hicks of Granville
- District 18: Thomas M. Cheek of Orange; J. M. Satterfield of Caswell
- District 19: J. A. Goodwin of Chatham
- District 20: William Lindsay of Rockingham
- District 21: John N. Wilson of Guilford
- District 22: J. C. Black of Moore
- District 23: Thomas J. Jerome of Union; Charles Stanback of Montgomery
- District 24: R. L. Smith of Stanly (Dem)
- District 25: Frank I. Osborne of Mecklenburg
- District 26: Robert Broadnax Glenn of Forsyth (Dem); John C. Thomas of Davidson
- District 27: James A. Butler of Iredell; Frank C. Hairston of Davie
- District 28: J. C. Newsom of Stokes
- District 29: H. T. Campbell of Alexander
- District 30: William C. Fields of Ashe
- District 31: W. L. Lambert of Mitchell; G. G. Eaves of McDowell
- District 32: M. H. Justice of Rutherford; Oscar F. Mason of Gaston
- District 33: William J. Cocke of Buncombe; Thomas J. Murray of Madison
- District 34: J. A. Franks of Swain
- District 35: Joel L. Crisp of Graham

== Proceedings ==
The General Assembly convened on January 4, 1899. The House elected Henry G. Connor as its speaker. Charles A. Reynolds presided over the Senate.

== See also ==
- North Carolina General Assembly
- List of North Carolina state legislatures

== Works cited ==
- Edmonds, Helen G. (2013). The Negro and Fusion Politics in North Carolina, 1894-1901 (revised ed.). Chapel Hill: The University of North Carolina Press. ISBN 9781469610955.
