= Santeetlah =

Santeetlah may refer to:

- Lake Santeetlah, a body of water in North Carolina, U.S.
- Lake Santeetlah, North Carolina, U.S., a town
- Santeetlah dam, a reservoir and dam development project in North Carolina, U.S.
