= Snowbird Mountain Lodge =

Historic lodge in North Carolina, United States

- U.S. National Register of Historic Places
- U.S. Historic district
- Location within North Carolina Location within the United States
- Location: 275 Santeetlah Rd., near Robbinsville, North Carolina
- Coordinates: 35°26′31″N 83°56′19″W
- Area: 97 acres (39 ha)
- Built: 1941
- Architect: Greene, Ronald; Moore, Bill
- Architectural style: Bungalow/craftsman
- NRHP reference No.: 93000885
- Added to NRHP: September 2, 1993

The Snowbird Mountain Lodge is an historic hotel property in rural Graham County, North Carolina. It is located on the Cherohala Skyway, about 11 miles (18 km) west of Robbinsville. The main lodge was designed by Asheville architect Ronald Greene, and was built in 1940–1941 for Arthur and Edwin Wolfe; it was one of the last of a series of architecturally significant mountain lodges built in the region in the first half of the 20th century. The property features commanding views of the surrounding Nantahala National Forest and Lake Santeetlah.

The lodge was listed on the National Register of Historic Places in 1993.

== See also ==
- National Register of Historic Places listings in Graham County, North Carolina
