= Cheoah =

Cheoah may refer to:

- Cheoah Dam, a hydroelectric complex on the Little Tennessee River in North Carolina
- Cheoah River, tributary of the Little Tennessee River in North Carolina
- Cheoah, community in Graham County, North Carolina
