= Lake Santeetlah, North Carolina =

- Town
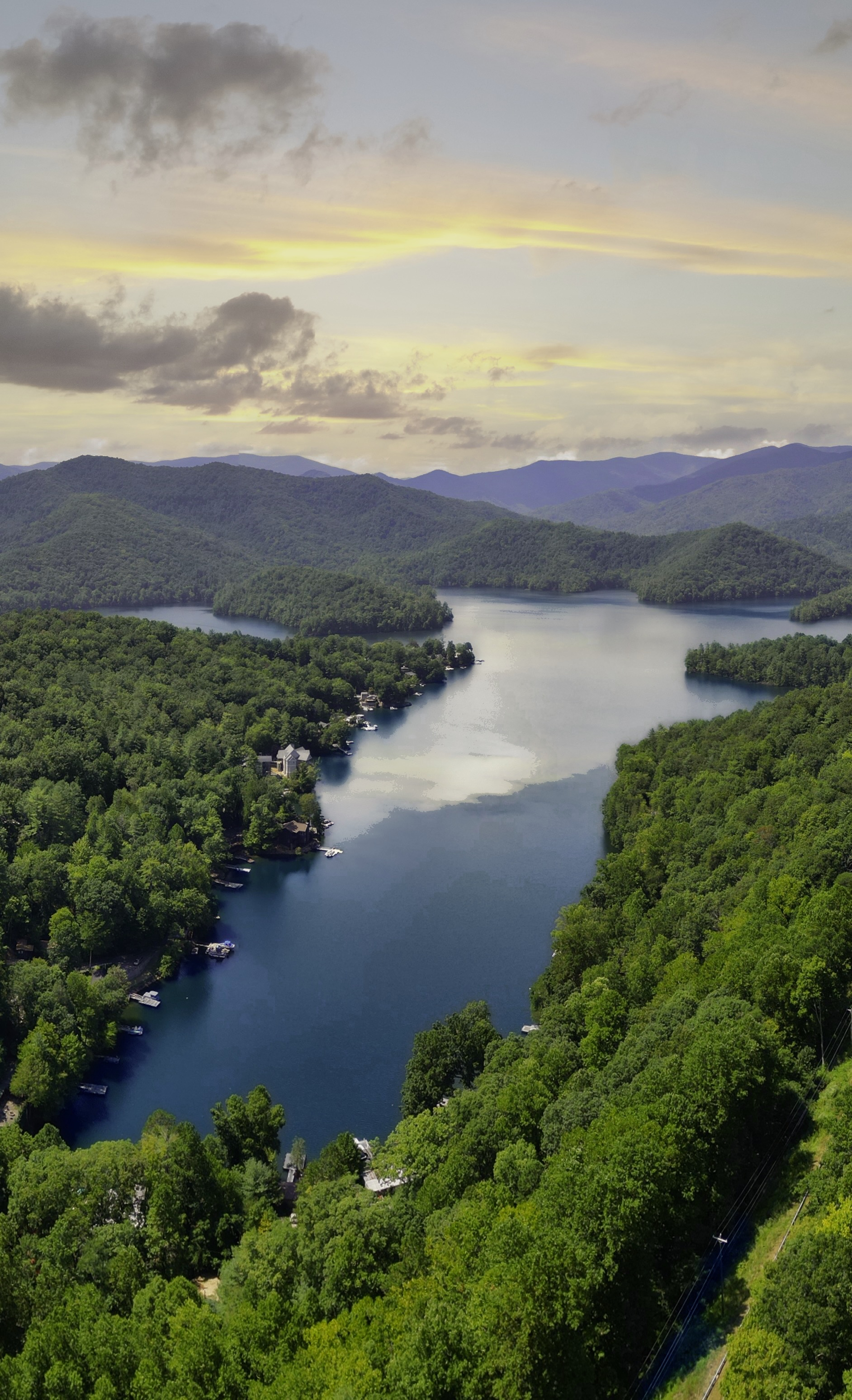

- Location within North Carolina Location within the United States
- Coordinates: 35°21′49″N 83°51′59″W
- Country: United States
- State: North Carolina
- County: Graham

Area
  - Total: 0.19 sq mi (0.50 km^{2})
  - Land: 0.19 sq mi (0.50 km^{2})
  - Water: 0 sq mi (0.00 km^{2})
- Elevation: 2,159 ft (658 m)

Population (2020)
  - Total: 38
  - Density: 195.6/sq mi (75.52/km^{2})
- Time zone: UTC-5 (Eastern (EST))
  - Summer (DST): UTC-4 (EDT)
- ZIP code: 28771
- Area code: 828
- FIPS code: 37-36514
- GNIS feature ID: 2352729
- Website: townoflakesanteetlah.org

Lake Santeetlah is a town in Graham County, North Carolina, United States, 6 miles (10 km) northwest of Robbinsville on a peninsula surrounded by Lake Santeetlah—which in turn is largely surrounded by Nantahala National Forest. The town has more than two hundred residences, many of them second homes owned by permanent residents of Florida and Georgia. The town was organized in 1989 as "Santeetlah"; in 1999, it changed its name to "Lake Santeetlah". As of the 2020 census, Lake Santeetlah had a population of 38.

== Geography ==
The town of Lake Santeetlah is located in central Graham County on a peninsula on the northern side of Lake Santeetlah, a reservoir on the Cheoah River, a northward-flowing tributary of the Little Tennessee River. U.S. Route 129 passes just north of the town, leading southeast 6 miles (10 km) to Robbinsville, the county seat, and northwest 9 miles (14 km) to Tapoco at the Little Tennessee River.

According to the United States Census Bureau, the town of Lake Santeetlah has a total area of 0.19 square miles (0.5 km^{2}), all land.

== History ==
Because of its mountainous terrain, Graham County was one of the last sections of the eastern United States to be settled by Europeans. Robbinsville was not incorporated until 1893, and it had only 200 residents in 1915. The area known as "Santeetlah" along the Cheoah River was sparsely settled, and in any case, the river valley was flooded after Santeetlah Dam was completed in 1928. In 1939, the U.S. Forest Service purchased from Carolina Aluminum Company the land now occupied by the town of Lake Santeetlah.

The father of Lake Santeetlah was Kenneth S. Keyes, Sr. (1896–1995), a native of Detroit, who became an extremely successful real estate dealer in Miami, heading over fifty corporations that operated hotels, office buildings and other realty enterprises in Florida, New York, and Canada. In 1957 he served as president of the National Association of Realtors. Keyes, an evangelical Christian, was also finance chairman of the National Association of Evangelicals and a founder of the Presbyterian Church in America.

In 1947, Keyes exchanged with the Forest Service some land he held for the area that is now the town of Lake Santeetlah. For undetermined reasons he called the property "Thunderbird Estates". Apparently Keyes hoped to build a large hotel complex in the area of the community now known as Chalet Village, and that area was graded in preparation for building. Nevertheless, although he hired a Miami architectural firm to draw the plans, Keyes never built, and in 1958, he sold the undeveloped property to another Florida land developer, who transferred it again in 1961.

In the early 1960s, a new corporation, Smoky Mountain Resorts, built a lodge and some cabins, and the first landowners began to build on the north shore of the peninsula. The lodge, with its two faux totem poles, became "the heartbeat of Thunderbird Mountain Resort" with activities that included square dancing, bingo, movies, and church services, as well as a place "to gather together when the mail was delivered." Although roads were graded and paved and a water system installed, "Thunderbird Mountain Club Resort", as the development was first called, was "always short of capital." In 1971, Smoky Mountain Resorts sold its interest to W. Bennett Collette, "a dabbler in buying financially distressed properties."

Collette transferred the properties around among his various companies, and by 1973, he had clearly communicated to the residents that he was not interested in operating the water system. The Thunderbird Homeowners Association—later, Thunderbird Property Owners Association—which had been formed in 1969 and incorporated in 1971, began to investigate the possibility of taking over the water system itself, not without disharmony among the members. In 1979, the Insurance Commissioner of Indiana confiscated the assets of Collette's now-defunct Pilgrim Life Insurance Company, and the State of Indiana briefly owned Thunderbird Mountain before selling it to Executive National Life Insurance in 1981.

Relations between Executive National Life Insurance and the Thunderbird property owners "were at best rocky." The insurance company did not repair the water system or provide other services specified by the restrictive covenants, and many property owners stopped paying their fees. The water system grew so unreliable that some property owners dug their own wells. A lawsuit by the insurance company was dismissed by the court, and the company became more amenable to the formation of an incorporated town.

On April 13, 1989, Thunderbird Mountain became the Town of Santeetlah, and in 1991, Executive National transferred the roads and the water system to the town. Through state grants and assessments on the properties (including those of the insurance company), a new water system was created and the roads were repaved. The same year a volunteer fire department and community center were constructed. Ten years later, in 1998, a town hall was dedicated on the Fourth of July.

In 1979, the State of North Carolina had prohibited any new connections to the antiquated water system. Although property sales and home construction did not completely cease—a builder could drill his own well—the completion of the new water system in 1995 occurred simultaneously with a new round of construction. Homes built in the 1990s and first decade of the new century tended to be much grander than the simple cottages of the 1960s. Before being demolished, the lodge, which had operated only sporadically during the preceding decades, was recycled into the sales office of an upscale lake-front development called "Santeetlah Lakeside"; and million-dollar property transfers occurred for the first time.

== Demographics ==
Historical population
Census	Pop.	Note	%±
1990	47		—
2000	67		42.6%
2010	45		−32.8%
2020	38		−15.6%
U.S. Decennial Census

As of the census of 2000, there were 67 people, 38 households, and 25 families residing in the town. The population density was 332.4 inhabitants per square mile (128.3/km^{2}). There were 172 housing units at an average density of 853.3 per square mile (329.5/km^{2}). The racial makeup of the town was 94.03% White, 1.49% African American and 4.48% Native American. Hispanic or Latino of any race were 1.49% of the population.

There were 38 households, out of which 5.3% had children under the age of 18 living with them, 65.8% were married couples living together, and 31.6% were non-families. 31.6% of all households were made up of individuals, and 13.2% had someone living alone who was 65 years of age or older. The average household size was 1.76 and the average family size was 2.12.

In the town, the population was spread out, with 4.5% under the age of 18, 10.4% from 25 to 44, 41.8% from 45 to 64, and 43.3% who were 65 years of age or older. The median age was 61 years. For every 100 females, there were 97.1 males. For every 100 females age 18 and over, there were 100.0 males.

The median income for a household in the town was $70,417, and the median income for a family was $83,989. Males had a median income of $50,625 versus $0 for females. The per capita income for the town was $53,491. There were no families and 13.2% of the population living below the poverty line, including no under eighteens and 9.1% of those over 64.

== Recreational attractions ==
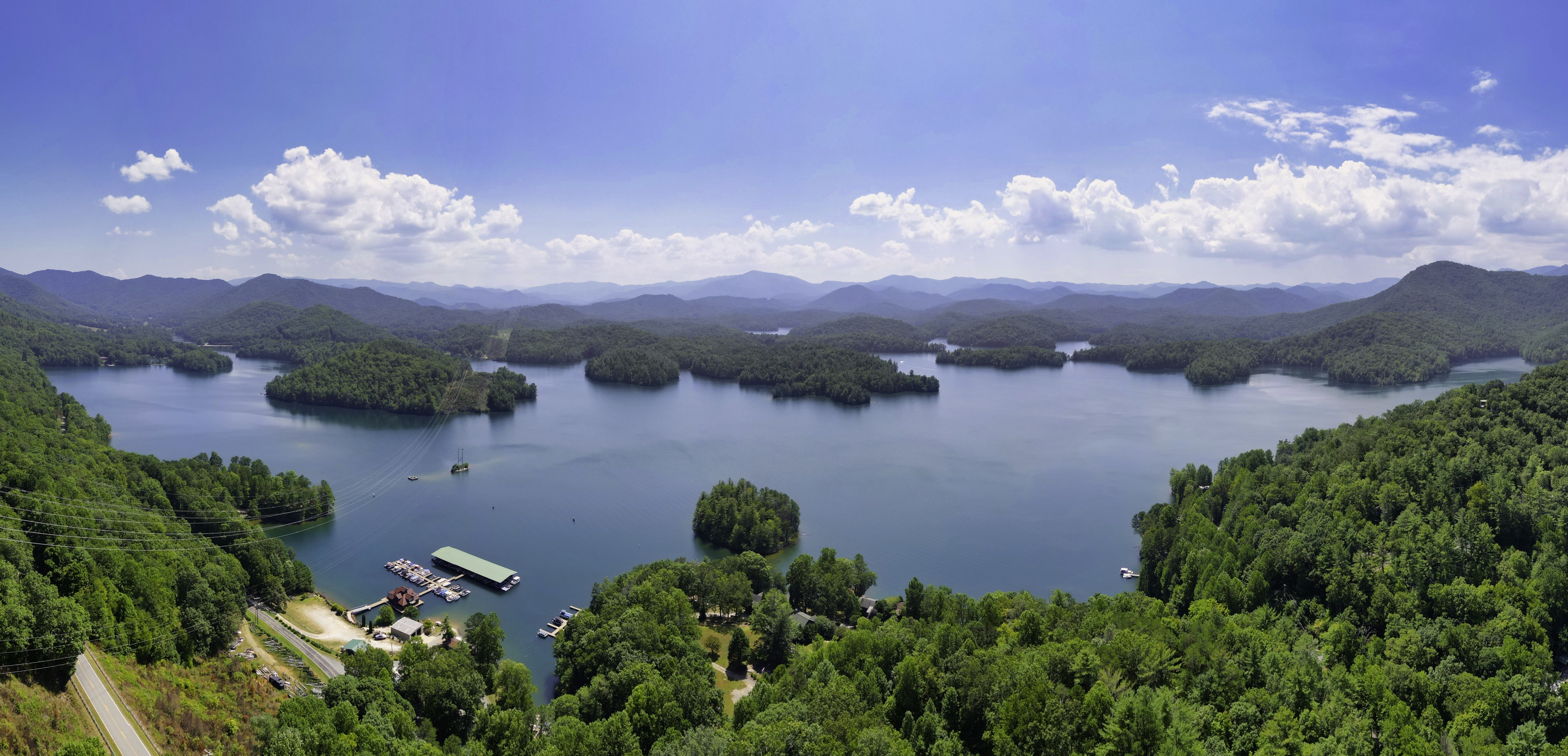
Harbor on Lake Santeetlah

Santeetlah Lake and the Cheoah District of the Nantahala National Forest which surrounds it provide exceptional recreational opportunities. The lake has a variety of fish including smallmouth bass, largemouth bass, walleye, crappie, bream, and lake trout. Santeetlah Marina is the only full-service marina on a lake that has 76 miles (122 km) of shoreline. There are more than fifty primitive campsites scattered around the lake that include a picnic table and fire ring; they have no water or toilets but also require neither permits nor fees.

There are over 200 miles (320 km) of hiking trails in the Cheoah District, and one can hike about 8 miles (13 km) from Lake Santeetlah to the Appalachian Trail. Approximately a mile north of the town is Cheoah Point Recreation Area, which has developed swimming, camping, and picnicking facilities as well as a boat ramp.

The nearby Cheoah River is noted for its Class IV and V whitewater rapids, available for use approximately seventeen days a year depending on the water-release schedule from Santeetlah Dam.

Lake Santeetlah adjoins a portion of U.S. 129 called the Tail of the Dragon, a road frequently used for recreational purposes by motorcycle and sports car enthusiasts because of its purported 318 curves in 11 miles (18 km).

== See also ==
- Lake Santeetlah
