= Charles Noden George House =

Historic house in North Carolina, United States

- U.S. National Register of Historic Places
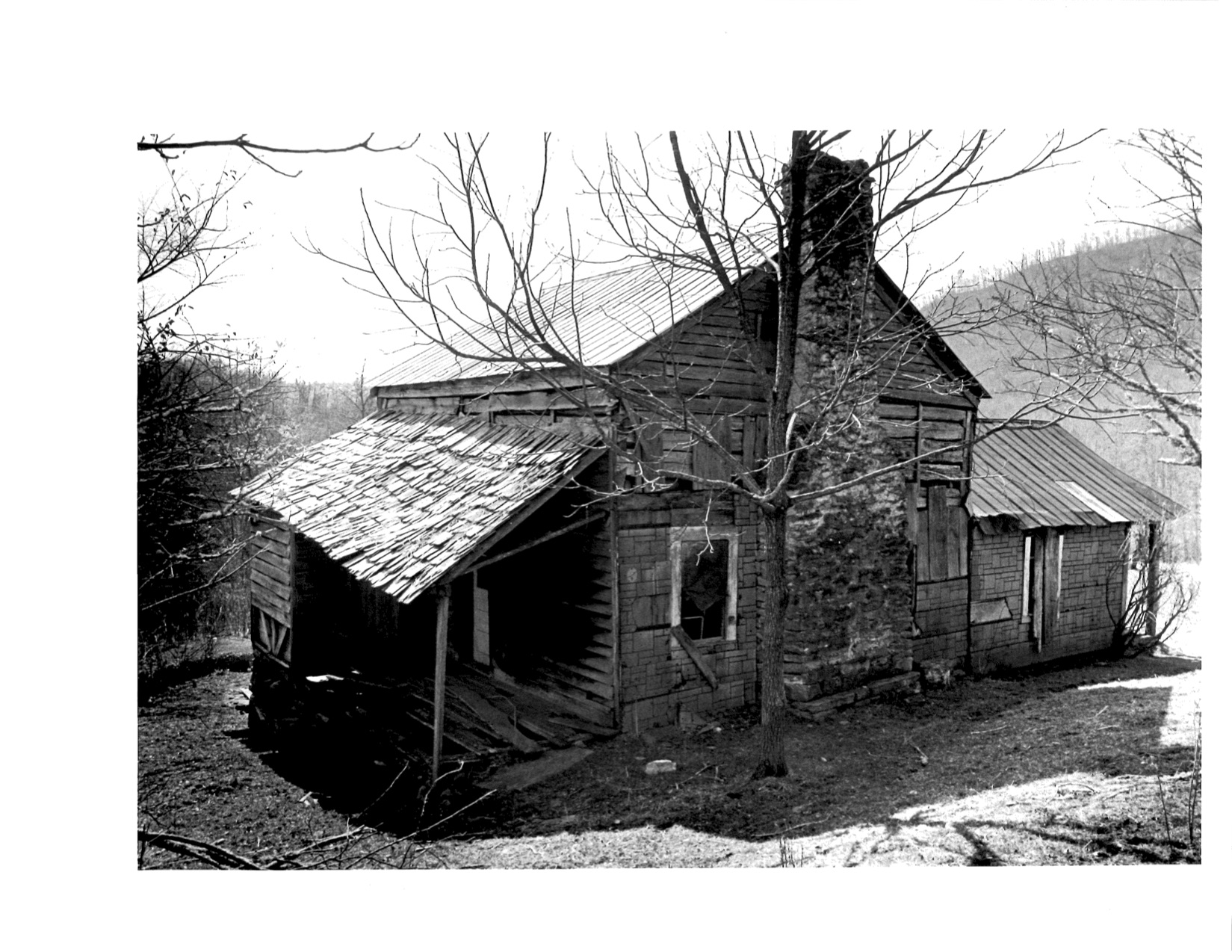

- Location within North Carolina Location within the United States
- Location: Off US 129, near Topton, North Carolina
- Coordinates: 35°16′58″N 83°42′4″W
- Area: 1.6 acres (0.65 ha)
- Built: 1853
- NRHP reference No.: 84002314
- Added to NRHP: April 5, 1984

The Charles Noden George House is a historic house in rural Graham County, North Carolina. It is located on the south side of a private road, 0.4 miles (0.64 km) west of SR 1200 and 1 mile (1.6 km) north of United States Route 129, near Tulula Creek. It is a single-pen log structure built c. 1853, which faces east at the top of a 20-acre (8.1 ha) pasture and overgrown orchard. The logs are poplar, and are joined by half-dovetail notches. A fieldstone chimney rises from the uphill side of the structure, and there is a kitchen ell and a wraparound porch on the south and west sides, added c. 1900. It was built by a veteran of the War of 1812 during the second major wave of development in western North Carolina.

The house was listed on the National Register of Historic Places in 1984.

== See also ==
- National Register of Historic Places listings in Graham County, North Carolina
