= National Register of Historic Places listings in Graham County, North Carolina =

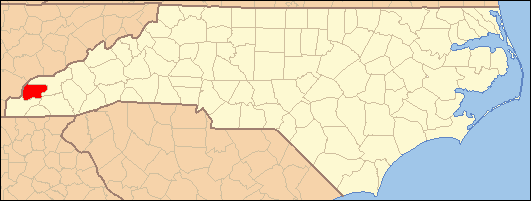

This list includes properties and districts listed on the National Register of Historic Places in Graham County, North Carolina. Click the "Map of all coordinates" link to the right to view an online map of all properties and districts with latitude and longitude coordinates in the table below.

== Current listings ==
This National Park Service list is complete through NPS recent listings posted May 2, 2025.

	Name on the Register	Image	Date listed	Location	City or town	Description
1	Cheoah Hydroelectric Development	Cheoah Hydroelectric Development	May 21, 2004 (#04000464)	1512 Tapoca Rd., NC 129; 35°27′00″N 83°56′10″W	Robbinsville	Extends into Swain County.
2	Fontana Hydroelectric Project	Fontana Hydroelectric Project	August 11, 2017 (#100001462)	1011 Fontana Dam Rd. 35°27′09″N 83°48′18″W	Fontana Dam	
3	Charles Noden George House	Charles Noden George House	April 5, 1984 (#84002314)	Off US 129; 35°16′58″N 83°42′04″W	Topton	
4	Graham County Courthouse	Graham County Courthouse	August 28, 2007 (#07000883)	12 N. Main St. 35°19′21″N 83°48′25″W	Robbinsville	
5	Robbinsville Downtown Historic District	Robbinsville Downtown Historic District	September 3, 2021 (#100006902)	North and South Main St., Moose Branch Rd., Dula St., Laura St., Circle St., and East Main St. 35°19′24″N 83°48′26″W	Robbinsville	
6	Santeetlah Hydroelectric Development	Santeetlah Hydroelectric Development	May 21, 2004 (#04000466)	Dam-Hwy NC 1247, Powerhouse-1277 Farley Branch Rd. 35°23′49″N 83°52′21″W	Robbinsville	
7	Snowbird Mountain Lodge		September 2, 1993 (#93000885)	275 Santeetlah Rd. 35°20′31″N 83°53′29″W	Robbinsville	
8	Tapoco Lodge Historic District	Tapoco Lodge Historic District	May 21, 2004 (#04000465)	14981 Tapoco Rd. 35°26′31″N 83°56′19″W	Robbinsville	

== See also ==
- National Register of Historic Places listings in North Carolina
- List of National Historic Landmarks in North Carolina
