= Stecoah =

Community in North Carolina

Stecoah is a community in northern Graham County, North Carolina. It has also been documented as Stekoah.

The Stecoah Valley Cultural Arts Center is in the former Stecoah Union School. The stone building's auditorium has been restored and it is adorned with the school colors, blue and gold. A historic panoramic photographic of people outside it is also on display.

The former Cherokee village of Stecoah (Too-Cowee) was home to Cherokee until it was destroyed and later sold. It is a historic site in Martin County.

There is a Stecoah Gap and a Stecoah Creek.

North Carolina State Senator Joel Lafayette Crisp lived in Stecoah.
