= Atwell C. McIntosh =

American politician

Atwell Campbell McIntosh
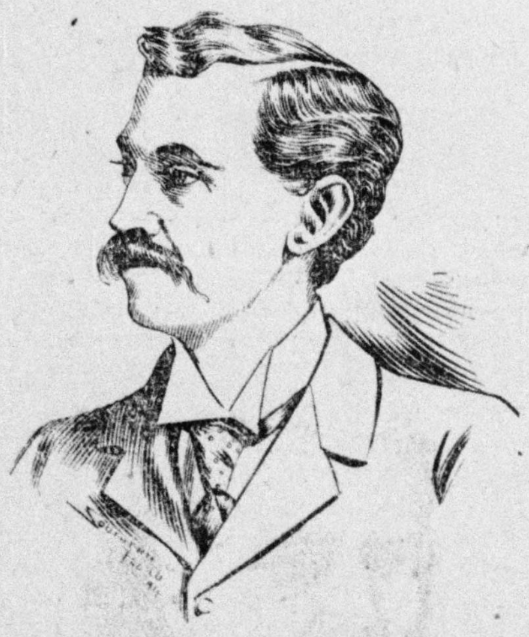

Member of the North Carolina House of Representatives from Alexander County
- In office 1899

Personal details
- Born: 1859 Taylorsville, North Carolina
- Died: January 27, 1939 (aged 79–80) Durham, North Carolina
- Party: Democratic

Atwell Campbell McIntosh (1859 – January 27, 1939) was an American legal scholar. A member of the Democratic Party, he served in the North Carolina House of Representatives in 1899.

== Early life ==
Atwell Campbell McIntosh was born in Taylorsville, North Carolina in 1859. He earned a bachelor's degree from Davidson College in 1881 and, after studying law under an attorney and a superior court judge, was licensed as an attorney the following year.

== Career ==
After receiving his law degree, McIntosh practiced law and variously served as an educator in Taylorsville, Sumter, South Carolina, Macon, Mississippi, and in Lexington, North Carolina. After winning election in 1898, he served in the North Carolina General Assembly of 1899–1900.

In 1904, McIntosh was hired as a professor at Trinity College. He served in that capacity until 1910, when he was hired by the University of North Carolina School of Law.

== Late life ==
McIntosh retired from teaching due to health reasons in 1934. He died on January 27, 1939 at Watts Hospital in Durham, North Carolina.
