= Isaac H. Smith =

American businessman and politician (1852–1915)

Isaac Hughes Smith
- Engraved portrait of Smith c. 1890

Member of the North Carolina House of Representatives from Craven County
- In office 1899–1900

Personal details
- Born: May 15, 1852
- Died: July 6, 1915 (aged 63) New Bern, North Carolina
- Party: Republican
- Education: Saint Augustine's College

Isaac Hughes Smith (May 5, 1852 – July 6, 1915) was an American banker, real estate developer, and politician.

== Early life ==
Little is known about Isaac Smith's early life. He was born in or near Craven County, North Carolina around May 5, 1852 to Thomas and Harriet Smith. It is unknown whether he was born enslaved or free. He was tutored by a white family and attended Saint Augustine's College.

Smith married Visey Dudley in Craven County on December 24, 1875, and had one child with her. She later died. On June 30, 1898, he married Carrie Marie Rhone and had five children with her.

== Business career ==
Deed records suggest that Smith began dealing in real estate transactions in Craven County in the early 1870s. His property holdings grew over the years and he also briefly served as a teacher in New Bern. He later quit teaching to pursue lending and insurance selling, which complimented his real estate business. A section of New Bern became dubbed "Smithtown" in his honor for his role in developing it. Much of it was later destroyed in a fire which engulfed the city in 1922. He was an investor in the Coleman Manufacturing Company of Concord.

== Political career ==
=== Early activities ===
Following his success in business, Smith developed an interest in politics and became active in the Republican Party. He claimed to be an early supporter of William McKinley for the Republican nomination in the 1896 U.S. presidential election. As a result, he was considered to be a leading for appointment to office of Recorder of Deeds for the District of Columbia, a top patronage position. This resulted in a feud between him and John C. Dancy, another leading candidate for the post.

=== Legislative career ===
In 1898, Smith ran as a candidate for the seat in the North Carolina House of Representatives representing Craven County. Despite a white supremacist campaign conducted by the Democratic Party and its overall landslide victory in the state, voters in Craven elected multiple black Republicans to office, and Smith subsequently became one of four black men to serve in the House in 1899.

Smith was primarily concerned with defeating the Democrats' planned suffrage constitutional amendment which would entail the disenfranchisement of black voters. Thus, while he worked earnestly to defeat it, he was willing to make other concessions toward Democrats to curry their favor. To that end, he voted for the Democratic speaker of the House, voted with Democrats to remove James H. Young's name from the new building of the Asylum for the Deaf and Dumb and the Blind, and said that the Democratic Party could appeal to black voters. Angered by his willingness to break with them, on January 7, 1899, the Republican legislative caucus voted unanimously to expel him. He spoke before the House to denounce his expulsion from the caucus, with his remarks being eagerly entertained by the Democratic legislators, though they did not support his other legislative endeavors.

Without success, Smith pushed for Craven County to be included in North Carolina's 2nd congressional district, for equal compensation to court witnesses without regards to color, for one black to be appointed to the board of trustees for any black school, and for any black child between six and 11 years of age in Craven County to be required to attend school. His only major success was in convincing the House to adopt a resolution urging North Carolina's delegation in the U.S. Congress to pass a law compensation blacks for their losses in the failure of the Freedman's Savings Bank. He served only one term in the legislature, leaving after the term's last session in mid-1900, being disillusioned with both the Republican Party and the administration of Governor Daniel Lindsay Russell. He thereafter returned to his business concerns.

== Later life ==
Smith died at his home in New Bern due to diabetes on July 6, 1915. At the time of his death, his estate was reported to be worth $150,000 and he was proclaimed to have been one of the wealthiest blacks in eastern North Carolina. He left a detailed will which set aside funds for his wife, son, several relatives, Shaw University, the National Religious Training School, and several black churches in New Bern. He was buried in New Bern's Greenwood Cemetery.

== Works cited ==
- Bishir, Catherine W. (2013). Crafting Lives : African American Artisans in New Bern, North Carolina, 1770-1900. Chapel Hill: The University of North Carolina Press. ISBN 9781469608761.
- Edmonds, Helen G. (2013). The Negro and Fusion Politics in North Carolina, 1894-1901 (revised ed.). Chapel Hill: The University of North Carolina Press. ISBN 9781469610955.
- Higginbotham, Evelyn Brooks; Gates, Henry Louis Jr., eds. (2008). The African American National Biography: Roman-Tzomes. The African American National Biography. Vol. 7. Oxford University Press. ISBN 9780195160192.
- Massengill, Stephen E. (1994). "Smith, Isaac Hughes". Dictionary of North Carolina Biography. Vol. 5. Chapel Hill: The University of North Carolina Press. pp. 378–379. ISBN 9780807867006.
- Watson, Alan D. (1987). A History of New Bern and Craven County. New Bern: Tryon Palace Commission. OCLC 17398679.
