= Gaston L. White =

American politician

Member of the North Carolina House of Representatives from Davie County
- In office 1899

Personal details
- Born: December 10, 1856 North Carolina, U.S.
- Died: May 15, 1945 (aged 88)
- Party: Republican

Gaston L. White (December 10, 1856 – May 15, 1945) was an American politician. He represented Davie County in the North Carolina House of Representatives in 1899.
