= Tapoco, North Carolina =

- Unincorporated community
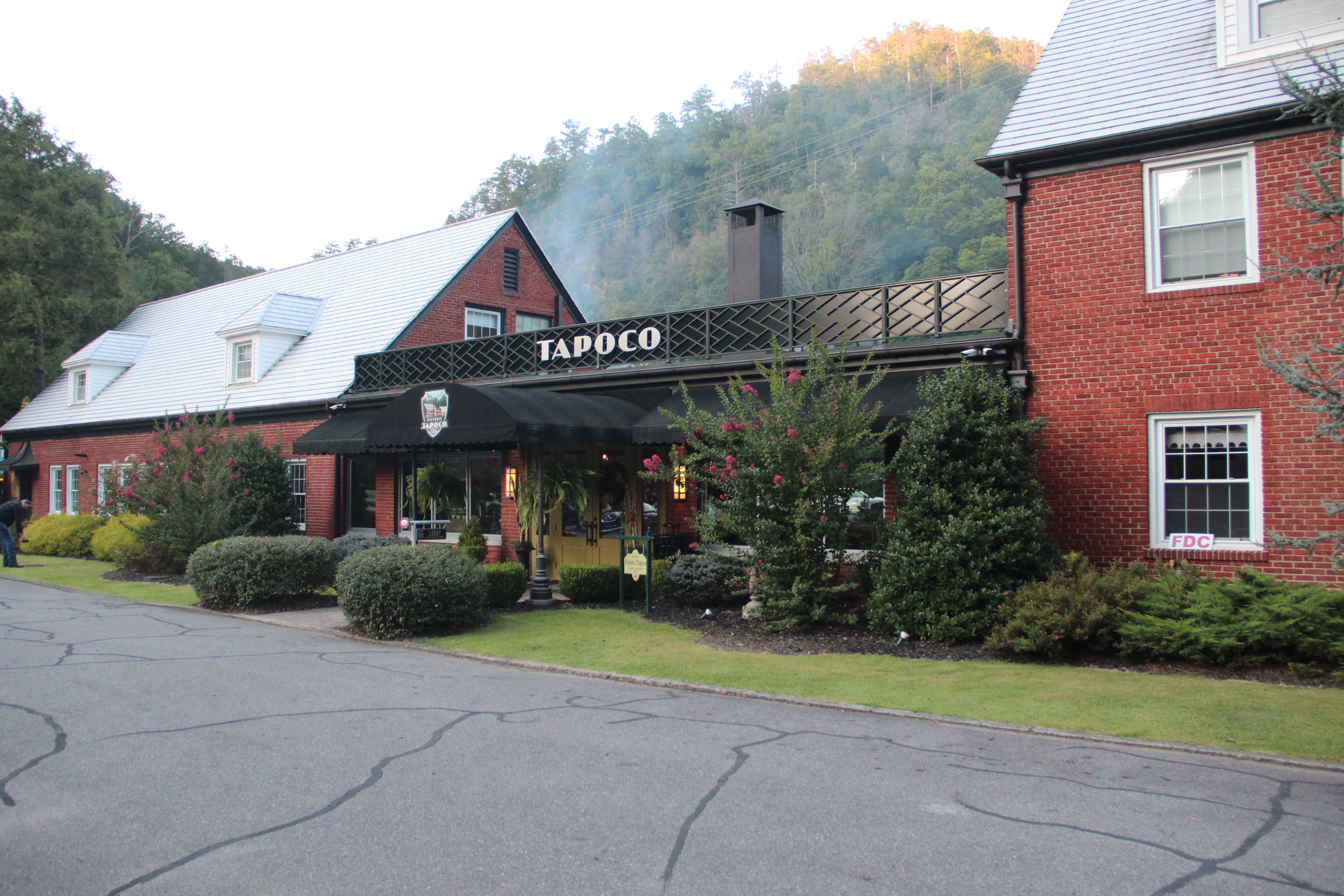
- Tapoco Lodge

- Location within North Carolina Location within the United States
- Coordinates: 35°26′36″N 83°56′13″W
- Country: United States
- State: North Carolina
- County: Graham
- Elevation: 1,171 ft (357 m)
- Time zone: UTC-5 (Eastern (EST))
  - Summer (DST): UTC-4 (EDT)
- Area code: 828
- GNIS feature ID: 995845

Tapoco is an unincorporated community in Graham County, North Carolina, United States. Tapoco is located on U.S. Route 129 near the Little Tennessee River, 11 miles (18 km) northwest of Robbinsville. Named for the acronym of the former Tallassee Power Company, Tapoco had a post office until it closed on October 26, 1995.
