= Julius H. Hoffman =

American politician

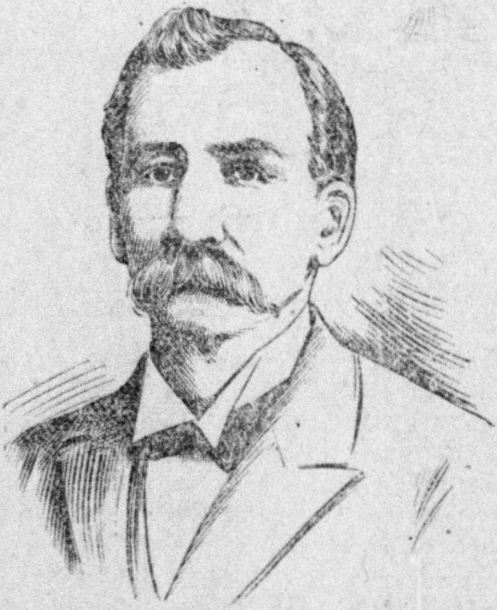

Member of the North Carolina House of Representatives from Burke County
- In office 1899

Personal details
- Born: December 28, 1849
- Died: December 21, 1909 (aged 59)
- Party: Democratic

Julius H. Hoffman (December 28, 1849 – December 21, 1909) was an American farmer and politician. He represented Burke County in the North Carolina House of Representatives in 1899.

== Early life ==
Julius H. Hoffman was born in Burke County, North Carolina on December 28, 1849. Raised on a farm, he studied at Rutherford College. Upon completing his education, he managed a farm outside Morganton along the Catawba River. In 1875, he married Mattie E. Corpening. They had five children together.

== Political career ==
Hoffman served variously as the county surveyor for Burke County, as a county commissioner, as a deputy tax collector, and on the local board of education. He was elected to the North Carolina General Assembly in 1889, 1893, and 1898.
