= W. C. Coates =

American politician

Member of the North Carolina House of Representatives from Northampton County
- In office 1899

Personal details
- Party: Republican

W. C. Coates was a state legislator in the state of North Carolina. He represented Northampton County in the North Carolina House of Representatives in 1899.
