= Cicero T. Ellen =

American politician

Member of the North Carolina House of Representatives from Nash County
- In office 1899–1901

Personal details
- Party: Democratic

Cicero T. Ellen was an American politician. He represented Nash County in the North Carolina House of Representatives from 1899 to 1901.
