= George M. Fleming =

American politician

George Marion Fleming
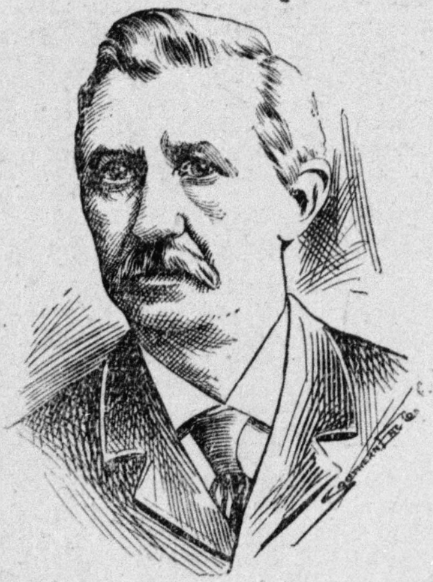

Member of the North Carolina House of Representatives from Clay County
- In office 1899

Personal details
- Born: December 15, 1849 Hayesville, North Carolina, U.S.
- Died: November 14, 1930 (aged 80)
- Party: Democratic

George Marion Fleming (December 15, 1849 – November 14, 1930) was an American farmer and politician. He represented Clay County in the North Carolina House of Representatives in 1899.

== Early life ==
George Marion Fleming was born in Clay County, North Carolina on December 15, 1849. He was educated in local schools.

== Career ==
Following the completion of his schooling, Fleming farmed until 1878, when he was elected register of deeds for Clay County. He was continuously reelected to the position until he retired to farming in 1896. In 1898, he was elected to a seat in the North Carolina House of Representatives.
