= Cheoah River =

Cheoah River Tributary to Little Tennessee River
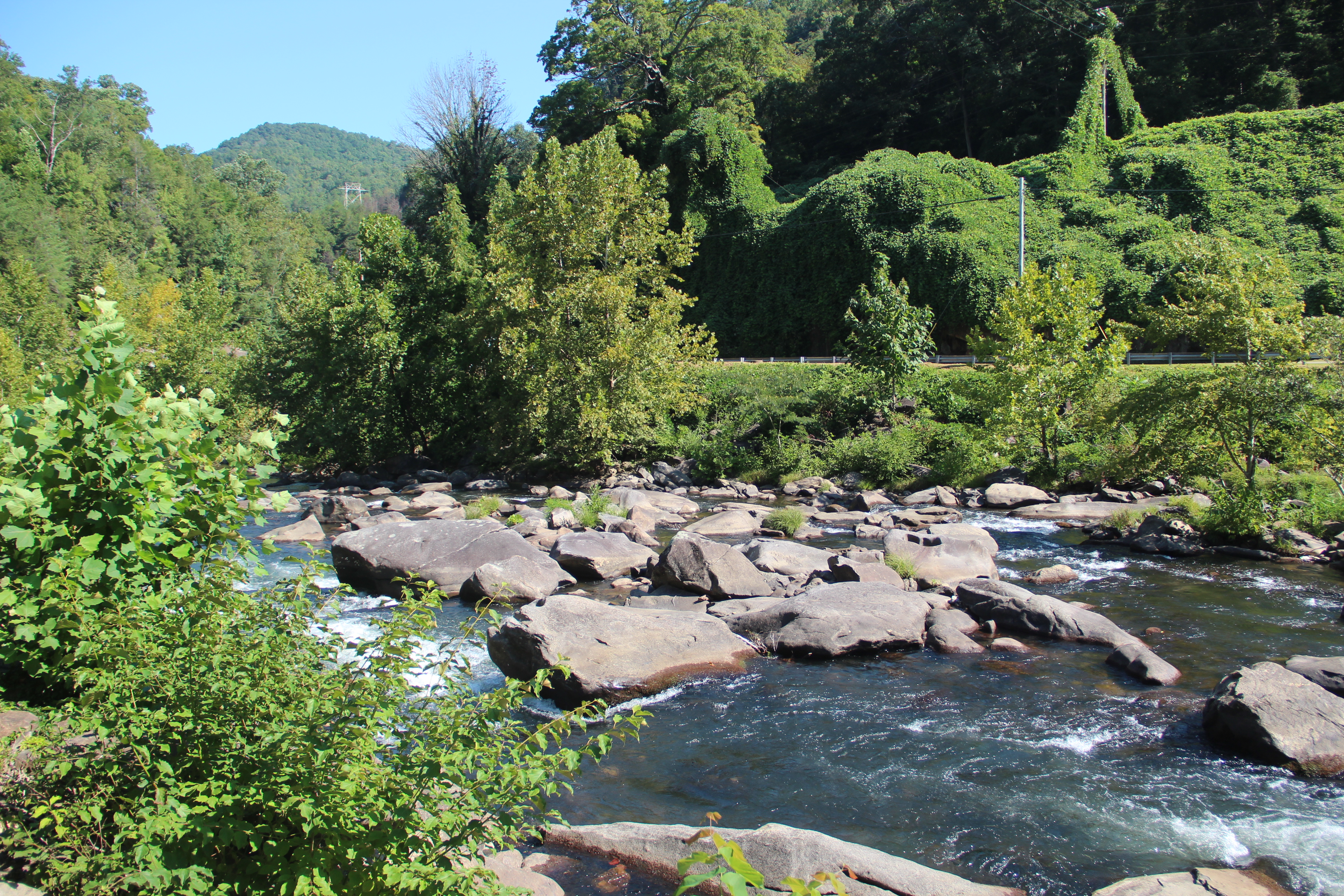
- Cheoah River in Tapoco, North Carolina

Location
- Country: United States
- State: North Carolina
- County: Graham; Swain

Physical characteristics
- Source: Confluence of Sweetwater and Tulula Creeks
  - location: Robbinsville, North Carolina
  - coordinates: 35°19′38.3196″N 83°48′7.635″W
  - elevation: 1,993 ft (607 m)
- Mouth
  - location: Little Tennessee River
  - coordinates: 35°26′55.307″N 83°56′22.65″W
  - elevation: 1,106 ft (337 m)
- Length: 18.16 mi (29.23 km)
- Basin size: 215.14 mi^{2} (557.2 km^{2})
- Discharge
  - location: Little Tennessee River
  - average: 687.43 cu ft/s (19.466 m^{3}/s) at mouth with Little Tennessee River

Basin features
- Progression: northwest
- River system: Little Tennessee → Tennessee → Ohio → Mississippi
- Tributaries
  - left: Tulula Creek; Long Creek; Stillhouse Hollow; Massey Branch; Snowbird Creek; West Buffalo Creek; Charikus Branch; Farley Cove; Santeetlah Creek; Gold Mine Branch; Rock Creek; Laurel Branch; Persimmon Tree Branch; Falls Branch; Deep Creek; Frisby Branch; Barker Creek; Bear Creek; Otter Rock Branch; Yellowhammer Branch
  - right: Sweetwater Creek; Mountain Creek; Ground Squirrel Branch; East Buffalo Creek; Gladdens Creek; Cochran Creek; Cochran Creek; Yellow Creek; Puncheon Camp Branch; Halfmile Branch; Meadow Branch
- Waterbodies: Santeetlah Lake

The Cheoah River is a tributary of the Little Tennessee River in North Carolina in the United States.

It is located in Graham County in far western North Carolina, near Robbinsville, and is approximately 20 miles in length. Its headwaters are in the Appalachian Mountains where it flows northwest near Robbinsville to Lake Santeetlah, then towards the Tennessee border with a terminus at the Little Tennessee between the Cheoah Dam and Lake Calderwood.

== Etymology ==
The name Cheoah is derived from the Cherokee Native American word for "otter." According to the Geographic Names Information System, the river has also been known historically as:

- Cheowa River
- Cheowah River
