= Joel Lafayette Crisp =

American politician

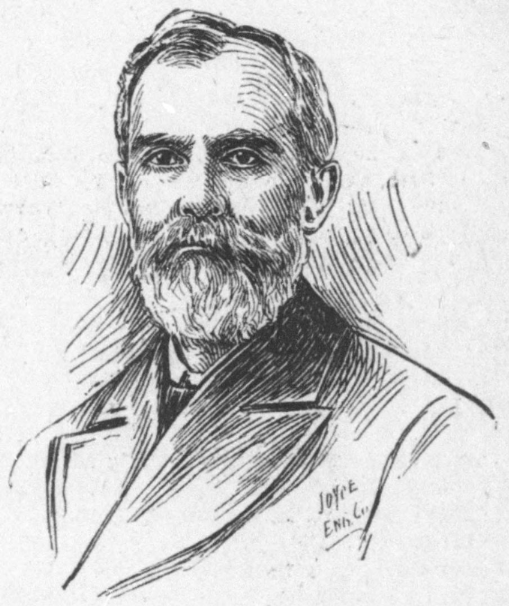
Engraved portrait of Crisp c. 1901

Joel Lafayette Crisp was a state legislator in North Carolina. He served in the North Carolina Senate from 1899-1905 representing Graham County. He served in the North Carolina House of Representatives in 1887.

Joel L. Crisp was born on December 6, 1842 in Cherokee County, North Carolina. Shortly after the outbreak of the American Civil War, he enlisted in Company K of the First North Carolina Regiment of Cavalry in the Confederate States Army. He rose to the rank of sergeant by the end of the war. He married Amanda Stillwell on August 10, 1865 and had eight children with her.

He applied for a pension for his Confederate Army service.

He served as a teller in the Senate reporting votes from the body and the North Carolina House of Representatives for the state's U.S. Senate candidates.

== See also ==
- North Carolina General Assembly of 1899–1900
