= Tapoco Lodge Historic District =

Historic district in North Carolina, United States

- U.S. National Register of Historic Places
- U.S. Historic district
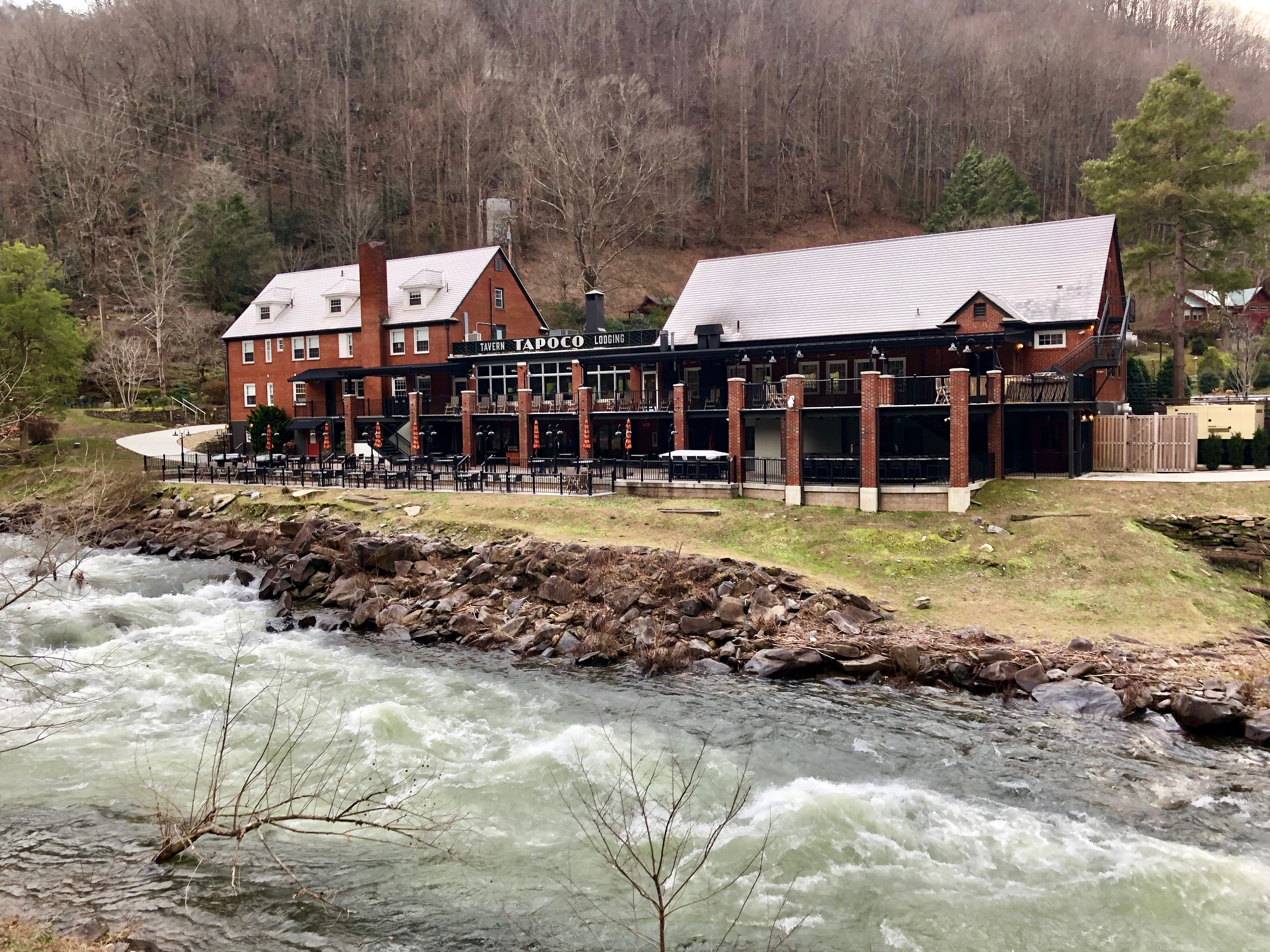
- Tapoco Lodge, December 2018

- Location within North Carolina Location within the United States
- Location: 14981 Tapoco Rd., Robbinsville, North Carolina
- Coordinates: 35°26′31″N 83°56′19″W
- Area: 122 acres (49 ha)
- Built: 1930
- Built by: Tapoco, Inc.
- Architectural style: Colonial Revival
- MPS: Tapoco Hydroelectric Project MPS
- NRHP reference No.: 04000465
- Added to NRHP: May 21, 2004

The Tapoco Lodge Historic District encompasses a historic mountain lodge and resort in Robbinsville, North Carolina. The lodge was developed in the 1930s by Tapoco, formerly the Tallassee Power Company, which developed hydroelectric power projects in the area. The lodge and associated cabins were built to provide housing for Tapoco employees working in the area. The main lodge, a 2-1/2 story Colonial Revival structure, was built in 1930, and the facilities were gradually enlarged during the next decade to include a number of guest cabins. Around 1950 a theater, guard house, and other utility buildings were added to the complex. Gazebos and tennis courts were added in the late 1990s.

The property was listed on the National Register of Historic Places in 2004.

== See also ==
- National Register of Historic Places listings in Graham County, North Carolina
