= W. A. Tharpe =

American politician

Member of the North Carolina House of Representatives from Wilkes County
- In office 1899

Personal details
- Party: Republican

W. A. Tharpe was an American politician. He represented Wilkes County in the North Carolina House of Representatives in 1899.
