= W. H. Carroll =

American politician

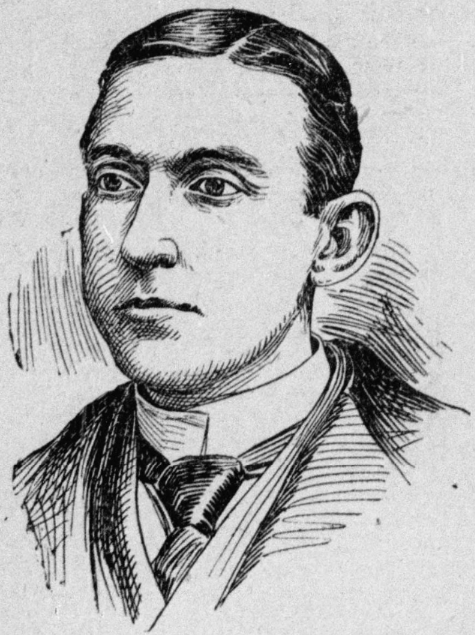

Member of the North Carolina House of Representatives from Alamance County
- In office 1899

Personal details
- Party: Democratic

W. H. Carroll was an American politician. He represented Alamance County in the North Carolina House of Representatives in 1899.
