= Riley J. Petree =

American politician

Member of the North Carolina House of Representatives from Stokes County
- In office 1893–1901

Personal details
- Born: November 9, 1853 Stokes County, North Carolina, U.S.
- Died: May 23, 1928 (aged 74)
- Party: Republican

Riley J. Petree (November 9, 1853 – May 23, 1928) was an American politician. He represented Stokes County in the North Carolina House of Representatives from 1899 to 1901.
