= Lake Santeetlah =

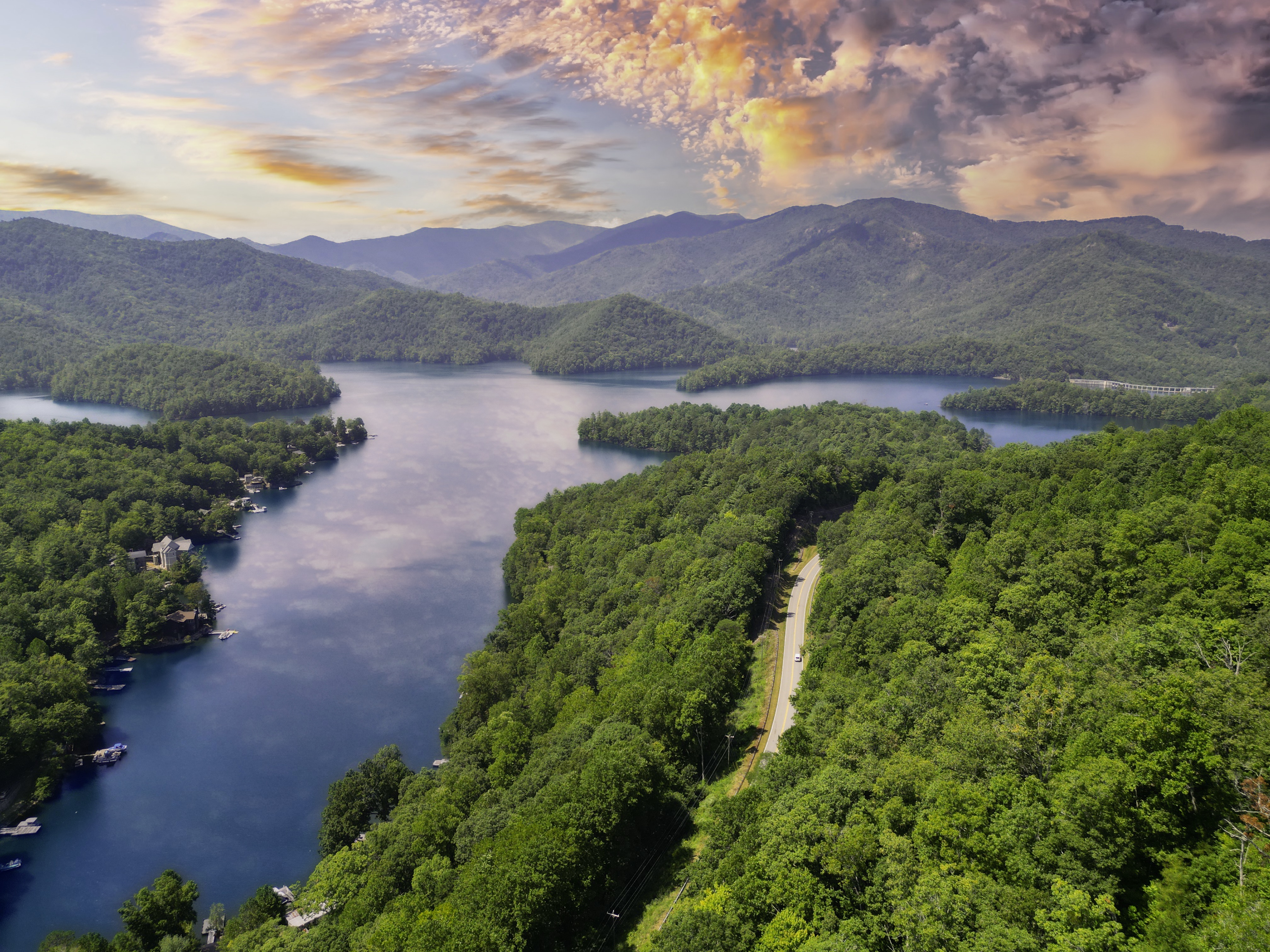

- Location within North Carolina Location within the United States
- Location: Graham County, North Carolina
- Coordinates: 35°21′15″N 83°51′39″W
- Type: reservoir
- Primary inflows: Cheoah River
- Primary outflows: Cheoah River
- Basin countries: United States
- Shore length^{1}: 76 miles (122 km)
- Surface elevation: 1,932 ft (589 m)
- ^{1} Shore length is not a well-defined measure.

Lake Santeetlah, part of the Tennessee River watershed, was created in 1928 when Alcoa dammed the Cheoah River as a means of generating hydroelectric power in Graham County, North Carolina. The name "Santeelah" is derived from a Native American word which means "blue waters." The reservoir is largely surrounded by the Cheoah District of the Nantahala National Forest. During the last decades of the twentieth century non-public lands were developed as scenic residences and vacation homes, most notably in the area now incorporated as the town of Lake Santeetlah.

Although the area below the highwater mark is now managed by Brookfield Energy Partners (BEP), which purchased the lake from Alcoa, approximately 80% of the surrounding land is under the jurisdiction of the U.S. Forest Service, which provides swimming, camping, picnicking, fishing and boating facilities. Lake Santeetlah has 76 miles (122 km) of shore line and is home to a variety of trout, muskie, crappie, and bass. Of special note is the adjoining Joyce Kilmer Memorial Forest, which was set aside in 1936 as a memorial to poet-soldier Joyce Kilmer, and is an example of original, "old growth forest" in the eastern United States.
