= Graham County, North Carolina =

County in North Carolina, United States

- County
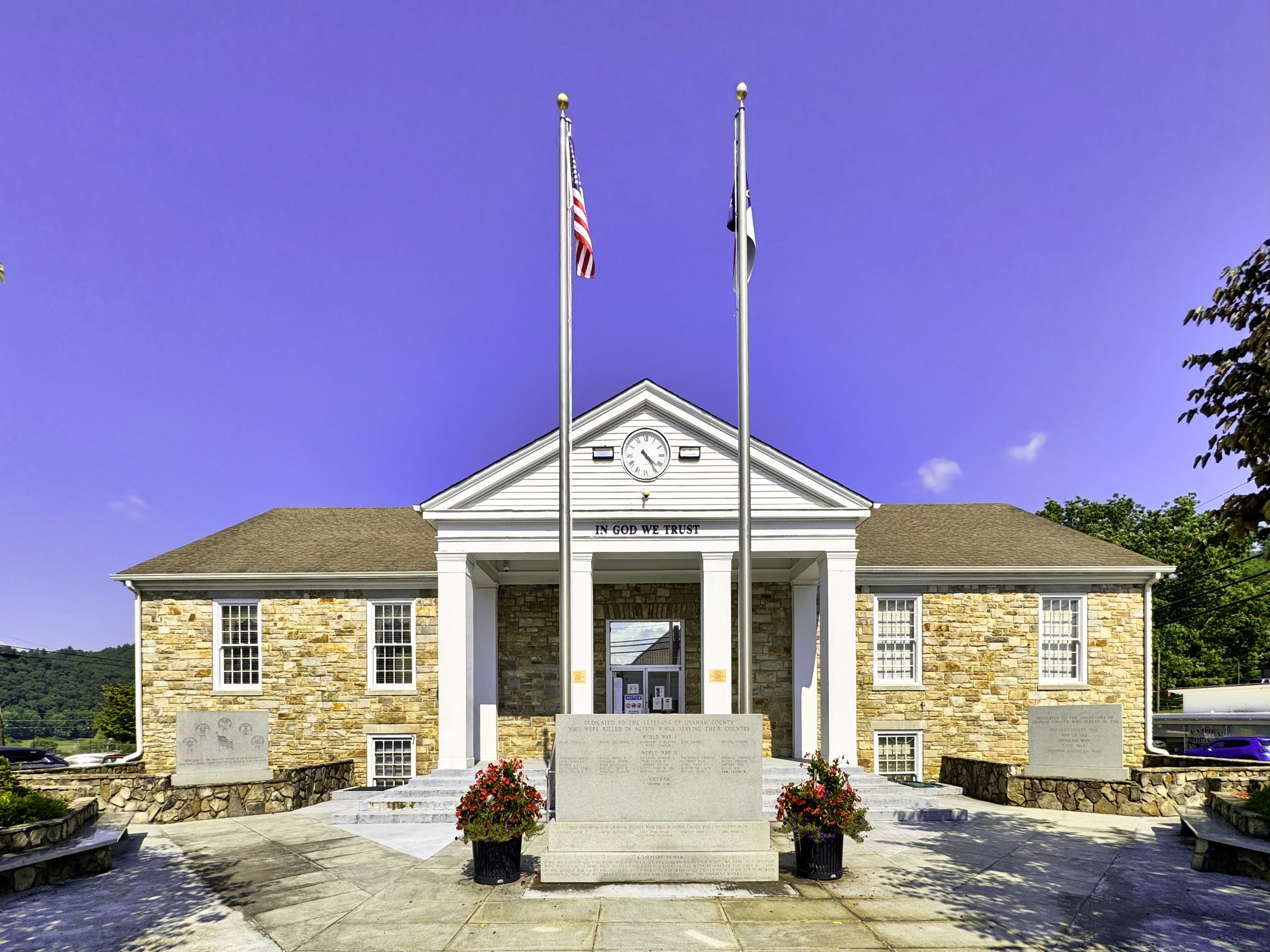
- Graham County Courthouse in Robbinsville

- Seal
- Motto: "With A Proud History That Runs As Deep As The Roots of Her Trees"
- Location within the U.S. state of North Carolina
- Interactive map of Graham County, North Carolina
- Coordinates: 35.35°N 83.83°W
- Country: United States
- State: North Carolina
- Founded: 1872
- Named for: William A. Graham
- Seat: Robbinsville
- Largest community: Robbinsville

Area
  - Total: 301.65 sq mi (781.3 km^{2})
  - Land: 291.97 sq mi (756.2 km^{2})
  - Water: 9.68 sq mi (25.1 km^{2}) 3.21%

Population (2020)
  - Total: 8,030
  - Estimate (2025): 8,190 ▲
  - Density: 27.5/sq mi (10.6/km^{2})
- Time zone: UTC−5 (Eastern)
  - Summer (DST): UTC−4 (EDT)
- Congressional district: 11th
- Website: www.grahamcounty.org

Graham County (locally /ˈɡreɪˌhæm/) is a county located in the U.S. state of North Carolina. As of the 2020 census, the population was 8,030, making it the third-least populous county in North Carolina. Its county seat is Robbinsville.

== History ==
The county was formed January 30, 1872, from the northeastern part of Cherokee County. It was named for William A. Graham, United States Senator from North Carolina (1840–1843) and Governor of North Carolina (1845–1849).

The first Graham County Courthouse was constructed in Robbinsville in 1874, but its floor collapsed two decades later while the building was packed during a murder trial. A replacement, built in 1895, was the last wooden courthouse built in North Carolina. The third and current building was completed in 1942.

In 1914, the U.S. Supreme Court settled a 22-year border dispute in which parts of Graham County were claimed by Tennessee. The land was awarded to North Carolina. The first public library in Graham County opened in Robbinsville in 1939. It joined the Nantahala Regional Library system in 1940. The facility was torn down in 1952 and replaced with a newer building which opened on April 6, 1953.

An F2 tornado struck Graham County during the 1974 Super Outbreak causing two deaths and 11 injuries. The community of Stecoah near Fontana Lake saw widespread damage.

On August 31, 1982, nine U.S. Air Force personnel were killed in Graham County during a training exercise when their plane crashed during a storm near John's Knob and Stratton Ridge. There is a 2015 memorial near the Cherohala Skyway, though victims' families have asked that it be moved to a more accessible location.

== Geography ==
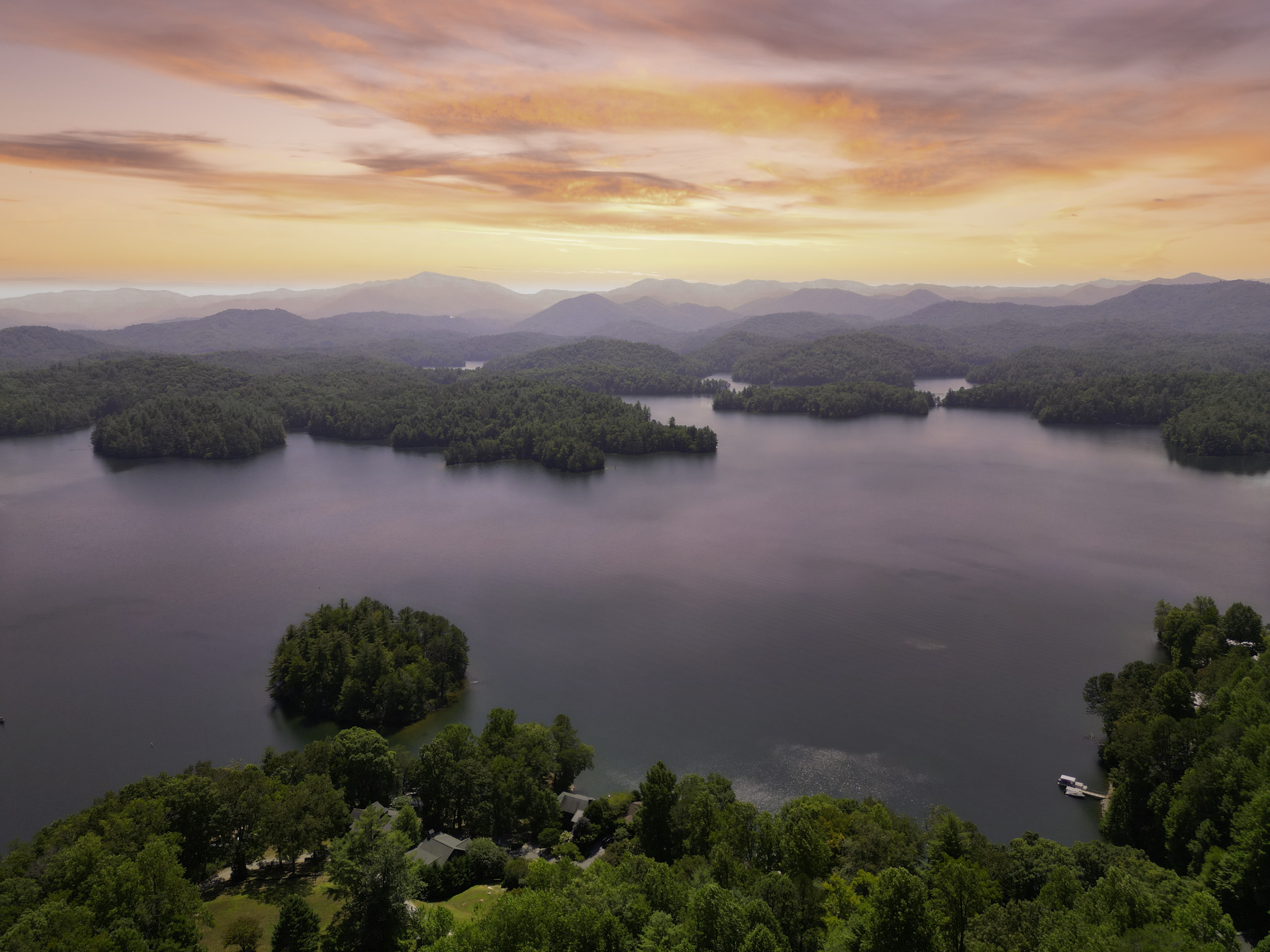
Lake Santeetlah

Interactive map of Graham County

According to the U.S. Census Bureau, the county has a total area of 301.65 square miles (781.3 km^{2}), of which 291.97 square miles (756.2 km^{2}) is land and 9.68 square miles (25.1 km^{2}) (3.21%) is water. The terrain of the county is mountainous, with elevations ranging from 1,177 to 5,560 feet (359 to 1,695 m). Two-thirds of the county is the Nantahala National Forest. The soil of the valleys is fertile.

Fontana Lake, an impoundment of the Little Tennessee River, forms most of the northern border of the county, with the Great Smoky Mountains National Park on the other side of the lake. Fontana Lake is formed by Fontana Dam, the tallest dam in the eastern U.S. The remainder of the northern boundary of Graham County is almost completely formed by another impoundment of the Little Tennessee River, downstream from Fontana Dam, created by Cheoah Dam. Fontana Dam and Cheoah Dam are both operated by the Tennessee Valley Authority.

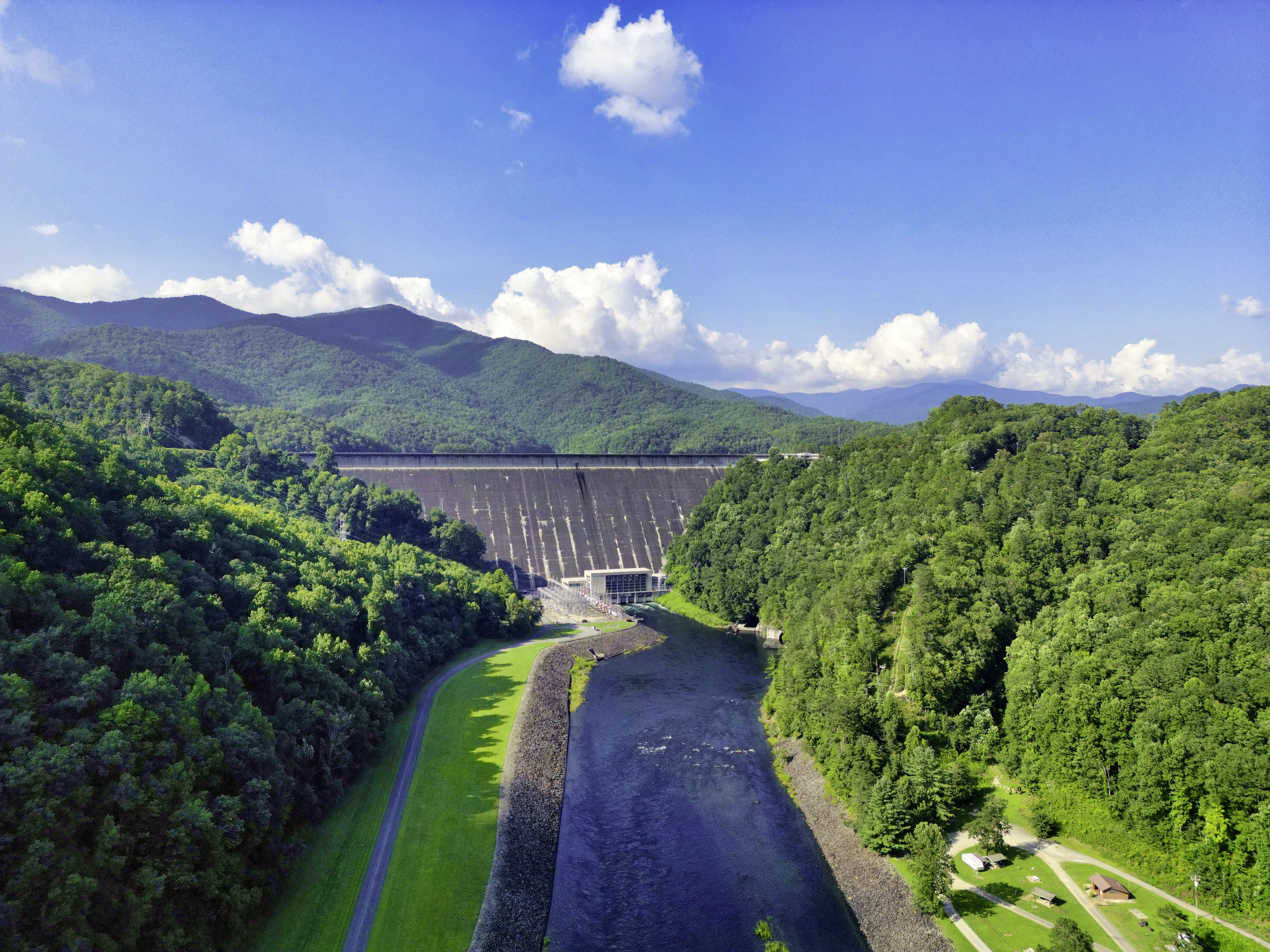
Fontana Dam is the tallest dam in the Eastern United States

The Appalachian Trail winds through Graham County. Part of the trail is located on top of Fontana Dam. The Cheoah River is noted for its Class IV and Class V whitewater rapids. The river is used for whitewater rafting about 17 days per year, based on a water-release schedule from Santeetlah Dam. Seventy-five percent of Lake Santeetlah shoreline borders national forest.

Joyce Kilmer Memorial Forest, a rare example of an old growth cove hardwood forest, is located in northwestern Graham County. Joyce Kilmer Memorial Forest is part of the Joyce Kilmer-Slickrock Wilderness area.

The eastern terminus of the Cherohala Skyway is located in northwestern Graham County. The 43-mile (69 km) Cherohala Skyway connects Graham County with Tellico Plains, Tennessee.

The Cherokee name for the area, Nantahala, is translated as "land of the noon-day sun" because 90% of the land is slopes of 30 degrees or greater, suggesting that in the valleys one sees the sun only in the middle of the day.

As of 2024, Graham County has the third lowest amount of agricultural acreage in the state. The county has 2,256 acres of agricultural land and 70 farms.

=== Cherokee reserve ===
Portions of the Qualla Boundary are located in Graham County. These sections of the Qualla Boundary are non-contiguous from the primary part of the Qualla Boundary located in Swain, Jackson, Cherokee and Haywood counties. The Eastern Band of Cherokee Indians who live in Graham County form the Snowbird Cherokee community.

=== National protected areas ===
- Appalachian Trail (part)
- Cherohala Skyway (part)
- Great Smoky Mountains National Park (part)
- Joyce Kilmer-Slickrock Wilderness (part)
- Nantahala National Forest (part)

=== State and local protected area ===
- Nantahala National Forest Game Land (part)

=== Major water bodies ===
- Deep Creek
- Fontana Lake
- Hooper Mill Creek
- Little Santeetlah Creek
- Little Tennessee River
- Santeetlah Creek
- Santeetlah Lake
- Snowbird Creek
- Tulula Creek

=== Adjacent counties ===
- Blount County, Tennessee – north
- Swain County – northeast
- Macon County – southeast
- Cherokee County – south
- Monroe County, Tennessee – west

=== Major highways ===
- US 129
- NC 28
- NC 143
- NC 143 Bus.

== Demographics ==
Historical population
Census	Pop.	Note	%±
1880	2,335		—
1890	3,313		41.9%
1900	4,343		31.1%
1910	4,749		9.3%
1920	4,872		2.6%
1930	5,841		19.9%
1940	6,418		9.9%
1950	6,886		7.3%
1960	6,432		−6.6%
1970	6,562		2.0%
1980	7,217		10.0%
1990	7,196		−0.3%
2000	7,993		11.1%
2010	8,861		10.9%
2020	8,030		−9.4%
2025 (est.)	8,190	▲	2.0%
U.S. Decennial Census; 1790–1960 1900–1990; 1990–2000 2010 2020

As of 2025, the median net worth in Graham County is $216,556 and the median annual household income is $51,959. Graham County has 299 businesses as of 2025. The county's jobless rate was 3.2 percent as of 2025. As of 2024, Graham County has some of the lowest access to computing devices in North Carolina, ranking 98th out of the state's 100 counties. Graham County's homeless population was 48 as of 2025.

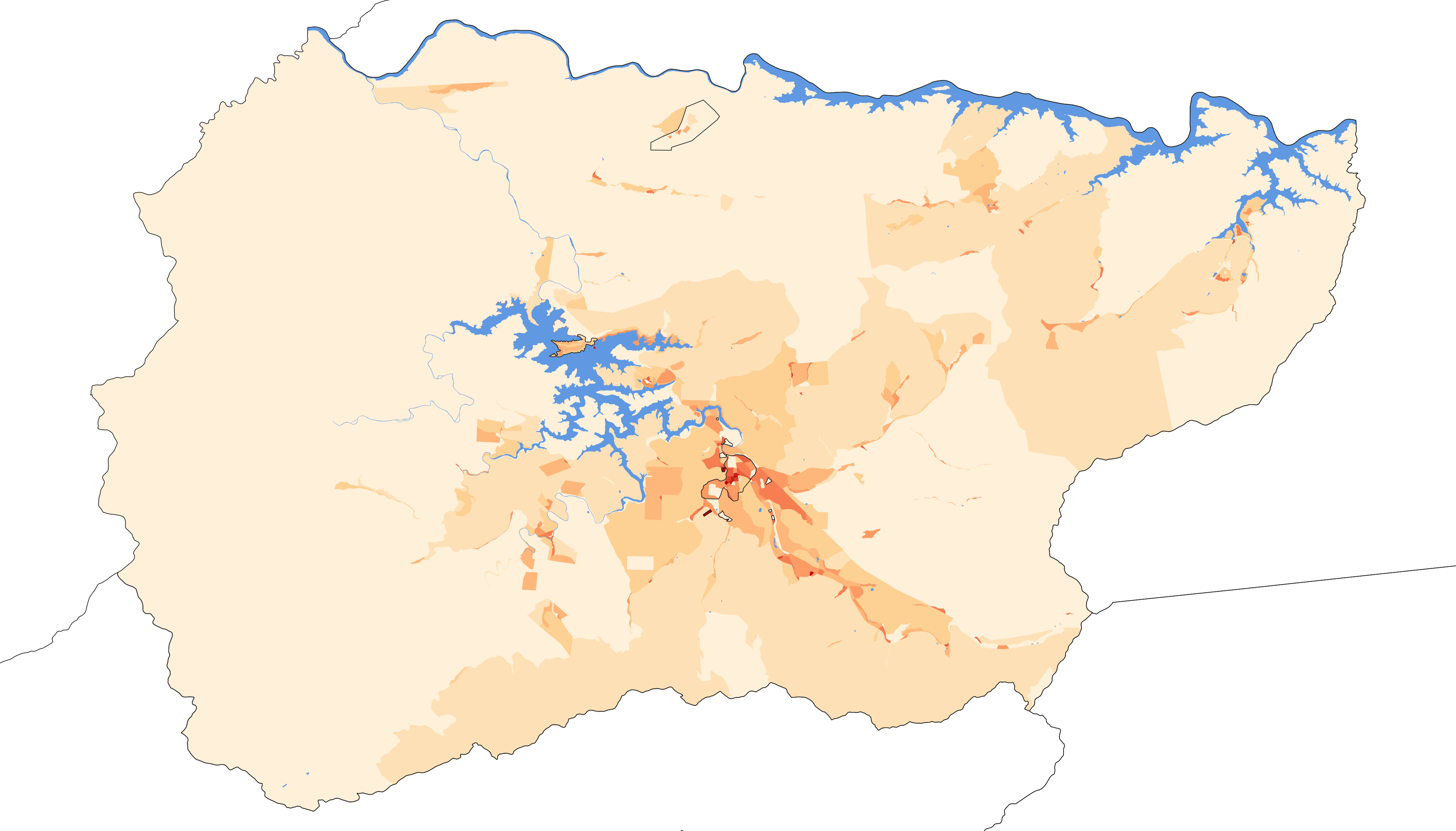
2020 population density of Graham County NC by census block

=== 2020 census ===
As of the 2020 census, the county had a population of 8,030 people and 2,178 families residing in the county.

The median age was 46.8 years. 20.7% of residents were under the age of 18 and 25.1% of residents were 65 years of age or older. For every 100 females there were 97.3 males, and for every 100 females age 18 and over there were 95.5 males age 18 and over.

The racial makeup of the county was 86.1% White, 0.6% Black or African American, 7.3% American Indian and Alaska Native, 0.3% Asian, 0.1% Native Hawaiian and Pacific Islander, 1.2% from some other race, and 4.4% from two or more races. Hispanic or Latino residents of any race comprised 2.7% of the population.

<0.1% of residents lived in urban areas, while 100.0% lived in rural areas.

There were 3,317 households in the county, of which 27.2% had children under the age of 18 living in them. Of all households, 51.1% were married-couple households, 18.7% were households with a male householder and no spouse or partner present, and 25.4% were households with a female householder and no spouse or partner present. About 29.4% of all households were made up of individuals and 16.3% had someone living alone who was 65 years of age or older.

There were 5,212 housing units, of which 36.4% were vacant. Among occupied housing units, 81.5% were owner-occupied and 18.5% were renter-occupied. The homeowner vacancy rate was 2.2% and the rental vacancy rate was 18.3%.

=== Racial and ethnic composition ===
Graham County, North Carolina – Racial and ethnic composition Note: the US Census treats Hispanic/Latino as an ethnic category. This table excludes Latinos from the racial categories and assigns them to a separate category. Hispanics/Latinos may be of any race.
Race / Ethnicity (NH = Non-Hispanic)	Pop 1980	Pop 1990	Pop 2000	Pop 2010	Pop 2020	% 1980	% 1990	% 2000	% 2010	% 2020
White alone (NH)	6,801	6,707	7,303	7,942	6,885	94.24%	93.20%	91.37%	89.63%	85.74%
Black or African American alone (NH)	1	1	15	17	46	0.01%	0.01%	0.19%	0.19%	0.57%
Native American or Alaska Native alone (NH)	374	453	541	538	570	5.18%	6.30%	6.77%	6.07%	7.10%
Asian alone (NH)	2	6	13	29	20	0.03%	0.08%	0.16%	0.33%	0.25%
Native Hawaiian or Pacific Islander alone (NH)	x	x	1	2	4	x	x	0.01%	0.02%	0.05%
Other race alone (NH)	0	0	0	0	4	0.00%	0.00%	0.00%	0.00%	0.05%
Mixed race or Multiracial (NH)	x	x	60	139	282	x	x	0.75%	1.57%	3.51%
Hispanic or Latino (any race)	39	29	60	194	219	0.54%	0.40%	0.75%	2.19%	2.73%
Total	7,217	7,196	7,993	8,861	8,030	100.00%	100.00%	100.00%	100.00%	100.00%

=== 2000 census ===
At the 2000 census, there were 7,993 people, 3,354 households, and 2,411 families residing in the county. The population density was 27 people per square mile (10 people/km^{2}). There were 5,084 housing units at an average density of 17 units per square mile (6.6 units/km^{2}). The racial makeup of the county was 91.91% White, 0.19% Black or African American, 6.84% Native American, 0.16% Asian, 0.01% Pacific Islander, 0.13% from other races, and 0.76% from two or more races. 0.75% of the population were Hispanic or Latino of any race. 27.6% were of American, 15.1% Irish, 12.7% English, 10.6% German and 5.1% Scots-Irish ancestry according to Census 2000. 97.7% spoke English and 1.3% Cherokee as their first language.

There were 3,354 households, out of which 27.10% had children under the age of 18 living with them, 60.80% were married couples living together, 8.40% had a female householder with no husband present, and 28.10% were non-families. 26.00% of all households were made up of individuals, and 12.30% had someone living alone who was 65 years of age or older. The average household size was 2.35 and the average family size was 2.82.

In the county, the population was spread out, with 22.00% under the age of 18, 7.30% from 18 to 24, 25.20% from 25 to 44, 27.50% from 45 to 64, and 18.00% who were 65 years of age or older. The median age was 42 years. For every 100 females there were 95.30 males. For every 100 females age 18 and over, there were 92.60 males.

The median income for a household in the county was $26,645, and the median income for a family was $32,750. Males had a median income of $24,207 versus $18,668 for females. The per capita income for the county was $14,237. About 14.40% of families and 19.50% of the population were below the poverty line, including 24.30% of those under age 18 and 20.40% of those age 65 or over.

== Law, government, and politics ==
=== Government ===
Graham County is governed by an elected five-member board of commissioners. The county is a member of the regional Southwestern Commission council of governments. In 2021, the county began allowing alcoholic beverages to be purchased within the county. It was the last dry county (in which alcohol sales are generally forbidden with only a few exceptions) in North Carolina.

United States presidential election results for Graham County, North Carolina
Year	Republican		Democratic		Third party(ies)	
Year	No.	%	No.	%	No.	%
1912	261	29.00%	416	46.22%	223	24.78%
1916	460	49.15%	476	50.85%	0	0.00%
1920	915	58.69%	644	41.31%	0	0.00%
1924	907	51.56%	841	47.81%	11	0.63%
1928	1,260	56.68%	963	43.32%	0	0.00%
1932	1,183	46.25%	1,364	53.32%	11	0.43%
1936	1,325	47.36%	1,473	52.64%	0	0.00%
1940	1,089	43.68%	1,404	56.32%	0	0.00%
1944	1,356	41.79%	1,889	58.21%	0	0.00%
1948	1,115	41.07%	1,527	56.24%	73	2.69%
1952	1,380	46.46%	1,590	53.54%	0	0.00%
1956	1,762	54.25%	1,486	45.75%	0	0.00%
1960	1,721	56.32%	1,335	43.68%	0	0.00%
1964	1,398	44.59%	1,737	55.41%	0	0.00%
1968	1,570	52.44%	1,061	35.44%	363	12.12%
1972	1,699	61.05%	1,057	37.98%	27	0.97%
1976	1,621	47.34%	1,791	52.31%	12	0.35%
1980	1,961	54.25%	1,608	44.48%	46	1.27%
1984	2,514	62.63%	1,494	37.22%	6	0.15%
1988	2,091	61.16%	1,313	38.40%	15	0.44%
1992	1,919	49.51%	1,551	40.02%	406	10.47%
1996	1,801	54.76%	1,210	36.79%	278	8.45%
2000	2,304	68.55%	1,006	29.93%	51	1.52%
2004	2,693	67.54%	1,272	31.90%	22	0.55%
2008	2,824	67.71%	1,265	30.33%	82	1.97%
2012	2,750	69.67%	1,119	28.35%	78	1.98%
2016	3,283	78.77%	768	18.43%	117	2.81%
2020	3,710	79.53%	905	19.40%	50	1.07%
2024	3,883	81.25%	839	17.56%	57	1.19%

=== Public safety ===
The Graham County Sheriff's Office protects the court and all county owned facilities, operates the jail, and provides patrol and detective services. Graham County Emergency Medical Services provide full-time paramedic level care to all of Graham County, and to a small portion of northwest Swain County. As there are no hospitals in Graham County, all patients are transported out of county for emergency care.

== Media ==
The Graham Star newspaper has been published weekly in Robbinsville since 1955. It faced competition from the Graham Sentinel until the Sentinel closed in 2012.

== Education ==
Graham County Schools includes Robbinsville Elementary School, Robbinsville Middle School, and Robbinsville High School. In 2026, Graham County broke ground on a new Robbinsville Elementary School.

== Communities ==
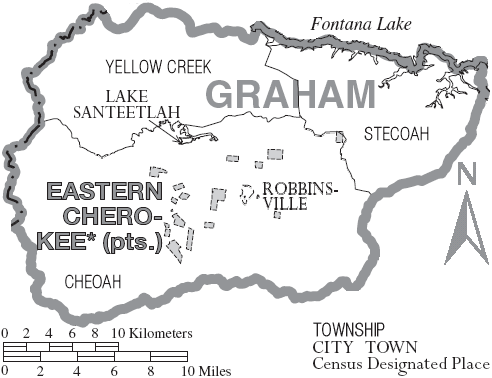
Map of Graham County with municipal and township labels

=== Towns ===
- Fontana Dam
- Lake Santeetlah
- Robbinsville (county seat and largest community)

=== Townships ===
- Cheoah
- Stecoah
- Yellow Creek

=== Unincorporated communities ===
Many smaller communities in Graham County are named for bodies of water, notable landscape features, or early settlers. Other unincorporated communities in Graham County include:

- Atoah
- Bear Creek Junction
- Cheoah
- Dentons
- Dry Creek
- Hidetown
- Jenkins Meadow
- Junction
- McGuires
- Meadow Branch
- Milltown
- Rymers Ferry
- Sawyers Creek
- Stecoah
- Sweetgum
- Tapoco (named for the Tallassee Power Company)
- Tulula (just south of Robbinsville; may have been named for a mythological Cherokee Indian)
- Tuskeegee
- Yellow Creek

== In popular culture ==
- Portions of the movie Nell (1994), starring Jodie Foster, were filmed near Robbinsville.
- Portions of the movie The Fugitive (1993), starring Harrison Ford, were filmed at Cheoah Dam.
- The historic 1927 silent film Stark Love was filmed in Graham County and featured local residents as actors.
- Some scenes from In Dreams (1999), starring Annette Bening and Robert Downey Jr., were filmed in the area around Fontana Village.

== See also ==
- List of counties in North Carolina
- National Register of Historic Places listings in Graham County, North Carolina
- USS Graham County (LST-1176)
