= Marble, North Carolina =

- Census-designated place
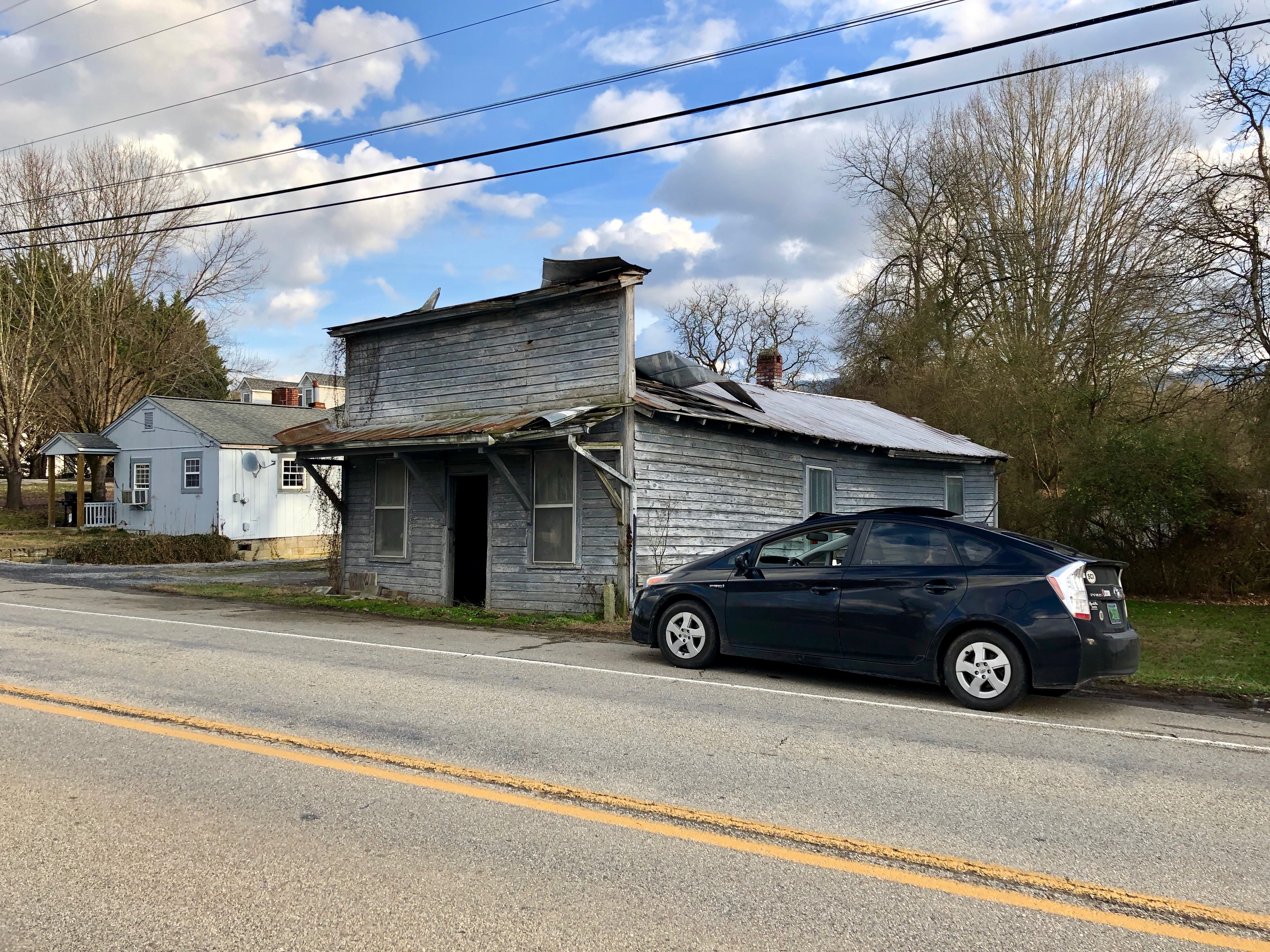

- Location within the state of North Carolina
- Coordinates: 35°10′37″N 83°58′35″W
- Country: United States
- State: North Carolina
- County: Cherokee County, North Carolina

Area
  - Total: 1.10 sq mi (2.84 km^{2})
  - Land: 1.10 sq mi (2.84 km^{2})
  - Water: 0 sq mi (0.00 km^{2})
- Elevation: 1,680 ft (510 m)

Population (2020)
  - Total: 278
  - Density: 253.5/sq mi (97.89/km^{2})
- Time zone: UTC-5 (Eastern (EST))
  - Summer (DST): UTC-4 (EDT)
- ZIP codes: 28905
- Area code: 828
- FIPS code: 37-41220
- GNIS feature ID: 2628642

Marble is an unincorporated community and census-designated place (CDP) in Cherokee County, North Carolina, United States. As of the 2020 census, Marble had a population of 278.

== History ==
The original name of the Marble community is Marble Springs. The name was later shortened to Marble with the baptist church on Marble Road still bearing the original name. Marble got its name from various marble quarries in the community. The vast majority of all marble quarried in the communty was used as cemetery headstones across nine states. The quarries opened in 1902 and produced Regal Blue and Confederate Gray shades which were shipped on the Southern Railway's Murphy Branch. The Cherokee County Courthouse, built in 1926, was the first building made of marble from the community. It is one of few county courthouses in the U.S. constructed entirely of marble. Marble from the community was also used to build Fontana Dam, the tallest dam in the Eastern United States and the fourth-tallest dam in the world at the time of its construction. By 1934, the Columbia Marble Company in Marble was one of the largest marble plants in the south. By 1946, all but one quarry in the community had closed due to excessive jointing and heavy water flow. Currently, none are functioning, and all have filled with water.

Marble’s post office opened in 1881. Marble Elementary School was built in 1955. The school was part of the Andrews City School District. In the 1960s, American Thread built a 250,000-square-foot industrial plant along the railroad in Marble. Cherokee County's only animal shelter, Valley River Humane Society, was founded in Marble in 1969. It moved to a new, 3,700-square-foot facility on US 74 in 1999. Marble's town charter was deactivated by the North Carolina state legislature in 1971 as the town had effectively closed down. Nonprofit manufacturer Industrial Opportunities Inc. was established at the Marble Activity Center in 1974. A fire station was built in Marble around 1975. The Marble Community Center was built in 1976. A four-lane highway between Murphy and Andrews was built through Marble around 1977.

After Marble Elementary closed in 2017, the nine-acre campus housed The Oaks Academy until the academy moved to Peachtree in 2023, leaving the current building up for sale. The current building was said to be built around 1992, but aerial photos show the current building in 1984, and topographic maps show the building outline as early as 1975. A sign outside of Marble Elementary shows the two years in which the school was originally built (1955-1956). The Cherokee County Landfill opened in Marble in 1998.

Marble's American Thread factory closed in 2015, cutting 382 jobs. The building reopened as a Core Scientific bitcoin mine in the early 2020s. In 2024, Core Scientific partnered with CoreWeave to transition the facility into an artificial intelligence processing plant as part of one of the world's largest supercomputers.

== Law enforcement ==
Marble is served by the town of Andrews Police Department. According to the 2012 Crime Rate Index, Marble was rated a rape crime risk of 131 and a murder crime risk of 111. Marble also scored 81 for vehicle theft and 58 for larceny. All scores are compared to a national average of 100. North Carolina average is 103.

== Demographics ==
Historical population
Census	Pop.	Note	%±
2010	321		—
2020	278		−13.4%
U.S. Decennial Census

Marble first appeared as a census designated place in the 2010 U.S. census.

=== Racial and ethnic composition ===
Marble CDP, North Carolina – Racial and ethnic composition Note: the US Census treats Hispanic/Latino as an ethnic category. This table excludes Latinos from the racial categories and assigns them to a separate category. Hispanics/Latinos may be of any race.
Race / Ethnicity (NH = Non-Hispanic)	Pop 2010	Pop 2020	% 2010	% 2020
White alone (NH)	311	248	96.88%	89.21%
Black or African American alone (NH)	0	3	0.00%	1.08%
Native American or Alaska Native alone (NH)	6	0	1.87%	0.00%
Asian alone (NH)	0	1	0.00%	0.36%
Native Hawaiian or Pacific Islander alone (NH)	0	0	0.00%	0.00%
Other race alone (NH)	0	0	0.00%	0.00%
Mixed race or Multiracial (NH)	2	15	0.62%	5.40%
Hispanic or Latino (any race)	2	11	0.62%	3.96%
Total	321	278	100.00%	100.00%

=== 2010 census ===
As of the 2010 Census, there were 321 people, of which 162 were male and 159 were female. The 2010 population density was 293 people per square mile.

== Economy ==
=== Occupations ===
19.1% of individuals over the age of 16, are employed in management or professional industries. 19.1% are employed in the service industry, 16.9% are employed in sales or office industries, 14.9% are employed in construction, extraction and maintenance while the remaining 28.3% are employed in production and transportation.

As of 2000, 12.3% of people were below the poverty line.

=== Household income ===
7.5% make less than $10,000 per year. 11.4% make between $10,000 and $14,999. 27.3% make between $15,000 and $24,999 per year. 14.2% make between $50,000 and $74,999 per year and 24.5% make between $35,000 and $49,999 per year. 14.2% make between $50,000 and $74,999 per year while the remaining 3.6% make over $75,000 per year.

As of 2000, 1.7% of Marble individuals were unemployed, while median household income was $28,553.

== Education ==
=== Schools and colleges ===
Marble is in close proximity to Tri-County Community College which has campuses in Peachtree, Robbinsville, and Marble.

=== Public education ===
The public school system (Cherokee County Schools) is run by the Cherokee County Board of Education. As of 2024, the Cherokee County Schools Central Office is located at the former elementary school in Marble.

Children in Marble attended Marble Elementary School at 2230 Airport Road until 2017. This school covered grades pre-K to 5th grade and was given a GreatSchools rating of 3/10.

Since 2017 students from Marble attend Andrews Elementary, Middle and High School in the town of Andrews. As of 2016, the schools both scored 4/10 on GreatSchools.

== Transportation ==
=== Highways ===
Marble sits on US 19/129/74, which runs northeast-southwest between Andrews and Murphy. Airport Road (SR 1428) runs through Marble and was US 19 until 1979. The road ends near Murphy, and in Andrews at the west entrance. Slow Creek Road (141) runs south toward Erlanger Western Carolina Hospital in Peachtree.

=== Airport ===
Western Carolina Regional Airport (ICAO: KRHP, FAA LID: RHP), known locally as the Murphy Airport, Andrews Airport, or Andrews-Murphy Airport, is located approximately 4.5 miles (7.2 km) east of Marble.

== Geography ==
=== Topography ===
Marble is located in the southeastern United States in the far western portion of North Carolina, approximately halfway between Atlanta, Georgia and Knoxville, Tennessee. The location in the Blue Ridge Mountains has helped the community retain a rural character, surrounded by wildlife such as bear, deer, and recently reintroduced elk.

According to the United States Census Bureau, the Marble CDP has a total area of 1.1 square miles (2.8 km^{2}), all land.

=== Climate ===
Marble has a humid subtropical climate, (Cfa) according to the Köppen classification, with hot, humid summers and mild, but occasionally cold winters by the standards of the southern United States.

July highs average 85 °F (29 °C) or above, and lows average 55 °F (12.8 °C). Infrequently, temperatures can even exceed 100 °F (38 °C). January is the coldest month, with an average high of 48 °F (9 °C), and low of 33 °F (.6 °C).

Like the rest of the southeastern U.S., Marble receives abundant rainfall, which is relatively evenly distributed throughout the year. Average annual rainfall is 55.9 inches (1,420 mm). Blizzards are rare but possible; one nicknamed the 1993 Storm of the Century hit the entire Eastern United States in March 1993.

Climate Data for Marble

Month	Jan	Feb	Mar	Apr	May	Jun	Jul	Aug	Sep	Oct	Nov	Dec
Average High Fº(Cº)	47.8 (8.8)	52.2 (11.2)	61.1 (16.2)	69.9 (21.0)	77.3 (25.2)	83.3 (28.5)	85.8 (29.9)	85.6 (29.8)	80.7 (27.0)	71.8 (22.1)	61.9 (16.5)	51.4 (10.8)
Average Low Fº(Cº)	24.1 (-4.4)	26.1 (-3.3)	32.9 (0.5)	39.9 (4.4)	49.1 (9.5)	56.8 (13.8)	61.4 (16.3)	60.9 (16)	54.8 (12.7)	41.6 (5.3)	34.2 (1.2)	26.8 (-2.9)
Precipitation Inches(mm)	5.2 (132)	5.2 (132)	6.0 (152.4)	4.6 (116.8)	4.6 (116.8)	4.2 (106.7)	5.5 (139.7)	4.1 (121.9)	3.7 (94.0)	3.3 (83.2)	4.1 (104.1)	4.8 (121.9)

== Culture ==
=== Local festivals and celebrations ===
The bi-annual Celebration of Flight air show, located at the Andrews-Murphy Airport 4 miles (6 km) northeast of Marble, is a presentation of vintage and modern aircraft.

=== Religion ===
Historically, religion has been a very important part of Appalachian life. Christianity is predominant in Marble and the surrounding communities. Baptist Christian faiths are well represented here. Some local churches are Marble Springs Baptist Church, Emanuel Baptist Church, Fair-view Church and Kingdom Hall-Jehovah's Witness.

== Media ==
Marble and the surrounding area are served by a few local television stations, numerous local radio stations that broadcast several genres of music, sports, news and talk radio, plus three local newspapers.

A local television station is W31AN (Channel 31) based in Murphy.

Marble is served by eight local radio stations. WCVP-AM (600), WCNG-FM (102.7), and WKRK-AM (1320) are based in Murphy. WCVP-FM (95.9) is in Robbinsville, and WFSC-AM (1050), WPFJ-AM (1480), WFQS-FM (91.3), and WNCC (96.7) are based in Franklin.

The only newspaper in Cherokee County is the Cherokee Scout, which is based in Murphy.

== Notable people ==
- Loyal Jones, folklorist and writer
- Lloyd R. Welch, fourth Principal Chief of the Eastern Band of Cherokee Indians
- Roger West, local politician

== Nearby communities ==
- Andrews (6 miles (10 km) northeast)
- Murphy (10 miles (16 km) southwest)
