= Voyles =

Voyles is an English surname, of Welsh origin. It is a variant of Voyle. Notable people with the surname include:

- Brad Voyles (born 1976), American baseball player
- Carl M. Voyles (1898–1982), American football coach
- Phil Voyles (1900–1972), American baseball player
- Scott Voyles (born 1980), American conductor
