= WCVP =

WCVP may refer to:

- WCVP (AM), a radio station (600 AM) licensed to Murphy, North Carolina, United States
- WCVP-FM, a radio station (95.9 FM) licensed to Robbinsville, North Carolina, United States
