= Cherokee County Courthouse (North Carolina) =

- U.S. National Register of Historic Places
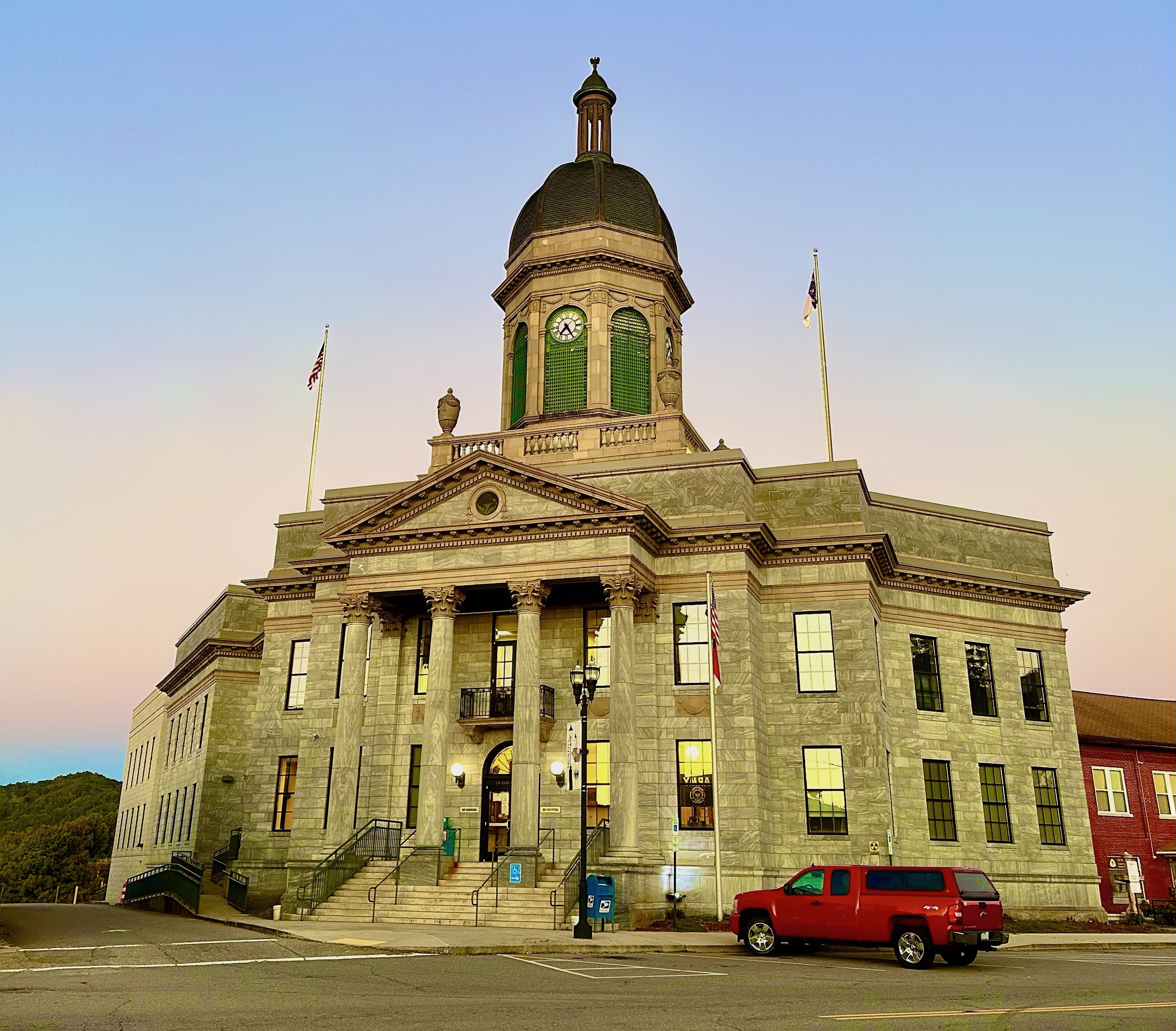
- Cherokee County Courthouse from Peachtree Street, October 2022

- Location within North Carolina Location within the United States
- Interactive map showing the location of Cherokee County Courthouse
- Location: Peachtree St and Bill Hughes Ave, Murphy, North Carolina
- Coordinates: 35°5′12″N 84°1′59″W
- Area: less than one acre
- Built: 1926
- Architect: James J. Baldwin
- Architectural style: Classical Revival
- MPS: North Carolina County Courthouses TR
- NRHP reference No.: 79001692
- Added to NRHP: May 10, 1979

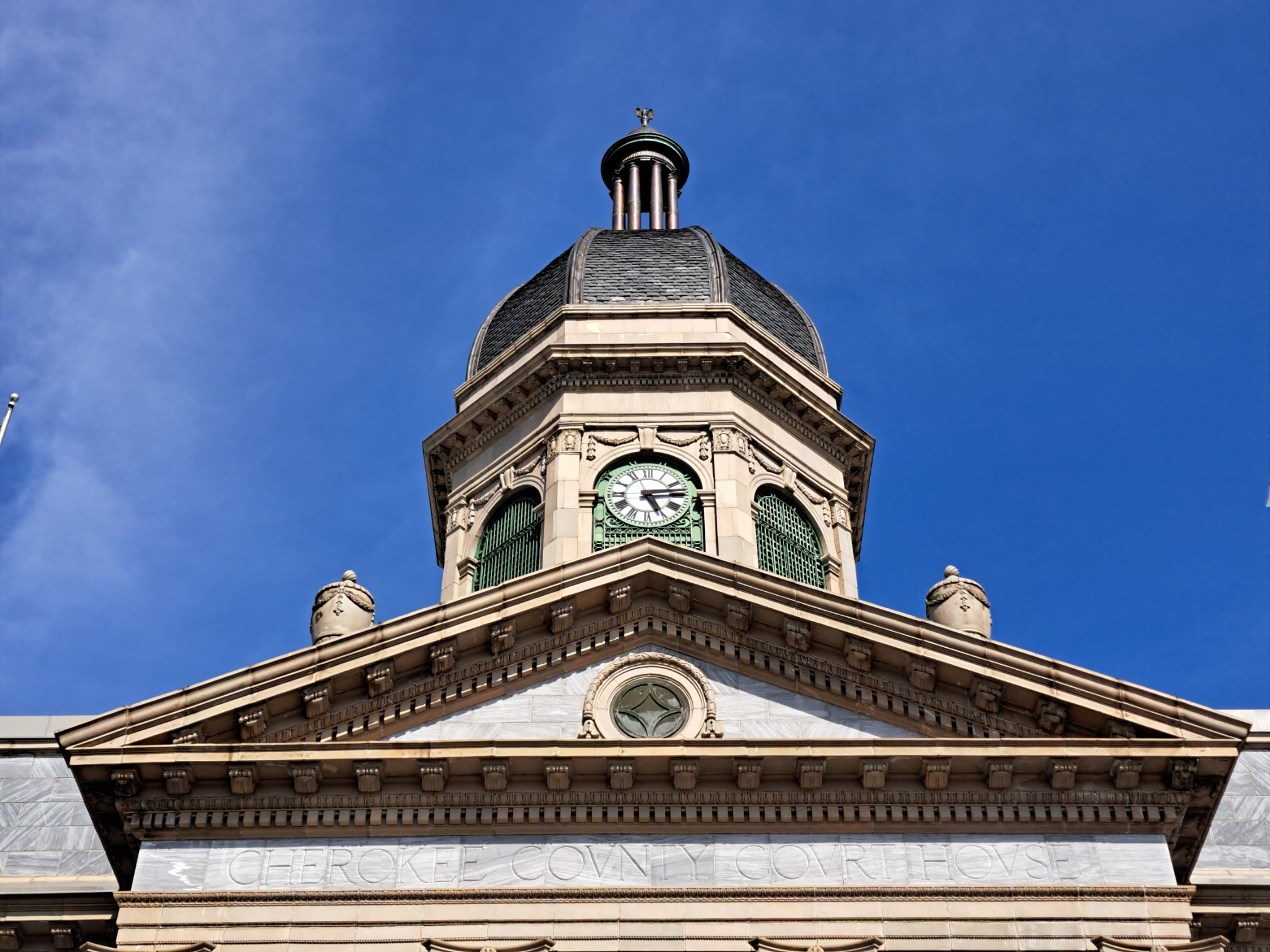
Above the entrance to the courthouse.

The Cherokee County Courthouse is a historic courthouse in Murphy, North Carolina, United States, the county seat of Cherokee County, that is listed on the National Register of Historic Places (NRHP).

== Description ==
The courthouse is located at the corner of Bill Hughes Avenue and Peachtree Street. The Classical Revival building, built in 1926 to a design by James J. Baldwin, was the second built on the site. The prior courthouse on the site burned twice, but after the second fire was not salvageable. The blue marble-faced two story building has a five-bay diagonal section facing the roadway that forms its entrance. It has a four-columned Corinthian Greek portico and is topped by a monumental cupola which rises 132 feet (40 m) above the structure. The floors are marble. The courthouse is one of only a few in the United States built from marble quarried in its own county. The building’s interior, especially its courtroom, has retained much of its original woodwork and stone styling.

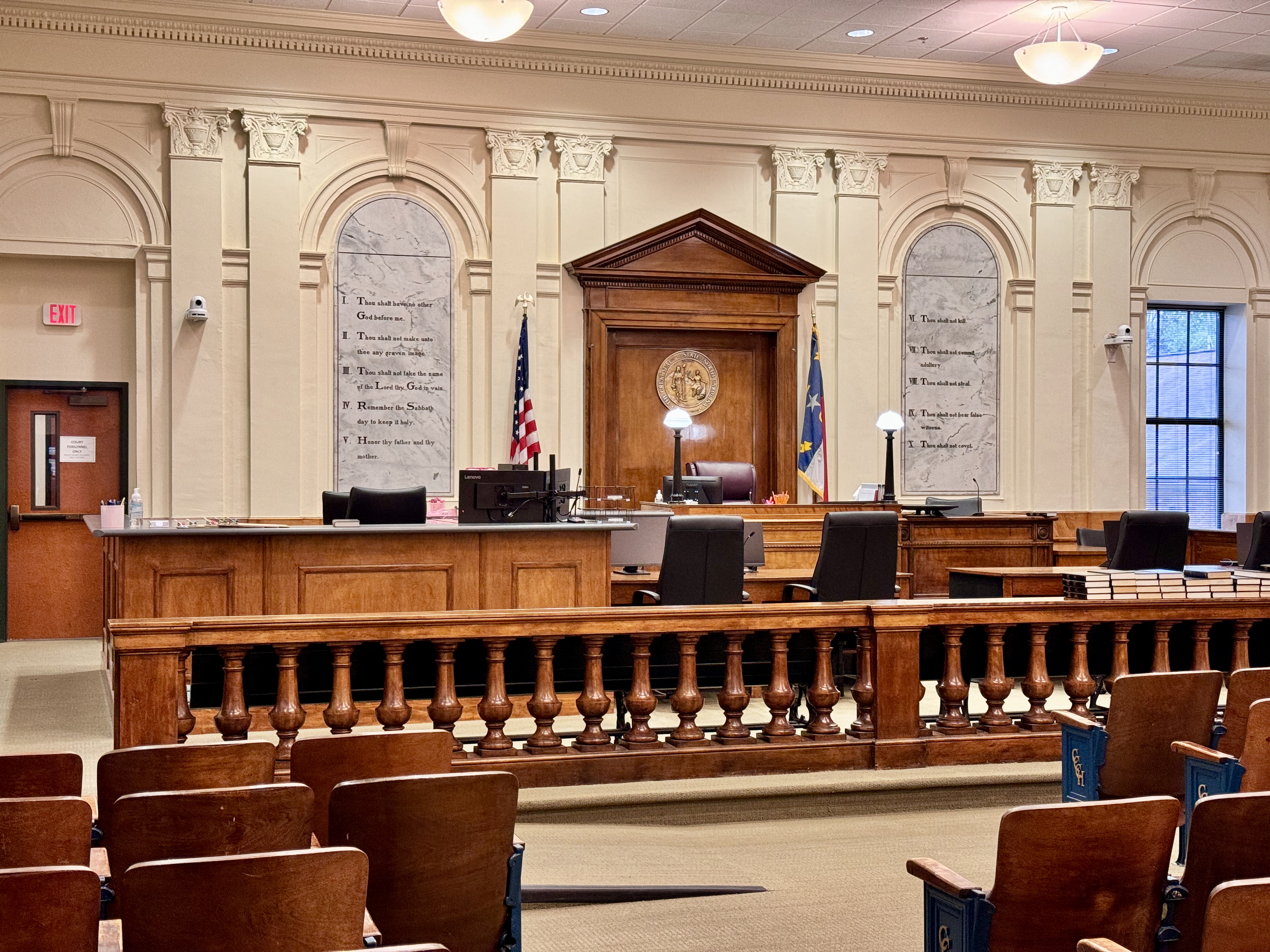
A courtroom at the Cherokee County Courthouse

== History ==
Cherokee County has a list of former courthouses either destroyed by fire or replaced by improved models. The first courts in the county were held at Fort Butler, which was constructed as a holding area for the Cherokee Native Americans during the Trail of Tears. In 1844 Archibald Russell Spence Hunter, a prominent merchant and the first postmaster in the area, had the first brick courthouse constructed on the current public square.

Right after the Civil War ended, Murphy’s courthouse was burned down on May 4, 1865, by the 3rd North Carolina Mounted Infantry under the command of Union Col. George Washington Kirk. Kirk did not yet know of the Confederacy’s surrender. Some of the raiders reportedly had pending criminal cases stored inside the courthouse.

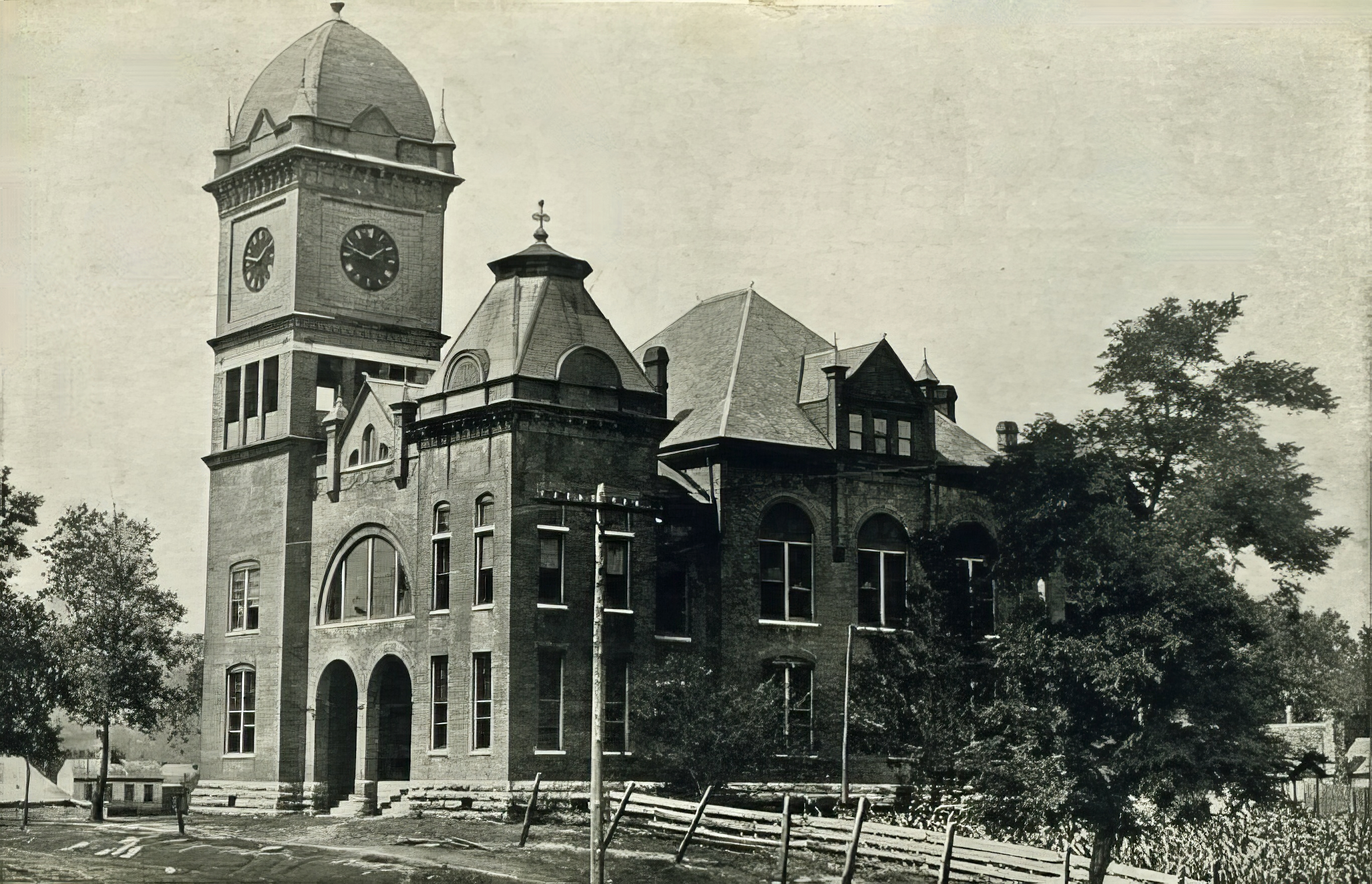
Cherokee County's fourth courthouse stood between 1892 and 1895

Murphy’s third courthouse was constructed in 1868 by reusing the brick from the first courthouse. It was a square, two-story building that the county quickly outgrew. In 1892, a fourth, larger courthouse was built on the site of the current marble courthouse at the corner of Central and Peachtree streets, down the road from the traditional public square where previous courthouses sat. It was also constructed of brick, had a clock tower, offices on the first floor, a courtroom on the second floor, and fireproof vaults. On December 12, 1895, an accidental fire burned much of the building. An inspection determined the remaining walls were sturdy enough to restore, and the rebuilt courthouse opened in 1896.

On January 16, 1926, the courthouse was again destroyed by fire. An investigator concluded a janitor accidentally started the fire after lighting a match in the ladies’ room to look for supplies. The custodian denied that and said he instead found the flames in a supply closet. Bricks salvaged from the fire were in 1927 used to build the chimney for the John C. Campbell Folk School's iconic Community Room. After three courthouse fires, county commissioners decided to build the next building on the same site using an inflammable material: blue marble. The blue marble was brought from Regal marble quarry in the town of Marble less than 10 miles (16 km) away. It was constructed at a cost of $256,000 and was dedicated on November 12, 1927. The courthouse was the first building made of marble from Marble. Though local quarries had been operating for two dozen years, they mainly produced headstones.

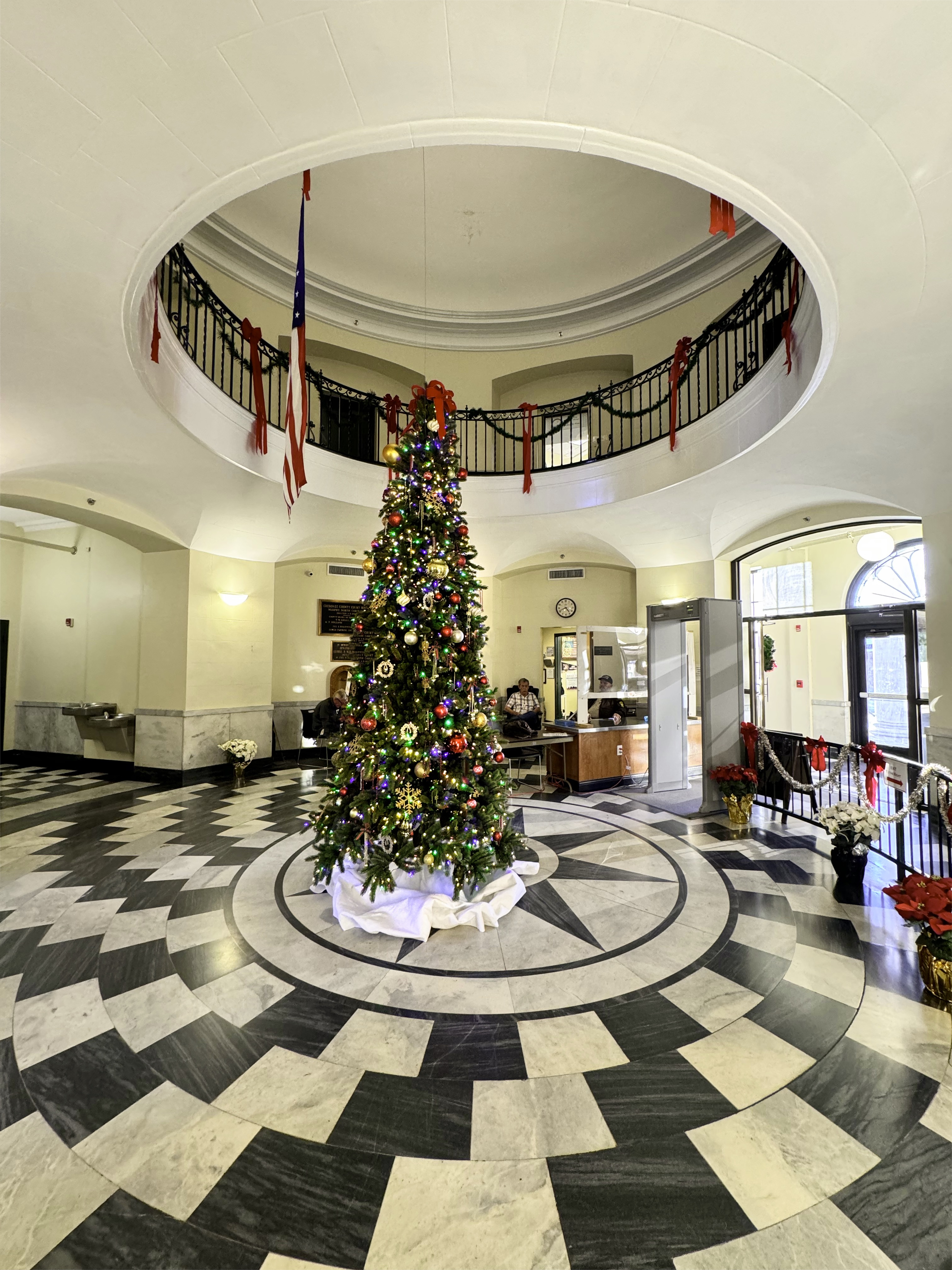
The rotunda inside the Cherokee County Courthouse

On September 7, 1963, Cherokee County Sheriff Claude Anderson was shot three times at the courthouse and was critically wounded. A widespread manhunt was launched. The sheriff’s cousin Milt Anderson surrendered hours later. Claude Anderson survived and continued to serve as sheriff for years.

The courthouse served as an overnight shelter for residents when a deadly F4 tornado devastated the Murphy area during the 1974 Super Outbreak. The courthouse was listed on the NRHP May 10, 1979. In 2013 the courthouse underwent a $9 million renovation and expansion. The old Cherokee County Jail built in 1922 was demolished in 2008 to make room for the new addition. The courthouse’s interior was modernized. Additional court rooms were added as well as new offices in a newly-constructed section on the rear of the building. The courthouse’s distinctive marble was not used on exterior walls in the expansion. The original quarry had long since closed.

In 2017 the copper lantern which sits atop the cupola was removed to make crucial repairs to the lantern. It was in danger of collapsing in on itself due to structural deterioration over the years as well as being riddled with bullet holes. The lantern was restored locally with help from the Cherokee County Board of Commissioners, the Cherokee County Maintenance Department, Tri-County Community College Welding Department, as well as numerous other skilled local residents. After its repair, the lantern was put back in place in 2018.

Murphy High School’s prom has been held at the courthouse multiple times.

== See also ==
- National Register of Historic Places listings in Cherokee County, North Carolina
- List of county courthouses in North Carolina
