= WKRK =

WKRK may refer to:

- WKRK (AM), a radio station (1320 AM) licensed to Murphy, North Carolina, United States
- WKRK-FM, a radio station (92.3 FM) licensed to Cleveland Heights, Ohio, United States
- WXYT-FM, a radio station (97.1 FM) licensed to Detroit, Michigan, United States, which held the call sign WKRK-FM from June 1997 to October 2007
