= WCNG =

- Murphy, North Carolina; United States
- Broadcast area: Andrews, North Carolina; Hayesville, North Carolina
- Frequency: 102.7 MHz
- Branding: G102.7

Programming
- Format: Contemporary hit radio
- Affiliations: AP Radio

Ownership
- Owner: Cherokee Broadcasting Co., Inc.
- Sister stations: WCVP, WCVP-FM

History
- First air date: October 23, 1990

Technical information
- Licensing authority: FCC
- Facility ID: 10699
- Class: A
- ERP: 3,000 watts
- HAAT: 72 meters
- Transmitter coordinates: 35°4′0.00″N 83°59′58.00″W
- Translators: 101.3 W267BC (Blairsville, GA)

Links
- Public license information: Public file; LMS

WCNG (102.7 FM) is a radio station broadcasting a contemporary hit radio format. Licensed to Murphy, North Carolina, United States, the station is currently owned by Cherokee Broadcasting Co., Inc. and features programming from AP Radio.

The station is an affiliate of the Atlanta Braves radio network, the largest radio affiliate network in Major League Baseball.

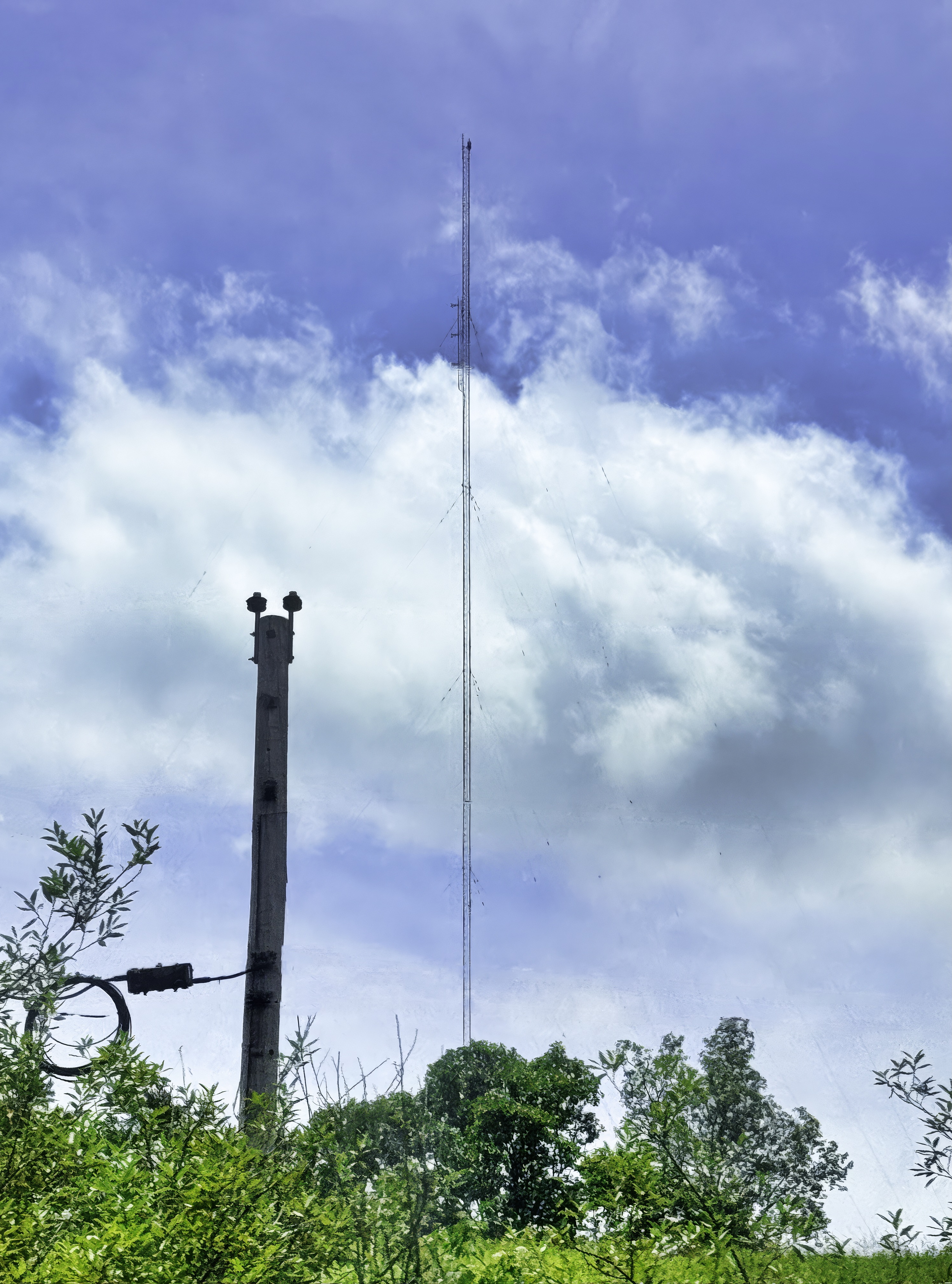
The radio tower for WCNG
