= Voyle =

Voyle is both a given name and a surname. The origin of the name is from the Welsh language. It was originally moel, meaning bald, but became mutated (a change that happens in the Welsh language under certain grammatical rules, in this instance the soft mutation, from moel to foel.) It can refer to a person or a land feature such as the poorly vegetated top of a round hill. The name is often mis-spelt on census returns and the like, as it became anglicised. As the Welsh letter f is sounded as v then the name became spelled as the following variants;

Voil, Voel, Voyl, Voyle and even Voyles.

The name tended to be concentrated in Pembrokeshire and other areas of South Wales until recent times.

It may refer to:

- Mike Voyle (born 1970), Welsh rugby union player
- Voyle Gilmore (1912–1979), American record producer and music arranger

== See also ==
- Voyles
