= Shooting of Jason Harley Kloepfer =

2022 police shooting in North Carolina, United States

Jason Harley Kloepfer, a 41-year-old man, was shot on December 13, 2022, by the Eastern Band of Cherokee Indian Police SWAT Team at Kloepfer's home in Murphy, North Carolina, United States. Kloepfer survived and in January 2023 released surveillance video from inside his home that showed events that differed from the initial account of the shooting given by the Cherokee County Sheriff's Office, which claimed that Kloepfer engaged in a "verbal altercation with officers" and "confronted officers". The video showed that Kloepfer exited his house with his arms raised as per police's instructions, while he was holding onto a cigarette and a camera-equipped robot which police had thrown into his home; Kloepfer was shot around four seconds later, when his arms were still raised. Within hours of the shooting, Kloepfer was charged with communicating threats, as well as resist, obstruct and delay, but these charges were dropped by March 2023. Special prosecutor Lance Sigmon in December 2023 declined to file criminal charges against police involved in the incident; no specific details for Sigmon's decision were publicized. Kloepfer has filed a federal lawsuit against officers from both police departments.

== Shooting ==
911 call records showed that there were 13 calls from May 2020 to September 2022 related to Jason Harley Kloepfer's residence, with the records stating that the calls were regarding incidents including "welfare check", "assault", "disturbance" and "fireworks".

On December 12, 2022, just before 11.20 p.m., a person called 911, claiming to be Kloepfer's neighbor. The caller indicated that Kloepfer "about an hour ago, started shooting off fireworks, screaming, yelling, going to kill everyone in the neighborhood ... he's discharging a firearm ... They've been over there screaming, yelling and fighting for the last 45 minutes". The caller then said: "I just heard his wife screaming 'stop it,' and then a bunch of shots went off and now I can’t hear her over there at all." The caller then quotes his neighbor as saying: "Send the police, I'll get them too."

Around 11.20 p.m. on December 12, three Cherokee County deputies arrived at Kloepfer's home, and are heard saying: "We haven’t been able to make contact with anybody at this residence ... There's a detached garage with music blaring in the garage. We can’t get anybody to come to the door at the garage either." The officers referenced seeing a bullet and security cameras at Kloepfer's home. The SWAT team of the Eastern Band of the Cherokee Indian Police Department was summoned around 12.20 a.m. on December 13 to handle a potential hostage situation. A search warrant for Kloepfer's home was approved around 2.15 a.m. According to Kloepfer's later lawsuit, just before 2 a.m. of the night of the incident, an officer visited the neighbor to view her video of the complained behaviour; the lawsuit alleges that the video's only clear dialogue was a woman’s voice saying "stop" four times, but the video did not discernable show Kloepfer, his wife, or gunfire.

After the Cherokee Indian Police Department's SWAT Team arrived at Kloepfer's home, surveillance footage from the inside of Kloepfer's house, starting at 4.54 a.m. on December 13, showed police throwing a robot with a light and cameras into Kloepfer's home. The robot starts to shine a light around the home; two minutes later, a light is shone into Kloepfer's bedroom, and this appears to wake Kloepfer and his wife Ali, who says: "What’s going on?" Both call out: "Hello?" A police officer says through a loudspeaker: "Jason ... Step outside ... Come outside, Jason ... Step outside the door onto the deck and show us your hands. Jason, we just want to talk to you. Come outside." While the officer is speaking, Kloepfer picks up the police's robot.

At 4.57 a.m. and 16 seconds, Kloepfer opens the door to his home, unarmed and with his hands in the air; he is holding a cigarette and the police's robot. Behind Kloepfer is his wife, whose hands are also in the air. Officers shout for Kloepfer to hold up his hands; at 4.57 a.m. and 20 seconds, Kloepfer is shot multiple times while he was holding up his hands. He fell to the floor, crying out: "I’m shot!" The police continued shooting even after Kloepfer had fallen to the floor.

Following the shooting, Kloepfer's wife yells at officers: "What the hell, he's shot, what the hell did you do?!" Officers order Kloepfer and his wife to leave the home. While Kloepfer's wife follows the officers' orders to leave the home, both she and Kloepfer protest that he cannot do that because of his bullet wounds. On the floor, Kloepfer drags himself towards the door, protesting: "I don’t have a gun! I didn’t have a gun!" He sticks his hands out of the door frame. At 4.58 a.m, officers enter Kloepfer's home and step over Kloepfer, who still has his hands up. After an initial check of the home, one officer at 4.59 a.m informs another officer to "start working on" Kloepfer. Kloepfer is removed from his home. Three officers re-enter the home at 5 a.m, one shouts: "Fuck bro, fuck", while another says: “Hey, cameras, cameras!"

Kloepfer was brought to a hospital and survived the shooting. He subsequently uploaded photos online showing bullet wounds at his chest, abdomen and arm.

== Aftermath ==
=== Police actions and Kloepfer's charges ===
At 11.42 a.m on December 13, the Cherokee County Sheriff's Office issued a press release stating that after a 911 call regarding multiple gunshots at a residence, police responded to the scene. The press release stated that deputies were "unsuccessful" in contacting the suspect, so the Cherokee County Sheriff’s Office obtained a search warrant, and called in the Cherokee Indian Police Department SWAT Team due to "an armed suspect present and the potential for a hostage situation".

The press release went on to say that the Cherokee Indian Police SWAT Team shot Kloepfer after Kloepfer "engaged in a verbal altercation with officers and emerged from a camper trailer and confronted officers".

The press release stated that Kloepfer received two charges, the first being communicating threats, the second being resist, obstruct and delay, and that more charges were possible, according to the press release. Kloepfer was scheduled to appear in court on March 9. By March 1, the charges against Kloepfer had been dropped. According to the local dismissal document, the charge of making threats was dropped "at the request of the prosecuting witness", while the charge of resisting orders was dropped as "the charging document does not list the type of orders given and under what circumstances that this would be a duty of their office".

The Eastern Band of Cherokee Indians Tribal Council in March 2023 tabled, and on April 6, 2023, approved a request from Cherokee Indian Police Department Chief Carla Neadeau to strip Cherokee Indian Police car and body camera videos of public record status. On April 25, 2023, the Eastern Band of Cherokee Indians Chief Richard Sneed signed the proposed change into law, meaning that court action would be needed before such footage could be published.

After media outlets requested police footage of the shooting, the Cherokee County Sheriff's Office refused to provide body camera footage, while Cherokee Indian Police Department Chief Carla Neadeau on April 24, 2023 responded: "The Tribe does not have any video or audio recordings responsive to your request."

=== Kloepfer's release of surveillance footage ===
WLOS reported in January 2023 that surveillance footage, published by Kloepfer, showing the inside of Kloepfer's house, "appears to show a conflicting account of the event" when compared to the Cherokee County Sheriff's Office's press release. The Cherokee Scout agrees that "key details" of the press release seem to be contradicted. RTL.hu reported that the surveillance footage showed Kloepfer obeying police commands, in contrast to the press release's claim that Kloepfer confronted police. Skai Group agreed that Kloepfer was shot despite appearing to have complied with police orders. The Independent reported that the surveillance footage did not show Kloepfer engaging in a "verbal altercation" or confronting police, as claimed in the press release.

Cherokee County Sheriff Dustin Smith later stated that the press release was published without him having personal knowledge of what had happened, and the press release "relied on information provided to us from the Cherokee Indian Police Department". However, Smoky Mountain News reported that multiple Cherokee County deputies and investigators were at the scene during the shooting, and also reported that while Sheriff Smith was initially at his office that night, a later radio call after the shooting sees another officer telling Smith that a tribal police unit is "wanting to follow you back to" the sheriff's office, where "they could unwind a little bit", to which Smith responds: "I'll take care of it." A lawsuit by Kloepfer alleges that Sheriff Smith was on the scene at the time of the shooting.

Sheriff Smith also stated that the aim of the press release "was not to comment on the subsequent criminal investigation, which remains ongoing, but rather to update the public on a dangerous situation." Smith added that he did not see video of the shooting until January 18, 2023. Smith used the post to advocate for the creation for a SWAT team for Cherokee County.

In March 2023, Kloepfer's lawyer said that Kloepfer had even more video footage of the incident.

=== Reactions ===
On January 20, 2023, Kloepfer stated that he was "physically doing better", but he and his wife were mentally "not so good", "out of state for fear of our lives since I got out the hospital". He described the incident as a "horrible nightmare" and called his charges "completely wrong".

Video of the shooting received international attention. The surveillance footage has circulated online, including on YouTube, with one video receiving almost 100,000 views by the end of January 2023. Greek media outlet To Vima described the incident as another scandal of police brutality in the United States, and noted social media outrage over the police's use of force. Hungarian media outlet RTL.hu opined that Kloepfer's wife was lucky not to be shot in this incident.

=== Investigation into law enforcement ===
The North Carolina State Bureau of Investigation in December 2022 started an investigation into the shooting. The investigation continued past June 2023. The bureau does not make its investigation results public, but sends them to a district attorney, who will decide whether to file charges against any officers.

However, on March 27, 2023, the Cherokee County District Attorney, Ashley Welch, sought to recuse from the case, citing that she and an assistant district attorney may be witnesses for the investigation, as they were contacted by a Cherokee County Sheriff's Office deputy hours after the shooting. As the "allegations in this case involve potential crimes committed by a government official", Welch requested the Office of the North Carolina Attorney General (Josh Stein) to step in.

In November 2023, the North Carolina State Bureau of Investigation finished its investigation, passing its findings to a special prosecutor. In February 2024, Kimberly Spahos, executive director of North Carolina's Conference of District Attorneys, revealed that special prosecutor Lance Sigmon in December 2023 declined to file any criminal charges against law enforcement officers involved in the raid; Spahos did not give specific reasons for Sigmon's decision.

=== Lawsuit ===
Kloepfer in June 2023 filed a federal lawsuit in the United States District Court for the Western District of North Carolina against members of the Cherokee County Sheriff’s Department and the Eastern Band of Cherokee Indian Police Department, amongst others. Kloepfer's lawsuit alleges 25 counts of action, including excessive use of force, trespassing, gross negligence, and making false reports.

The defendants in August 2023 responded to Kloepfer's lawsuit, claiming that only three officers, Nathan Messer, Neil Ferguson and Chris Harris from the Cherokee Indian Police Department, shot at Kloepfer because they thought Kloepfer was wielding a weapon. The three officers stated that when Kloepfer fell to the floor after they shot at him, they thought that Kloepfer had "went back into the camper to take up a secure position inside", and hence at least one officer continued to shoot. The defendants stated some CIPD SWAT officers saw Kloepfer’s actions through the drone's video, and that one CIPD SWAT officers described some of Kloepfer’s actions over the microphone, but rejected the claim that all SWAT officers heard this description.

While Section 15-3 of the Cherokee Code mandates that "the requesting agency" should command officers who were from other agencies, the Cherokee Indian Police Department defendants admitted that the Cherokee County Sheriff’s Department, which had requested assistance, was not in command, and that instead, Cherokee Indian Police Department's SWAT Commander Scott Buttery led the operation. Section 15-3 of the Cherokee Code additionally states that only the Police Chief can make agreements to assist other organizations, but the Cherokee Indian Police Department defendants admitted that Police Chief Carla Neadeau did not do so with the Cherokee County Sheriff’s Department, rather, her husband, Lieutenant Detective Roger Neadeau Jr., made the agreement (an action that the Cherokee Indian Police Department denied was illegitimate).

In their legal filing, the Cherokee Indian Police Department defendants stated that Cherokee County Sheriff Dustin Smith and Cherokee County Chief Deputy Justin Jacobs were at Kloepfer's property during the shooting, contradicting Smith's public claim, made earlier that year, that he and Jacobs were not there at the time. In contrast, the December 2023 legal filing for the Cherokee County Sheriff’s Department defendants stated that they "lack sufficient knowledge or information to form a belief" on whether Smith or Jacobs were at Kloepfer's property during the shooting, but simultaneously acknowledged that that Jacobs accompanied Kloepfer to the hospital after the shooting.

In December 2023, District Judge Max O. Cogburn Jr. dismissed Kloepfer's lawsuit against attorney Darryl Brown, who had worked for the Cherokee County Sheriff's Office, for failing to prove defamation as Kloepfer did not "sufficiently allege actual malice by Brown". Meanwhile, Cogburn allowed Kloepfer's lawsuit to proceed on some of his claims against the Cherokee County Sheriff's Office and the Cherokee Indian Police Department.

In March 2025, District Attorney Ashley Welch provided an affidavit to the court stating that Cherokee County Sheriff's Office's Lieutenant Milton Teasdale had called her early on December 13, 2022, after the shooting, where Teasdale alleged an "hostage situation" lasting for hours due to Kloepfer, and "that when Jason Kloepfer came to the door of his home, there was a verbal altercation between him and law enforcement and that Kloepfer had come to the door with a gun"; Welch later watched Kloepfer's surveillance video that contradicted Teasdale's allegations. Welch also said that she watched videos provided by Floyd's neighbour, and found "no credible evidence of any criminal activity", and no "evidence of Jason Kloepfer shooting a gun, threatening the neighborhood or threatening law enforcement".

Other March 2025 affidavits alleged that Kloepfer's neighbor had been in romantic relationships with two Cherokee County Sheriff's Office deputies Adam Erickson and Dillion Daniels. The former was the first officer sent to Kloepfer's property that night, while the latter was not present and provided one of the affidavits. The neighbor had told a dispatcher that she sent videos regarding Kloepfer's behavior to Erickson and Daniels. Another woman stated in her affidavit that Erickson told her that the SWAT officers had been "trigger happy", but Erickson declared he would support his "brothers right or wrong".

A trial was scheduled for August 2025. However, the parties settled in advance for $10 million. Cherokee County and the tribe each agreed to pay Kloepfer a sum of $5 million, to be covered by insurance.
