= Scott Voyles =

American conductor (born 1980)

Scott Voyles (born March 3, 1980) is an American conductor.

== Education ==
Born in Kentucky, he was raised on a tobacco farm in rural Breckinridge County. In 1996, he attended the Kentucky Governor's School for the Arts and later the University of Louisville, graduating with a B.M. in Music Performance. He received his M.M. in Orchestral and Opera Conducting at the Indiana University Jacobs School of Music, having studied with Imre Palló, Thomas Baldner, David Effron and John Poole. He later received a master's degree in Contemporary Music Performance from the Hochschule für Musik und Darstellende Kunst (HfMDK) Frankfurt/Main.

In 2006-07, he was Artistic Apprentice of the American Opera Projects in New York City. In 2008-09, he was conductor of the Internationale Ensemble Modern Akademie in Frankfurt, Germany where he worked with conductors Péter Eötvös, Stefan Asbury, Hans Zender, Heinz Holliger, Georges-Elie Octours and Franck Ollu. In 2008/9, he was Music Director of the Ensemble Modern / IEMA production of Kurt Weill's «Die Dreigroschenoper» at the Schauspiel Frankfurt.

== Career ==
Recent debut appearances include the Nadar Ensemble (Belgium), Ensemble Aventure (Freiburg), Ensemble Dal Niente (Chicago), dissonART ensemble (Thessaloniki), and the Ensemble Laboratorium at the Tonhalle Zürich, and appearances at Acht Brücken Köln, 46. Internationale Ferienkurse für Neue Musik Darmstadt, Tage für Neue Musik Zürich, IGNM Basel, IGNM Bern, IMPULS Festival Graz and PACT-Zollverein Essen.

Since 2011, he works regularly with the Ensemble Resonanz in Hamburg. He appeared with Artist-in-Residence Jean-Guihen Queyras, and in April 2012 he conducted the world premiere of «Depuis le jour» for string orchestra and percussion by German composer Isabel Mundry at the Hamburger Ostertöne.

In 2015, he makes his debut with the Göttinger Symphonie Orchester.

== Honors and awards ==
- Lorado Taft Lectureship on Art | University of Illinois at Urbana-Champaign, 2012
- Kulturstiftung des Bundes | German Federal Culture Foundation Grant, 2008/2009
