= Tri-County Community College =

College in Murphy, North Carolina, U.S.

Coordinates: 35.0671°N 83.9661°W

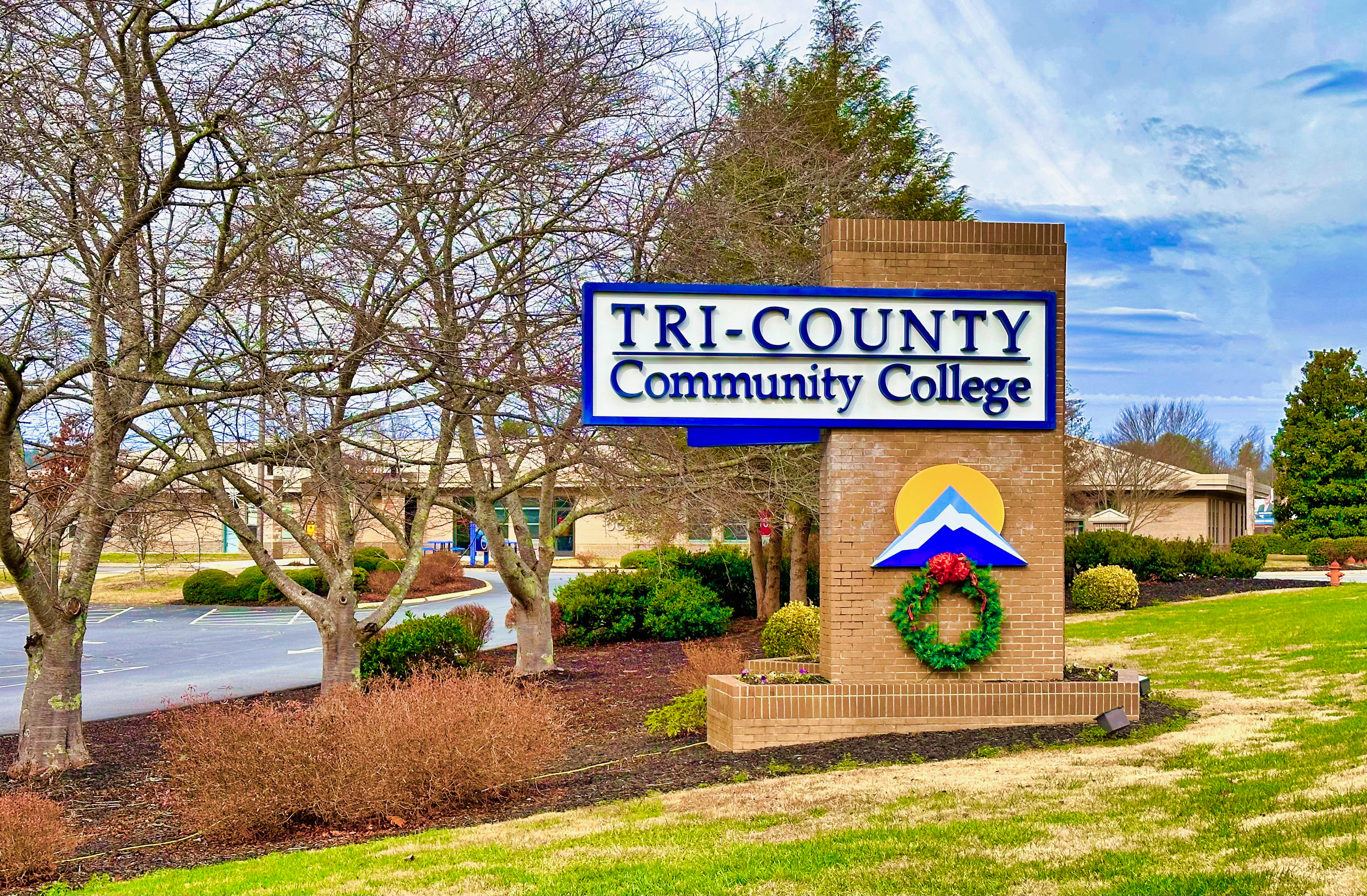
- Type: Public community college
- Active: 1964–Present
- Parent institution: North Carolina Community College System
- President: Donna Tipton-Rogers
- Students: 4715 (2012 academic year)
- Location: Murphy, North Carolina, United States
- Colors: Navy and gold
- Website: www.tricountycc.edu

Tri-County Community College is a public community college in Murphy, North Carolina. It was founded in 1964 to serve Cherokee, Clay, and Graham counties and is part of the North Carolina Community College System.

The college receives $1.2 million in funding from Cherokee County's annual budget as of 2025.

== History ==
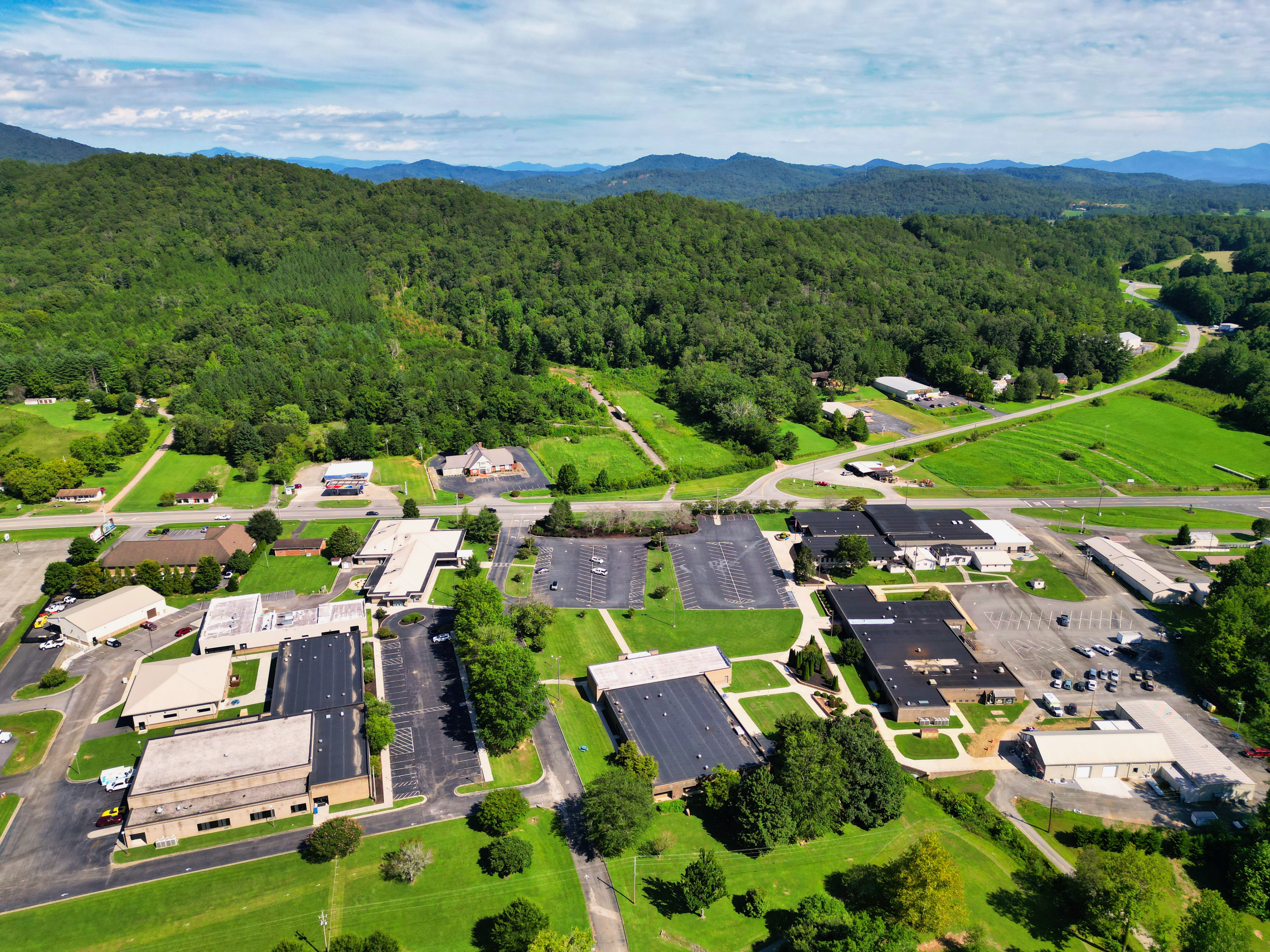
The Tri-County Community College campus

On November 5, 1964, Tri-County Industrial Education Center was approved by the North Carolina Board of Education to serve the region with vocational and trade classes. The following year, the Cherokee County Board of Education negotiated a lease agreement for the college to occupy the abandoned Cherokee County Prison Camp in Peachtree. During the 1970s the McSwain building was renovated. The West building and Crisp building were constructed in 1979. The school became a "technical institute" in 1978 and was accredited as a two-year community college in 1985.

In 1984, the North Carolina Legislature allocated funds for the college to construct a multi-purpose building. The building was completed in 1989 and named for legislator Jeff Enloe, whose support of the college enabled successful appropriation of construction funding.

In 1993 a statewide bond referendum was passed to fund construction of the Graham County Center. Land and buildings were provided in 1995 and the center opened in 1998.

At the Murphy campus, a new building for dual use as a student activities center and an early childhood education center was completed in 1998. Then-president Norman Oglesby named one building for himself. The student activities wing is named for Sarah Easley Harper, originator of the Student Support Center. The early childhood education wing is named the Jarrett/Oglesby Center.

The college opened its four-story Fire and Rescue Training Center in 2003. Tri-County Early College High School opened on the main campus in 2006. TCCC opened its Cherokee County Center of Applied Technology in Marble in 2008 after renovating an existing building there. That same year Donna Tipton-Rogers was appointed as the school's first female president.

Mountain Community Chorus began as a Tri-County class in 1974. The choir now accepts adults from across the region, rehearses at Young Harris College, and performs concerts twice a year. The college launched its culinary arts program in 2016.

In fall 2023, TCCC began offering in-state tuition to Georgia residents for the first time. The offer extends only to residents in Fannin, Rabun, Towns and Union counties. In early 2025, TCCC announced it would buy part of the old National Guard Armory in Murphy for $200,000 as its indoor firing range could be used for the college's Basic Law Enforcement Training program. TCCC said in 2025 that it plans to construct a 33,000-square-foot cultural arts and workforce center behind the Enloe Building on its main campus. Funding has been secured for the project and groundbreaking is expected in 2026. The college wanted to acquire property belonging to the North Carolina Forest Service adjacent to its Peachtree campus for the facility but was unable to.

TCCC had its largest graduating class in history – 321 graduates – in spring 2026.

=== Presidents ===
- Holland McSwain (1964–1972)
- Vincent Crisp (1972–1992)
- Harry Jarrett (1992–1995)
- Norman Oglesby (1996–2006)
- Donna Tipton-Rogers (2007–present)

== Accreditation and approvals ==
The college is accredited by the Southern Association of Colleges and Schools Commission on Colleges to award associate degrees. Relevant programs are also approved by the North Carolina Board of Cosmetic Arts or the North Carolina Board of Nursing.

== Service area ==
Tri-County Community College serves the counties of:

- Cherokee
- Clay
- Graham

=== Local cities ===
- Andrews
- Hayesville
- Murphy
- Robbinsville

== Campus ==
There are three campus locations, the Main Campus in Murphy, and the Graham County Center in Robbinsville, and the Cherokee County Center of Applied Technology in Marble. The main campus has buildings named McSwain, in honor of Holland McSwain, Tri-County Community College's First President; West, for Herman West, a State Legislator and entrepreneur; and Crisp, for Vincent Crisp, Tri-County Community College President from 1972 to 1992.

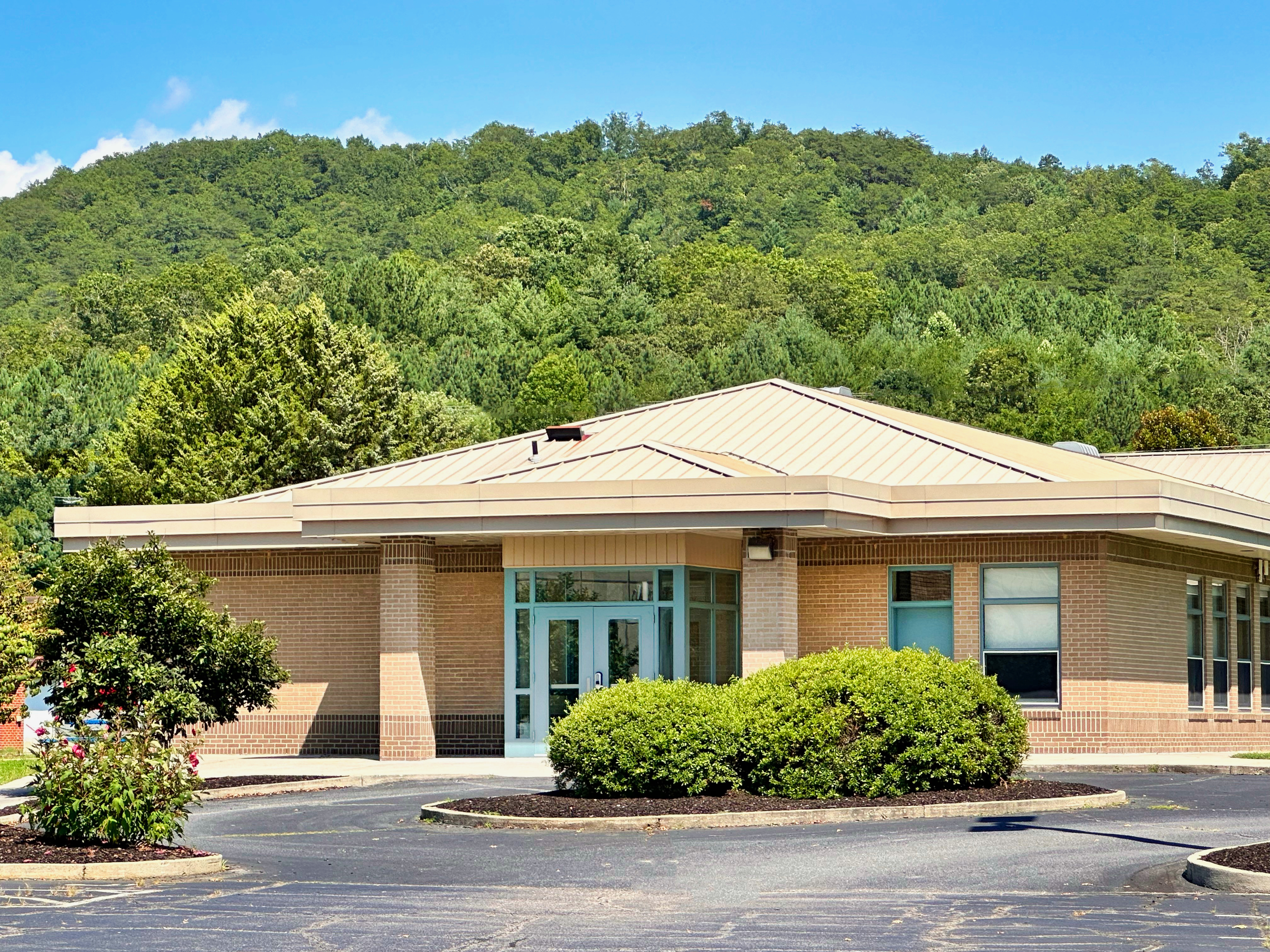
Harper Jarrett Oglesby building (1998)

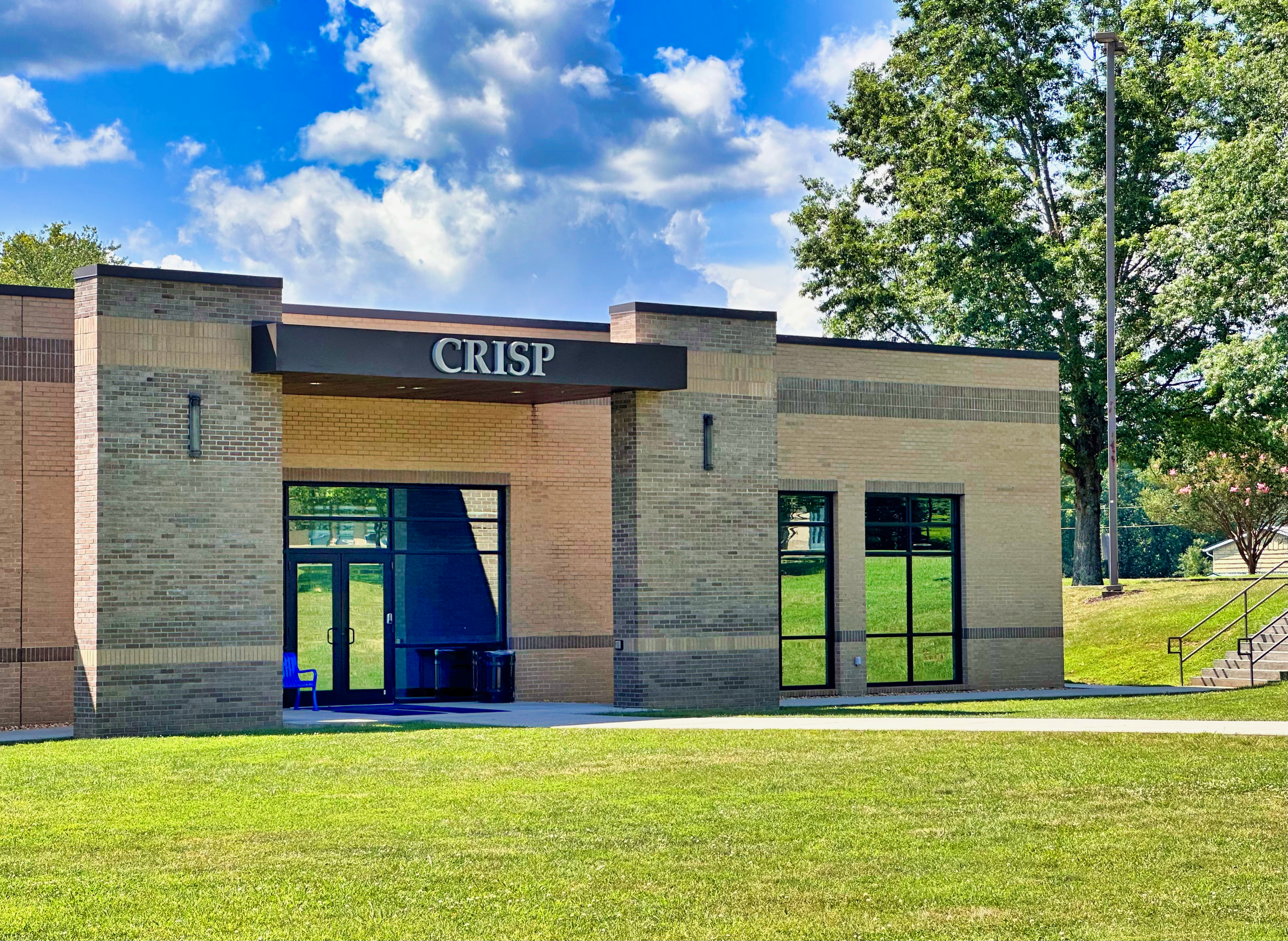
Crisp building (1979)

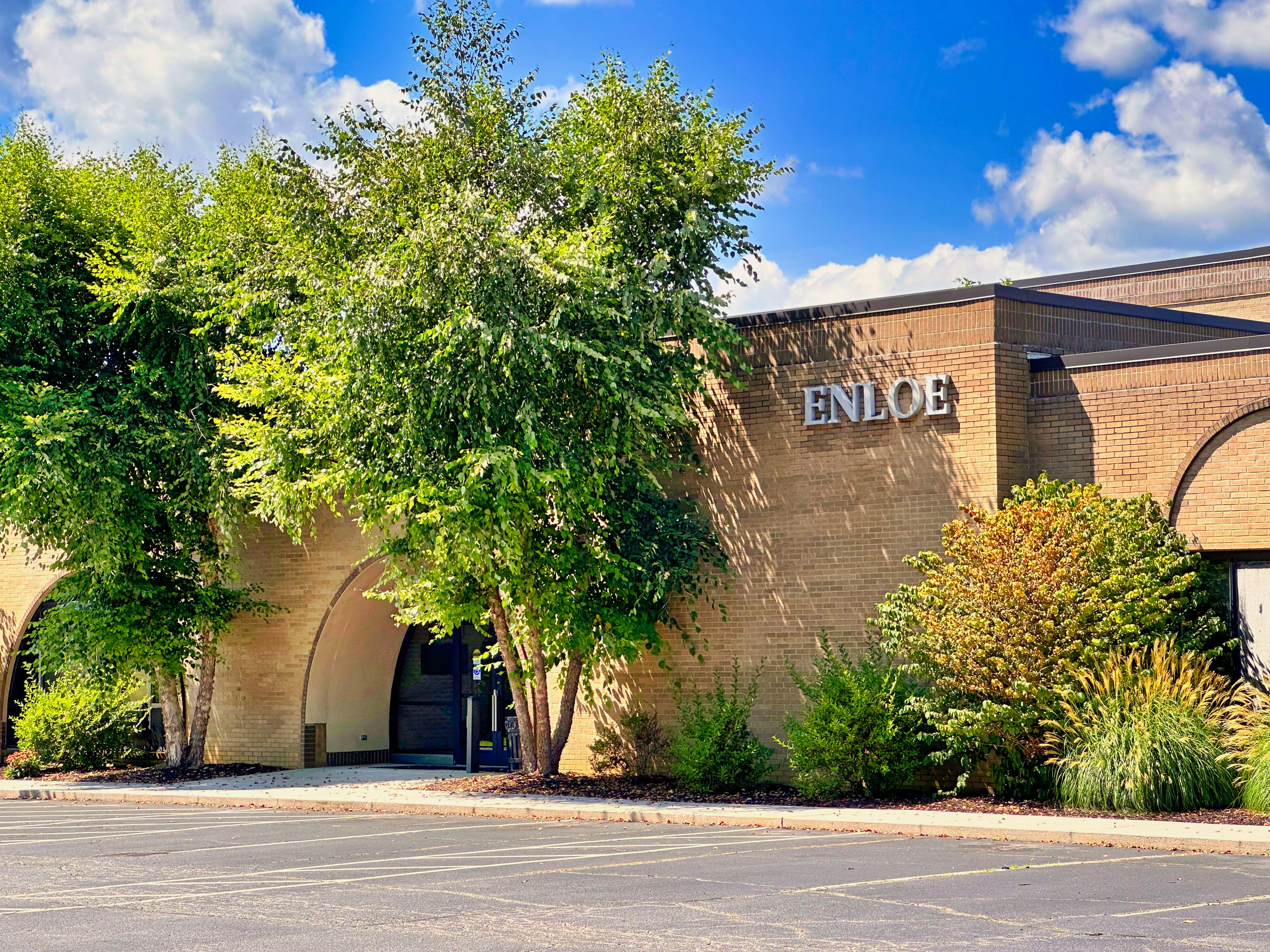
Enloe building (1989)

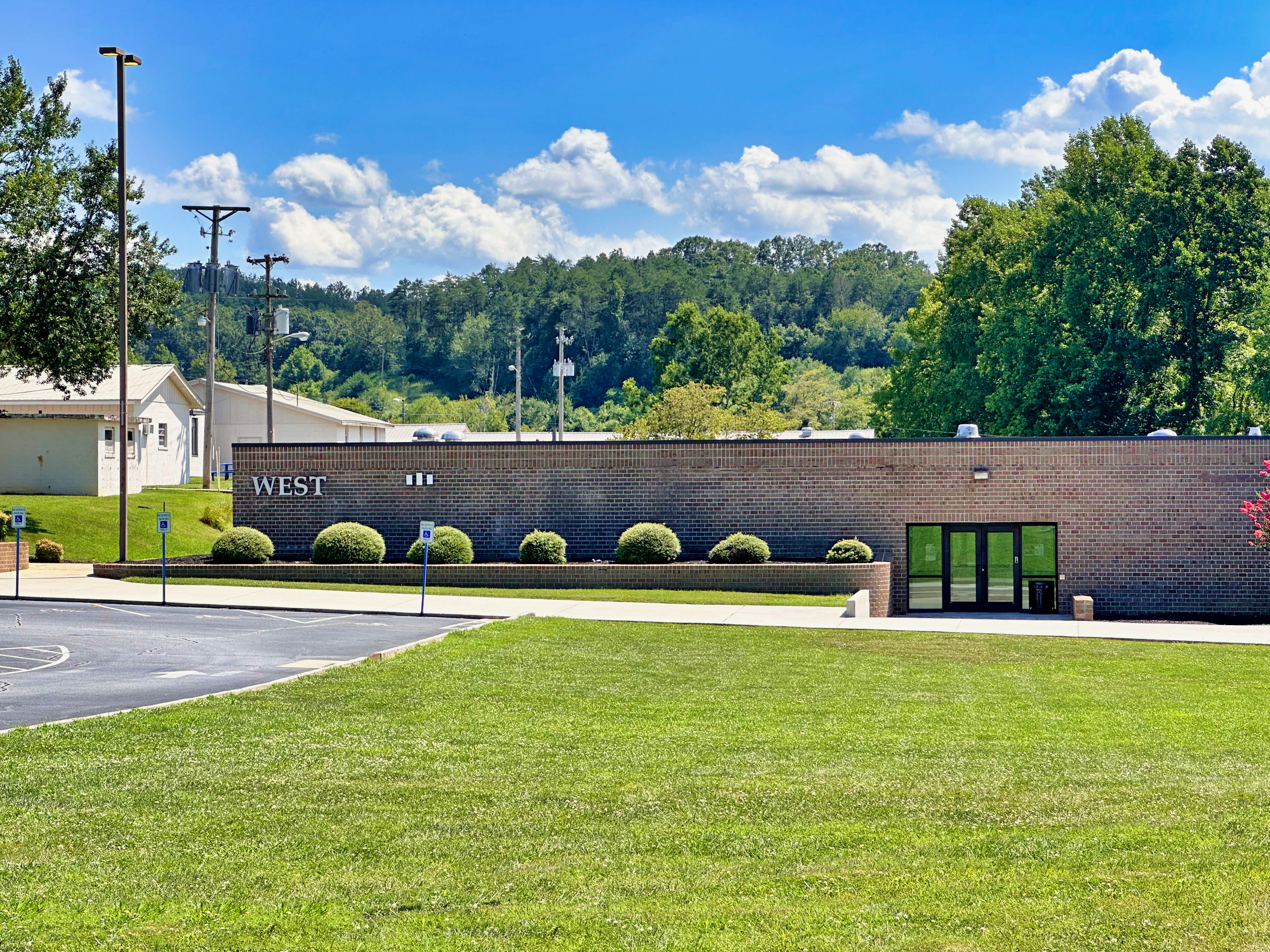
West building (1979)

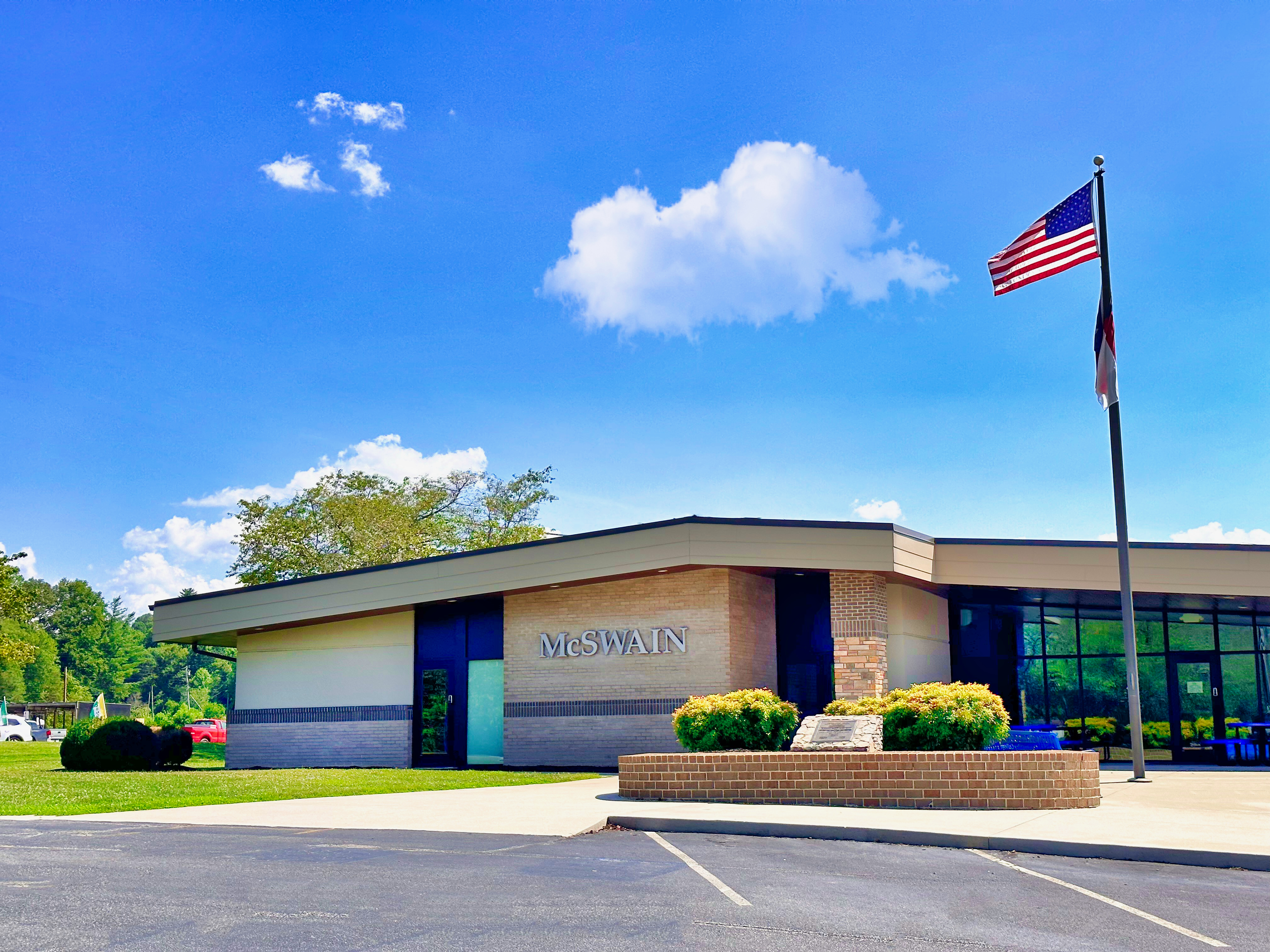
McSwain building (1973)

== College publications ==
The Tri-County Communicator is the student newspaper of TCCC
