= Phil Voyles =

American baseball player (1900–1972)

- Outfielder
- Born: May 12, 1900; Murphy, North Carolina, U.S.
- Died: November 3, 1972 (aged 72); Marlborough, Massachusetts, U.S.
- Batted: Left Threw: Right

MLB debut
- September 4, 1929, for the Boston Braves

Last MLB appearance
- October 6, 1929, for the Boston Braves

MLB statistics
- Batting average: .235
- Home runs: 0
- Runs batted in: 14
- Stats at Baseball Reference

Teams
- Boston Braves (1929)

Philip Vance Voyles (May 12, 1900 – November 3, 1972) was an American outfielder in Major League Baseball. He played for the Boston Braves in 1929.
