= Murphy, North Carolina =

- Town
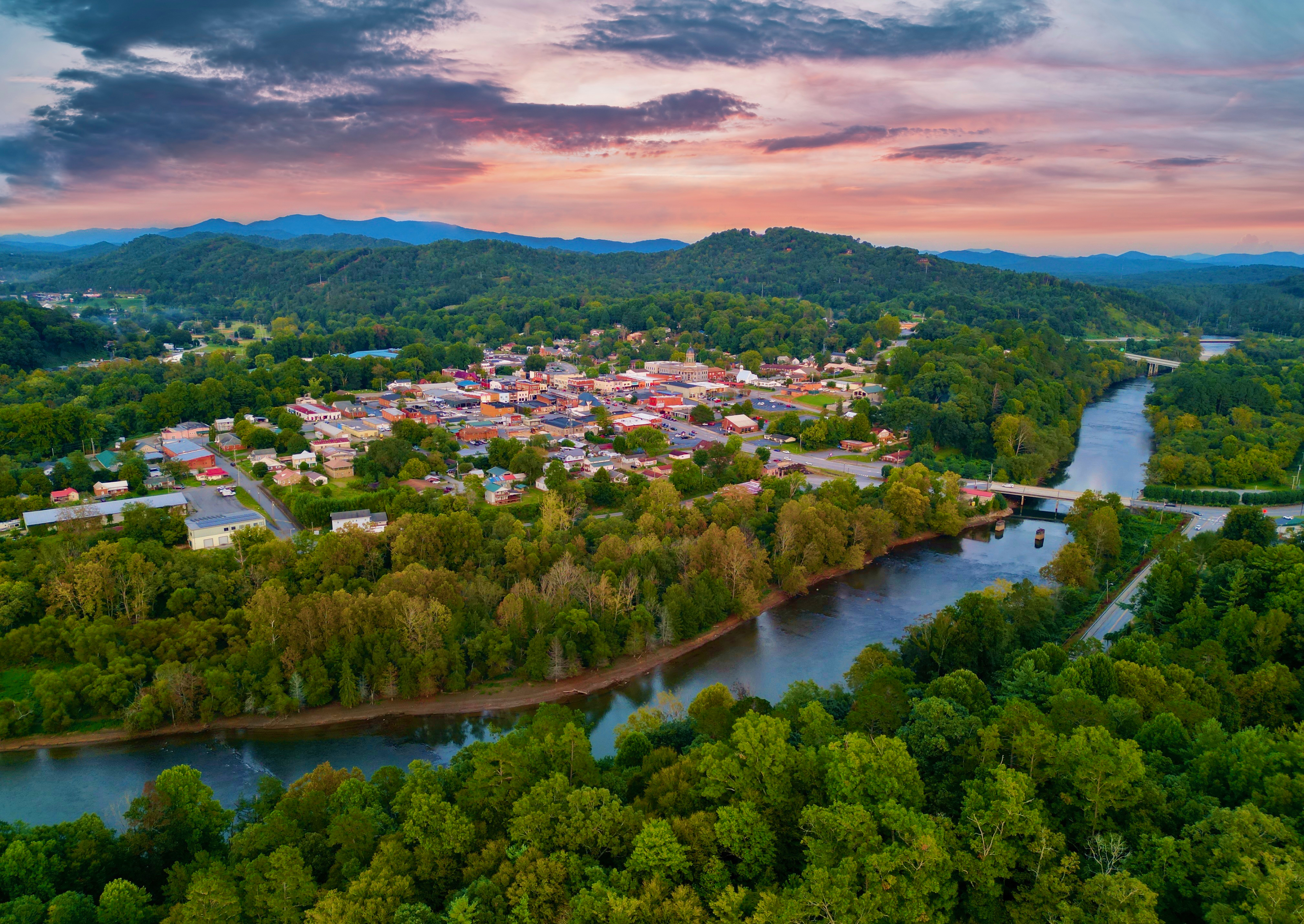
- Murphy next to the Hiwassee River

- Seal
- Nickname: City of Flowers
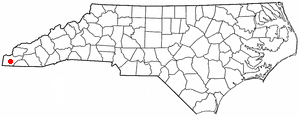
- Location of Murphy, North Carolina
- Coordinates: 35°05′36″N 84°01′41″W
- Country: United States
- State: North Carolina
- County: Cherokee
- Founder: A. R. S. Hunter
- Named for: Archibald Murphey

Government
  - Mayor: Tim Radford

Area
  - Total: 2.64 sq mi (6.85 km^{2})
  - Land: 2.54 sq mi (6.57 km^{2})
  - Water: 0.11 sq mi (0.28 km^{2})
- Elevation: 1,539 ft (469 m)

Population (2020)
  - Total: 1,608
  - Density: 634/sq mi (244.7/km^{2})
- Time zone: UTC−5 (Eastern (EST))
  - Summer (DST): UTC−4 (EDT)
- ZIP code: 28906
- Area code: 828
- FIPS code: 37-45660
- GNIS feature ID: 2406220
- Website: www.townofmurphync.com

Murphy is a town in and the county seat of Cherokee County, North Carolina, United States. It is situated at the confluence of the Hiwassee and Valley rivers. It is the westernmost county seat in the state of North Carolina, approximately 360 miles (580 km) from the state capital in Raleigh. The population of Murphy was 1,608 at the 2020 census.

== Etymology and history ==
This area had long been part of the homelands of the Cherokee people. They knew this site along the Hiwassee River as Tlanusi-yi (the Leech Place). They had a legend about a giant leech named Tlanusi, that lived in the river here. The Trading Path (later called the "Unicoi Turnpike") passed by the future site of Murphy, connecting the Cherokee lands east of the mountains with what were known to European colonists as the "Overhill Towns" of Tennessee.

After European Americans began to settle here, they named the site "Hunnington/ Huntington" after Scottish trader A.R.S. Hunter. Hunter established the first trading post prior to 1828, where he would trade with the Cherokee, early European-American settlers, and U.S. Army soldiers on expeditions, or stationed at nearby Fort Butler. He was also appointed as the settlement's first postmaster, erecting the first Post Office in June 1839.

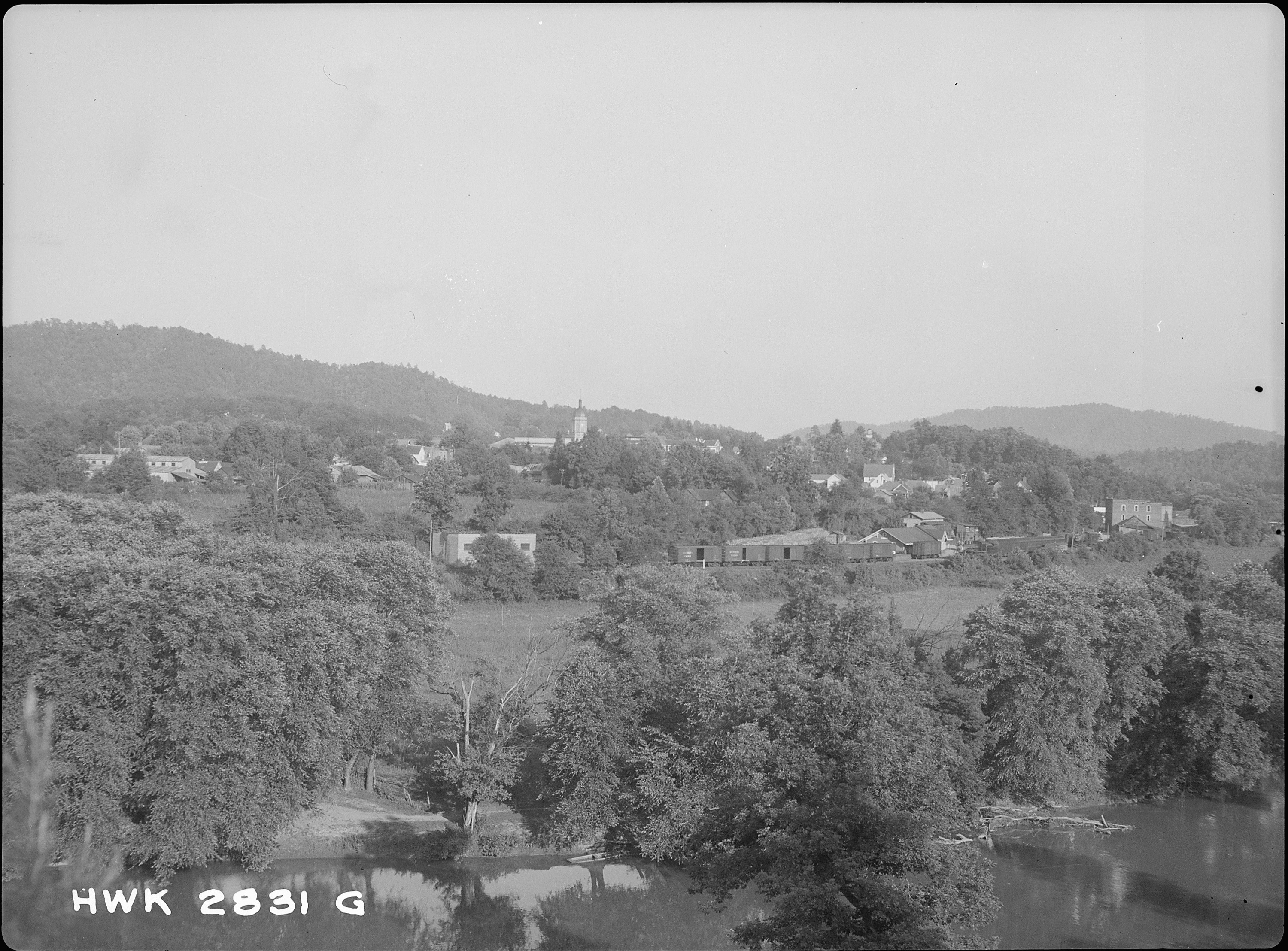
Murphy in 1938

European Americans later renamed the settlement as Murphy for North Carolina politician Archibald Murphey. He was influential in educational advances for the people of North Carolina in the early 19th century. The original spelling of the town was to be "Murphey" but a clerk or stenographer of the North Carolina General Assembly misspelled the name and “Murphy” stuck.

In 1836, during the Cherokee removal known as the Trail of Tears, the United States army built Fort Butler in what is today Murphy. Fort Butler was used as the main collection point by the government for Cherokee east of the mountains. From Fort Butler, the Cherokee were taken over the mountains on the Unicoi Turnpike to the main internment camps at Fort Cass (today Charleston, Tennessee), prior to their forcible removal to territory west of the Mississippi River, in what became known as Indian Territory (today's Oklahoma).

Today, the Unicoi Turnpike is known as the Joe Brown Highway. There are no visible remains of Fort Butler, but the site can be visited and historical markers provide facts and interpretation about its history. In addition, the Cherokee County Historical Museum, located in Murphy, provides information about the Trail of Tears.

A 400-acre tract was surveyed for the town of Murphy in 1837. Cherokee County was formed in 1839 from a portion of Macon County, but Murphy was not incorporated as the county seat until 1851. Harshaw Chapel, the oldest surviving building in Murphy, was constructed in 1869.

In 1888, the railroad reached Murphy, with Georgia and North Carolina Railroad's narrow gauge line built from Marietta, Georgia. In 1891, Southern Railway connected Murphy to Asheville via the Murphy Branch. The L&N line from Georgia was removed in the mid-1980s. The Great Smoky Mountains Railroad ran excursions to Murphy on the Murphy Branch between 1988 and 1995. Today the track and right-of-way are still in place, owned by the North Carolina Department of Transportation, but the line is inoperable. The L&N Depot, built southwest of downtown Murphy in 1901, has been refurbished as a community center.

=== 20th century to present ===
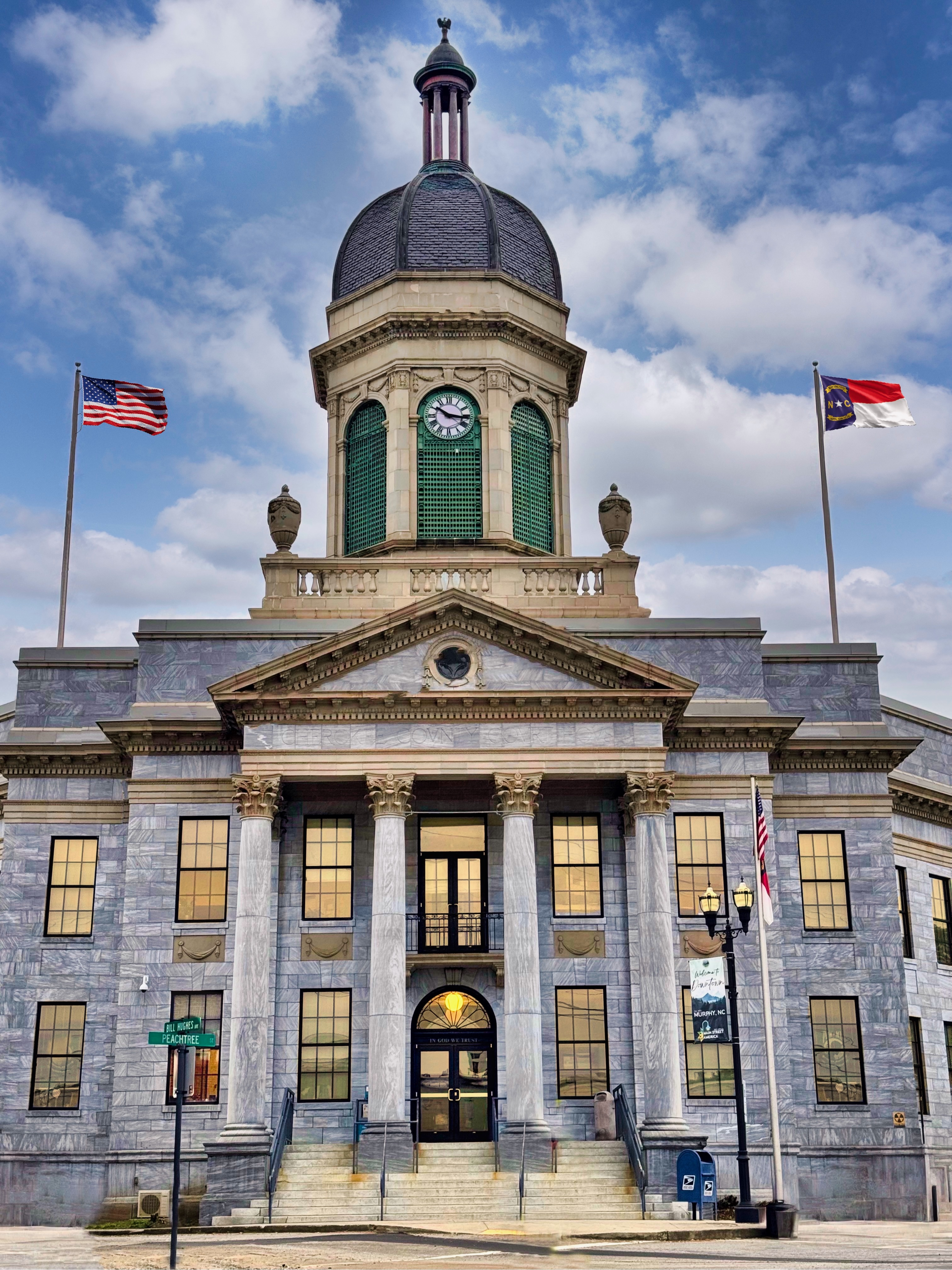
Cherokee County Courthouse

Murphy began getting paved streets in 1917. The first paved road from Murphy to Georgia opened five years later. A highway from Murphy to Asheville opened in 1926.

Architect James Baldwin designed the Cherokee County Courthouse, located in downtown Murphy, in a Beaux-Arts style. Built in 1927, it is faced with locally sourced blue marble. It is listed on the National Register of Historic Places, along with Harshaw Chapel and the Robert Lafayette Cooper House. The county has had multiple prior courthouses; all burned down, or were replaced by improved versions. The first court sessions in the county were held at Fort Butler.

A two-story Carnegie Library was constructed on Peachtree Street downtown in 1919. The building later housed the town police department until 2024 and has been occupied by the Cherokee County Historical Museum since its start in 1977. The Nantahala Regional Library, headquartered in Murphy, is the oldest regional library in the state and one of the first regional libraries formed in the United States. It was organized May 1, 1937, and has locations in Cherokee, Clay, and Graham counties. The current headquarters for the Murphy Public Library and the Nantahala Regional Library opened downtown on May 16, 1976. The building was renovated in 2001.

Murphy was the home of the once well-known crafts manufacturer Margaret Studios. This company operated a nationwide chain of gift stores for its woodcraft products and housewares, such as lazy Susans and gift trays.

Murphy High School was constructed in 1925. A new campus was built to replace the high school in 1957. Murphy gained a public swimming pool in 1931. The pool, which was run by the Lions Club, closed in 1997 and a new pool opened around 2006 as part of the Hiwassee Valley Pool & Wellness Center. The new pool was permanently enclosed in 2022.

Folklorist John Jacob Niles based his well-known Christmas song, "I Wonder as I Wander", on a phrase he heard on July 16, 1933, in a song sung by a daughter of traveling evangelists in downtown Murphy. In 1945, Paul Westmoreland wrote his song “Detour (There's a Muddy Road Ahead)" while traveling to Murphy. He debuted the song in the neighboring town of Hayesville.

Murphy's first medical institution was Petrie Hospital, founded in November 1933 by Dr. R.W. Petrie, an eye, ear, nose, and throat specialist. The hospital was a two-story white brick building atop a hill on Peachtree Street downtown. The Sisters of Providence of Holyoke came to Murphy in 1956 to manage Petrie Hospital and renamed it Providence Hospital. The 22-bed Murphy General Hospital was built by Dr. F. V. Taylor in 1941 and closed in July 1969 due to insufficient staff and property. In January 1974 the Murphy Town Council approved spending $4,000 on a study to see whether constructing a new hospital was feasible. Following this study, Providence Hospital closed in 1978, and Murphy Medical Center was founded in nearby Peachtree in 1979.

The Henn Theater, one of the oldest continually-operating movie theaters in North Carolina, opened in Murphy in 1935. A new Murphy post office was constructed on Hiwassee Street in 1949, replacing the former location on Tennessee Street. In approximately 1961, the two-mile, four lane Dr. William A. Hoover Bridge was built over the Hiwassee River near Murphy to serve US Route 19. Levi Strauss & Co. opened a plant in Murphy in December 1963 to make jeans. The plant hired 380 employees at its peak. It closed in February 1999. Today, the building is occupied by Snap-on Tools. The town's wastewater treatment plant was built in the mid-1960s.

On April 3, 1974, an F4 tornado in Murphy killed four people (including two children) and injured 40. It destroyed 45 houses, 45 mobile homes, and caused major damage to 55 other homes. Local damages totaled $13 million (1974). It was the deadliest of four tornadoes that hit the county during the first four days of April in the 1974 Super Outbreak. An EF2 tornado hit Murphy on March 2, 2012, as part of the Tornado outbreak of March 2–3, 2012. This tornado damaged two schools and affected multiple businesses.

Nearly a year after the March 2012 tornado, debris washed up in the Valley River under the Bulldog Drive bridge and caused the waters to go to the sides, causing strong currents, making a large portion of the bridge collapse. A water system was also damaged and left many businesses east of the bridge without sewer or water. The nearby Murphy High School was without both, with students having to use port-a-potties and carry bagged lunches made at another school.

Bus service to Murphy ended in 1975. A four-lane highway was built between Murphy and the neighboring town of Andrews around 1977. Walmart's first North Carolina store was constructed in Murphy in 1983 and opened on August 16. The store moved to its current location in 1991 and the old building is now a Big Lots, Mexican store, and Mexican restaurant. The 45-acre Konehete Veterans Park was established in the 1990s. In 1999, a 10-mile, 12-inch water line was built to connect Murphy and Andrews' water systems. The interconnect agreement expired in 2022.

Work on Murphy's 4-mile River Walk trail began in 2002. The trail follows the Hiwassee and Valley rivers around downtown, connecting the L&N Depot and Konehete Park. On May 31, 2003 Olympic Park bomber Eric Rudolph was captured behind a Murphy Save-A-Lot by rookie police officer Jeff Postell. In October 2024, one of the oldest remaining buildings in downtown Murphy, the Akin-Axley-Davidson house at 69 Valley River Avenue, was demolished. The home was built during the Civil War. A Triceratops at the N.C. Museum of Natural Sciences was named after the town of Murphy in 2025.

=== Mayoral history ===
1. John H. Hennessee (1887-1893)
2. J.S. Patterson (1893)
3. Drury W. DeWeese (1893-1894)
4. R.L. Cooper (1894-1896)
5. Marshall Williams Bell (1896-1898)
6. Ben Posey (1898-1901)
7. J.V. Brittian (1901-1903)
8. J.R. McLelland (1903-1904)
9. Marshall Williams Bell (1904-1907)
10. A.B. Hill (1907-1909)
11. P.E. Nelson (1909-1913)
12. J.D. Mallonee (1913-1914)
13. P.E. Nelson (1914-1915)
14. S.W. Lovingood (1915-1917)
15. C.B. Hill (1917-1919)
16. T.J. Hill (1919-1921)
17. John H. Dillard (1921-1922)
18. Don Witherspoon (1922-1923)
19. Wm. Mercer Fain (1923-1926)
20. F.N. Hill (1926-1927)
21. A.A. Fain (1927-1928)
22. Harry P. Cooper (1928-1930)
23. W. McMillan (1930-1931)
24. S.W. Lovingood (1931–1932)
25. V.J. Britt (1932-1933)
26. E.B. Norvell (1933-1934)
27. J.B. Gray (1934-1941)
28. C.D. Mayfield (1941-1942)
29. E.L. "Leondas" Shields (1942-1943)
30. J.W. Franklin (1943-1944)
31. Wm. Mercer Fain (1944-1946)
32. Oliver Neil Sneed (1946-1950)
33. Buel Adams (1950-1952)
34. L.L. Mason Jr. (1952-1966)
35. Cloe Moore (1966-1997)
36. William Hughes (1997–2017)
37. Rick Ramsey (2017–2021)
38. Tim Radford (2021–present)

== Demographics ==
Historical population
| Census | Pop. | Note | %± |
|---|---|---|---|
| 1870 | 175 | | — |
| 1880 | 170 | | −2.9% |
| 1890 | 803 | | 372.4% |
| 1900 | 604 | | −24.8% |
| 1910 | 977 | | 61.8% |
| 1920 | 1,314 | | 34.5% |
| 1930 | 1,612 | | 22.7% |
| 1940 | 1,873 | | 16.2% |
| 1950 | 2,433 | | 29.9% |
| 1960 | 2,235 | | −8.1% |
| 1970 | 2,082 | | −6.8% |
| 1980 | 2,070 | | −0.6% |
| 1990 | 1,575 | | −23.9% |
| 2000 | 1,568 | | −0.4% |
| 2010 | 1,627 | | 3.8% |
| 2020 | 1,608 | | −1.2% |
U.S. Decennial Census

Murphy's homeless population was 46 as of 2025.

=== Racial and ethnic composition ===
Murphy town, North Carolina – Racial and ethnic composition Note: the US Census treats Hispanic/Latino as an ethnic category. This table excludes Latinos from the racial categories and assigns them to a separate category. Hispanics/Latinos may be of any race.
| Race / Ethnicity (NH = Non-Hispanic) | Pop 2000 | Pop 2010 | Pop 2020 | % 2000 | % 2010 | % 2020 |
|---|---|---|---|---|---|---|
| White alone (NH) | 1,385 | 1,383 | 1,291 | 88.33% | 85.00% | 80.29% |
| Black or African American alone (NH) | 86 | 66 | 66 | 5.48% | 4.06% | 4.10% |
| Native American or Alaska Native alone (NH) | 18 | 39 | 26 | 1.15% | 2.40% | 1.62% |
| Asian alone (NH) | 21 | 34 | 37 | 1.34% | 2.09% | 2.30% |
| Native Hawaiian or Pacific Islander alone (NH) | 0 | 0 | 0 | 0.00% | 0.00% | 0.00% |
| Other race alone (NH) | 0 | 3 | 4 | 0.00% | 0.18% | 0.25% |
| Mixed race or Multiracial (NH) | 13 | 34 | 141 | 0.83% | 2.09% | 8.77% |
| Hispanic or Latino (any race) | 45 | 68 | 43 | 2.87% | 4.18% | 2.67% |
| Total | 1,568 | 1,627 | 1,608 | 100.00% | 100.00% | 100.00% |

=== 2020 census ===
As of the 2020 United States census, there were 1,608 people, 774 households, and 394 families residing in the town.

=== 2010 census ===
As of the 2010 census, the total population was 1,621 people.

=== 2000 census ===
As of the census of 2000, there were 1,568 people, 725 households, and 440 families residing in the town. The population density was 687.7 inhabitants per square mile (265.5/km^{2}). There were 819 housing units at an average density of 359.2 per square mile (138.7/km^{2}). The racial makeup of the town was 89.60% White, 5.48% African American, 1.28% Native American, 1.34% Asian, 1.15% from other races, and 1.15% from two or more races. Hispanic or Latino of any race were 2.87% of the population.

There were 725 households, out of which 22.2% had children under the age of 18 living with them, 41.5% were married couples living together, 15.6% had a female householder with no husband present, and 39.3% were non-families. 36.4% of all households were made up of individuals, and 21.2% had someone living alone who was 65 years of age or older. The average household size was 2.13 and the average family size was 2.71.

In the town, the population was spread out, with 20.3% under the age of 18, 8.9% from 18 to 24, 23.2% from 25 to 44, 23.4% from 45 to 64, and 24.2% who were 65 years of age or older. The median age was 43 years. For every 100 females, there were 87.1 males. For every 100 females age 18 and over, there were 80.6 males.

The median income for a household in the town was $24,952, and the median income for a family was $35,234. Males had a median income of $30,395 versus $16,908 for females. The per capita income for the town was $16,926. About 16.7% of families and 22.9% of the population were below the poverty line, including 36.2% of those under age 18 and 21.4% of those age 65 or over.

== Economy ==
Occupations of Murphy, North Carolina
1. Management & Professional (25.0%)
2. Service (15.3%)
3. Sales & Office (21.1%)
4. Farm, Fishing & Forestry (1.90%)
5. Construction, Extraction & Maintenance (17.4%)
6. Production/Transportation (19.3%)

The economy of Murphy is fairly spread out, with a quarter of the population employed in the management and professional sector; about one fifth of the population are employed in either sales/office or construction, maintenance and extraction sectors. The smallest percentage, at only 1.9% are employed in the farm fishing or forestry sector. Murphy also has a relatively low median income per household, at $24,952.

The median income for a household in the town was $24,952, and the median income for a family was $35,234. Males had a median income of $30,395 versus $16,908 for females. The per capita income for the town was $16,926. About 16.7% of families and 22.9% of the population were below the poverty line, including 36.2% of those under age 18 and 21.4% of those age 65 or over.

As of 2025, downtown Murphy is visited nearly 2 million times a year. The downtown consists of 91 first-floor storefronts (which have a five percent vacancy rate), more than 20 eateries, and three arts organizations.

There are several employers for advanced skilled professions, including Moog Components Group, Aegis Power Systems, Murphy Medical Group, Sioux Tools, and Tri-County Community College. Harrah's Cherokee Valley River, a tribal casino that opened in Murphy in 2015, is also a major job supplier.

Additionally, there are two Bitcoin mining operations in Murphy – one by Core Scientific and the other by Atlas Technology Group. The area's low power rates and sprawling landscape are attractive to these operations.

== Education ==
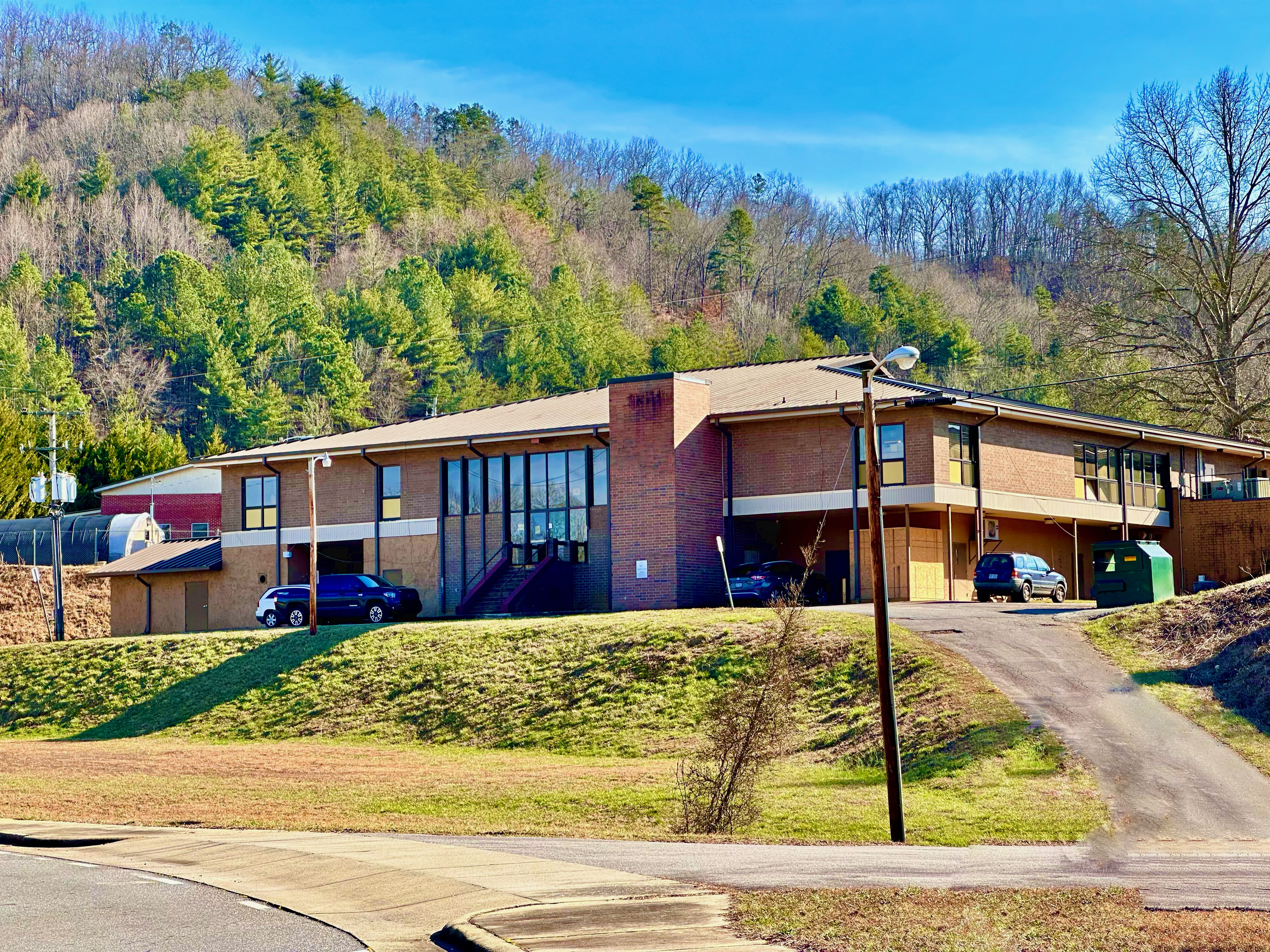
Murphy High School Vocational Building

The local public school system is run by Cherokee County Schools, which operates a total of 13 schools across the county:

- Murphy Elementary
- Peachtree Elementary
- Marble Elementary
- Martins Creek Elementary
- Ranger Elementary
- Murphy Middle
- Andrews Middle
- Hiwassee Dam Middle
- The Oaks Academy
- Andrews High
- Hiwassee Dam High
- Murphy High
- Tri-County Early College

One alternative education option is Murphy Adventist Christian School (K-8). There is also a thriving homeschool community.

Higher education is offered at Tri-County Community College, or several nearby colleges and universities including North Georgia Technical College, Young Harris College, Western Carolina University, Southwestern Community College, and University of North Georgia. As of 2023, approximately 25 percent of Murphy residents have a bachelor's degree or higher, compared to 37 percent of residents statewide.

The John C. Campbell Folk School, the oldest and largest folk school in the United States, is located in Brasstown, an unincorporated village near Murphy. It exists partly in Cherokee County and partly in Clay County. This education center focuses on creative folk arts for all ages. The folk school also offers musical concerts and community dance entertainment.

== Transportation ==
Murphy sits just northwest of 19/74/64/129 which runs from just southwest of Murphy to Topton, just before US 129 breaks off. It is easily accessed by motor vehicle.

In-town and in-county transportation is available, for a small fee, via Cherokee County Transit. There are also private taxis for hire.

Western Carolina Regional Airport (ICAO: KRHP, FAA LID: RHP), known locally as the Murphy Airport, Andrews Airport, or Andrews-Murphy Airport, is located between the cities of Andrews and Murphy.

The closest commercial passenger airports are the Chattanooga Metropolitan Airport (IATA: CHA) 83 miles and the Hartsfield–Jackson Atlanta International Airport (IATA: ATL) 126 miles.

== Infrastructure ==
=== Utilities ===
Electricity for Western North Carolina is provided by Duke Energy, sometimes referred to as Duke Power. It has a total service territory covering 47,000 square miles (120,000 km^{2}) Half of its power generation for the Carolinas comes from its nuclear power plants. Some of the power is supplied via solar panel farms located in the Murphy area. There are at least four solar farms, each with more than 4,000 panels. One of the farms, called Martins Creek Solar Project, alone provides "enough electricity to power more than 150 average-sized homes and enough revenue for the district to staff approximately two full-time teachers."

The town of Murphy's power is provided by Murphy Electric Power Board.

Natural gas is supplied by Piedmont Gas, which services North Carolina, South Carolina, and Tennessee.

=== Media ===
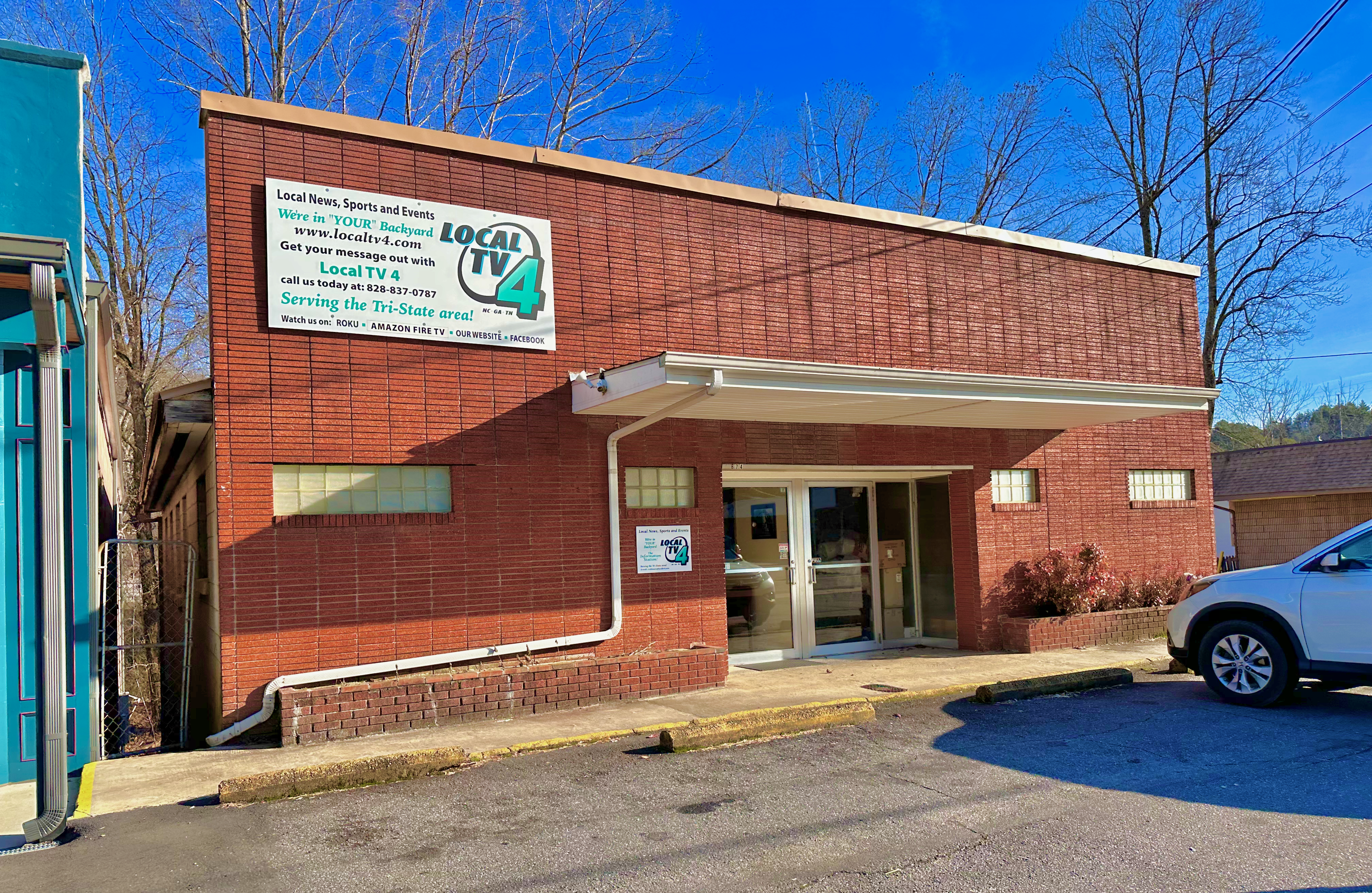
Local TV 4 is a television news station based in Murphy

The weekly Cherokee Scout based in Murphy is Cherokee County's only newspaper. It was founded in 1889.

WKRK 1320 AM, WCVP 600 AM, and WCNG 102.7 FM are three radio stations currently broadcast from Murphy.

Local TV 4 is a Murphy-based television news station.

=== Roads and bridges ===
There are 14.8 miles of roads maintained by the Town of Murphy, while other surroundings roads are maintained by the NC Department of Transportation. The Town receives about $56,000 per year in support of street maintenance. Of notable interest is a historic tee beam bridge located in downtown Murphy, NC, showcasing an early use of haunched, continuous cantilever bridge design.

=== Healthcare ===
Murphy and all of Cherokee County are served by Erlanger Western Carolina Hospital, certified by the United States Department of Health and Human Services. It is licensed for 191 beds, of which 120 are nursing home beds, 57 are general-use beds, and the remaining 14 are dedicated to Alzheimer's patients.

As of 2023, approximately 21 percent of Murphy residents have disabilities, compared to 14 percent of residents statewide. About 20 percent of Murphy residents do not have health insurance, which is more than double the statewide rate.

=== Law enforcement ===
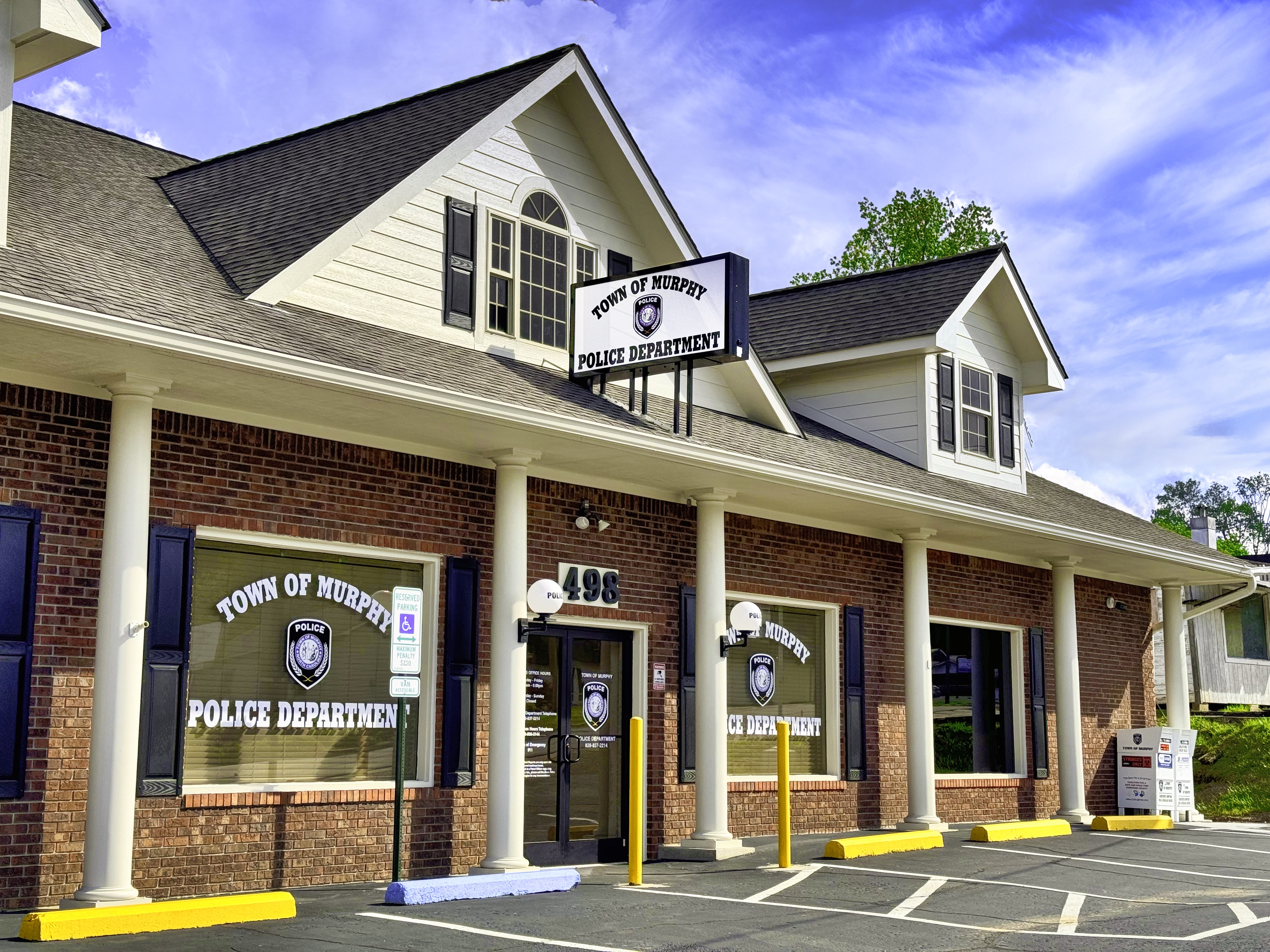
The Murphy Police Department at 498 Hill St.

Murphy and the surrounding unincorporated communities are protected by the Murphy Police Department. In February 2024, the department moved to a new headquarters at 498 Hill St. outside downtown. The new location cost $565,100, plus $70,000 in renovations. The new station, which was built as a bank in 1988, is three times larger than the former headquarters. The department had for decades been located in the basement of the old Carnegie Library at 93 Peachtree Street next to the courthouse. The current chief of police is Tim Lominac.

Cherokee County as a whole is served by the Cherokee County Sheriff's Office. Chris Wood is the current Sheriff, he has served in that capacity since 2026. The current Cherokee County Jail was built in 2008 and can house around 150 inmates. It replaced the older 1922 jail that has since been demolished.

==== Crime rate ====
According to the county government, crimes in the area consist primarily of domestic abuse (accounting for greater than 60% of incidents). Violent crimes decreased year-over-year in 2018 by 15.3%, compared to an overall reduction of 7.3% for the entire state.

==== Fire safety ====
As of 2026, the Murphy Fire District is under a Class 2 protection rating and the Murphy Rural Fire District has a Class 3 rating. Murphy is the only fire department in North Carolina west of Buncombe County to have a Class 2 rating, making it one of the highest-performing fire agencies in the state.

== Geography ==
Murphy is located east of the center of Cherokee County at the confluence of the Hiwassee River and Valley River. In 2026, Tennessee Valley Authority released a map showing that approximately 59 structures around Murphy would be flooded in the event that Chatuge Dam failed.

According to the United States Census Bureau, the town has a total area of 2.6 square miles (6.8 km^{2}), of which 2.4 square miles (6.2 km^{2}) is land and 0.23 square miles (0.6 km^{2}), or 9.13%, is water.

=== Topography ===
Murphy is located in southwestern North Carolina, approximately halfway between Atlanta, Georgia and Knoxville, Tennessee. The topography consists of gentle rolling hills and mountains with tall peaks, including ranges from 1800 ft to more than 5000 ft elevation. The location in the Blue Ridge Mountains has helped the community retain a fairly rural character, surrounded by wildlife such as bear, deer, fox and recently reintroduced elk.

=== Climate ===
Murphy has a humid subtropical climate, (Cfa) according to the Köppen classification, with hot, humid summers and cool to mild winters, with low temperatures significantly cooler than other parts of the Southeast, due in part to the elevation. Like the rest of the southeastern U.S., Murphy receives abundant rainfall, greatest in winter and enhanced by the elevation. Receiving as much as 100 inches per year in some parts, areas of Cherokee County are considered part of the Appalachian temperate rainforest. Blizzards are rare but possible; the 1993 Storm of the Century dropped 15 inches (38 cm) in 24 hours with more snowfall continuing up to 38" in some areas, causing widespread power outages and natural disasters.

The monthly 24-hour average temperature ranges from 37.5 °F (3.1 °C) in January to 74.9 °F (23.8 °C) in July; there are 20 days of 90 °F (32 °C)+ highs, 106 days of freezing lows, and 4 days where the high stays at or below freezing annually. Extreme temperatures range from −16 °F (−27 °C) on January 21 and 22, 1985 up to 100 °F (38 °C) on July 1 and 2, 2012.

Climate data for Murphy 4ESE, North Carolina (1991–2020 normals, extremes 1873–present)
| Month | Jan | Feb | Mar | Apr | May | Jun | Jul | Aug | Sep | Oct | Nov | Dec | Year |
|---|---|---|---|---|---|---|---|---|---|---|---|---|---|
| Record high °F (°C) | 76 (24) | 81 (27) | 88 (31) | 92 (33) | 91 (33) | 98 (37) | 100 (38) | 99 (37) | 96 (36) | 93 (34) | 84 (29) | 77 (25) | 100 (38) |
| Mean maximum °F (°C) | 67.1 (19.5) | 71.3 (21.8) | 77.9 (25.5) | 84.7 (29.3) | 87.0 (30.6) | 90.7 (32.6) | 92.5 (33.6) | 92.1 (33.4) | 89.5 (31.9) | 83.0 (28.3) | 76.5 (24.7) | 68.0 (20.0) | 93.8 (34.3) |
| Mean daily maximum °F (°C) | 49.8 (9.9) | 53.5 (11.9) | 61.6 (16.4) | 70.8 (21.6) | 77.5 (25.3) | 83.5 (28.6) | 86.6 (30.3) | 86.0 (30.0) | 81.3 (27.4) | 71.8 (22.1) | 61.4 (16.3) | 52.7 (11.5) | 69.7 (20.9) |
| Daily mean °F (°C) | 37.5 (3.1) | 40.8 (4.9) | 47.7 (8.7) | 56.0 (13.3) | 64.1 (17.8) | 71.3 (21.8) | 74.9 (23.8) | 74.2 (23.4) | 68.6 (20.3) | 57.5 (14.2) | 47.1 (8.4) | 40.5 (4.7) | 56.7 (13.7) |
| Mean daily minimum °F (°C) | 25.3 (−3.7) | 28.0 (−2.2) | 33.8 (1.0) | 41.2 (5.1) | 50.7 (10.4) | 59.2 (15.1) | 63.2 (17.3) | 62.3 (16.8) | 55.8 (13.2) | 43.3 (6.3) | 32.8 (0.4) | 28.4 (−2.0) | 43.7 (6.5) |
| Mean minimum °F (°C) | 8.4 (−13.1) | 13.4 (−10.3) | 18.9 (−7.3) | 27.2 (−2.7) | 36.2 (2.3) | 48.8 (9.3) | 56.2 (13.4) | 54.9 (12.7) | 43.3 (6.3) | 29.1 (−1.6) | 19.8 (−6.8) | 14.7 (−9.6) | 5.7 (−14.6) |
| Record low °F (°C) | −16 (−27) | −4 (−20) | −3 (−19) | 18 (−8) | 25 (−4) | 35 (2) | 46 (8) | 46 (8) | 28 (−2) | 21 (−6) | 6 (−14) | −4 (−20) | −16 (−27) |
| Average precipitation inches (mm) | 5.10 (130) | 5.26 (134) | 5.29 (134) | 5.20 (132) | 4.75 (121) | 5.41 (137) | 5.25 (133) | 4.70 (119) | 4.28 (109) | 3.45 (88) | 4.60 (117) | 5.99 (152) | 59.28 (1,506) |
| Average snowfall inches (cm) | 0.8 (2.0) | 1.5 (3.8) | 0.1 (0.25) | 0.0 (0.0) | 0.0 (0.0) | 0.0 (0.0) | 0.0 (0.0) | 0.0 (0.0) | 0.0 (0.0) | 0.0 (0.0) | 0.1 (0.25) | 1.9 (4.8) | 4.4 (11) |
| Average precipitation days (≥ 0.01 in) | 11.5 | 11.3 | 11.9 | 10.9 | 11.4 | 12.6 | 12.2 | 11.3 | 9.2 | 8.2 | 9.3 | 11.9 | 131.7 |
| Average snowy days (≥ 0.1 in) | 0.9 | 0.9 | 0.2 | 0.0 | 0.0 | 0.0 | 0.0 | 0.0 | 0.0 | 0.0 | 0.1 | 0.8 | 2.9 |
Source: NOAA

=== Nearby communities ===
Cities and populated areas within an approximate 15-mile (24 km) radius of Murphy:

== Notable people ==
- Harry Atwood – engineer and inventor who landed a plane on the White House lawn
- Jan Davidson – folklorist who was the longest serving director of the John C. Campbell Folk School
- Abraham Enloe (1762–1841) – remains interred at Harshaw Chapel in downtown Murphy, NC. Alleged to be the biological father of US President Abraham Lincoln
- Preston Henn – founder of the Fort Lauderdale Swap Shop and race car driver
- Junaluska – 19th-century Cherokee hero famous for actions at Battle of Horseshoe Bend, born in what is now Murphy
- Jason Harley Kloepfer – unarmed man shot by Eastern Band of Cherokee Indian Police SWAT Team
- Michael Mauldin, music executive
- Ella Henrietta Davidson Morrison – North Carolina State Regent of the Daughters of the American Revolution
- Carl Pickens – 1992 NFL Offensive Rookie of the Year. Two-time Pro Bowl selection with the Cincinnati Bengals and former All-American wide receiver for the Tennessee Volunteers.
- Eric Rudolph – Best known as the 1996 Centennial Olympic Park bomber, caught and arrested in Murphy in 2003 by rookie police officer Jeffrey Scott Postell; now serving multiple life sentences in ADX Florence. Originally from Florida.
- Braden Rumfelt – singer, American Idol season 24 finalist
- John J. Snow Jr. – member of the North Carolina Senate
- Phil Voyles – former MLB player for the Boston Braves
- Hedy West – noted 1960s-era folksinger and songwriter, Murphy High School graduate

== See also ==
- List of municipalities in North Carolina

== Sources ==
- Duncan, Barbara R. and Riggs, Brett H. Cherokee Heritage Trails Guidebook. University of North Carolina Press: Chapel Hill (2003). ISBN 0-8078-5457-3
- Carl Pickens football career data at databaseFootball.com
