= WCVP (AM) =

- Murphy, North Carolina; United States
- Frequency: 600 kHz
- Branding: The Big 6

Programming
- Format: Oldies
- Affiliations: AP Radio; Motor Racing Network; Performance Racing Network

Ownership
- Owner: Cherokee Broadcasting Company

History
- First air date: October 12, 1958

Technical information
- Licensing authority: FCC
- Facility ID: 10695
- Class: D
- Power: 1,000 watts day 20 watts night
- Transmitter coordinates: 35°4′0.00″N 83°59′58.00″W

Links
- Public license information: Public file; LMS

WCVP (600 AM) is a radio station broadcasting an oldies format. Licensed to Murphy, North Carolina, United States, the station is currently owned by Cherokee Broadcasting Company and features programming from AP Radio and Jones Radio Network.

The station is an affiliate of the Atlanta Braves radio network, the largest radio affiliate network in Major League Baseball. WCVP is also an affiliate of the Motor Racing Network and the Performance Racing Network, airing NASCAR racing.

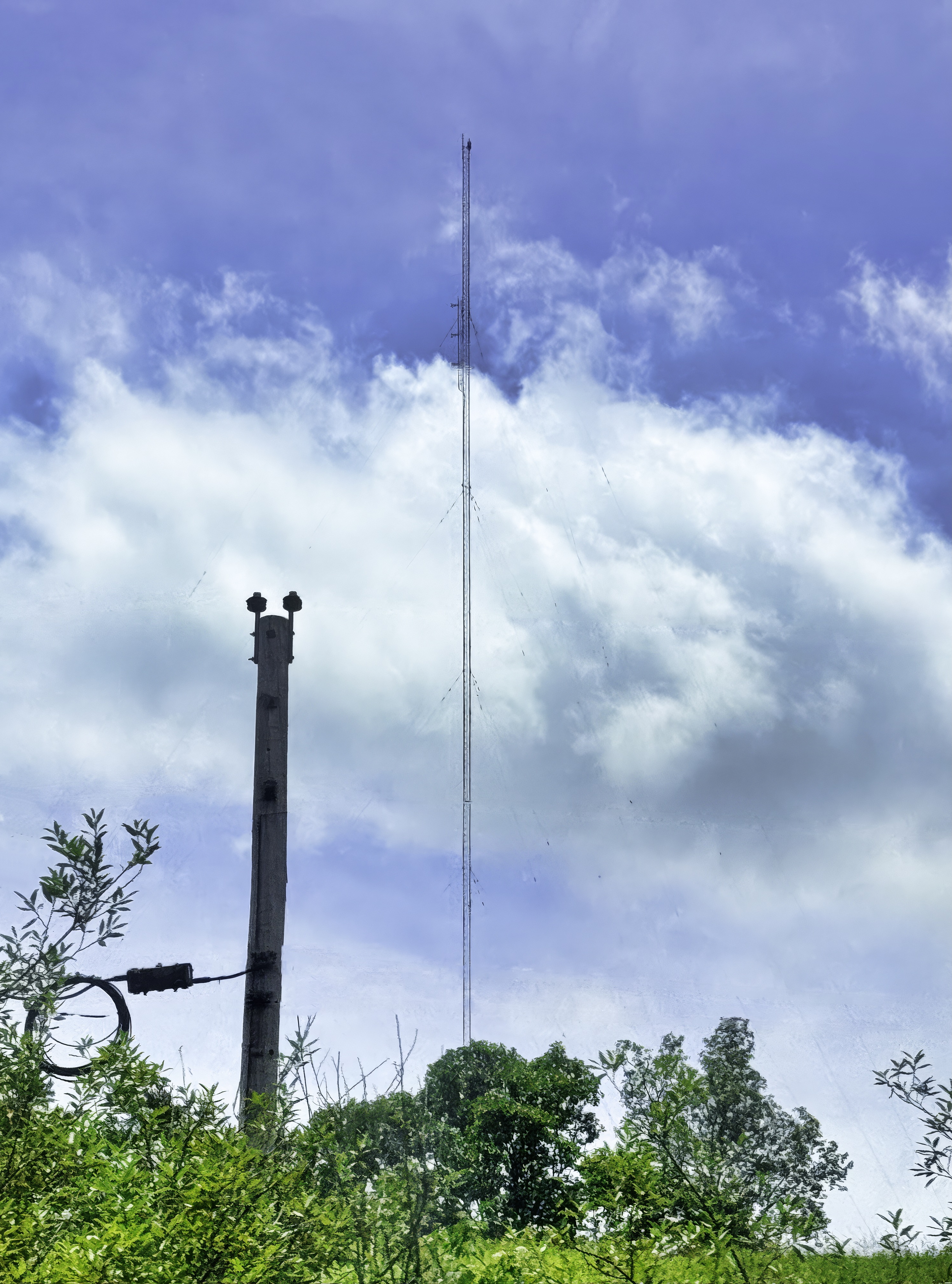
The WCVP radio tower

== History ==
WCVP first aired on October 12, 1958. A fire in February 1968 at the Townson Building in downtown Murphy destroyed WCVP's studios and other businesses. Neighboring WKRK radio helped WCVP return to air quickly afterward. In February 1974, a 29-year-old man died when he fell more than 100 feet off of the 450-foot WCVP radio tower in Murphy. The radio tower was knocked down and broken during the tornado outbreak of April 1–2, 1974. The tower was replaced with one 20 feet taller in June 1974.
