= WKRK (AM) =

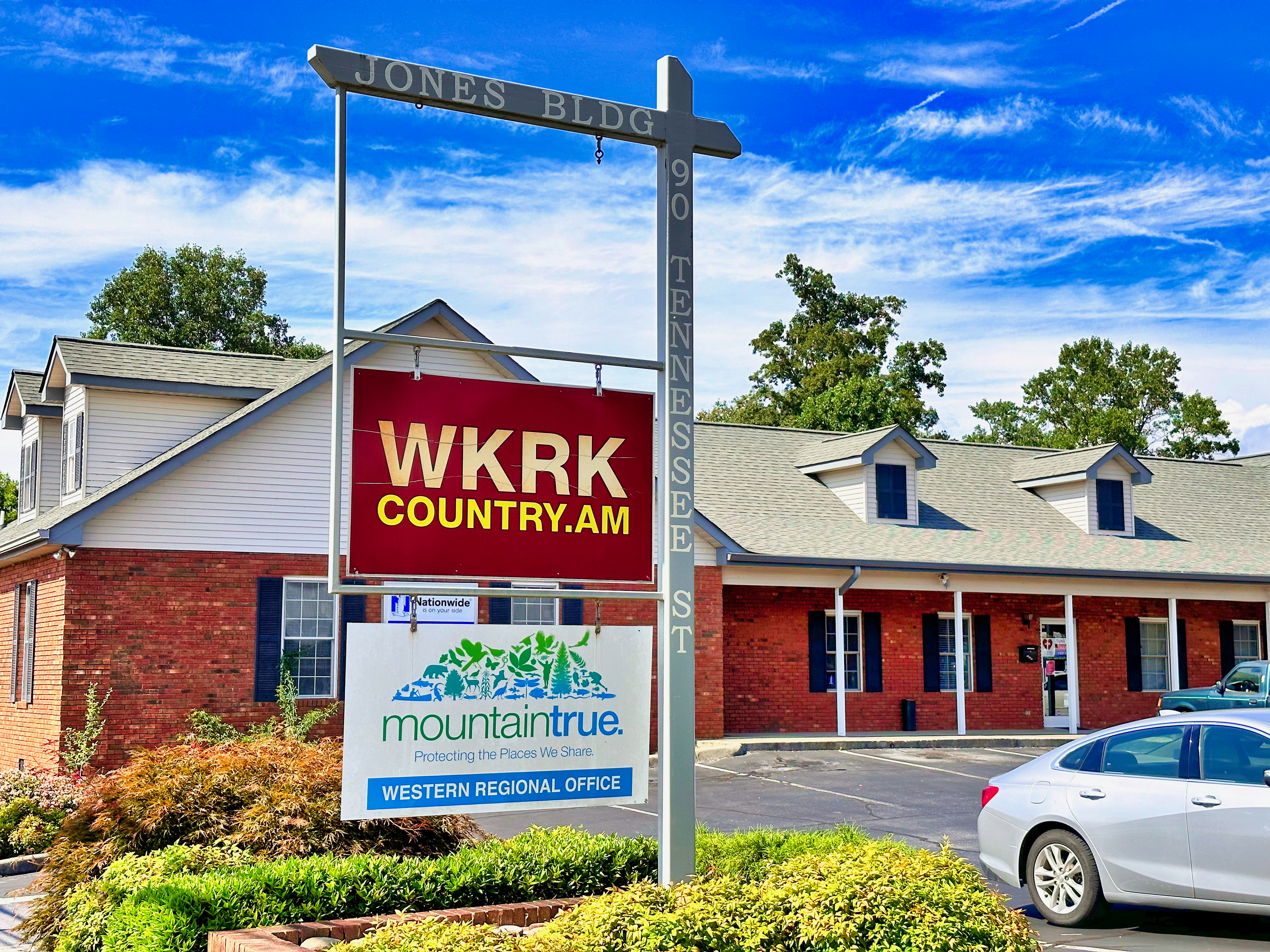
- Murphy, North Carolina; United States
- Frequency: 1320 kHz

Programming
- Format: Southern gospel
- Affiliations: ABC News Radio, Singing News Radio

Ownership
- Owner: Radford Communications, Inc.

History
- First air date: August 8, 1958
- Call sign meaning: Kim, Ronnie and Kathy, children of former owner Jim Childress

Technical information
- Facility ID: 10829
- Class: D
- Power: 5,000 watts day 62 watts night
- Transmitter coordinates: 35°6′42.00″N 84°0′31.00″W
- Translator: 105.5 W288DI (Murphy)

Links
- Website: http://www.1320am.com/

WKRK (1320 AM) is a radio station broadcasting a southern gospel format and is affiliated with Singing News Radio. Licensed to Murphy, North Carolina; it has been owned by the Radford family since July 20, 1995, and features a popular tradio show called PartyLine as well as hourly ABC News Radio.

WKRK's daytime signal reaches Western North Carolina, North Georgia, and East Tennessee. WKRK is found at 1320 AM and as of Easter weekend 2016, WKRK began broadcasting at 105.5 FM. The station is simulcast on Channel 25 through The Cable Company serving Cherokee County, North Carolina. WKRK was voted as the best radio station in Cherokee County in the Cherokee Scout newspaper's 2026 Readers' Choice awards.

== History ==
WKRK first went on the air on August 8, 1958. Paul Ridenhour was the station's original owner. Current owner Tim Radford started as an announcer at the station when he was 16 years old and purchased the business in 1995 when he was 22. Radford became mayor of Murphy in 2021 and continues to serve in that position as of 2026.
