= WCVP-FM =

- Robbinsville, North Carolina; United States
- Frequency: 95.9 MHz

Programming
- Format: Country
- Affiliations: AP Radio, Jones Radio Network

Ownership
- Owner: Cherokee Broadcasting Company, Inc.

History
- First air date: 1987

Technical information
- Licensing authority: FCC
- Facility ID: 10700
- Class: A
- ERP: 120 watts
- HAAT: 612 meters
- Transmitter coordinates: 35°15′28.00″N 83°47′44.00″W

Links
- Public license information: Public file; LMS

WCVP-FM (95.9 FM) is a radio station broadcasting a country music format. Licensed to Robbinsville, North Carolina, United States, the station is currently owned by Cherokee Broadcasting Company, Inc. and features programming from AP Radio and Jones Radio Network.

The station is an affiliate of the Atlanta Braves radio network, the largest radio affiliate network in Major League Baseball.
