= Peachtree, North Carolina =

Community located in Cherokee County, North Carolina

Coordinates: 35°05′38″N 83°56′34″W

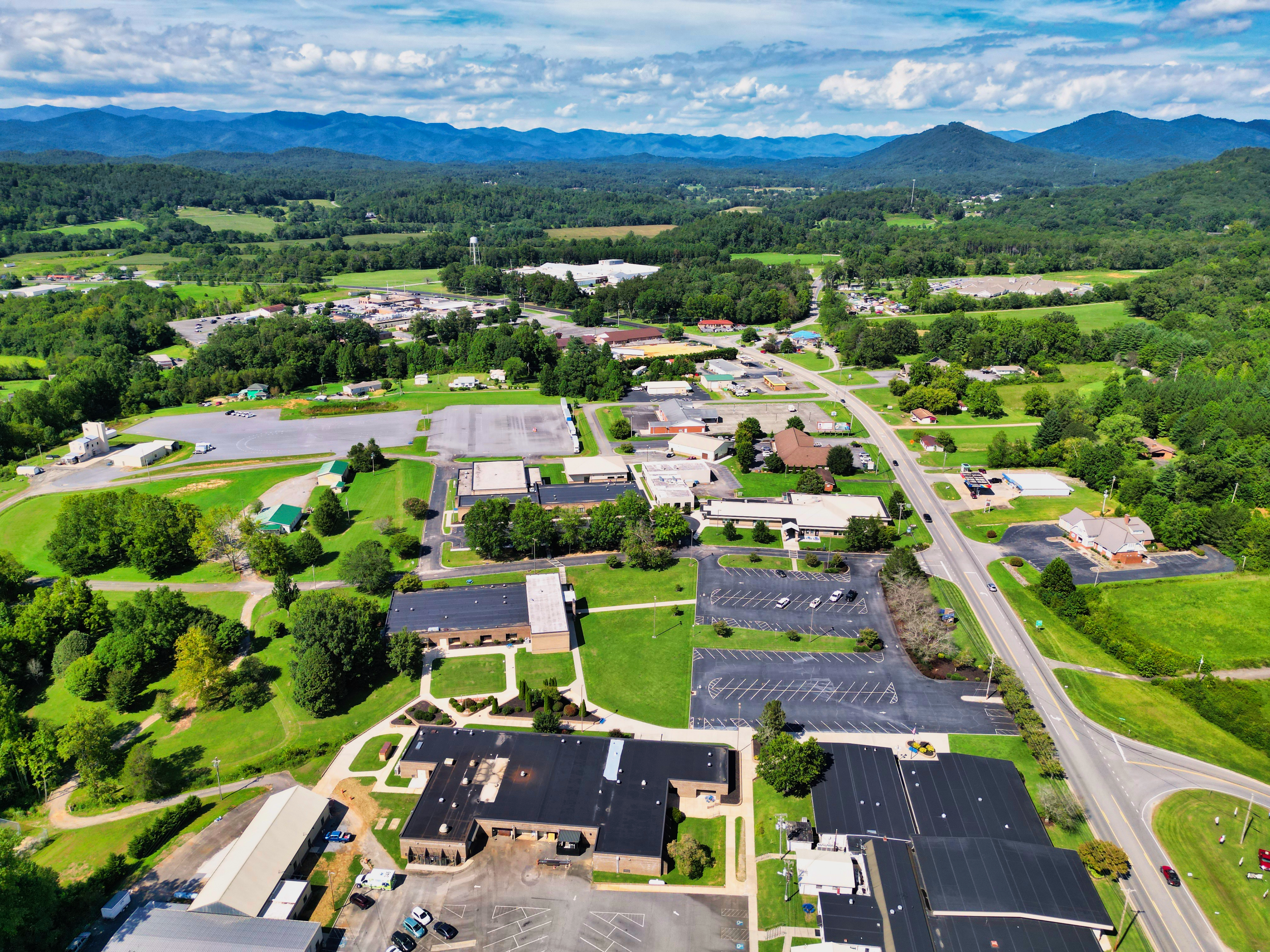
Peachtree business district in 2023

Peachtree is a community located in Cherokee County, North Carolina. It is named after the numerous peach trees found in the area.

Due to its central location near the border of Cherokee and Clay counties, Peachtree has also been home to major institutions serving the area. The Cherokee County Prison Camp opened in 1939 but was abandoned after 25 years following multiple escapes. Its property became the main campus of Tri-County Community College, which opened in 1964 and serves Cherokee, Clay, and Graham counties. Erlanger Western Carolina Hospital, the only hospital in North Carolina west of Franklin and Bryson City, was founded in Peachtree in 1979.

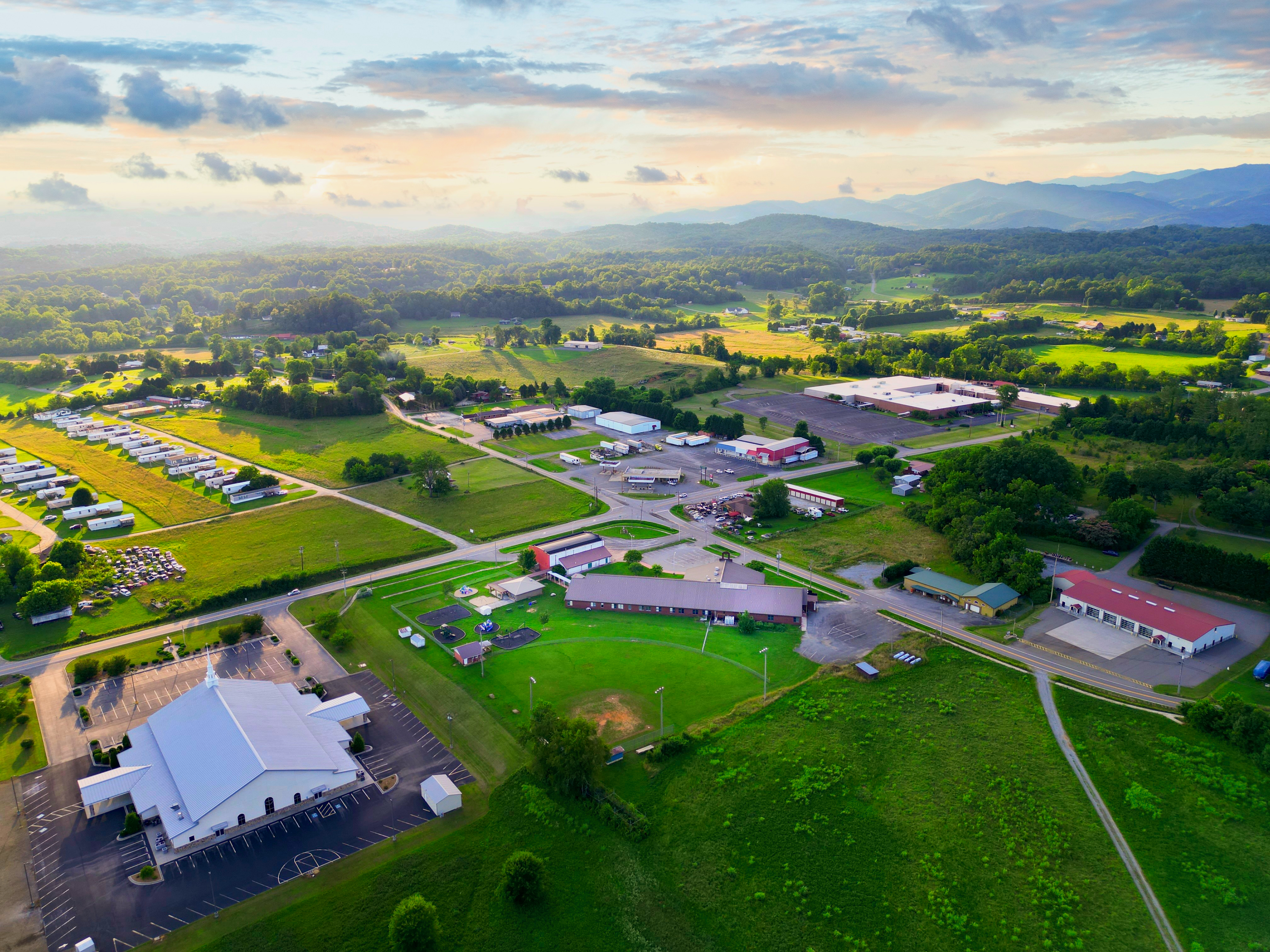
Peachtree residential district in 2026

In 2003, Moog Inc. established a manufacturing facility in Peachtree employing more than 400 people to build motors and blowers for the aerospace industry. Peachtree is home to a 134-bed nursing home which was built in 2020 and the Cherokee County headquarters for the North Carolina Forest Service. Also, the $20 million, 66,000-square-foot Cherokee County School of Innovation & Technology campus opened in 2023.

== History ==
Cherokee Native Americans had a courthouse building named the Hiwassee Townhouse located in Peachtree. Around 1755, after being scattered by war, the Natchez Native Americans also established a town near Peachtree. In 1820, a Baptist Mission School at the Natchez town was founded by Rev. Evan Jones. The Native Americans were forcibly removed from the area during the summer of 1838 via the Trail of Tears. From 1933-1934, the Smithsonian Institution excavated a Native American burial mound in Peachtree as anthropologist John R. Swanton suspected the mound might be the location of Guasili, which was visited by Hernando de Soto in 1540.

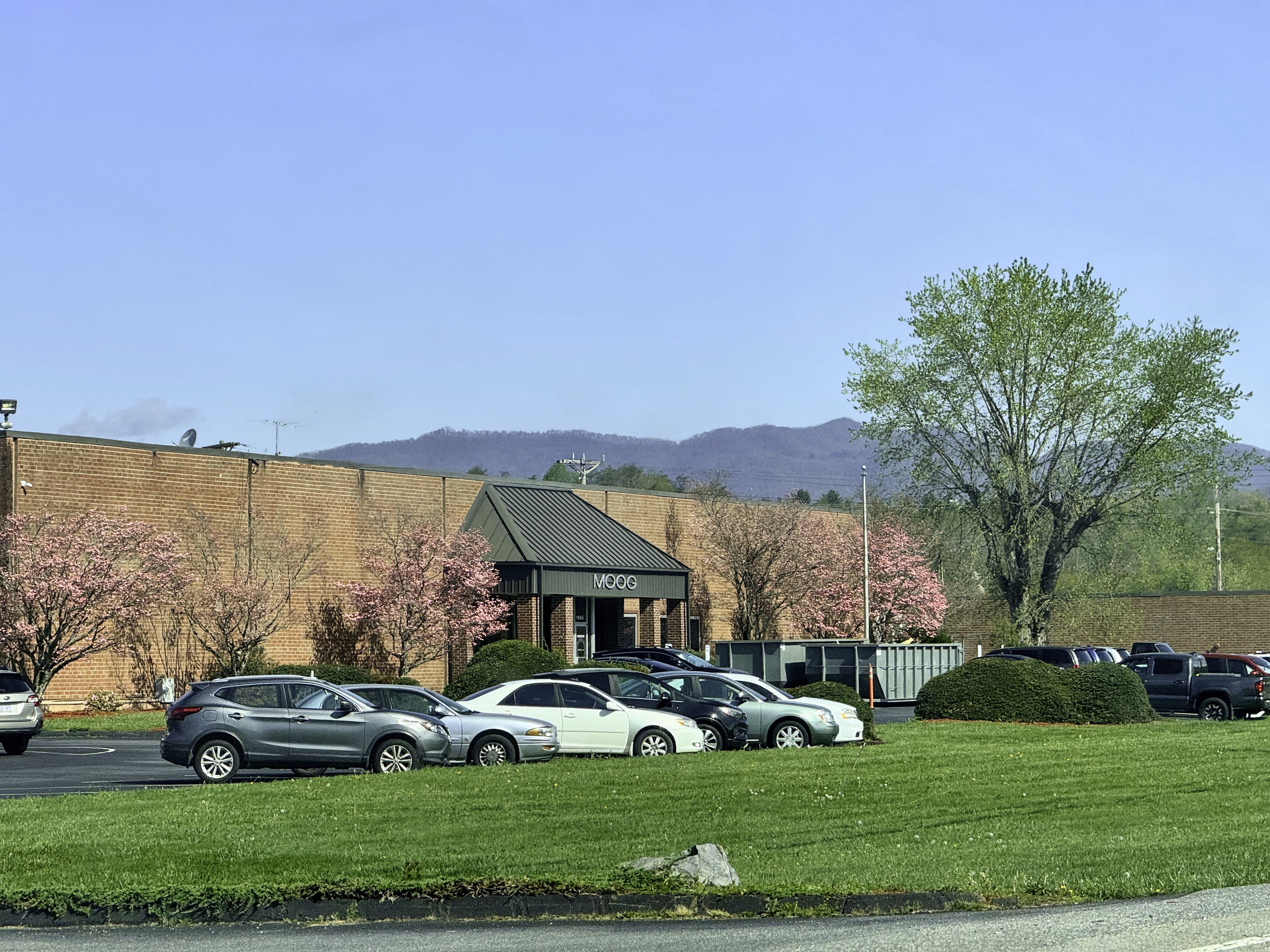
Moog Inc.'s manufacturing plant in Peachtree

In 1837, settlers established a Baptist church in Peachtree. Peachtree had its own post office from 1839 to 1866 and again between 1878 and 1907. Five one-room school houses operated in different parts of Peachtree from 1901 to 1910. In 1910, a wooden junior high school was constructed and served the community for 19 years. A new brick school and auditorium were erected in 1928. When the state began providing bus transport, the junior high school closed and high school students attended Murphy High School. A fire destroyed the Peachtree school in 1945 and a new $100,000, eight-classroom Peachtree Elementary School was constructed in 1947. By 1957, the school enrolled 250 students. After a fire in 1986, the classroom building was rebuilt in 1989.

The community was considered as a site for the Western Carolina Regional Airport, which was later constructed 8 miles (13 km) northeast in Marble. The community was formerly the site of the "Murphy Drive-In" movie theater. The theater's screen was flattened by high winds in 1974. The Peachtree Volunteer Fire Department was founded in 1974. Its current facility was built in 2009. The Peachtree Community Center was built in 1976 and serves as the local polling place. The center was renovated in 2024. The 332-employee Peachtree Products plant closed in January 1975. Aegis Power Systems founded its Peachtree plant in 1995.

In the early 2020s Peachtree was the planned site of a single consolidated high school for Cherokee County, combining Andrews, Hiwassee Dam, and Murphy high schools. In 2023, however, new members of the Cherokee County Board of Education voted against the plan.

On the night of May 8, 2024, an EF-1 tornado hit Peachtree, as part of the Tornado outbreak of May 6–9, 2024. One home was destroyed and seven suffered major damage. This is the most recent confirmed tornado in Cherokee County, the previous being around 2018. A tornado was said to have also hit Peachtree on March 3, 2023.

== Education ==
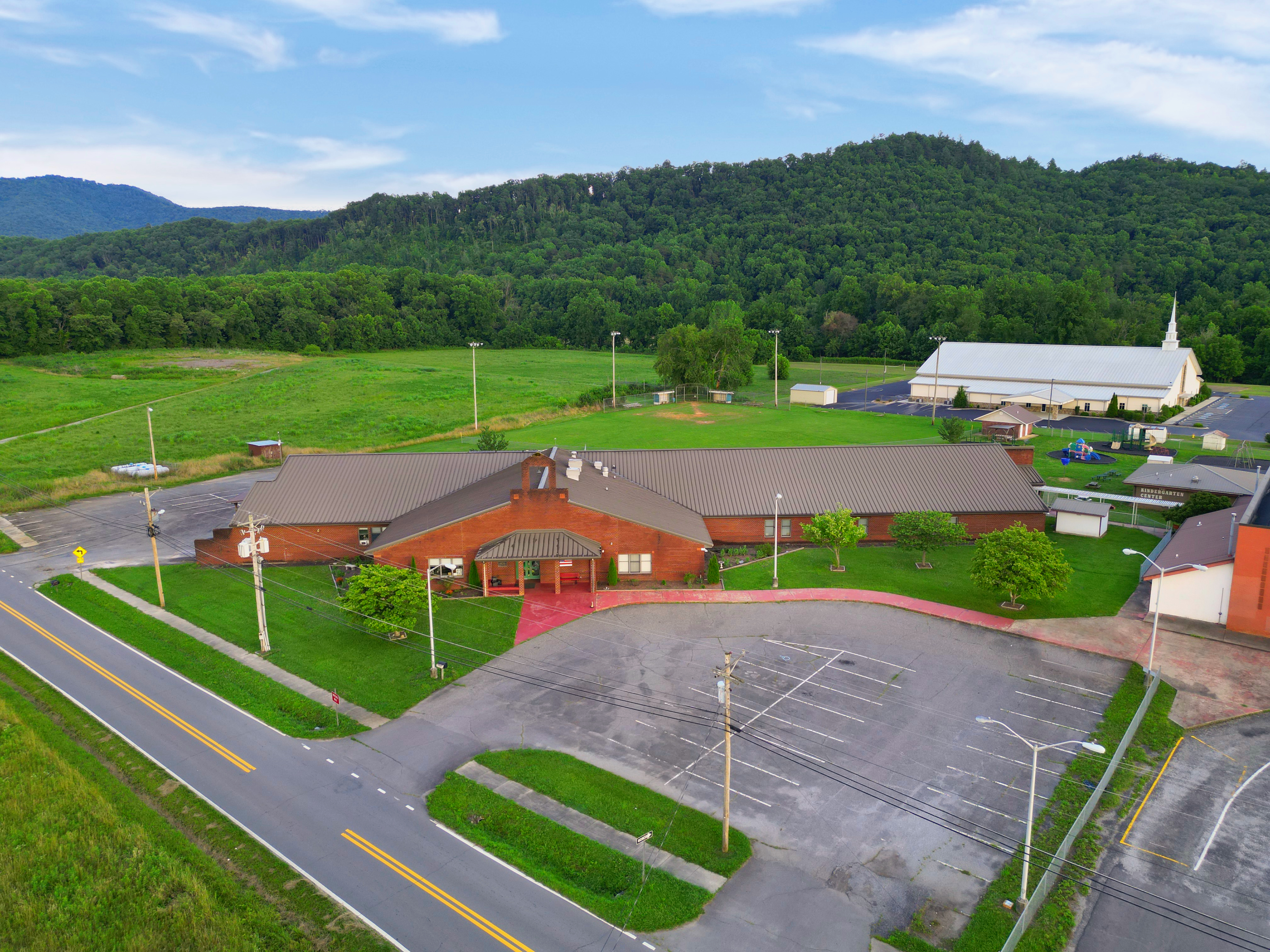
Peachtree Elementary School

Peachtree is home to three of the top-performing public schools in Cherokee County. Peachtree Elementary, Tri-County Early College, and The Oaks Academy each received a B letter grade from the N.C. Department of Public Instruction in 2025. No school in the county received an A. All are operated by Cherokee County Schools. The latter two are located in the Cherokee County Schools of Innovation & Technology facility. The Schools of Innovation facility also houses a Career Academy. As of 2024, Peachtree Elementary had the highest reading and math achievement scores in western North Carolina. According to a 2024 statewide teacher survey, Peachtree Elementary performs worse than other district schools when it comes to robbery/theft, gang activity, vandalism, threats of violence, and weapon possession. Students in Peachtree are part of the Murphy Middle and Murphy High districts.

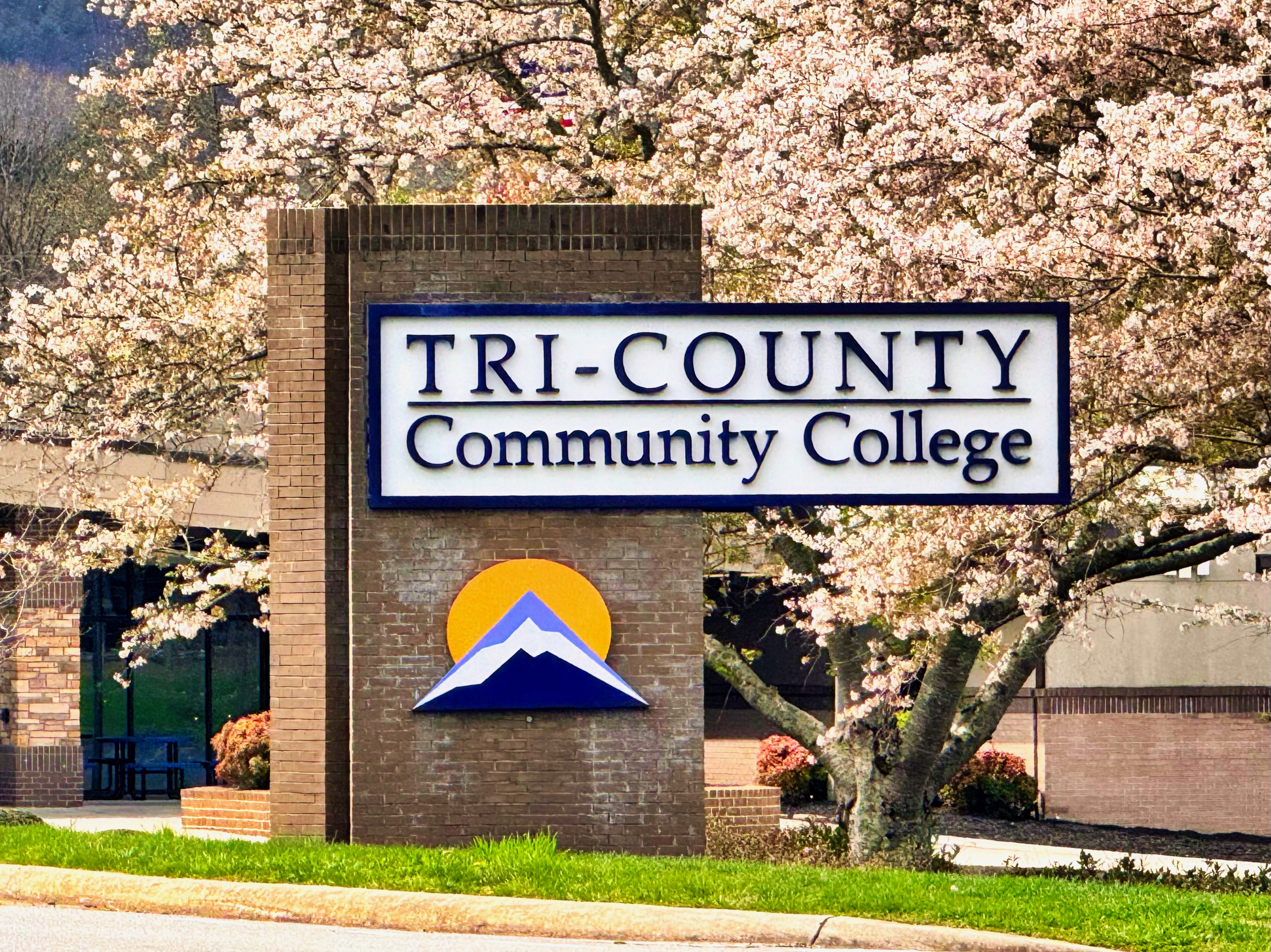
Tri-County Community College in Peachtree

Higher education is offered by Tri-County Community College. Other nearby universities and colleges include North Georgia Technical College, Young Harris College, Western Carolina University, Southwestern Community College, and University of North Georgia.

The John C. Campbell Folk School, the oldest and largest folk school in the United States, is located 2 miles (3.2 km) southeast in nearby Brasstown. The institution focuses on creative folk arts for all ages and offers musical concerts and community dance entertainment.

== Geography ==
Peachtree Creek flows into the Hiwassee River near Peachtree. In 2026, Tennessee Valley Authority released a map showing that approximately 65 structures around Peachtree would be flooded in the event that Chatuge Dam failed.

== Notable people ==
- Steven Woznick – Olympian cyclist who moved to Peachtree around 1976
