= Murphy High School =

Murphy High School may refer to:

- Murphy High School (Alabama), United States
- Murphy High School (North Carolina), United States
