= Murphy Middle School =

Murphy Middle School may refer to schools in:

- Plano Independent School District, Texas
- Cherokee County Schools (North Carolina)
