= Andrews High School (North Carolina) =

American public school in North Carolina

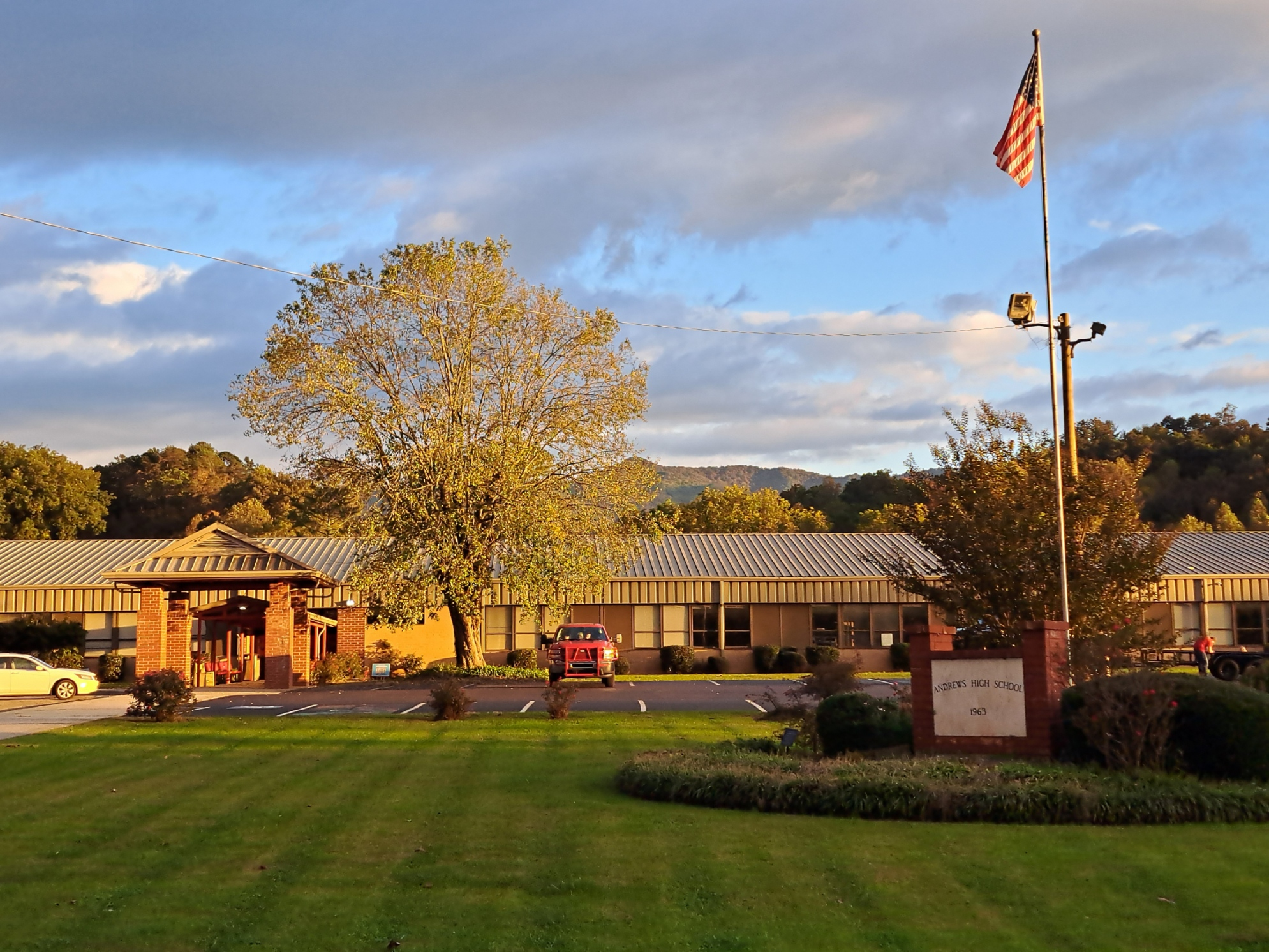
- Andrews High School, October 2025

Location
- 50 High School Drive; Andrews, North Carolina 28901; United States; 35°11′45″N 83°49′27″W

Information
- Type: Public
- Established: c.1890 (136 years ago)
- School district: Cherokee County Schools
- CEEB code: 340065
- Principal: Dorin Oxender
- Staff: 19.14 (FTE)
- Grades: 9–12
- Enrollment: 221 (2023–24)
- Student to teacher ratio: 18.97
- Colors: Black and red
- Fight song: Wildcat Victory
- Athletics conference: Smoky Mountain Conference
- Mascot: Wildcat
- Nickname: 'Wildcat Country'
- Rival: Murphy High School (North Carolina)
- Yearbook: The Wildcat
- Website: ahs.cherokee.k12.nc.us

Andrews High School (AHS) in Andrews, North Carolina serves grades 9–12 and is one of only three high schools in the Cherokee County Schools System. As of 2007 it had a full-time teaching staff of 27 teachers giving an average of 11 students per teacher. In 2024-25 enrollment was 232. The school's capacity is 530. Andrews High School's per-pupil spending is $9,497 per year as of 2025.

The current campus consists of a main classroom and administration building (Building A), a gymnasium and cafeteria building (Designed by Chivous Gilmer Harill, 1962. Built after the original two-story school was burned down months earlier), a third classroom building built in 1970 as the Junior High (now Building B), plus a band & art building (Eric Townson, 1985), and an industrial technology building (Eric Townson, 1987).

== History ==
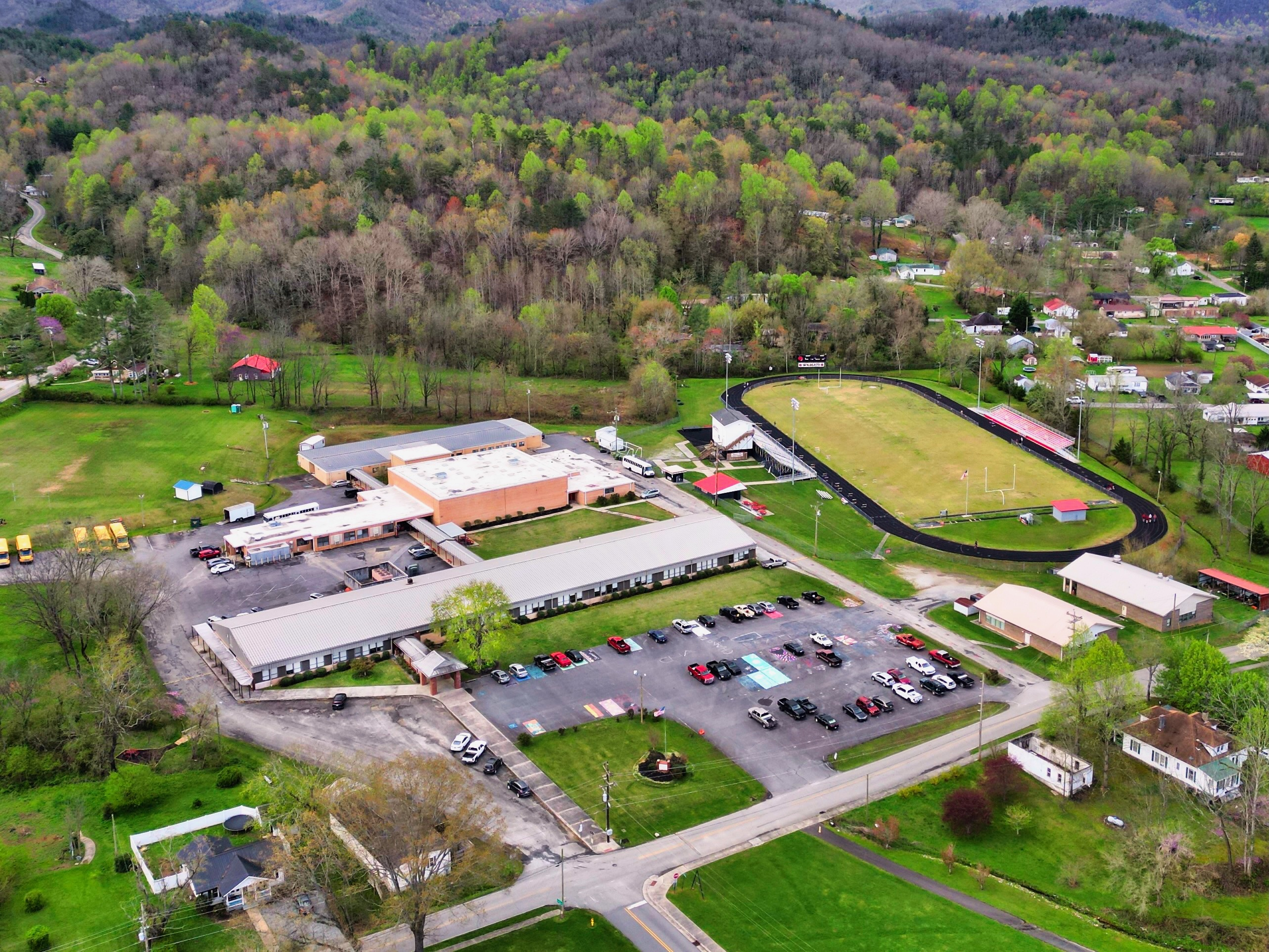
Aerial view of Andrews High School

Andrews High School was incorporated on March 3, 1893, by the North Carolina General Assembly. The school had already been in existence before this date. Andrews High School originally started as a private school and operated that way until around 1915. The first new Andrews High School building was built in 1895. On October 27, 1906, the dedication of the Andrews Public School occurred, and its first classes began in August 1907 in the Masonic Lodge. The building was used until its demolition in the summer of 1961.

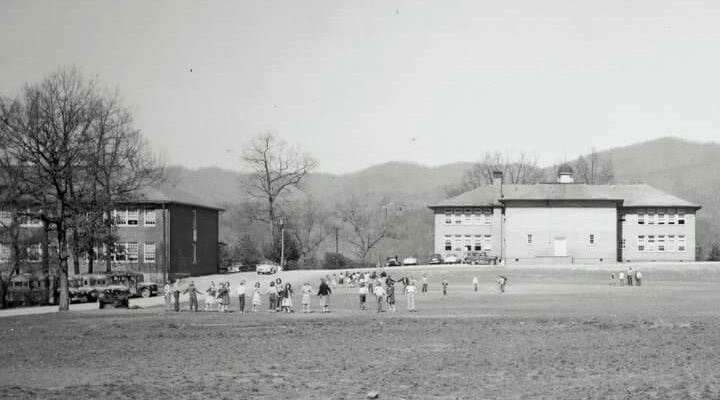
The previous Andrews High School (right) and previous Elementary School (left) buildings. This picture was taken sometime before 1951.

The next Andrews High School facility was built in 1914 and opened in 1915. The building was a two-story facility. The school had parts that the current facility lacks today, such as an auditorium. The building was located on the property of Andrews Elementary on what is locally known as "School House Hill". All of the Andrews schools were located on this hill until 1962.

Andrews fielded its first football team in fall 1929. The team's 50 year anniversary was celebrated October 19, 1979, with original players attending the homecoming game.

In 1952, the first edition of AHS's yearbook, The Wildcat was published.

On Feb. 20, 1962, the two-story brick school building was destroyed by fire overnight. Classes were then held in the town's Baptist and Methodist churches. A new 48,000-square-foot high school building saw one wing open in the spring of 1963 and another wing open later that year. Chivous Gilmer Harrill was the architect for the building. Harrill also designed the Murphy High School campus. The old building's bell is across the street at Andrews Elementary, in the middle of the front driveway loop. In 1970, the Andrews Junior High School building was constructed south of the cafeteria and gymnasium building. This was the first expansion to the current high school campus. In 1973, the school's band program was founded. Miss Mary Byrd, the first director, spent two years organizing the initial Junior High School Band (for grades 7–10), in preparation for expansion into the eleventh and twelfth grades. In 1975, a large mountain cat was stuffed by a taxidermist to become the mascot for the Andrews Wildcats. The band purchased their first uniforms in 1975. In 1977, the band participated in the inauguration of governor Jim Hunt. Today, the band is known as the 'Pride of the Valley' Band. The Hugh Hamilton Stadium was built in 1976. The stadium consisted of two sets of wooden stands on the east and west side, two concession booths (one for athletics and one for the band booster program), a ticket stand, and a press box. The wooden stands were updated to concrete in 1980. Around 1978, the enrollment at Andrews Senior and Junior High was about 600, and the enrollment at the nearby elementary school was of about 800, totaling about 1400. Andrews had a percentage of 64% of graduates who move into higher education, compared to the state average of that time of 30%. 98.6% of that 64% received scholarships or financial aid through the efforts student counselors. In 1978, Andrews was number 3 in the state of North Carolina of scholarship money awarded. Andrews was the top school in North Carolina for placement in summer jobs in 1979. Andrews had up to 8 sports around 1979, which was very high over the usual 2 or 3 sports for a school of its size. Band, art, and chorus were offered at Andrews High School, which was not usually found in schools of small enrollments. Band and art are still offered as electives today. An on-campus masters program was offered at Andrews with the help of Western Carolina University.

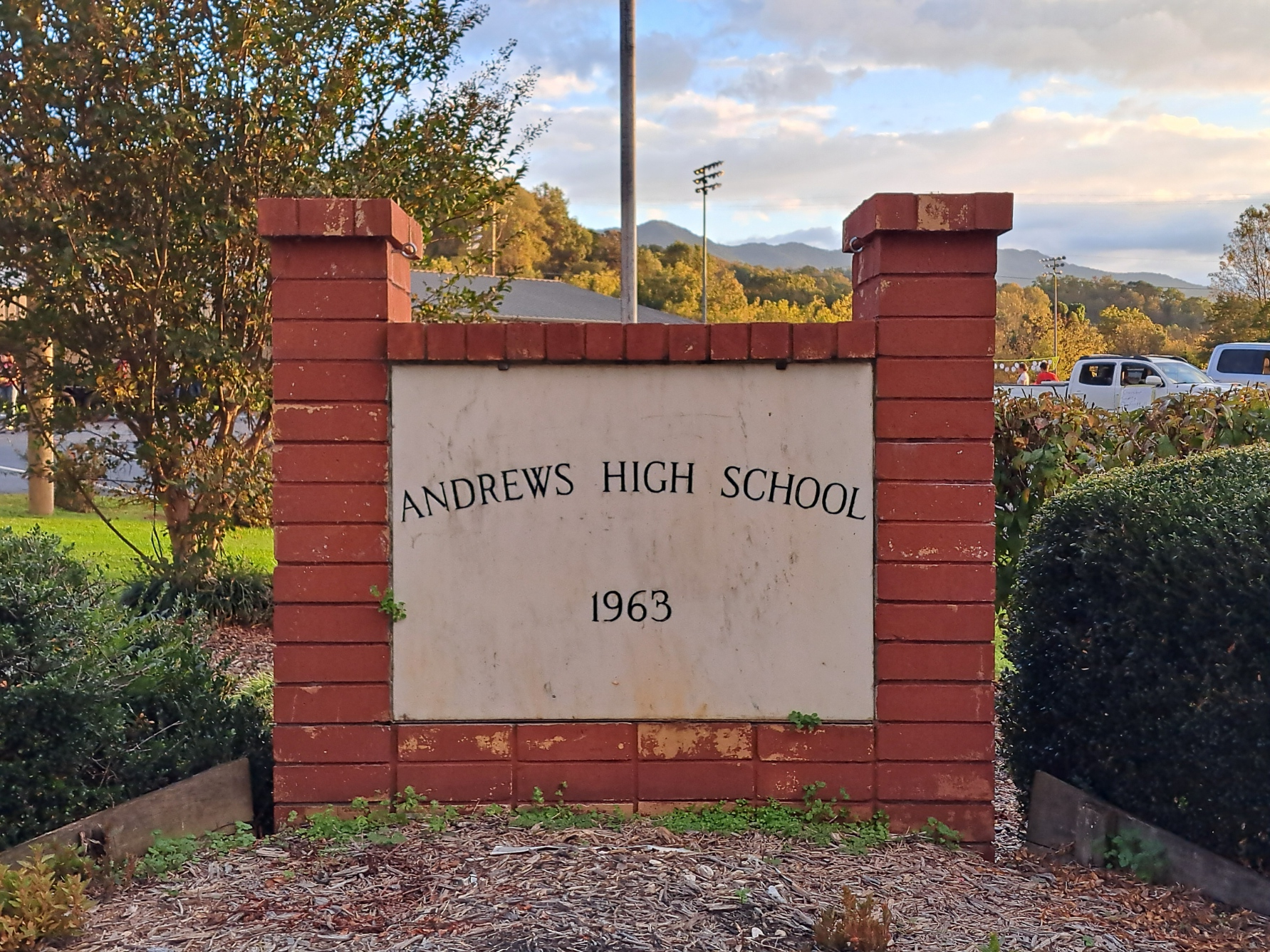
After the original 1914 building burned down in February 1962, a new school was quickly built and opened in 1963.

In 1985, the Band & Art Building was constructed to the northwest of the school. This was part of a project to build Cultural Arts buildings at Andrews, Murphy, and Hiwassee Dam High Schools. In 1987, the carpentry building was constructed next to the Band & Art building. The architect for both buildings was Eric Townson. The Kenneth Moore Track was constructed at AHS in the Hugh Hamilton Stadium in 1990. TVs were also installed in the school in 1990.

In 1992, Andrews High was renovated. Renovations included changing windows in the three main buildings, new entrance doors to the Admin and Gym/Cafeteria building, and new bleachers in the gym. In 2004, Andrews High was once again renovated. The most notable were the exterior changes, as a new roof was built on the main building (Building A), with a gable roof, instead of the previous flat roof, giving the building a taller look. Removal of the skylights in each building occurred. The gymnasium is now the only part of the school with skylights. The ceilings in all the classrooms were lowered. The original stage in the gym was converted into the weight room. Architect for the 2004 renovation was Padgett & Freeman Architects (later PFA Architects and later part of LS3P, who designed Cherokee County Schools of Innovation).

Andrews High operated as a junior and Senior High School from its original opening in 1915 until 1996 when the Andrews Junior High was renamed to Andrews Middle. The name was only recognized the North Carolina Department of Public Instruction until 1999, when the new Andrews Middle facility opened on the east side of town, and the name was officially established. Andrews High was a 7-12 school, and Andrews Elementary held K-6 across the street. The building of Andrews Middle was completed around 1999, and classes at the new school began in August. Andrews High now operates as a traditional 9-12 high school. In the early 2000s, fugitive Eric Rudolph camped 200 yards from the high school and watched the town.

In 2011, the former Junior High School/Middle School building, Building B, had an expansion on the west side and on the north part of the building. On the north part, a large new choral room with two offices was added. The west side of the building had restrooms added.

On January 15, 2016, the school gymnasium was dedicated as the Ken Solesbee Athletic Center, in honor of coach Kenneth Solesbee who was a prominent figure in Andrews' athletic history. The dedication also included naming the court the Ken Solesbee Court, refurbishing of the bleachers, and a repaint of the entrance to the center.

From 1964 until around 1992, graduations were held in the Ken Solesbee Athletic Center. From 1992 onward, graduations have still been held in the Athletic Center, but primarily in Hugh Hamilton Stadium, depending on weather conditions.

In response to the COVID-19 pandemic, Andrews High School did not have a graduation for seniors in the class of 2020. Instead, with Covid relief funding, pictures of the graduates were put up on utility poles in the town from just east of the intersection of Main Street and US-19, to the intersection of Main Street and Wilson Street. This began a new tradition of graduates' portraits and names being put up on each of the 18 poles from the area (most have two on a pole while others have three or four). The banner tradition was originally discontinued for the 2025 school year, citing no more funding for the banners, but only a few hours later, it was announced that the banners would go up with funding from an anonymous donor.

In 1975, a state study strongly recommended consolidating Andrews and Murphy high schools. In May 2020, the Cherokee County Board of Education voted to consolidate Andrews, Murphy, and Hiwassee Dam High Schools. The state awarded a $50 million grant to build a new central high school in Peachtree, but after public outcry newly elected school board members voted to return the money and maintain the status quo.

In October 2025, following the resignation of principal Sheryl Rogers, Ruby Cutshaw & Thomas Graham served as co-interim principals, with Cutshaw serving on Monday, Wednesday, and Friday, and Graham on Tuesday and Thursday. This was an uncommon practice at Cherokee County Schools. It was later announced that Dorin Oxender would serve as the new principal of Andrews High.

== Athletics ==
Andrews' sports teams are known as the Wildcats. The football team plays at the Hugh Hamilton Stadium, track meets are on the Kenneth Moore Track (in the stadium), and basketball and volleyball play in the school's gym, named the Ken Solesbee Athletic Center.

=== Sports teams ===
- Baseball
- Basketball
  - Girls state champs - 1977
- Cross Country
- Football
  - State champs - 1958, 1966, 1967
- Soccer
- Softball
- Track
- Volleyball

=== Facilities ===
Gym, weight-room, showers, track

== Superintendents and principals ==
When Andrews High School operated as a private school, there was a principal. This would change when AHS switched to a public high school around 1905 after the incorporation of Andrews. From 1905 to the merger with Cherokee County Schools in 1969, Andrews High School did not have a principal, but rather the Andrews City Schools superintendent serving that role. The last superintendent before the merger was C. Landrum Wilson.

=== Principals (c.1890-1906) ===
1. James Lovingood (c.1892)
2. Otis C. Huskins (c.1899)

=== Andrews City Schools superintendents (1906-1969) ===
1. John H. Harwood (1906-1911)
2. Herbert Peele (1911-1917)
3. M.T. Edgerton (1917-1921)
4. F.C. Nye (1921-1925/26)
5. J.G. Allen (1925/26-1927)
6. A.B. Combs (1927-1929)
7. C.W.E Pittman (1929-1932)
8. J.J. Stone (1932–1934)
9. A.B. Combs (1934-1935)
10. Isham Barney Hudson (1935–1951)
11. John E. Rufty (1951–1959)
12. Charles Oldridge Frazier (1959–1967)
13. Fred W. Rogers (1967–1968)
14. C. Landrum Wilson (1968–1969)

=== Principals (1969-Present) ===
1. Mack D. Jones (1969–1971)
2. William Roy Pipes (1971–1976)
3. Maynard Brown (1976–1981)
4. William Roy Pipes (1982–1983)
5. Joseph C. Morrow (1983–1988)
6. Stephen Tim Coffey (1988–1997)
7. Mike Rogers (1997–2004)
8. Olin O'Barr (2004–2006)
9. Stephen Tim Coffey (2006–2008)
10. Floyd A Lowman (2008–2009)
11. Virginia Haynes (2009–2015)
12. Dr. Lisa Anderson Fletcher (2015–2021)
13. Lance Bristol (2021–2024)
14. Dr. Sheryl Rogers (2024-10/2025)
15. Ruby Cutshaw & Thomas Graham (10/2025 Interim)
16. Dorin Oxender (10/2025-)

== Notable people ==
=== Alumni ===
- Dave Bristol – Managed the Cincinnati Reds, Milwaukee Brewers, Atlanta Braves, and San Francisco Giants. Attended Andrews High School until his senior year.
- Charles Frazier – National Book Award-winning author. Attended Andrews High School until his junior year. Son of Charles O. Frazier, who was superintendent of Andrews City Schools from 1959 to 1967.

=== Faculty ===
- Jean Christy – Teacher who became the oldest living resident in N.C. and one of the ten oldest living people in the U.S. Christy retired in 1970 from Andrews High School and passed away in 2016 at age 111.
