= Mountain Youth School =

Location
- 4533 Martins Creek Road; Murphy, North Carolina 28906; United States
- Coordinates: 35°01′27″N 84°01′51″W

Information
- School type: Public, Alternative School
- Opened: 1997 (29 years ago)
- Closed: 2017
- School district: Cherokee County Schools
- CEEB code: 342824
- Principal: William Gaither
- Staff: 11
- Teaching staff: 8
- Grades: 6–12
- Age range: 12–18
- Enrollment: 50–65 (varies)
- Classes: Computer App, Masonry
- Student to teacher ratio: 10:1
- Colors: Maroon and white
- Mascot: Mustangs
- Website: sites.google.com/a/cherokee.k12.nc.us/mountain-youth-school/

Mountain Youth School (MYS) was one of a very small group of alternative schools set up by the state of North Carolina for students that would benefit in an alternative classroom setting. It is located in Murphy, North Carolina and serves grades 6–12. It was the only alternative school operated by the Cherokee County Schools. Replaced in 2017, by The Oaks Academy, an Alternative school in Marble, North Carolina. As of 2007 it had an active enrollment of 43 students and a full-time teaching staff of 8 teachers giving an average of 5 students per teacher.

== History ==
In the summer of 1997, the North Carolina General Assembly set forth an allocation of more than $10,000 to establish the Mountain Youth Center. The name was changed in the 2004–2005 school year to Mountain Youth School.

== School improvement plan ==
In 2005, Bill Gaither and several of the staff members set out an improvement plan to address the particular issues plaguing the school:

- Reduction in drop-out rate.
- Faculty and staff need continuing staff development related to alternative settings.
- Reduction in absenteeism.
- Accountability standards are difficult to meet for many students.
- Additional metal building for construction shop and additional classroom space.
- Additional certified staff or full-time staff members to expand curriculum.

== Demographics ==
As of 2010, the school was predominantly non-Hispanic white (83.7%) with 4.7% of the student populace being non-Hispanic black. The school also housed 2.3% Hispanic students and a relatively high percentage of Native American or Alaskan students at 9.3%. There were no students of Asian or Pacific Islander descent.
