= Tri-County Early College =

Tri-County Early College High School
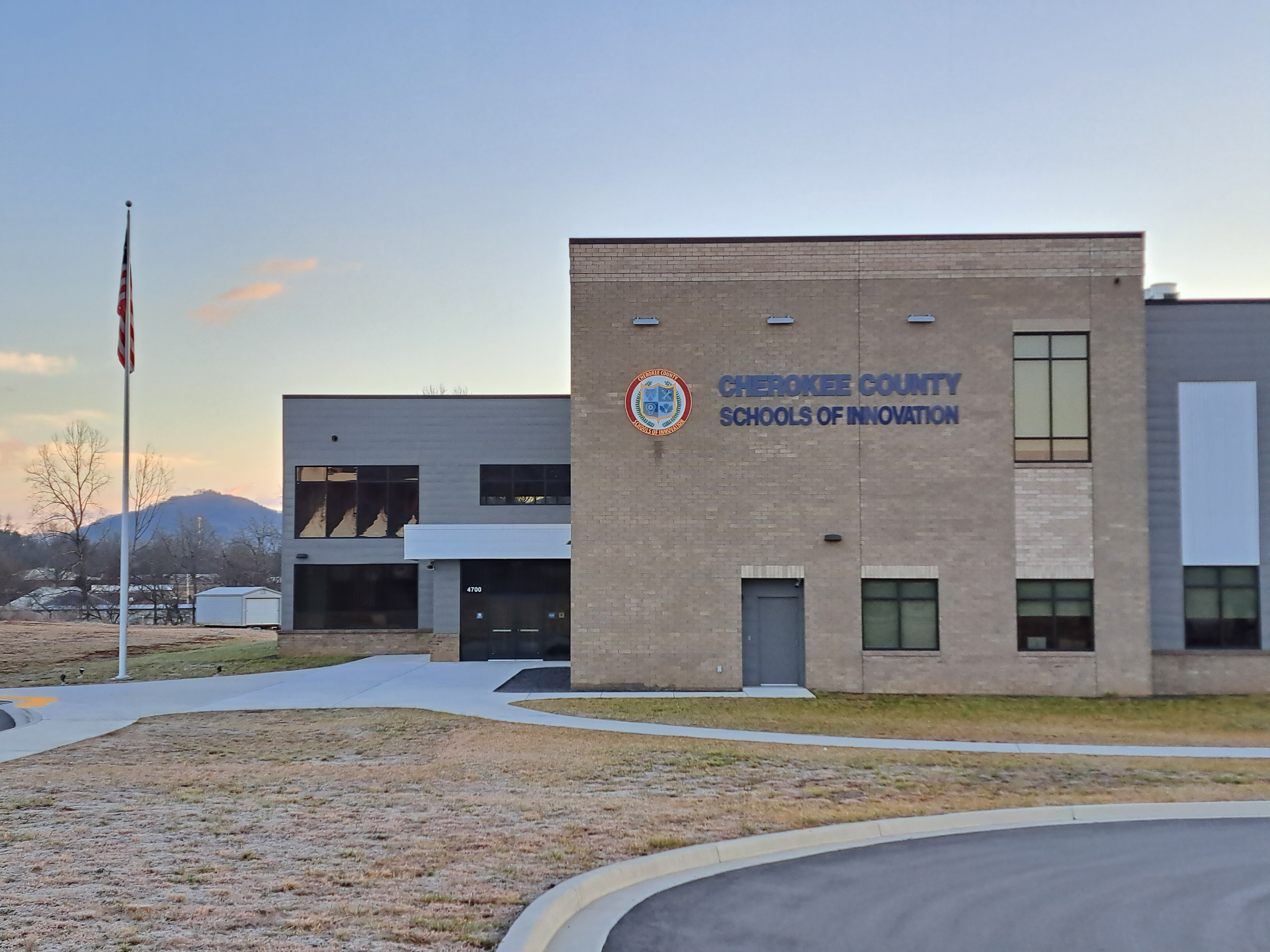
- Tri-County Early College is located in the Cherokee County Schools of Innovation

Location
- 4650 E US 64 Alternate; Murphy, North Carolina 28906; United States; 35.0651°N 83.9679°W

Information
- Type: Public
- Established: 2006 (20 years ago)
- School district: Cherokee County Schools
- CEEB code: 342826
- NCES School ID: 370078002892
- Principal: Jason Forrister (CCSI)
- Staff: 10.83 (FTE)
- Grades: 9–13
- Enrollment: ≈177
- Student to teacher ratio: 14.13:1
- Colors: Blue and orange
- Athletics conference: Smoky Mountain Conference
- Mascot: Jaguar
- Website: tcec.cherokee.k12.nc.us

Tri-County Early College High School (TCEC) in the Peachtree community of Murphy, North Carolina, is a North Carolina Cooperative Innovative High School, part of Cherokee County Schools, but also serves the Clay County School District. Although Tri-County Community College includes Graham County in its service area, TCEC does not. As of 2025 it had a full-time teaching staff of 14 teachers, with an average of 14 students per teacher. In 2024-25 enrollment was about 177. As of 2025, TCEC is rated as one of the top-performing schools in Cherokee County. TCEC's per-pupil spending is $14,265 per year as of 2025.

== Academics ==
Tri-County Early College High School operates under the early college model, allowing students to earn both a high school diploma and a college credential simultaneously. Students are enrolled in a structured four- or five-year program in partnership with Tri-County Community College.

During the first two years, students primarily complete high school coursework while gradually being introduced to college-level classes. By their third year, students begin taking a majority of their courses through the community college, earning transferable college credits.

Students have the opportunity to graduate with multiple associate degrees alongside their diploma, depending on their chosen pathway. The program is designed to reduce the cost of higher education and provide students with both academic and career readiness skills.

== Athletics ==
TCEC's mascot is the Jaguar. In 2025, the school’s cross country program achieved statewide recognition at the North Carolina High School Athletic Association (NCHSAA) 1A championships. The girls’ team finished as the state runner-up, marking one of the highest team finishes in school history.

Individually, Fern Crayton won the 2025 NCHSAA 1A state championship in girls’ cross country with a time of 20:04.55, becoming the first student-athlete from the school to win a state title.

=== Sports teams ===
- Soccer
- Track
- Golf
- Swim
- Cross Country

== Facilities ==
Tri-County Early College High School is currently located on the campus of the Cherokee County Schools of Innovation (CCSI), a facility developed to support both academic and career-focused programs within the district.

The school was previously housed in the Patterson Building on the campus of Tri-County Community College. While no longer housed there, students continue to access college resources through the partnership, including facilities such as the college library and other academic services.

This arrangement allows students to benefit from both a dedicated high school environment and the resources of a community college campus.

== History ==
Tri-County Early College High School was established to expand access to higher education opportunities for students in Cherokee County. It opened in 2006 on the Tri-County Community College campus. With the support of the Bill & Melinda Gates Foundation, TCEC was one of more than 40 North Carolina early colleges created to carry out former Governor Mike Easley's Learn and Earn Initiative. The first principal was Alissa Cheek.

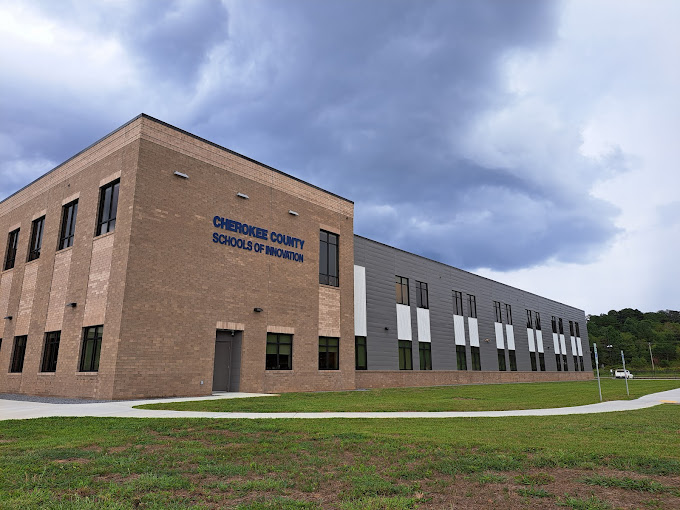
Cherokee County Schools of Innovation in 2023.

In July 2021, a new 66,000-square-foot building broke ground on 27 acres next to Tri-County Community College (TCCC). This building was for the new Cherokee County Schools of Innovation (CCSI), which not only houses TCEC, but also The Oaks Academy (TOA) vocational school, and the Cherokee County Schools Career Academy. The building was designed by LS3P Architects. Alissa Cheek, former principal, was tapped by then superintendent Jeana Y. Conley to be head of the project. Cherokee County Schools hosted a ribbon cutting ceremony on August 22, 2023, for CCSI, in which Cheek and Conley (after her 2022 retirement) attended. Conley and the current chair of the Board of Education Shannon Raper cut the ceremonial ribbon. The new school's first day of classes was August 29, 2023.

Since its founding, the school has grown in enrollment and program offerings, becoming part of the district’s broader Schools of Innovation initiative. The school has continued to emphasize college readiness, workforce preparation, and personalized learning.

In late 2026, the Cherokee Scout reported that private conversations were being held regarding the closure of the School of Innovation to turn the building into a K-8 school for the county.

== Principals ==
1. Alissa Cheek (2006–2021)
2. Jason Forrister (2021-)
