= Cherokee County Schools (North Carolina) =

School district in North Carolina

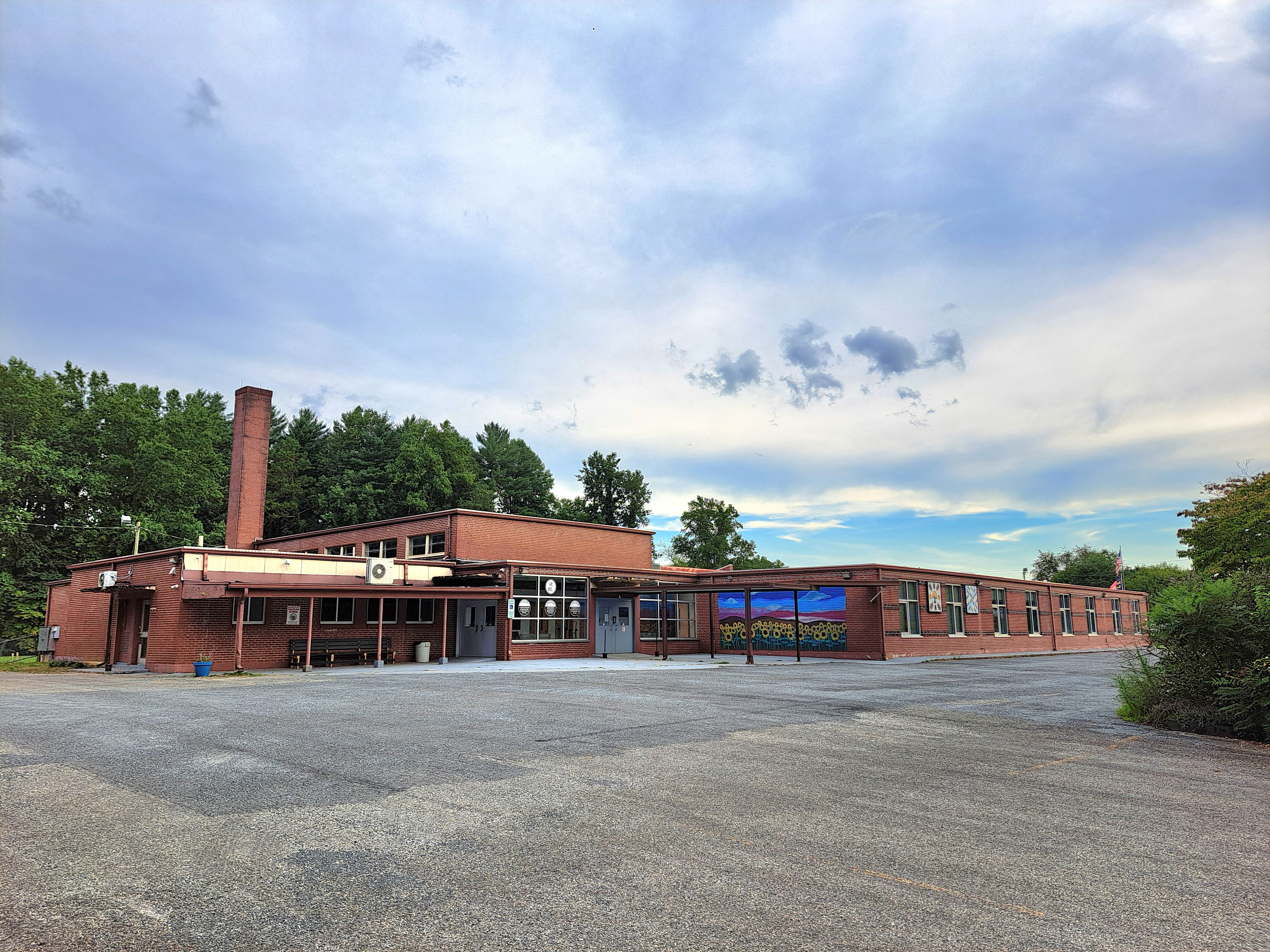
- The CCS Central Office in Marble, North Carolina

Address
- 2230 Airport Road Marble, Cherokee County, North Carolina, 28905; United States

District information
- Motto: Locally Grown, Globally Prepared
- Grades: Pre-K - 12
- Superintendent: Angel Owens
- Asst. superintendent(s): Kim Gibson
- School board: Cherokee County Board of Education
- Chair of the board: Steve Coleman
- Schools: 13
- Budget: $ 40,200,000
- NCES District ID: 3700780

Students and staff
- Enrollment: 3,001
- Faculty: 249.87 (FTE)

Other information
- Website: www.cherokee.k12.nc.us

Cherokee County Schools (CCS) manages the 13 public schools in Cherokee County, North Carolina, United States, with an enrollment of 3,001 students and a 13.25:1 student-to-teacher ratio.

The school superintendent is Angel Owens. As of 2026, base salary for the superintendent position is $130,000. There are currently 7 members in the Cherokee County Board of Education. As of 2025, 13.2 percent of Cherokee County's annual budget goes toward education. Cherokee County Schools' per-student spending is $14,972 as of 2024. In the early-to-mid 2020s, the system has considered further school consolidation. Unless the number of campuses are reduced, the district will go broke in a few years, school board member Steve Coleman told the Cherokee County commission in 2025.

The system's graduation rate is 92 percent as of 2023, higher than the state average of 86.5 percent. As of 2025, just 24 percent of Cherokee County high school graduates are considered "college or career ready." Thirty-six percent of county students are considered "chronically absent" as of 2025. The Cherokee Scout wrote in 2025 that enrollment is generally declining at county schools outside of Murphy and "it is common for young professionals to move across county and state lines to send their children to better-funded schools." The Scout said most of Cherokee County Schools' campuses are "badly in need of repairs and upgrades." As of 2026, Cherokee County Schools has 12 school resource officers.

== History ==
Around 1900, Cherokee County had multiple private schools and schoolhouses. This included schools in the county that no longer exist such as the Ogreeta School or the Friendship School. The first school bus in Cherokee County was purchased in 1926, and served the Andrews community. Cherokee County modernized its school campuses between the late 1940s and early 1960s.

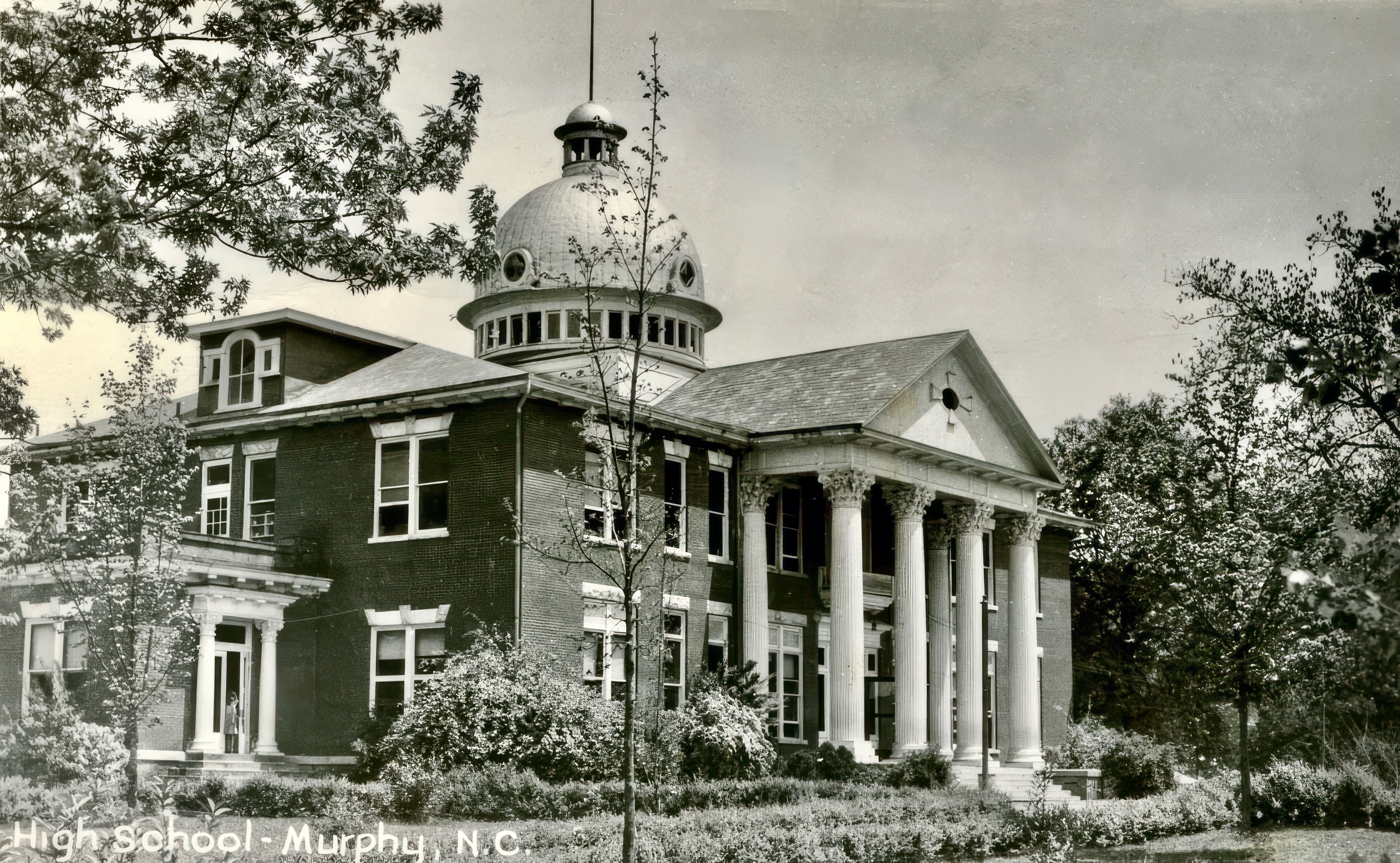
The former Murphy Grammar School was built in 1910

In 1891, the Murphy Public School was opened on the site of the former Providence Hospital. In 1910, the Murphy Grammar School, locally known as the "Dome Building" was opened. In 1925, the second Murphy High was built.

Peachtree Elementary School was built in 1947 after a fire burned the previous 1927 building on February 4, 1945. Classes were held at the Peachtree Baptist Church for the remainder of the school year. The 1947 classroom building was burned in 1986. The 1947 school gym is still standing. The Ranger School opened in 1951. Unaka Elementary School was constructed in 1951 and opened on December 17. The school had reported a lack of students since at least 1971, and the school closed in September 1993. The Andrews Primary School was built in 1952. Marble Elementary School opened in 1956. Later that year, the current Hiwassee Dam School was built and opened. The third and current Murphy High School opened in 1957. After a fire destroyed its previous building in 1962, the current Andrews High School was built. In 1965, a second building was added to the Murphy High School campus. In 1969, Murphy City Schools and Andrews City Schools merged into Cherokee County Schools. John Jordan, then superintendent of Murphy City Schools, became superintendent of Cherokee County Schools.

The 1970s saw development of many of the Cherokee County Schools, especially with the two schools at Andrews and the two at Murphy joining in. In 1970, Andrews High School had its first addition, being the Andrews Junior High School building. That same year, a vocational facility was built at Murphy High. In 1973, after the Andrews Grammar School burned in 1971, an elementary wing was added to the Primary School building. The school was now simply Andrews Elementary. In 1975, octagonal shaped Pre-K/Kindergarten facilities were built at Andrews and Murphy Elementary Schools.

In 1985, Cultural Arts buildings were constructed at the Andrews, Murphy, and Hiwassee Dam High School campuses for each schools band/choral and art programs.

Around 1996, Cherokee County Schools hired Orkan Architecture P.A. of Charlotte to design four new schools, and an expansion piece to Murphy Elementary and Murphy High. The four new schools were Andrews Middle, Martins Creek Elementary, Murphy Middle, and Ranger Elementary. The Martins Creek and Ranger Schools had already existed but both schools were in need of a larger space. Murphy Middle and Martins Creek were built in 1997, Ranger Elementary was built in 1998, and Andrews Middle was built in 1999. Murphy Elementary had classrooms and offices added, and Murphy High had a gym lobby added. This was a $25 million project.

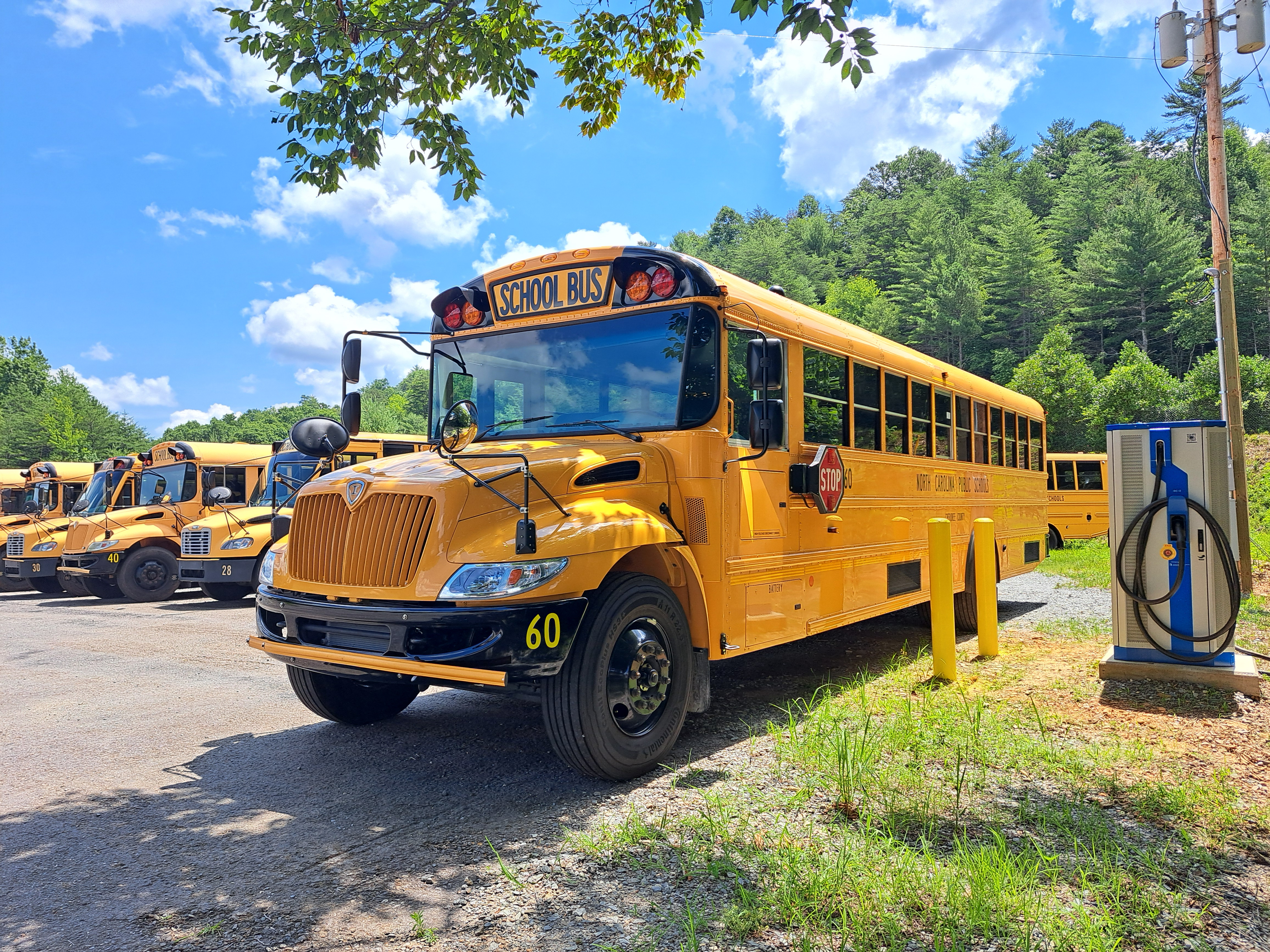
Cherokee County Schools' first electric school bus, a 2024 IC Bus Electric CE Series.

In 2014, superintendent Dr. Stephen Lane was charged with driving while intoxicated and lost his job. He had lost his previous job as superintendent of Davie County Schools due to a DWI charge as well. In 2015, Cherokee County Schools spent more than $700,000 to provide Chromebook laptops to all students in grades 6-12. The system later switched to using iPads. In summer 2024, Cherokee County received its first electric school bus as part of the Environmental Protection Agency’s Clean School Bus Grant Program. That same year Cherokee County Schools' Central Office moved to the former Marble Elementary School building. In 2026, the Cherokee Scout described local school bus service as fraught with complications including buses that were late or canceled and a shortage of drivers. One school board member called it a crisis.

School consolidation has been a controversial topic on county leaders' agendas since the 1970s. A school board member's home was burned down in the early 1970s after the board approved a committee to study the topic. Protests halted efforts to merge Ranger and Hiwassee Dam schools in the 2010s. During 2020 consolidation efforts, death threats were left at a county commissioner's home.

== Schools and facilities ==
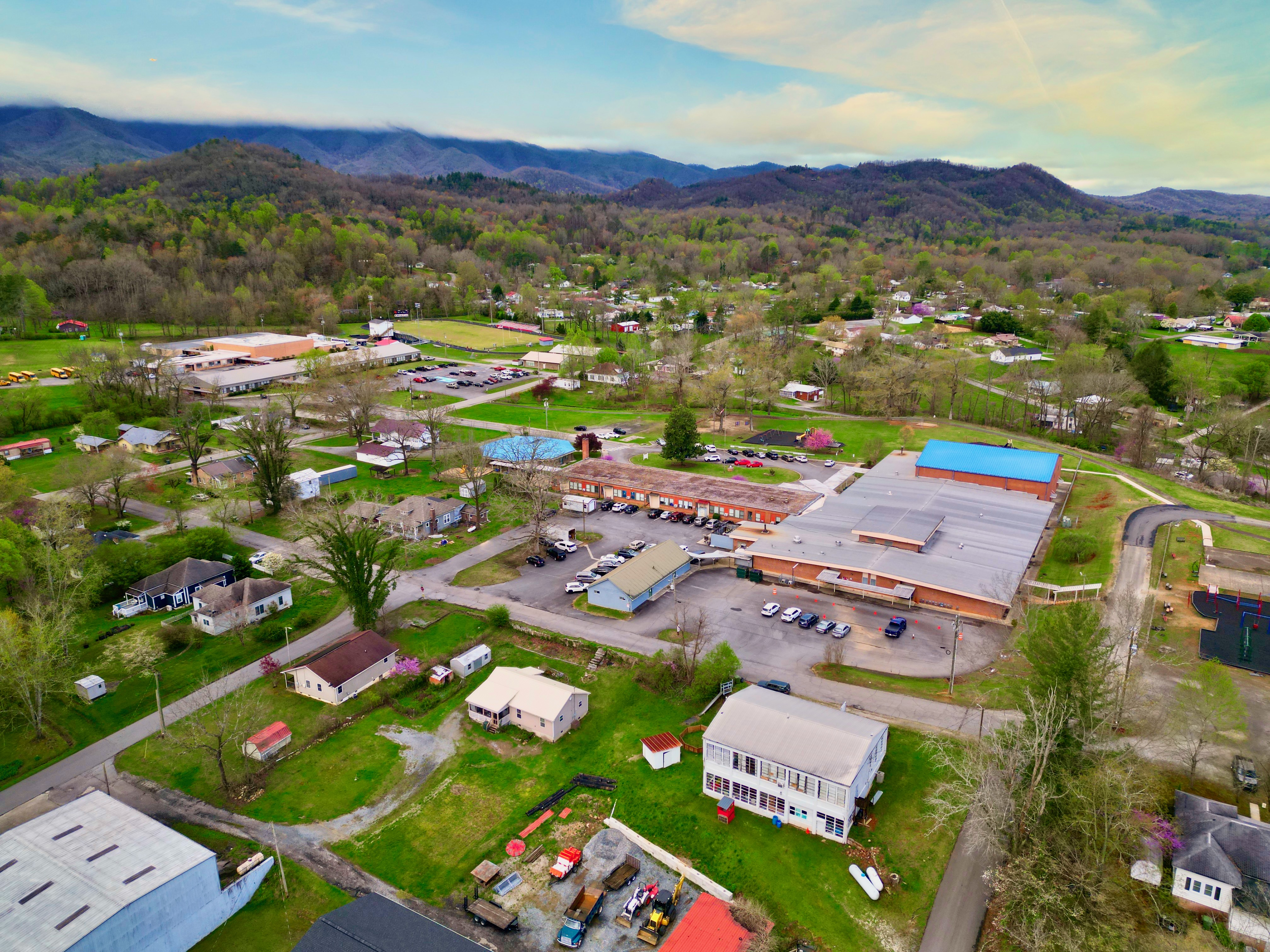
Andrews Elementary School with Andrews High School in the rear left

=== Elementary schools ===
- Andrews Elementary serves Pre-K through 5th grade. The school has an enrollment of 346 students and a capacity of 390 students. The school building was built in 1951 as the Andrews Primary School. The primary school opened in August 1952. The adjacent Andrews Grammar School was destroyed by fire in January 1971 and relocated in 1975 to the Andrews Primary building, making the Andrews Elementary School. The building expanded in 1975 to accommodate the 800 children attending the school at the time. In 2003 a gymnasium was constructed on the west end of the building after the closure of the former 1934 rock gym that closed in 1999 due to the structural problems deeming it unsafe. This cut off a road and created a new hallway system on what was the west entrances. The rock gym was demolished that same year.
- Murphy Elementary School serves grades Pre-K-5 and has an enrollment of 477 students and a capacity of 547 students. The Murphy Primary building was destroyed by a fire in January 1961 and rebuilt. The current facility was used by Murphy High School until 1957. The school expanded in 1998, adding classrooms and offices.
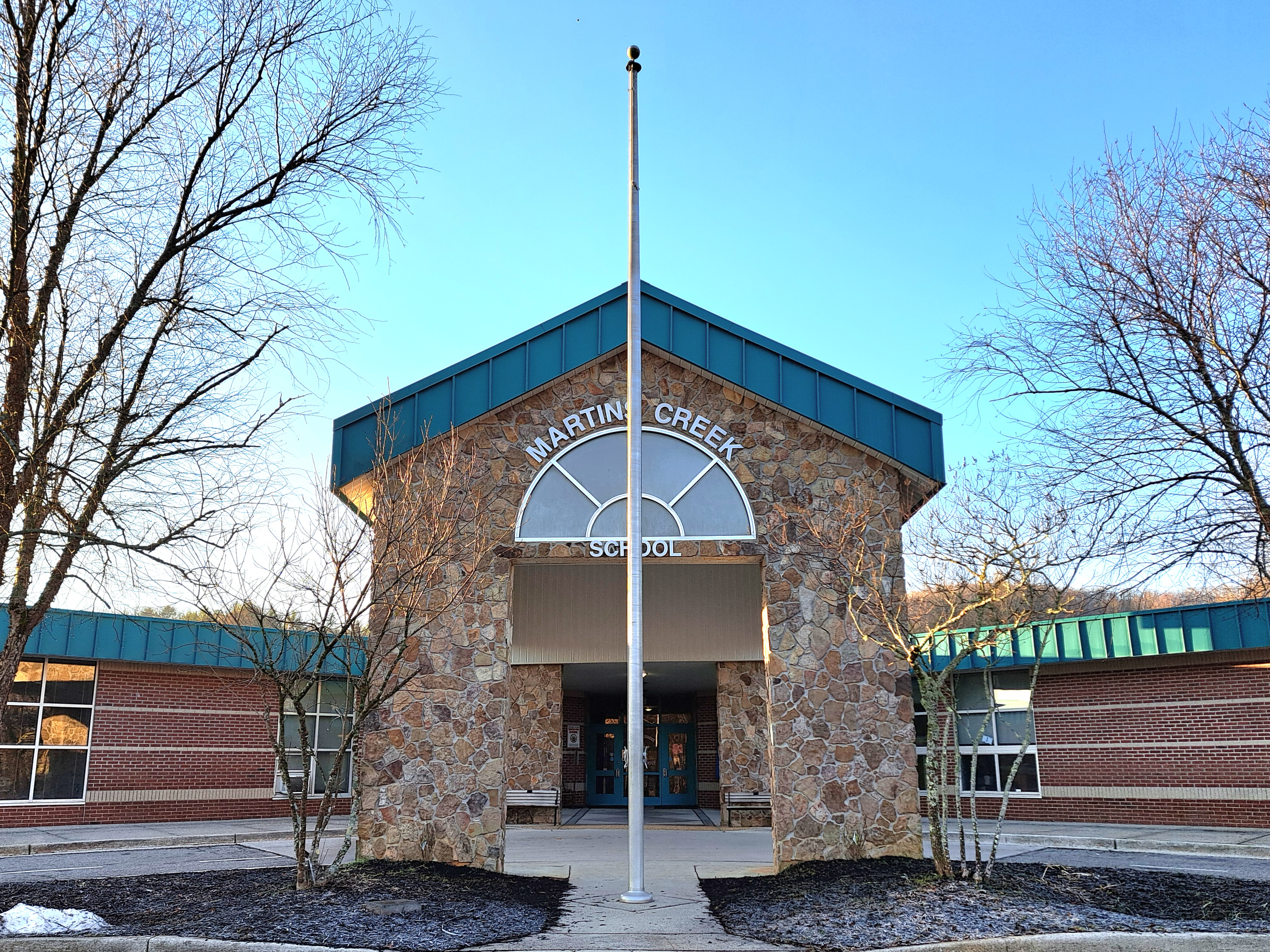
  Martins Creek Elementary in Martins Creek, North Carolina. Built 1997.
- Martins Creek Elementary School (formerly Martins Creek Elementary Middle) serves grades K-5 and has an enrollment of 122. The current school building was constructed and opened in 1997 while the old building about a quarter-mile away was remodeled and expanded for a new school. It is said that a 1993 fire at the former Martins Creek School caused the need for a new facility. The 61-acre campus includes playgrounds, hiking trails, mountain biking trails, and a multi-functional gymnasium. This school served grades K-8 until 2024. As an elementary-middle school, the school received numerous awards and distinctions, including being in the top 25 Schools of Excellence in the North Carolina ABC program, a School of Distinction, a School of Exemplary Growth, and was included in PC Magazine's Top 100 Wired Schools in the nation. It is also one of the few schools in the state to be recognized as achieving exemplary growth every year since the ABCs Program began.
- Peachtree Elementary has an enrollment of 155 students and a capacity of 190 students. The building is the second constructed on its site. The current Peachtree Elementary building was built in 1989.
- Ranger Elementary (formerly Ranger Elementary Middle) offers grades K-5 in Murphy and has an enrollment of 255. The Ranger School opened in 1952. The original building was demolished in 1998 and a new one was built. It was expanded in 2009 to add classrooms. The original architect is Orkan Architecture, PA, and the architect for the 2009 addition is Architectural Design Studio, PA. The addition was designed nearly identical to the design by Orkan Architecture. This school served grades K-8 until 2024.

=== Elementary-middle schools ===
Elementary-middle schools are schools that teach kindergarten, or pre-kindergarten, to the 8th grade. Cherokee County Schools operated 3 elementary-middle schools until 2024 - Martins Creek, Ranger, and Hiwassee Dam. These three schools taught K-8.

On January 18, 2024, Cherokee County's school board voted to move Hiwassee Dam Elementary (K-5 Students) to Ranger Elementary School and move Ranger middle school students to Hiwassee Dam, leaving only Ranger Elementary and Hiwassee Dam Middle School (and High School). They also voted to move Martins Creek Elementary Middle students to Murphy Middle School. The reorganization went into effect for the 2024-2025 school year. In March 2024, the Cherokee Scout wrote that the school board also plans to combine Peachtree Elementary School and Martins Creek School in the 2025-2026 school year.

The school board’s decision to reorganize multiple schools and rezone children ignited heated opposition. The board made the choice without public notice, took no public comment about the changes during that meeting, and did not seek feedback from staff or principals who were there. The Scout reported that multiple citizens and the newspaper itself had difficulty getting any response from school board members. The Cherokee County Board of Commissioners called for a joint meeting with the school board, but the school district did not respond, prompting commissioners to delay approving school projects. In March 2024, the Scout wrote that the school district is “at odds with a growing list of local institutions and individuals that includes county government, the county’s Needs and Solutions Advisory Committee, parents, faculty, staff and even the Cherokee Scout.”

=== Middle schools ===
Cherokee County Schools operates three middle schools, one of which was made into a middle school in 2024.

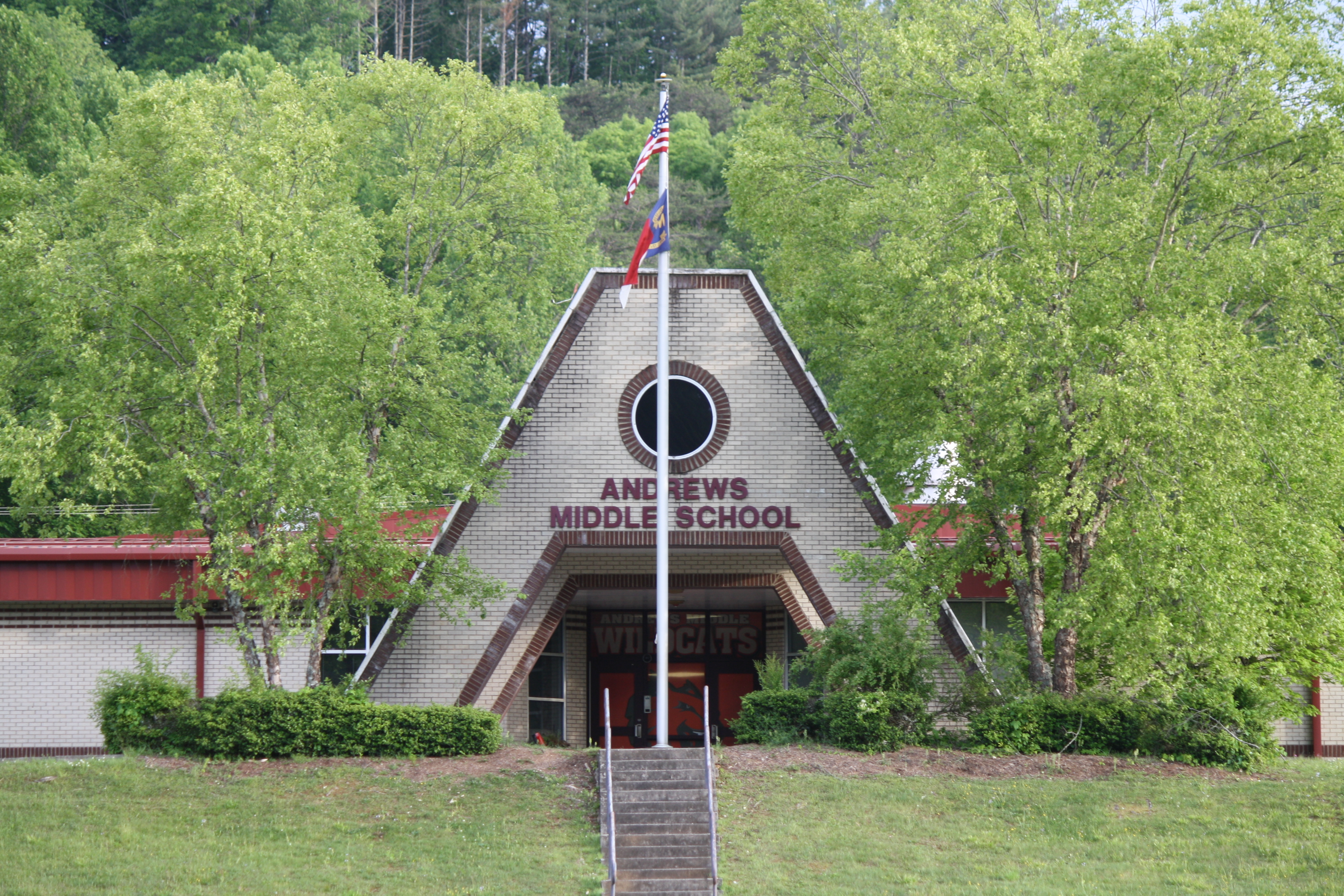
Andrews Middle in Andrews, North Carolina. Built 1999.

- Andrews Middle School in Andrews serves grades 6-8. The school was previously the Andrews Junior High School until 1996. In May, 1998, ground was broken for the construction of a new campus next to the then H.D. Lee plant (now the IOI facility). The new AMS opened on August 9, 1999. As of 2023 it had an active enrollment of 169 students and a capacity of 390 students. As of 2007 it had a full-time teaching staff of 24 teachers.
- Hiwassee Dam Middle School (formerly Hiwassee Dam Elementary Middle) offers grades 6-8 and is located in Murphy. It has an enrollment of 126. It served grades K-8 until 2024.

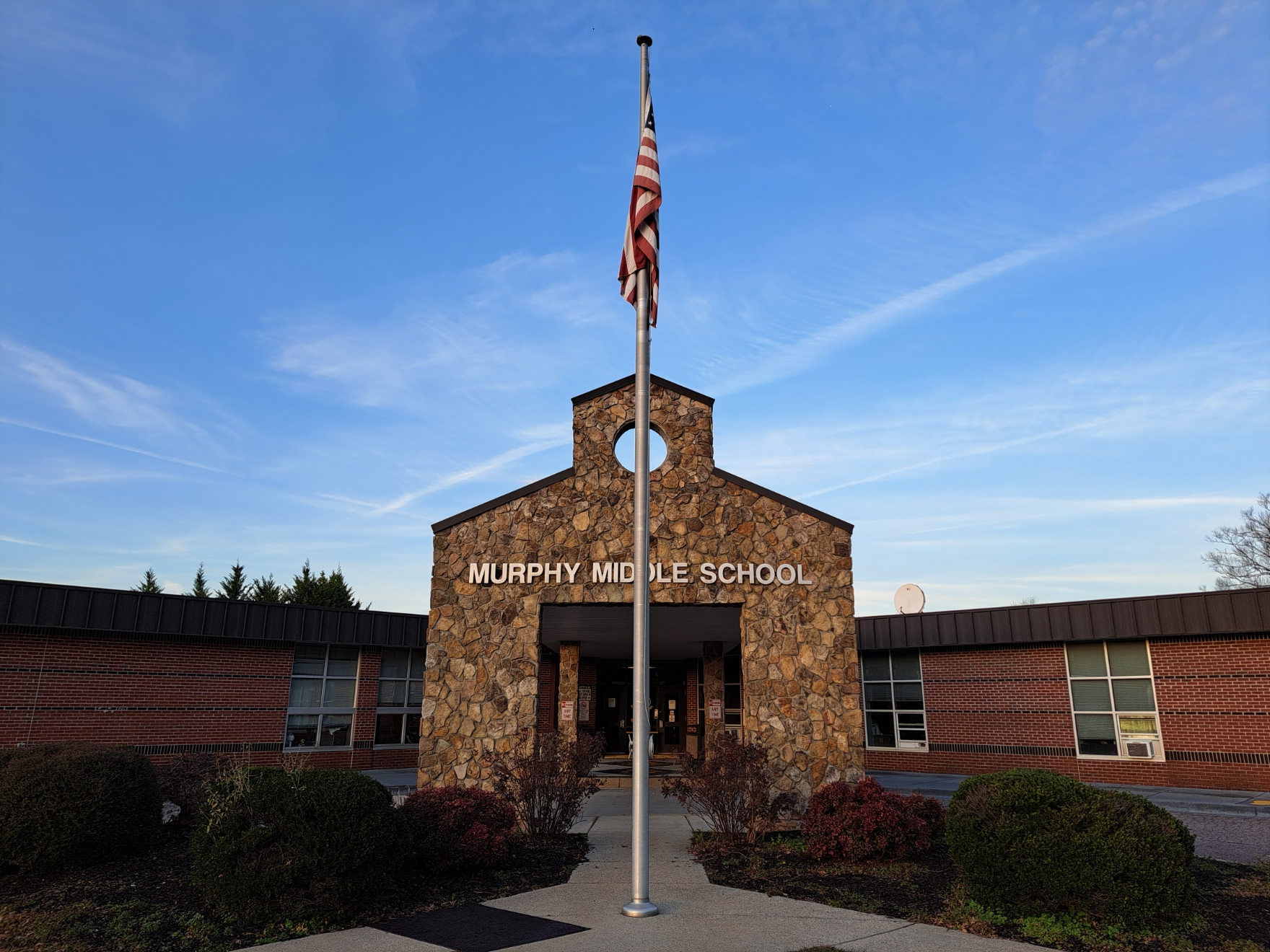
Murphy Middle in Murphy, North Carolina. Built 1997.

- Murphy Middle School is located in Murphy. It serves grades 6-8 and enrolls approximately 360 students. This school was built in 1996 next to the Murphy High School campus. It has capacity of 332 students.

=== High schools ===
Cherokee County Schools operates 3 main high schools in the county, the oldest high school facility being Hiwassee Dam High (1956) and the newest being Andrews (1963). Murphy High School was built in 1957.

- Andrews High School has an enrollment of 232 students and a capacity of 530 students. The school was incorporated in 1893 as a private school. The school became a public school around 1905. It opened its second building in 1915 and was rebuilt after a fire in 1962.
- Murphy High School has an enrollment of 437 students and a capacity of 746 students. The school was built and opened in 1957.
- Hiwassee Dam High School has an enrollment of 139 students and a capacity of 361 students. Its facility, constructed in 1956, is the oldest high school building currently in use in Cherokee County.

==== Consolidation effort (2020-2022) ====
In May 2020 the Cherokee County Board of Education voted to build a new high school near Tri-County Community College in Peachtree to consolidate Andrews High, Hiwassee Dam High School, and Murphy High. In September 2022 the North Carolina Department of Public Instruction awarded Cherokee County Schools a $50 million grant to move forward with consolidation. After public outcry, in January 2023 new members of the Cherokee County Board of Education voted to return the money to the state rather than consolidate the schools.

=== Cherokee County Schools of Innovation ===
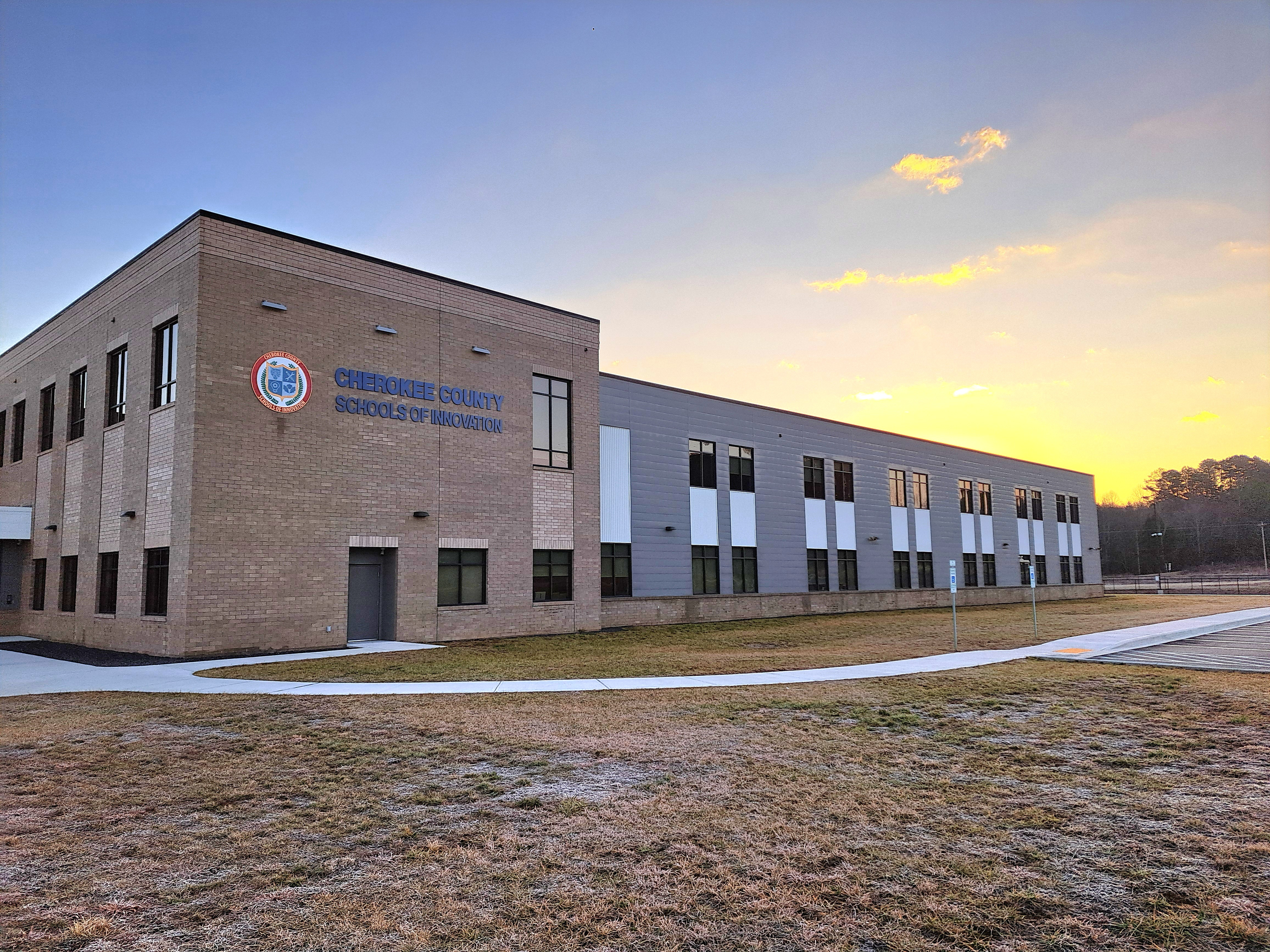
Cherokee County Schools of Innovation. CCS' newest facility.

Cherokee County Schools also operates an alternative school, an early college, and career academy in the newest facility, named the Cherokee County Schools of Innovation. There are three schools in the facility.

- The Oaks Academy is a middle-high alternative school in Murphy. The school was located at the former Marble Elementary School until 2023 when it moved to the Cherokee County Schools of Innovation. As of 2024, the school has an enrollment of 40 students.
- Tri-County Early College was founded in 2006 and has an enrollment of 221.
- Cherokee County Career Academy is part of Tri-County Early College.

=== Former schools ===
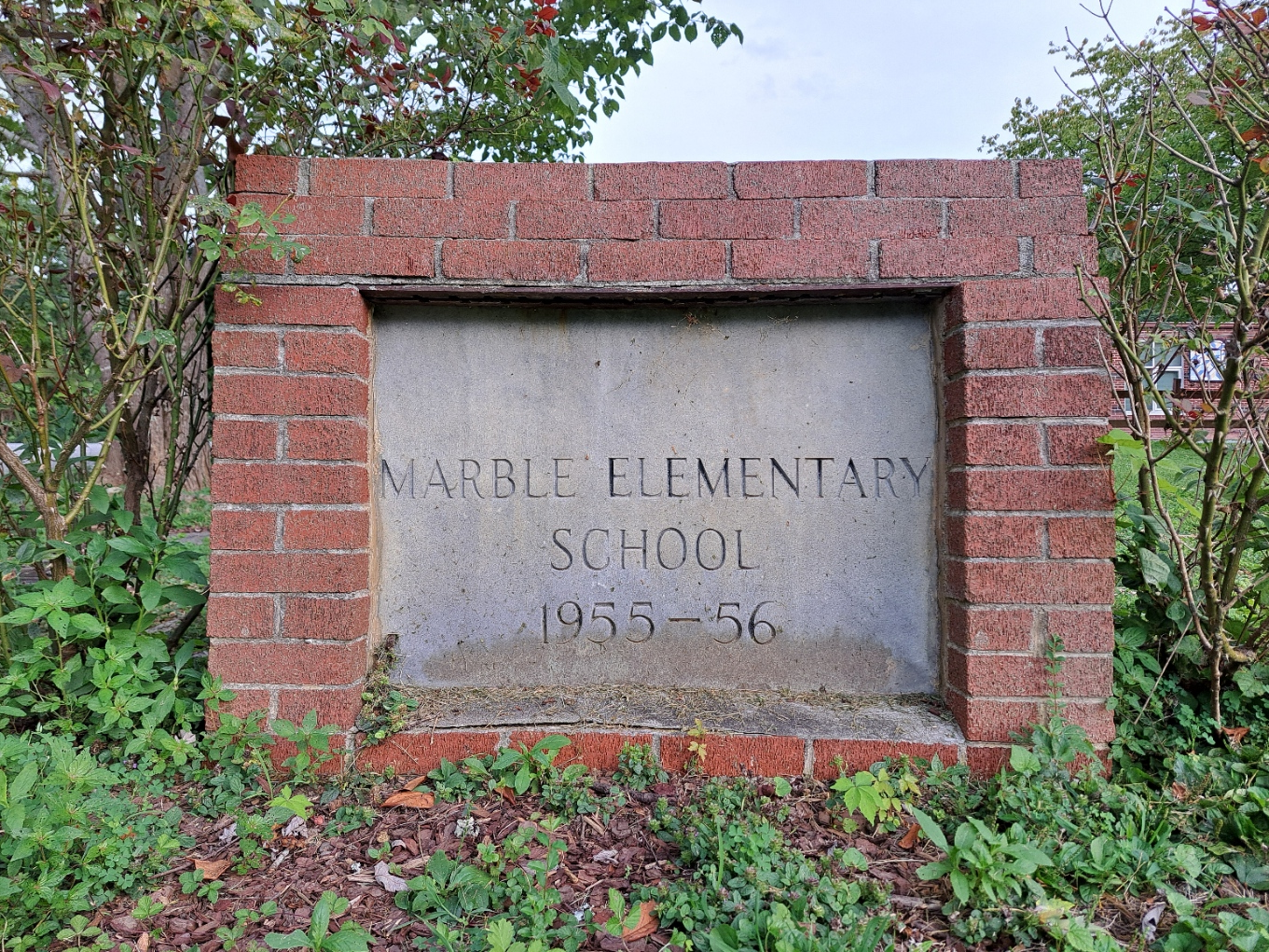
The Marble Elementary School sign

- Marble Elementary School located in Marble. Built in 1956, it is one of the oldest school buildings still standing in Cherokee County. In 2024 it was converted into the Cherokee County Schools Central Office.
- Unaka Elementary School located in Murphy is now the Unaka Community Center. The school closed in September 1993. The school was built in 1952.
- Mountain Youth School was located on the former Martins Creek campus. The school, originally named Mountain Youth Center, was an alternative school for those needing extra assistance in education. In 2017, the school relocated to the former Marble Elementary building and was re-established as The Oaks Academy. In 2023, The Oaks Academy moved to the Cherokee County Schools of Innovation in Peachtree.

=== Other facilities ===
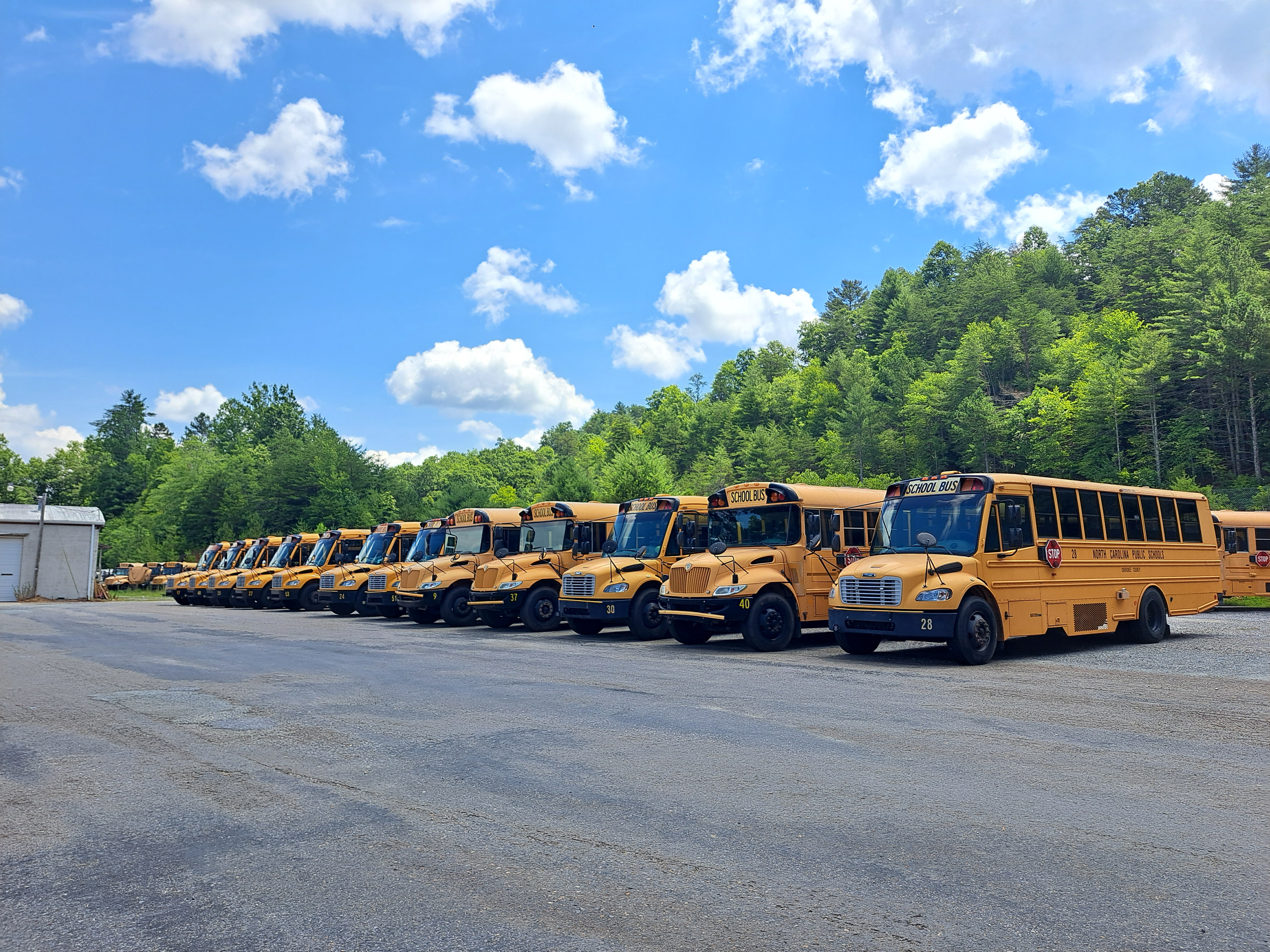
The Cherokee County Schools Bus Garage in July 2024

- The Cherokee County School Bus Garage located near Murphy Middle maintains all school buses for the school district. The garage is a dated building constructed in 1960. Buses have low clearance and low parking space inside the garage due to bus size changes since the garage's construction. Cherokee County has 41 yellow school buses and 20 activity buses, a total of 61. School activity buses for the district were purchased in 1950 by Andrews City Schools, 1966 by Hiwassee Dam School, and 1969 by Murphy City Schools.

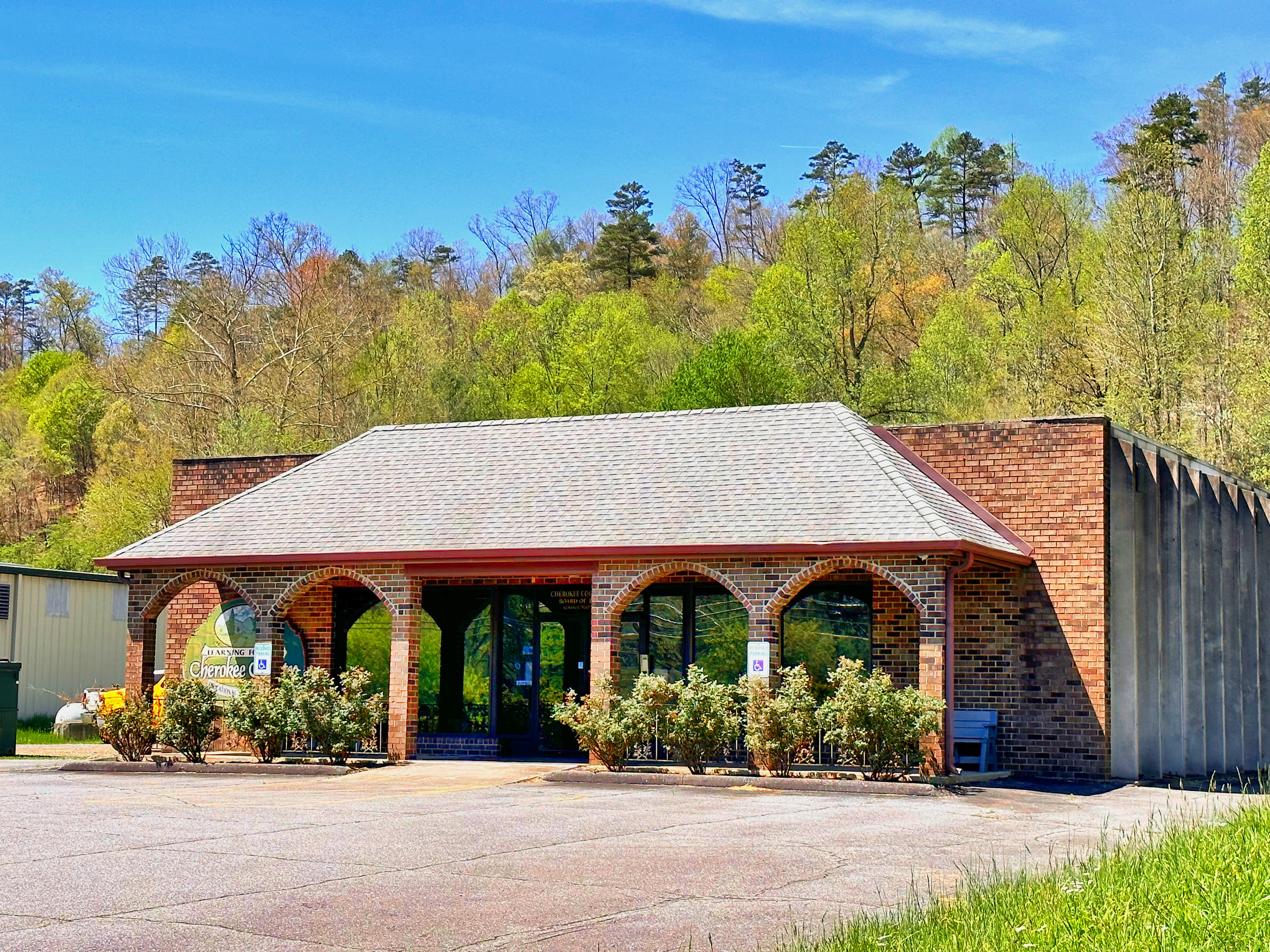
The former main office in Murphy, North Carolina used until 2024

- The Cherokee County Schools Central Office is at 2230 Airport Road in Marble. This is the management facility of all campuses and other facilities owned by Cherokee County Schools. The superintendent, board of education, and other higher staff have offices here. The CCS Transportation office is not located at this facility, but instead located at the district's bus garage. The property is the site of the former Marble Elementary School building. This facility was also home to The Oaks Academy until 2023. The Central Office was previously located next to Murphy High School. When its site was being converted into Murphy Middle School, the office moved to 14 Hickory Street in downtown Murphy. In 2001, Cherokee County Schools started leasing a county-owned facility at 911 Andrews Road. In 2024 CCS was evicted and moved to its present location at the former Marble Elementary School.

==== Demand to surrender Central Office property (2024) ====
On May 23, 2024, the Cherokee County Board of Commissioners unanimously voted to make an alternative use for CCS's Central Office at 911 Andrews Road. The board gave CCS until August 2, 2024, to surrender and vacate the property. A statement from the letter given to Cherokee County Schools on May 24:

"Should Cherokee County Schools fail to vacate the premises by the 2 August 2024 at 5 p.m., Cherokee County Government reserves the right to seek summary ejectment..."

The above statement tells Cherokee County Schools that if they had not vacated the property before August 2, then they would have been evicted. An offer was made to Cherokee County Schools by the Board of Commissioners to use the former National Guard Amory at 188 James A. Mulkey Drive. Now a county-owned facility, the building is stated to have a comparable size to the current office. The county was willing to give funds for any renovations to the building for CCS's move. It was also stated that the Board of Commissioners will be glad to take any requests for other properties CCS would like to use for their Central Office and that they would still fund the renovations. CCS had previously considered using the Marble Elementary campus as a central office before the eviction notice. The Central Office moved to the Marble campus in late July 2024.

=== General info of CCS Facilities ===
Facility/Campus	Constructed (Current)	Current Facility Opened	Original Opening	No. Facilities on Campus	Architect
Andrews Elementary School (AES)	1952-2003	1952	1952	4	Lindsey Madison Gudger (.3 (Primary School piece)), Eric Townson (1.3 (1975 Expansion and Pre-K Bldg), Architectural Design Studio, PA (.3 (2003 Expansion),
Andrews Middle School (AMS)	1998	1999	1999	1	Orkan Architecture, PA
Andrews High School (AHS)	1962-1987	1963	c. 1890	5	Chivous Gilmer Harrill (3), Eric Townson (2)
Cherokee County Schools Bus Garage	1960	1960	1960	1	Unknown
Cherokee County Schools Central Office	1955-1976	2024	Unknown	1	Lindsey Madison Gudger, Unknown
Cherokee County Schools of Innovation (Facility) (CCSI)	2021-2023	2023	2023	1	LS3P Architects
Cherokee County Schools Career Academy (CCSCA)	CCSI	2023	2023		CCSI
Hiwassee Dam Middle School (HDMS)	1956-1987	1956	1939	2	Donald Greene, Eric Townson
Hiwassee Dam High School (HDHS)	1956-1987	1956	1939	2	Donald Greene, Eric Townson
Martins Creek Elementary School (MCES)	1997	1997	c. 1940s	1	Orkan Architecture, PA
Murphy Elementary School (MES)	1952-1998	1957	1922	2	Green and Robelot (Original), Orkan Architecture, PA (Addition)
Murphy Middle School (MMS)	1996	1997	1997	1	Orkan Architecture, PA
Murphy High School (MHS)	1957-1998	1957	c.1900	5	Chivous Gilmer Harrill (1), Unknown (3), Eric Townson (1) Orkan Architecture, PA (Addition)
Peachtree Elementary School (PES)	1947-1989	1989	1800s	3	Lindsey Madison Gudger (1), Unknown
Ranger Elementary School (RES)	1998-2009	1998	1952	1	Orkan Architecture, PA, Architectural Design Studio, PA (Addition)
The Oaks Academy (TOA)	CCSI	2023	2017		CCSI
Tri-County Early College (TCEC)	CCSI	2023	2006		CCSI

== Superintendents ==
1. Avery L. Martin (1903-1939)
2. Lloyd Hendrix (1939-1969)
3. John Jordan (1969-1983)
4. William R. Pipes (1983-1987)
5. Dr. Donald W. Bentley (1987-1995)
6. Gary Steppe (1995-2002)
7. Dr. Jeanette F. Hedrick (2002-2008)
8. Dr. Stephen E. Lane (2008-2014)
9. Dr. Jeana Y. Conley (2014-2022)
10. Dr. Keevin G. Woody (2022-2026)
11. Angel C. Owens (2026-Present)
