= Hiwassee Dam High School =

American public school in North Carolina

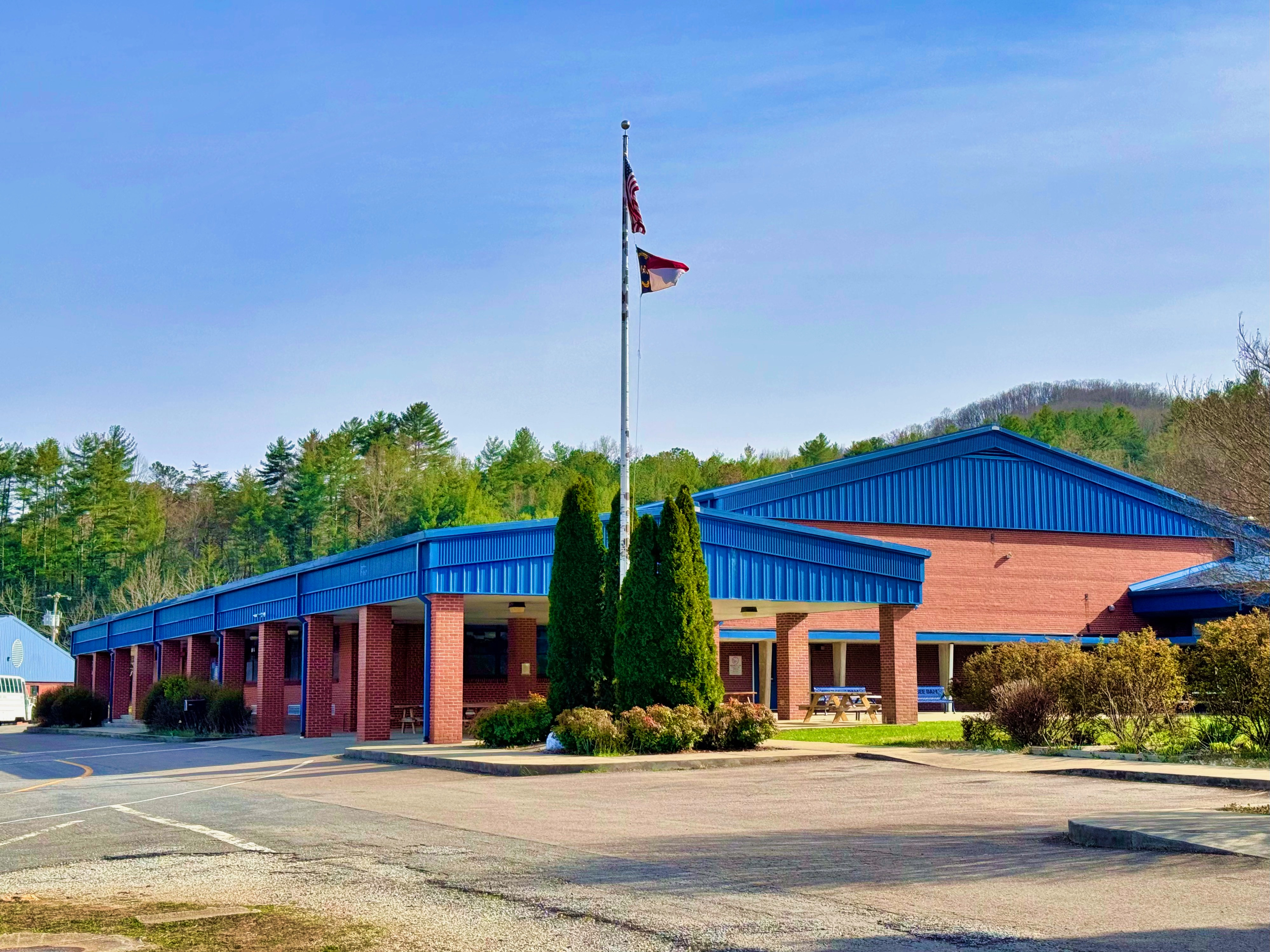
- Hiwassee Dam High School, March 2024

Location
- 267 Blue Eagle Circle; Murphy, North Carolina 28906; United States; 35°06′13″N 84°13′24″W

Information
- Type: Public
- Established: 1939
- School district: Cherokee County Schools
- CEEB code: 341880
- Principal: Daniel McNabb
- Staff: 16.32 (FTE)
- Grades: 9–12
- Enrollment: 147 (2023–24)
- Student to teacher ratio: 11.03
- Colors: Blue and white
- Athletics conference: Smoky Mountain Conference
- Mascot: Eagle
- Website: hdhs.cherokee.k12.nc.us

Hiwassee Dam High School (HDHS) in Murphy, North Carolina serves grades 9–12 and is one of three high schools in Cherokee County Schools. It is the westernmost public school in the state of North Carolina. As of 2007 it had a full-time teaching staff of 20 teachers giving an average of 11 students per teacher. Enrollment is 139 students. The school's capacity is 361 students. Hiwassee Dam High School's per-pupil spending is the highest in Cherokee County at $20,263 per year as of 2025.

== History ==
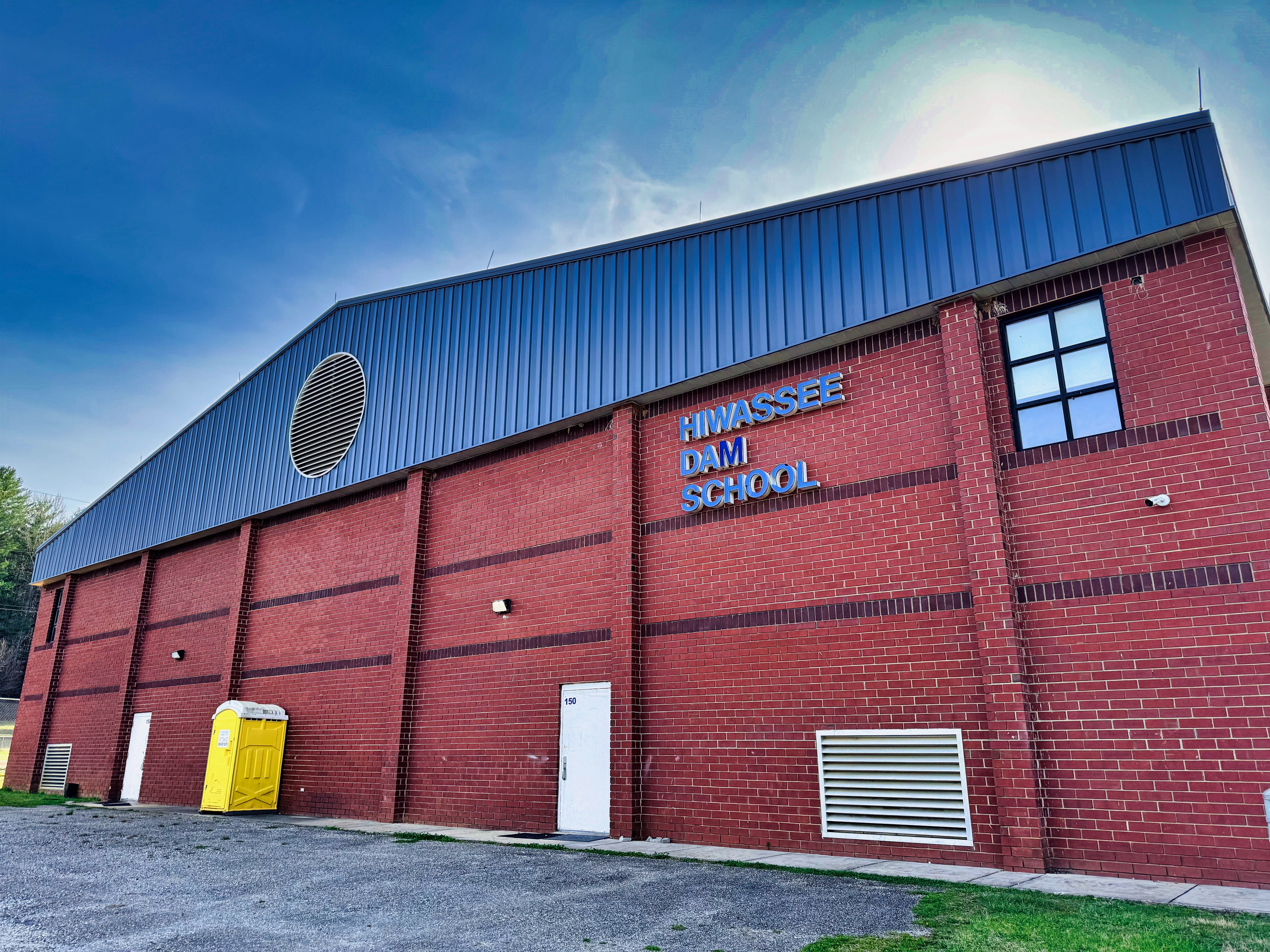
Hiwassee Dam school gymnasium

Hiwassee Dam School started as a public school in Cherokee County in fall 1939. It began in buildings used by the Tennessee Valley Authority during the construction of Hiwassee Dam. Four schools, Reid Chapel, Hill, Postell, and Shearer, were consolidated to create Hiwassee Dam School. During its first year in operation, there were 312 students and eight teachers. N. O. Kilpatrick was the first principal. High school classes were not taught until fall 1940.

In the mid-1940s, Clark School was consolidated into Hiwassee Dam School. Around 1954, Violet School was consolidated with Hiwassee Dam. In fall 1956, Hiwassee Dam School moved into a new 22-classroom building. The new building provided space for Friendship Elementary School to consolidate with Hiwassee Dam and for Ranger Elementary School students to attend high school at Hiwassee Dam. At that time the school had 21 teachers and 570 students. In 1982, the girls basketball team won the state championship.

In 2004, the entire HD facility was renovated. New roofing was installed and windows were redone. Architects were Padgett & Freeman Architects and the contractor was Wells & West.

Hiwassee Dam had a band program, including a marching band. In May 2019, the band program was cut by the school board, with the band director's contract not being renewed, citing the student numbers were not enough to warrant the position based on state guidelines for class sizes that did not take into account that the director was a K-12 instructor, rather than just a 9-12 instructor. The program had 10 days to appeal, but the appeal was not accepted and the band program consolidated with Murphy High School's band.

In May 2020, the Cherokee County Board of Education voted to consolidate Andrews, Murphy, and Hiwassee Dam High Schools. A $50 million state grant was given to the school system in September 2022 to accomplish this goal. After public outcry, in January 2023 new members of the Cherokee County Board of Education voted to return the money to the state rather than move forward with the consolidation.

== Awards and distinctions ==
| Year | Award |
|---|---|
| 2005 | North Carolina School of Distinction |
| 2006 | North Carolina School of Progress |
| 2007 | Bronze Medal School |
| 2008 | Bronze Medal School |
| 2009 | Bronze Medal School |

Hiwassee Dam High is rated as one of the top-performing schools in Cherokee County as of 2025. As of 2023, HDHS had the highest graduation rate of any high school in the county – 97 percent.

== Principals ==
1. N.O. Kilpatrick (1939–1940)
2. Bascom D. Carroll (1940–1941)
3. Harvey H. Ferguson (1941–1943)
4. Walter B. Thomas (1943–1947)
5. James T. Osborne (1947–1953)
6. Hal M. Hale (1953–1955)
7. Harest E. King (1955–1968)
8. William R. Sudderth (1968-1985)
9. Michael C. Rogers (1985-1989)
10. Ernest T. Jones (1989-1998)
11. Dr. Sue Lynn Ledford (1998-2004)
12. Kenny Garland (2004-2010)
13. Thomas Graham (2010-2016)
14. Daniel McNabb (2016–Present)

== See also ==
- List of high schools in North Carolina
