= Murphy High School (North Carolina) =

American public school in North Carolina

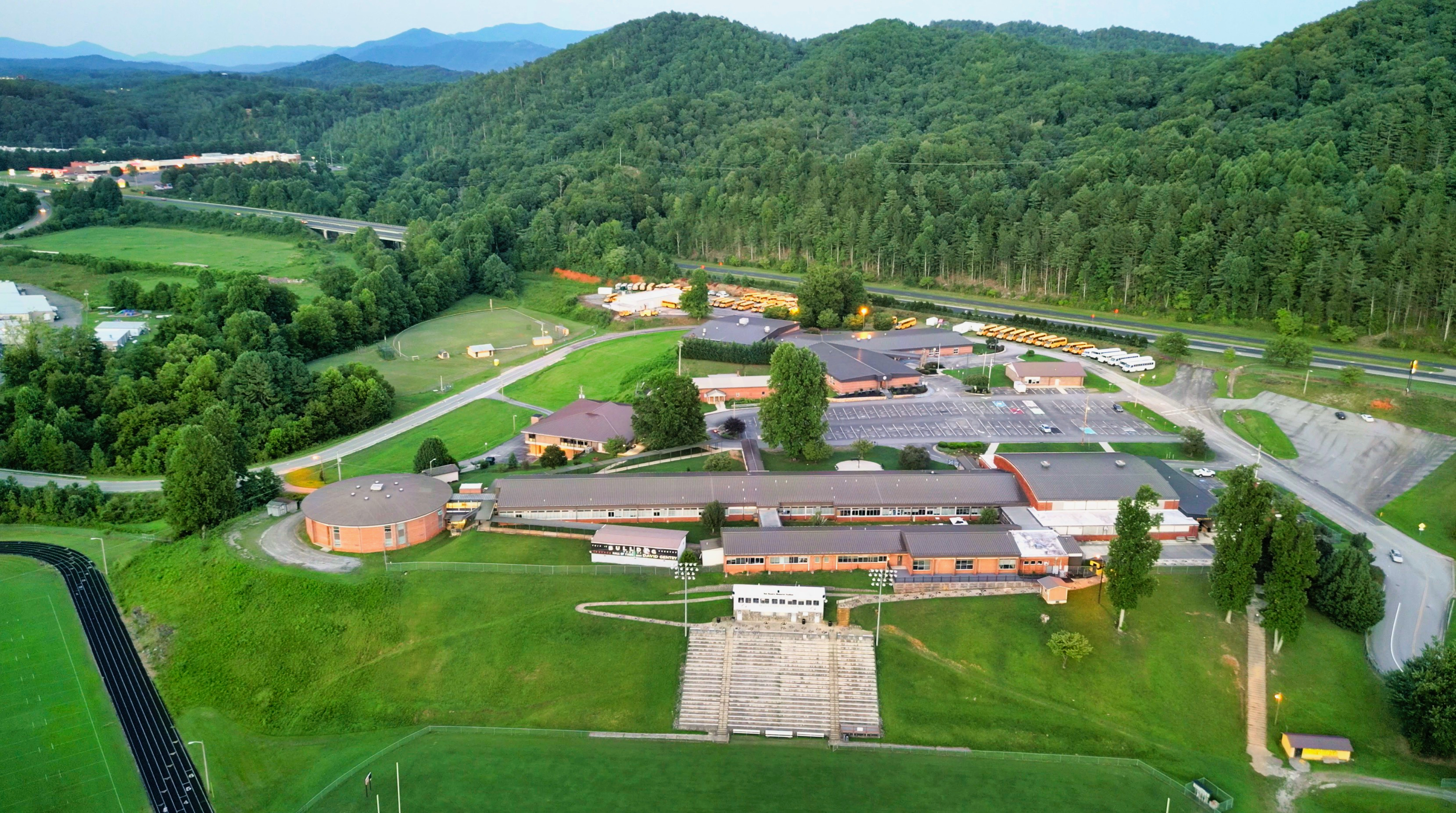
- Aerial view of Murphy High School, August 2022

Location
- 234 High School Circle; Murphy, North Carolina 28906; United States; 35°06′01″N 84°00′59″W

Information
- Type: Public
- School district: Cherokee County Schools
- CEEB code: 342825
- Principal: Wendy Leatherwood
- Staff: 20.29 (FTE)
- Grades: 9–12
- Enrollment: 424 (2024–2025)
- Student to teacher ratio: 20.90
- Colors: Black and gold
- Athletics conference: Smoky Mountain Conference
- Mascot: Bulldog
- Nickname: 'Bulldog Country'
- Team name: Bulldogs
- Rival: Andrews High School (North Carolina)
- Newspaper: The Boomerang
- Yearbook: Kanusheta (1953-Present), The Bulldog (Until 1952)
- Website: mhs.cherokee.k12.nc.us

Murphy High School (MHS) is a public high school in Murphy, North Carolina. It serves grades 9–12 and is the largest of three high schools in the Cherokee County Schools system. The MHS campus is sandwiched between U.S. Route 19 and the Valley River. The high school shares its campus with Murphy Middle School and the Cherokee County Schools Bus Garage. As of 2007 the school had a full-time teaching staff of 42 teachers giving an average of 12 students per teacher. Murphy High School's per-pupil spending is $10,079 per year as of 2025.

Murphy High School is rated as one of the top-performing schools in Cherokee County as of 2025. It has a GreatSchools rating of 5/10 and an average community rating of 4/5 stars. In the 2024–25 school year, 437 students were enrolled. The school has a capacity of 746 students. Drug and tobacco use at MHS is “significantly higher” than at other schools in the district (83% versus 33%), according to a 2024 statewide teacher survey. In addition, physical student conflict was observed by 61% of MHS teachers compared to 35% of educators across the district.

== History ==
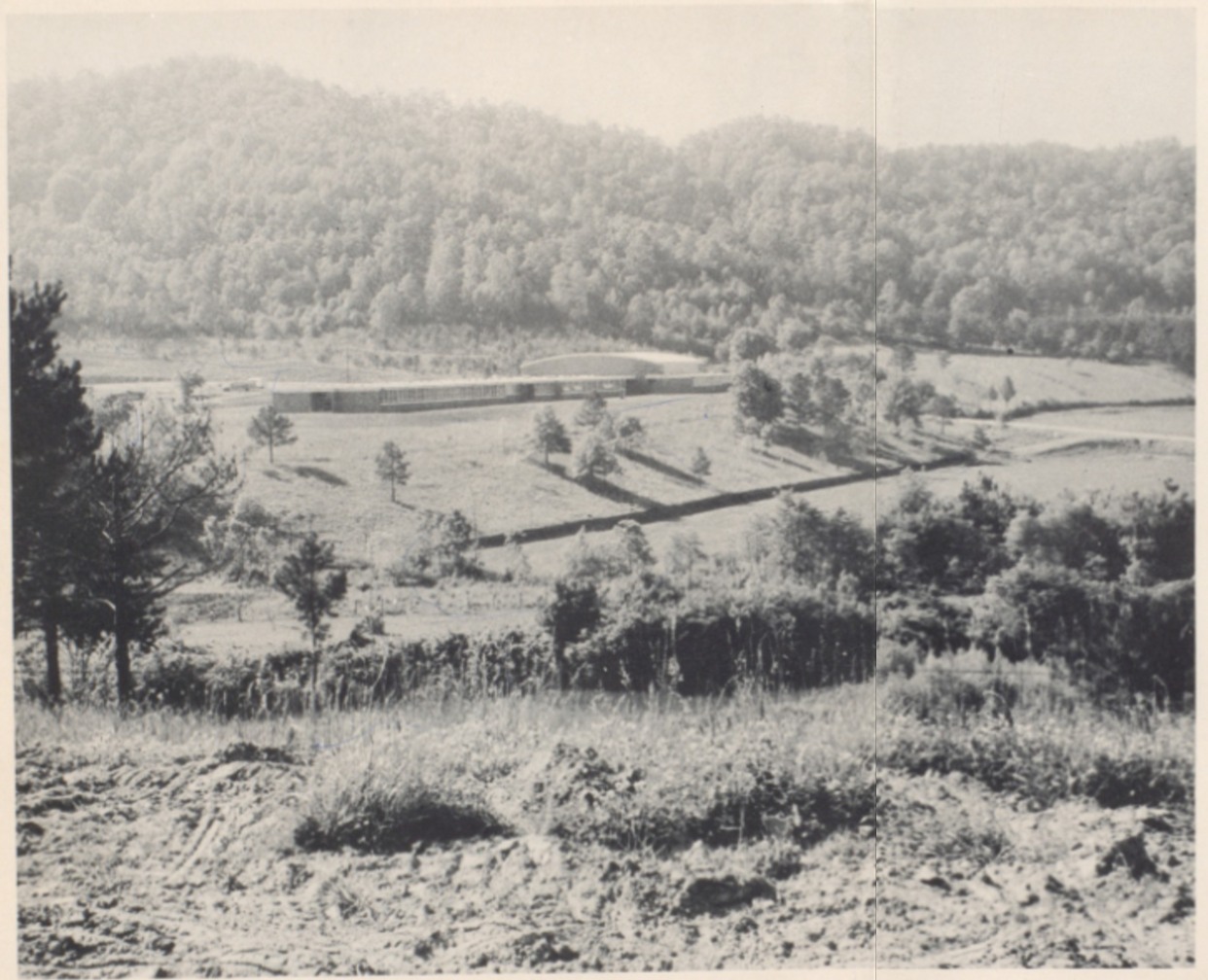
Murphy High School in 1957, shortly after its opening of the current campus.

The original Murphy High School building was located on the former Providence Hospital site and had opened in 1891 as the Murphy Public School. The next Murphy High was built in 1925. The 1925 campus is now where the current Murphy Elementary School campus is. The old building plot is near the current Pre-K building. The next campus was built in 1952. The facility is now the current Murphy Elementary School building. Both the 1925 and 1952 buildings were used for high school classes until 1957. The current campus opened in 1957 on 219 acres as Murphy Senior High School. Construction cost $259,143. The architect was Chivous Gilmer Harrill who also designed Andrews High School.

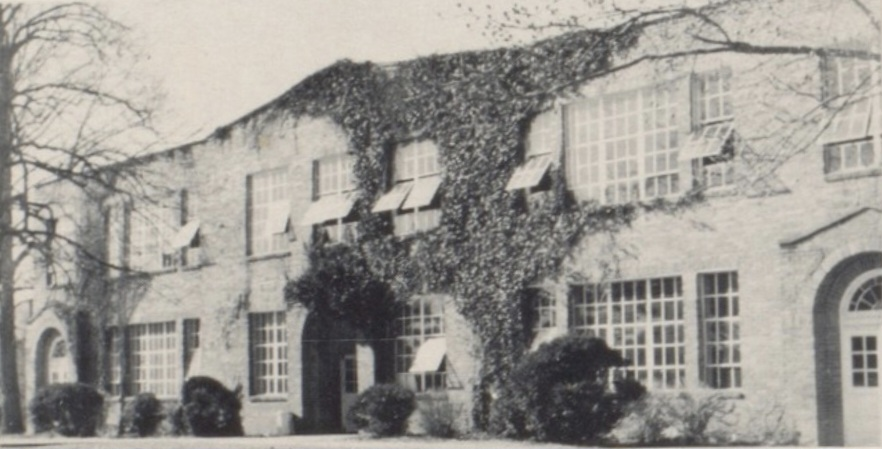
The Murphy High School built in 1925.

The original mascot for Murphy High School was the Boomers. The Boomer was a red squirrel. The change from the Murphy Boomers to the Murphy Bulldogs happened on October 23, 1938.

In 1953, the first edition of MHS's yearbook, the Kanusheta, was published. "Kanusheta" is the Cherokee word for "dogwood" or "dogwood blossom". Prior to 1953, the yearbook was known as The Bulldog.

In 1975, a new, $600,000 vocational building was built on the school's campus. In 1985, the band building was constructed. The building was part of a project to install Cultural Arts buildings at Andrews, Murphy, and Hiwassee Dam High Schools. Architect was Eric Townson. In 1998, renovations were done to Murphy High School, as well as additions around the gymnasium. South of the gym, a new lobby and offices were added and a new hallway at the main entrance of the school was added to connect the two main buildings. The architect was Orkan Architecture, PA, who designed Murphy Middle, an addition for Murphy Elementary, and many other schools in the county. The base design was near identical to the schools.

An EF2 tornado damaged Murphy High School, Murphy Middle School, and the CCS Bus Garage during the tornado outbreak of March 2–3, 2012. The schools were temporarily forced to close as a result.

In 1975, a state study strongly recommended consolidating Andrews and Murphy high schools. In May 2020, the Cherokee County Board of Education voted to consolidate Andrews, Murphy, and Hiwassee Dam High Schools. In September 2022, a grant of $50 million was given to the school system for this purpose, but in January 2023 new members of the Cherokee County Board of Education voted to return the money instead.

Murphy High School continues to be housed in one of the oldest school buildings in the county. “Practically all of Murphy High School is in need of dramatic repairs and improvements or a complete replacement altogether,” the Cherokee Scout newspaper wrote in 2023. Constructing a new Murphy High School would cost $115.2 million according to a 2025 school board study.

Murphy High was voted as the best school in Cherokee County in the Scout's 2023 and 2026 Readers' Choice awards.

== Athletics ==
Murphy's teams are known as the Bulldogs. The football team plays at Bob Hendrix Memorial Stadium. Murphy competes in the Smoky Mountain Conference (SMC) and its varsity sports are:

- Baseball
- Basketball
  - Girls state champs - 1995, 1997, 2020, 2021
- Cheerleading
- Cross Country
  - Boys state champs - 1994
  - Girls state champs - 1990, 1991, 1994, 1995, 1996, 1997, 1998, 2000
- Football
  - State champs - 1974, 1986, 1987, 1991, 1996, 2011, 2013, 2016, 2018, 2020
- Golf
- Track
  - Girls state champs - 1990, 1995, 2018, 2019
- Soccer
- Softball
- Swimming
- Volleyball
- Wrestling

== Superintendents & Principals of Murphy High ==
Unlike the Andrews City School District (1906–1969), having the superintendent also serve as principal of the high school, Murphy High School had both a principal for the high school and superintendent for the Murphy City School District. The principal and superintendent would have both of their offices in the same building.

=== Superintendents of Murphy City Schools (1891-1969) ===
1. Hieronymus Bueck (1932–1957)
2. Holland McSwain (1957–1965)
3. John Jordan (1965–1969)

=== Principals of Murphy High School ===
1. Charles Forrester (1969–1985)
2. Robert W. Hendrix (1983–1998)
3. Dr. William Sugg (1998–2003)
4. Jerry M. Brackett (2003–2010)
5. Boyd Shields (2010–2016)
6. Thomas Graham (2016–2018)
7. Jason Forrister (2018–2021)
8. Dr. Lisa Anderson Fletcher (2021–2023)
9. Wendy Leatherwoood (2023–Present)

== Notable people ==
=== Alumni ===
- Carl Pickens (1988), former NFL wide receiver and 2x Pro Bowl selection
- John J. Snow, Jr. (1963), member of the North Carolina Senate
- Hedy West (1955), folksinger and songwriter

=== Faculty ===
- Dave Bristol, former assistant football coach at Murphy, went on to manage the Cincinnati Reds, Milwaukee Brewers, Atlanta Braves, and San Francisco Giants

== See also ==
- Murphy Elementary School
- Murphy Middle School
- List of high schools in North Carolina
