= Cobb House =

Cobb House or Cobbs House may refer to:

- Whitman-Cobb House, New Market, Alabama
- Cobb House (Grove Hill, Alabama)
- Alston-Cobb House, Grove Hill, Alabama
- Pattie Cobb Hall, Searcy, Arkansas
- Ollinger-Cobb House, Milton, Florida
- Cobb-Treanor House, Athens, Georgia, listed on the National Register of Historic Places (NRHP)
- T. R. R. Cobb House, Athens, Georgia
- Steele-Cobb House, Decatur, Georgia, listed on the NRHP
- Whitney Cobb House, Richmond, Kentucky, listed on the NRHP in Kentucky
- Auld-McCobb House, Boothbay Harbor, Maine
- George Cobb House, Worcester, Massachusetts
- Frank J. Cobbs House, Cadillac, Michigan
- Hezekiah W. and Sarah E. Fishell Cobb House, Perry, Michigan, listed on the NRHP
- Cyrus B. Cobb House, White Bear Lake, Minnesota
- Cobb House (Vicksburg, Mississippi), a Mississippi Landmark
- Caldwell-Cobb-Love House, Lincolnton, North Carolina
- John Franklin Cobb House, Bell View, North Carolina
- Frank J. and Maude Louise Cobbs Estate, Portland, Oregon listed on the NRHP
- Samuel Cobb House, Portland, Oregon
- Whitney Cobb House, Richmond, Kentucky, listed on the NRHP
- George N. Cobb House, Oconomowoc, Wisconsin, listed on the NRHP

== See also ==
- Cobb Building (disambiguation)
