= National Register of Historic Places listings in Cherokee County, North Carolina =

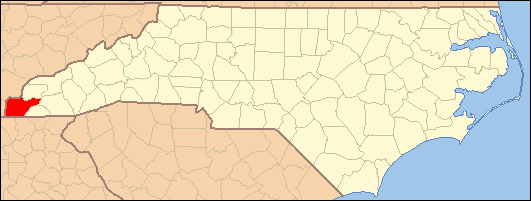

This list includes properties and districts listed on the National Register of Historic Places in Cherokee County, North Carolina. Click the "Map of all coordinates" link to the right to view an online map of all properties and districts with latitude and longitude coordinates in the table below.

== Current listings ==
This National Park Service list is complete through NPS recent listings posted May 1, 2026.

	Name on the Register	Image	Date listed	Location	City or town	Description
1	Apalachia Hydroelectric Project	Apalachia Hydroelectric Project	October 26, 2017 (#100001459)	Apalachia Dam Rd. 35°10′04″N 84°17′44″W	Murphy	
2	John C. Campbell Folk School Historic District	John C. Campbell Folk School Historic District	August 22, 1983 (#83001839)	Off U.S. Route 64; 35°02′10″N 83°57′54″W	Brasstown	
3	Cherokee County Courthouse	Cherokee County Courthouse	May 10, 1979 (#79001692)	75 Peachtree Street; 35°05′12″N 84°01′59″W	Murphy	
4	John Franklin Cobb House	John Franklin Cobb House	October 11, 1984 (#84000074)	U.S. Routes 19/129; 35°00′07″N 84°05′04″W	Bell View	
5	Hiwassee Hydroelectric Project	Hiwassee Hydroelectric Project	August 11, 2017 (#100001460)	600 Powerhouse Rd. 35°09′04″N 84°10′40″W	Murphy	
6	Robert Lafayette Cooper House	Robert Lafayette Cooper House	September 5, 1990 (#90001372)	70 Campbell St. 35°05′14″N 84°01′50″W	Murphy	
7	Franklin Pierce Cover House	Franklin Pierce Cover House	November 12, 1982 (#82001293)	177 Wilson Street; 35°12′07″N 83°49′37″W	Andrews	
8	First Baptist Church	First Baptist Church	September 14, 2002 (#02000962)	101 Chestnut St. 35°12′00″N 83°49′31″W	Andrews	
9	Harshaw Chapel and Cemetery	Harshaw Chapel and Cemetery	April 5, 1984 (#84001979)	150 Church Street; 35°05′07″N 84°02′01″W	Murphy	
10	Walker's Inn	Walker's Inn	August 19, 1975 (#75001247)	South of Andrews on NC 1505 off NC 19 and 1393; 35°11′35″N 83°48′16″W	Andrews	

== Former listing ==
	Name on the Register	Image	Date listed	Date removed	Location	City or town	Description
1	Andrews Mound		1973 (#73002236)	1975	Address Restricted	Andrews	Burial mounds. Bulldozed in 1975 to build a shopping center.

== See also ==
- National Register of Historic Places listings in North Carolina
- List of National Historic Landmarks in North Carolina
