= Erlanger Western Carolina Hospital =

Coordinates: 35.0728°N 83.9667°W

- Erlanger Health System
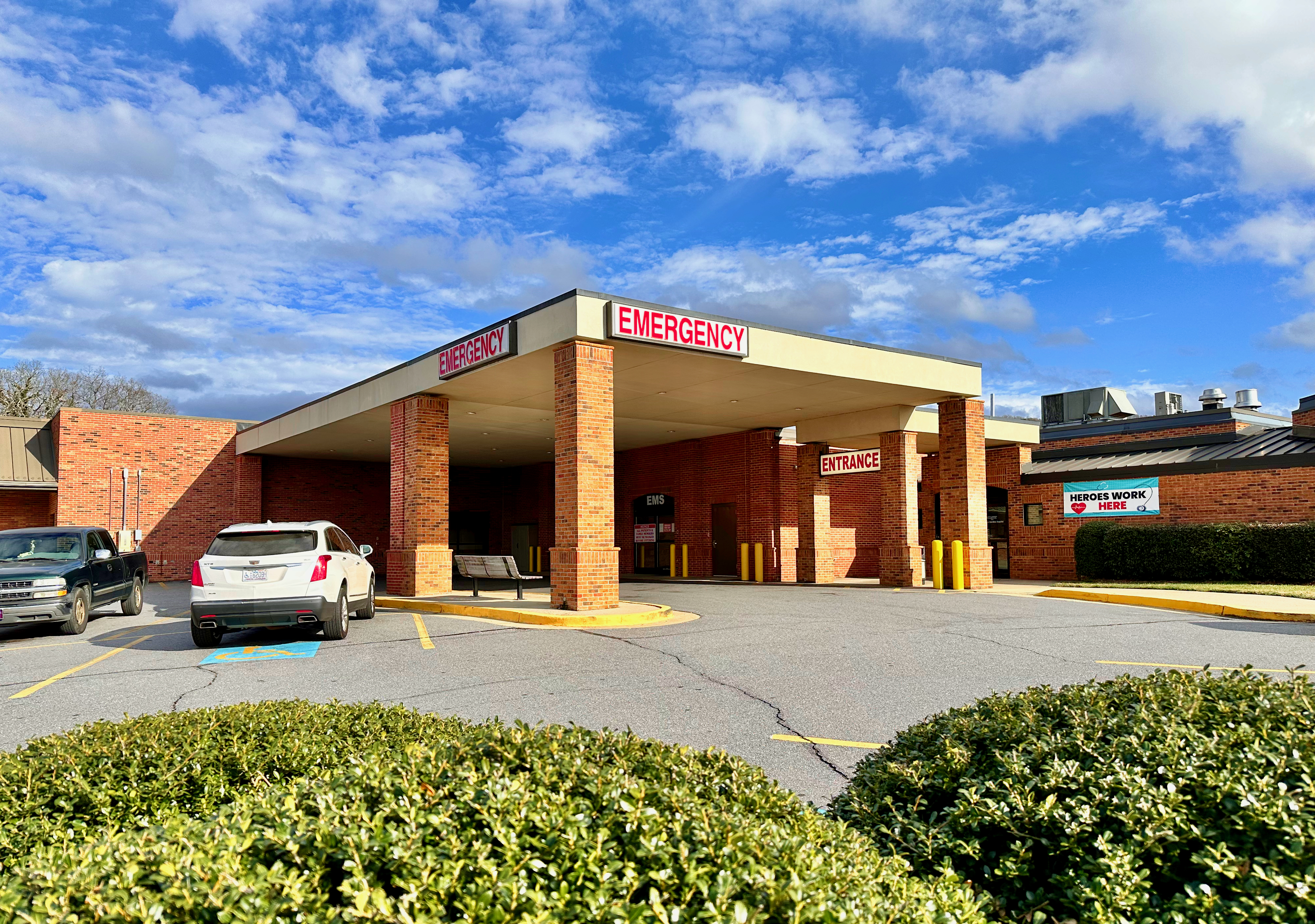

Geography
- Location: Murphy, Cherokee County, North Carolina, United States

Organization
- Type: General

Services
- Emergency department: Yes
- Beds: 57

Helipads
- Helipad: Yes

History
- Constructed: May 1977
- Founded: January 1979

Links
- Website: https://www.erlanger.org/locations/erlanger-hospitals/erlanger-western-carolina-hospital
- Lists: Hospitals in North Carolina

Erlanger Western Carolina Hospital (EWCH) is a hospital located in Murphy, North Carolina certified by the United States Department of Health and Human Services. It is the only hospital in the state west of Bryson City and Franklin. The hospital is licensed for 191 beds. Of the 191 beds, 120 are nursing home beds, 57 are general beds, and 14 are beds for patients with Alzheimer's disease.

It is affiliated with Erlanger Health System, based in Chattanooga, TN. After acquiring the hospital in 2018, Erlanger renamed the facility from its original name "Murphy Medical Center" to "Erlanger Western Carolina Hospital." Its hospitalist medical director is Tariku Mekonnen Assen, as of 2026.

== Quality ratings ==
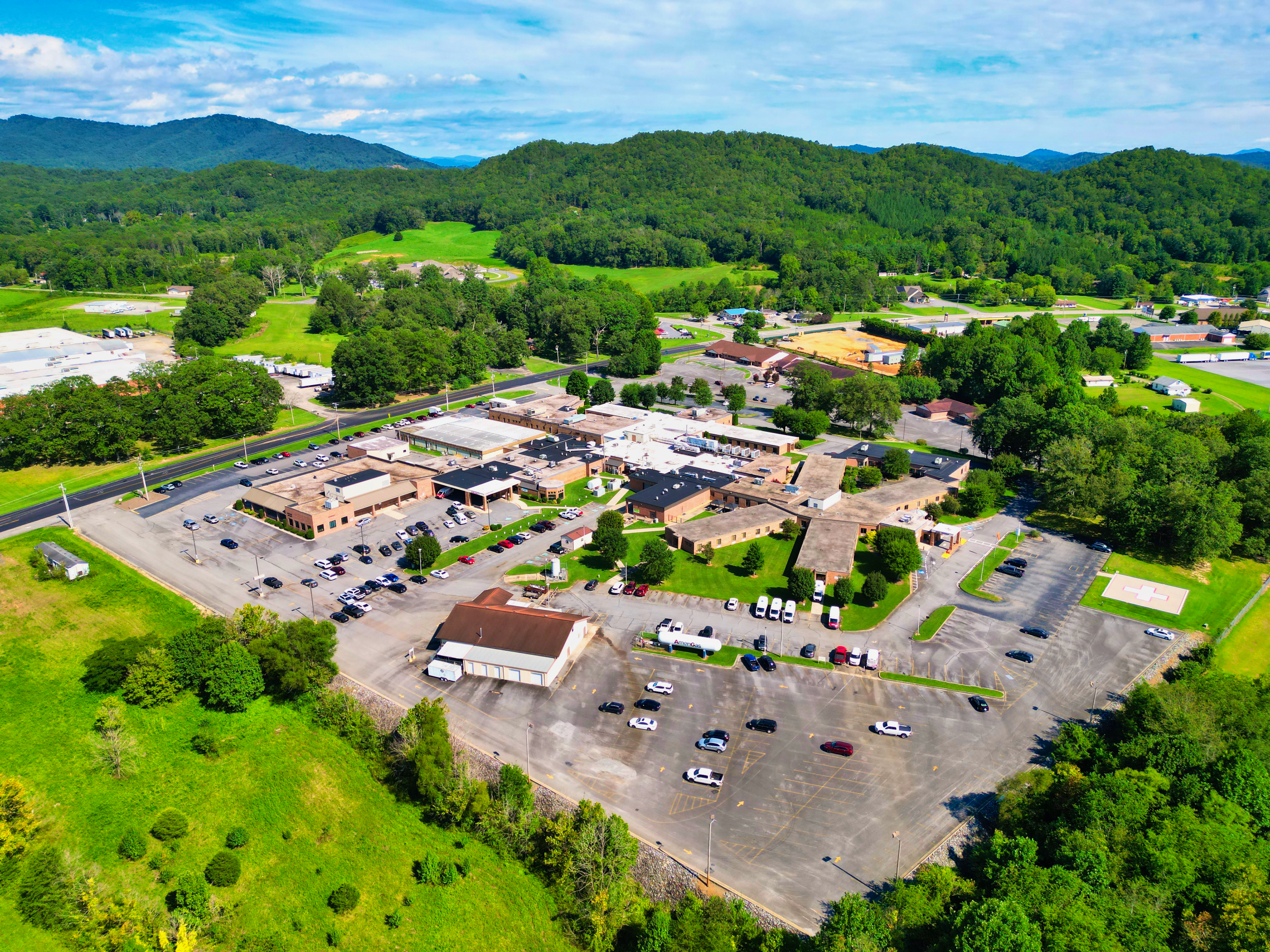
Erlanger Western Carolina Hospital near Murphy, N.C.

Much hospital quality information exists in the HealthGrades website concerning this hospital. HealthGrades shows twelve quality indicators; these are rated as one star, three stars and five stars. This hospital scored as follows:

- one star - one rating
- three stars - nine ratings
- five stars - one rating.

The hospital was rated on nine patient-safety indicators. Murphy Medical Center received the following ratings:

- worse than average - three ratings
- average - five ratings
- better than average - one rating.

The Nursing Home Rating website has quality information about the nursing home part of EWCH. Its overall rating was four of five possible stars, with five stars being the best possible rating. This information was generated in 2013. In 2025 and 2026, Erlanger Western Carolina Hospital was voted as the Best Medical Facility in Cherokee County by the Cherokee Scout Readers' Choice Awards. In 2026, Becker's Hospital Review listed Erlanger Western Carolina as one of only 20 hospitals in North Carolina that patients highly recommend.

== History ==
Cherokee County’s first medical institution was Petrie Hospital, founded in November 1933 by Dr. R.W. Petrie, an eye, ear, nose, and throat specialist. The hospital was a two-story white brick building atop a hill on Peachtree Street in downtown Murphy. It started with four registered nurses and a capacity of 21 patients. The Sisters of Providence of Holyoke came to Murphy in 1956 to manage Petrie Hospital and renamed it Providence Hospital. The 22-bed Murphy General Hospital was built by Dr. F. V. Taylor in 1941 and closed in July 1969 due to insufficient staff and property. In 1956, a 30-bed non-profit regional hospital named District Memorial Hospital was constructed in nearby Andrews. Citing uncollected payments, District Memorial declared bankruptcy in 2000. Murphy Medical acquired District Memorial's assets in 2002 before District Memorial closed in June 2003, and was demolished in late 2008.

In January 1974 the Murphy Town Council approved spending $4,000 on a study to see whether constructing a new hospital was feasible. Mountain Health Services of Blairsville, Georgia, recommended the construction of a new $5.5 million medical center. Ground breaking for the new hospital was on May 12, 1977 and Murphy Medical Center was founded in January 1979. Providence Hospital closed soon after the ground-breaking of MMC. Providence donated $120,000 worth of equipment to the hospital. The medical center opened with three general practitioners, one surgeon, one obstetrician-gynecologist, and a two-bed intensive care unit. In January 1982, Charlotte-based SunHealth took over management of the hospital. After the FAA halted helicopter landings near the hospital due to unsafe conditions, the medical center built and opened a dedicated heliport in September 1985. In October 1985, Atlanta-based Health Southeast took over management of the hospital from SunHealth and Jerry Hummel was appointed as administrator.

In the 1990s, MMC went from being a county-supported not-for-profit hospital to becoming a private not-for-profit medical facility, which allowed it to fundraise to secure financing. From 1990 through 2017 Murphy Medical Center held an annual 5K run at the hospital campus to raise money. The race was called “Two Hours From Anywhere.” The hospital opened a cardiac rehabilitation unit and a memory care unit. The medical center opened Mountain Regional Cancer Center around 2000. The hospital opened an urgent care center in a Murphy shopping center in 1998. The urgent care center moved to its current location in 2009 and treats approximately 12,000 walk-in patients per year. Erlanger also operates express care centers in Andrews and Hayesville. As of 2013, the emergency department at the Peachtree campus treated approximately 15,000 patients per year. Murphy Medical began losing money as uncompensated care grew to $13 million in 2013. In 2015, involuntarily committed behavioral health patients were flooding the emergency department, so the hospital closed its Alzheimer's Unit to create a holding area.

Erlanger Health System acquired Murphy Medical Center in January 2018 and changed its name in January 2019. The hospital closed its labor and delivery unit in December 2019. As of 2018, the hospital had approximately 450 employees. In 2023, an Erlanger Life Force helicopter ambulance transporting a patient to Asheville's Mission Hospital crashed near Franklin 15 minutes after leaving Erlanger Western Carolina Hospital. All four aboard survived. The helicopter was based at the Western Carolina Regional Airport in Andrews. That same year, Erlanger Western Carolina Hospital served as incident command post during the 5,000-acre Collett Ridge Fire. Since 2023, Erlanger has provided athletic trainers to Andrews and Murphy high schools. In late 2024, the hospital opened a nature garden for staff and patients in a trapped space between buildings.

On June 30, 2025, a fatal shooting occurred at a nearby orthopedics office affiliated with the hospital. A federal inmate shot a Cherokee County Sheriff's Office (CCSO) detention officer with his own gun and injured another. The officer that was shot was taken into the main hospital where he was pronounced deceased. The inmate stole a vehicle, fled, and was arrested in Macon County, near Franklin. He was arrested on a first-degree murder charge and was taken to the Buncombe County Detention Center. The inmate had a virtual court appearance in Swain County. The hospital and the nearby Tri-County Community College were on lockdown. The inmate had previously been arrested on robbery charges and had previously escaped from CCSO's custody in 2024.

In December 2025, Erlanger Western Carolina announced plans to add 20,000 square feet of patient care areas, consolidating radiology, laboratory services, urgent care, primary care, urology, orthopedic care, and general surgery into a single location on the main hospital campus. $3 million in federal funding was allocated for the project after being requested by Chuck Edwards in the bill reopening the government following the 2025 government shutdown. In mid-2026, Erlanger Western Carolina announced the closure of its retail pharmacy due to regulatory and financial pressures.

== Chief executives ==
1. Jerry Hummel (1985–)
2. J. Michael Stevenson (1989–2018)
3. Mark Kimball (2018–2020)
4. Stephanie Boynton (2020–present)
