= Walker's Inn =

Historic house in North Carolina, United States

- U.S. National Register of Historic Places
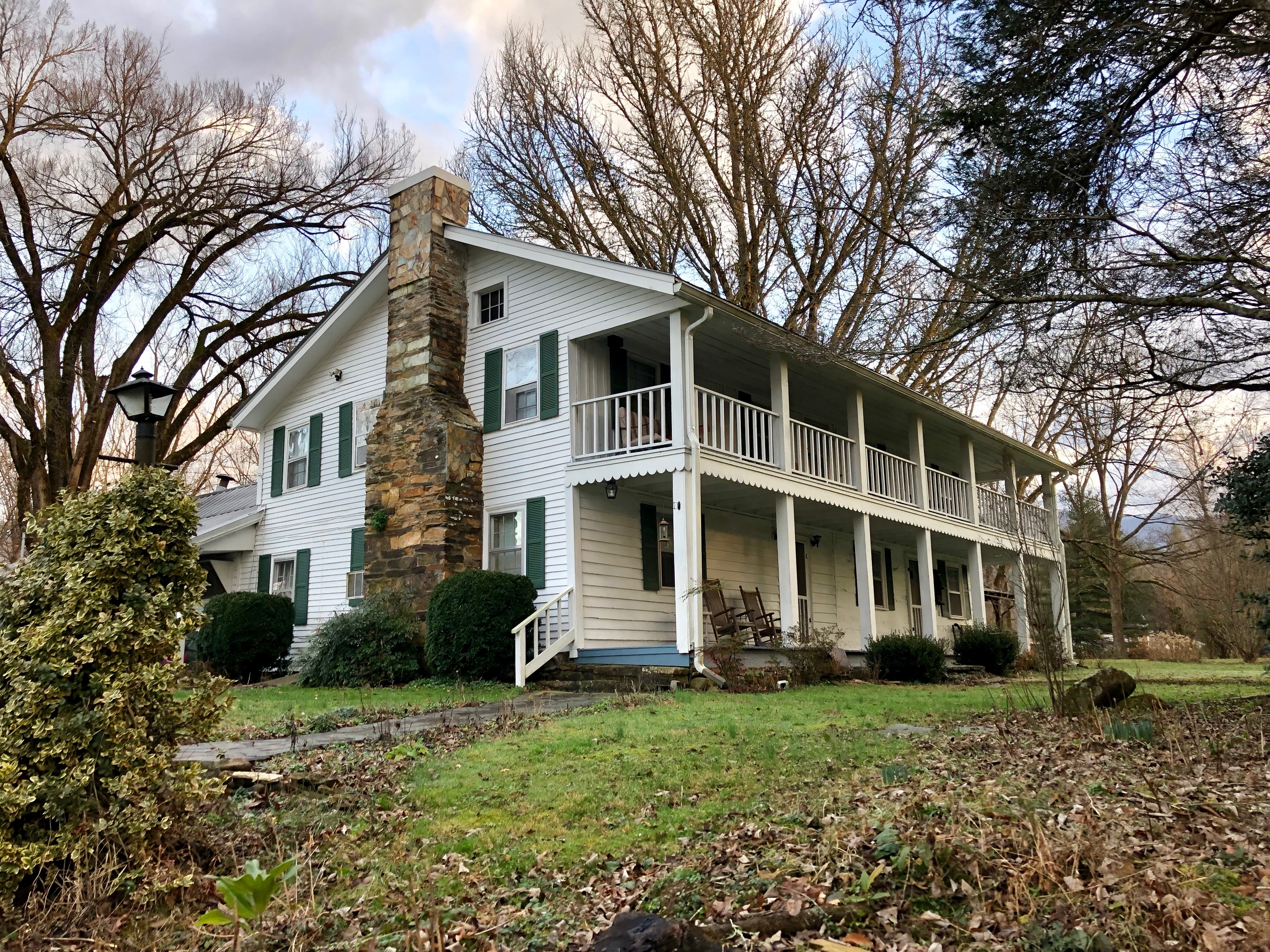
- Walker's Inn, January 2019

- Location within North Carolina Location within the United States
- Location: South of Andrews on NC 1505 off NC 19 and 1393, near Andrews, North Carolina
- Coordinates: 35°11′35″N 83°48′16″W
- Area: 1 acre (0.40 ha)
- Built: 1844
- NRHP reference No.: 75001247
- Added to NRHP: August 19, 1975

Walker's Inn is a historic building in rural Cherokee County, North Carolina. The two-story five-bay frame house is located at the northeast corner of the junction of SR 1505 and SR 1393 near Andrews.

== History ==
The house was apparently built in stages, beginning in 1840, after Squire William Walker and his wife Margaret Scott Walker acquired the land on which it stands. It was constructed by Thomas Tatham and his son Thomas C. Tatham. The three rightmost bays of the house are a log structure, while the two on the left are a frame structure. The logs are partially exposed on the front, while most of the house is sheathed in board-and-batten siding. Windows are irregularly placed on the main facade.

Long known as an inn, it served as a stagecoach stop along what was in the 19th century the major route between Franklin and Murphy. Frederick Law Olmsted stayed at the inn during his travels in the area in the late 19th century. Cherokee Native American chief Junaluska also stayed at the property multiple times. The site at one time included a general store and the first post office to serve the Andrews area, both operated by the Walkers.

The inn is one of the oldest surviving structures in the county, and was listed on the National Register of Historic Places in 1975. In the early 1980s the property was purchased and restored by Margaret Walker Freel. It closed in the early 2020s and was reopened by Jessica and Phil Rickett in fall 2024 as a bed and breakfast. As of 2025, the property also hosts events such as weddings, concerts, and graduations.

== See also ==
- National Register of Historic Places listings in Cherokee County, North Carolina
