= District Memorial Hospital =

Former hospital in North Carolina, United States

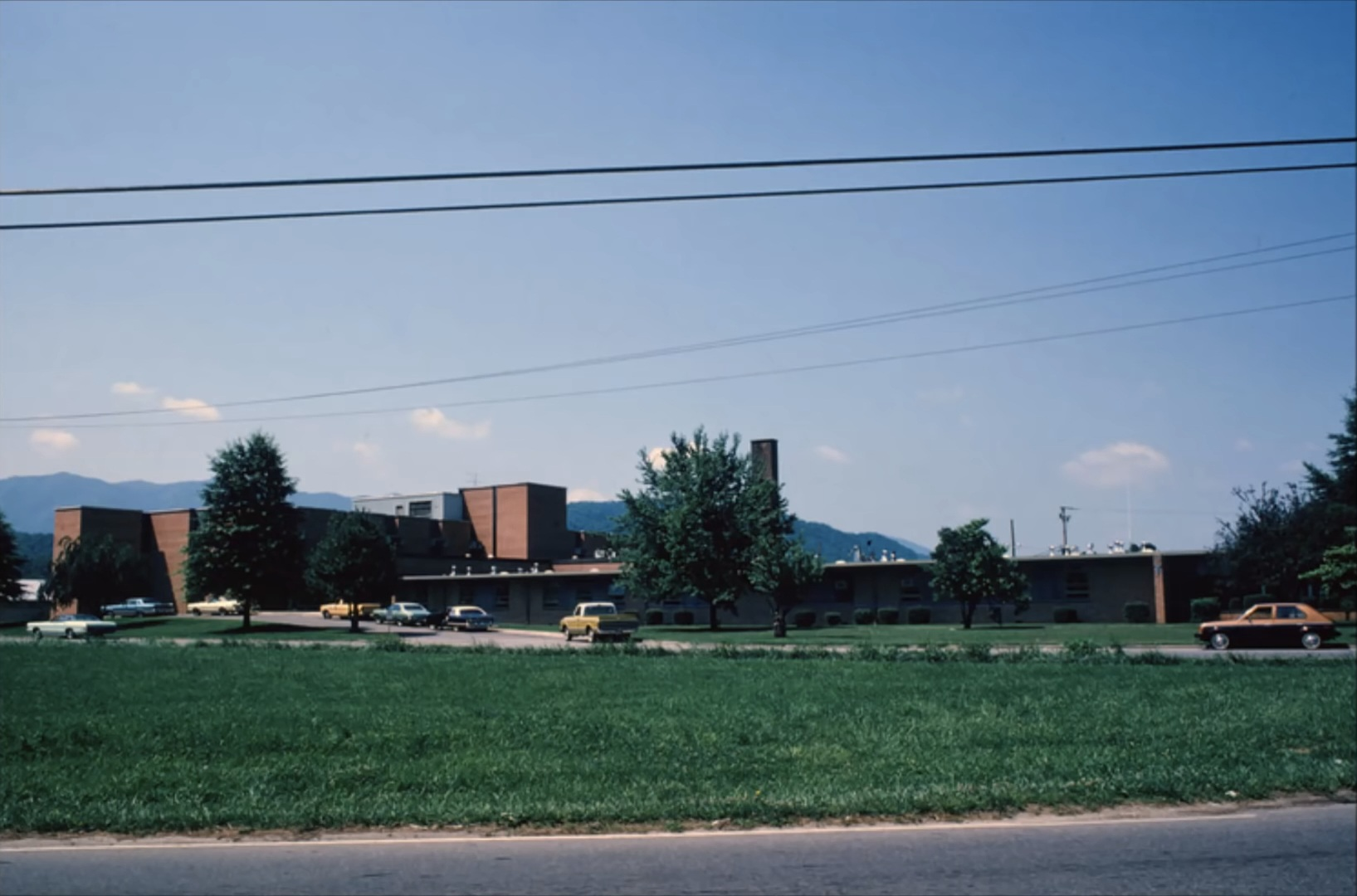
- District Memorial Hospital c.1979.

Geography
- Location: Andrews, Cherokee County, North Carolina, United States

Organization
- Type: General

Services
- Emergency department: Yes
- Beds: 64

History
- Constructed: 1955
- Founded: 1956
- Closed: 2003
- Demolished: 2008

Links
- Lists: Hospitals in North Carolina

District Memorial Hospital of Southwestern North Carolina, Inc. (also known simply as District Memorial Hospital, District Hospital, or the Andrews Hospital) was a hospital located in Andrews, North Carolina. The hospital opened in 1956 and closed in 2003. It operated a 64-bed facility and an internal medicine facility.

== History ==
District Memorial Hospital (DMH), officially the District Memorial Hospital of Southwestern North Carolina Incorporated, was incorporated in 1954, with Percy B. Ferebee as the first chairman. Ferebee also served as mayor of the town of Andrews. DMH was opened in 1956 as a 30-bed hospital. The "District" part of the name comes from the hospital district of the Valleytown Township, Clay County, and Graham County. The "Memorial" part of the name comes from the memorial plaque in the hospital that honored those serving in World War I, World War II, and the Korean War.

The first mention of building a new hospital in Andrews was the headline of the May 20, 1954, edition of the Cherokee Scout. Federal funds covered 44% of the costs and state funds covered 36.4%. At the time the article was published, the hospital still needed to cover 21.4% of the costs, plus the purchase of a six-acre site. The original total costs of the hospital were $345,000 but those costs ended up around $375,000. District residents raised more than $100,000 for the hospital's construction. The Hill–Burton Act also helped cover costs. The decision to have the site in Andrews was made due to its central location in the three-section district, 6-inch water line, and an adequate sewage system. A board of trustees were made up of the citizens of the three sections.

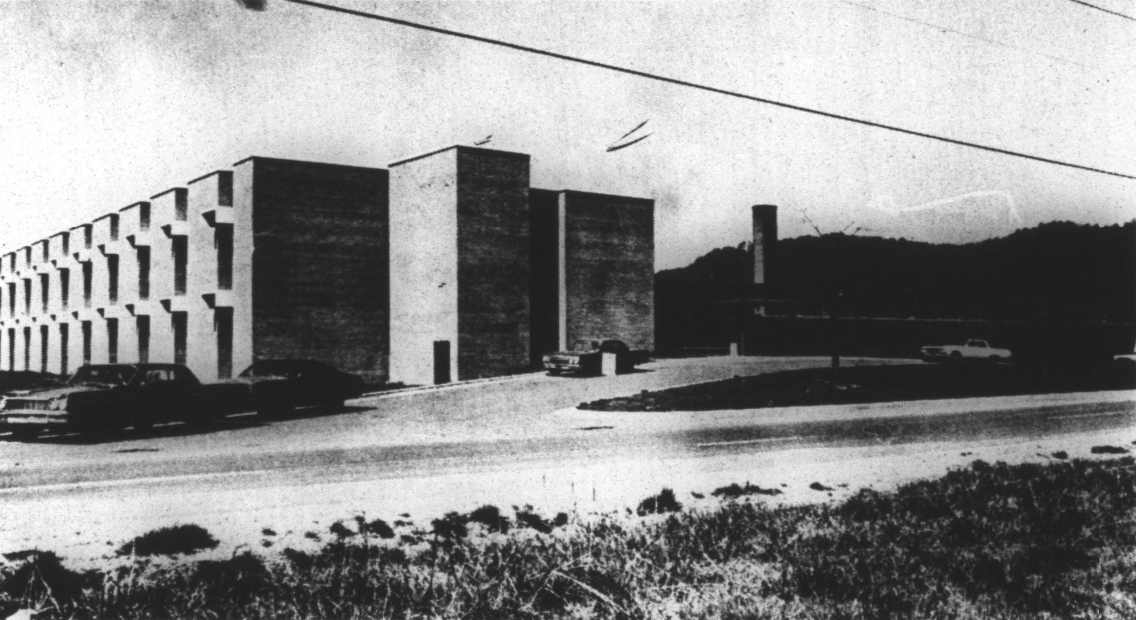
District Memorial Hospital c.1971

An expansion between 1956 and 1970 increased the number of beds from 30 to 50. In 1970, another expansion was made to the hospital, increasing the number of beds from 50 to 64, and adding a two-story wing. In February 1979, a hospital management group assumed management of the hospital. A new x-ray became operational that July.

In 1992, Andrews Internal Medicine was founded. Its dedicated facility was built around 1995. It was affiliated with DMH until the hospital closure. It was affiliated with Murphy Medical Center (MMC) afterward. Andrews Internal Medicine operated in its facility until 2006, when a new facility was built across from Andrews Middle School at 2751 US 19 Business. In 2018, around the time of Erlanger Health System's purchase of Murphy Medical Center, Andrews Internal Medicine became Erlanger Primary Care.

DMH filed for Chapter 11 bankruptcy on June 6, 2000. On November 30, 2001, MMC acquired the assets of DMH. On March 24, 2003, DMH closed its doors In December 2008, MMC contracted NEO Corporation to clear all asbestos and demolish the DMH building. An effort to keep the trees surrounding the building was made and they were not affected in the demolition. Today, the property is an empty field. Remnants of the hospital include an active EMS station, part of the hospital's parking lot, a road named Memorial Drive, and a separate medical building once used by DMH.

== Chief executives ==
1. Dan White (–2000)
2. Al Swain (2000–)
3. Dennis Ramsey (–2003)
