= First Baptist Church (Andrews, North Carolina) =

Historic church in North Carolina, United States

- U.S. National Register of Historic Places
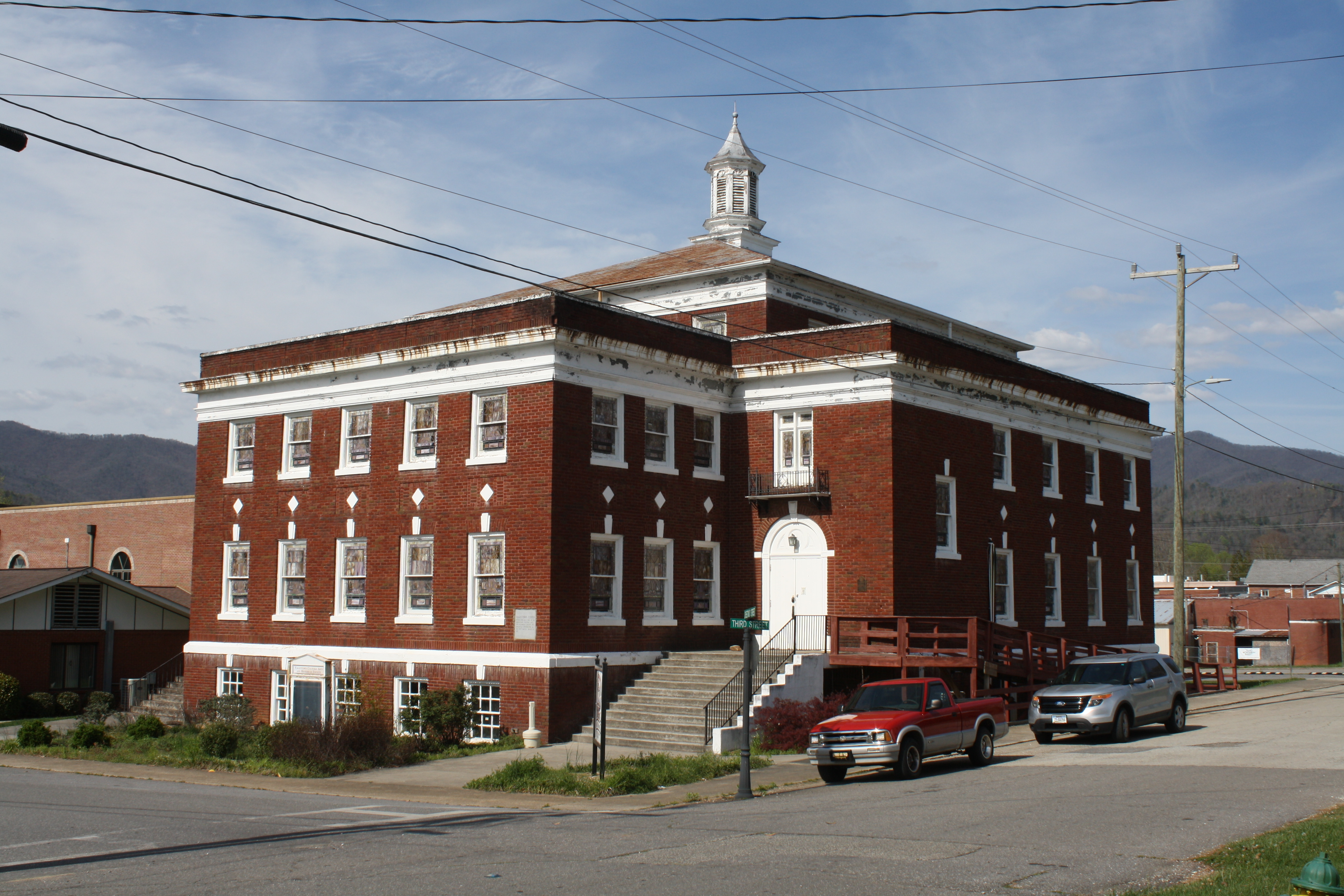
- Valleytown Cultural Arts Center, 2026

- Location within North Carolina Location within the United States
- Location: 101 Chestnut St., Andrews, North Carolina
- Coordinates: 35°11′59″N 83°49′31″W
- Area: less than one acre
- Built: 1923
- Architectural style: Classical Revival
- NRHP reference No.: 02000962
- Added to NRHP: September 14, 2002

The former First Baptist Church, now the Valleytown Cultural Arts Center is a historic Baptist church building at 101 Chestnut Street in Andrews, Cherokee County, North Carolina. The Classical Revival brick structure was built in 1923 for a congregation founded in 1902; it was their second building on the site. The building was used by the congregation until c. 1987, when it was sold to a local nonprofit corporation for use as an arts center.

The building was listed on the National Register of Historic Places in 2002.

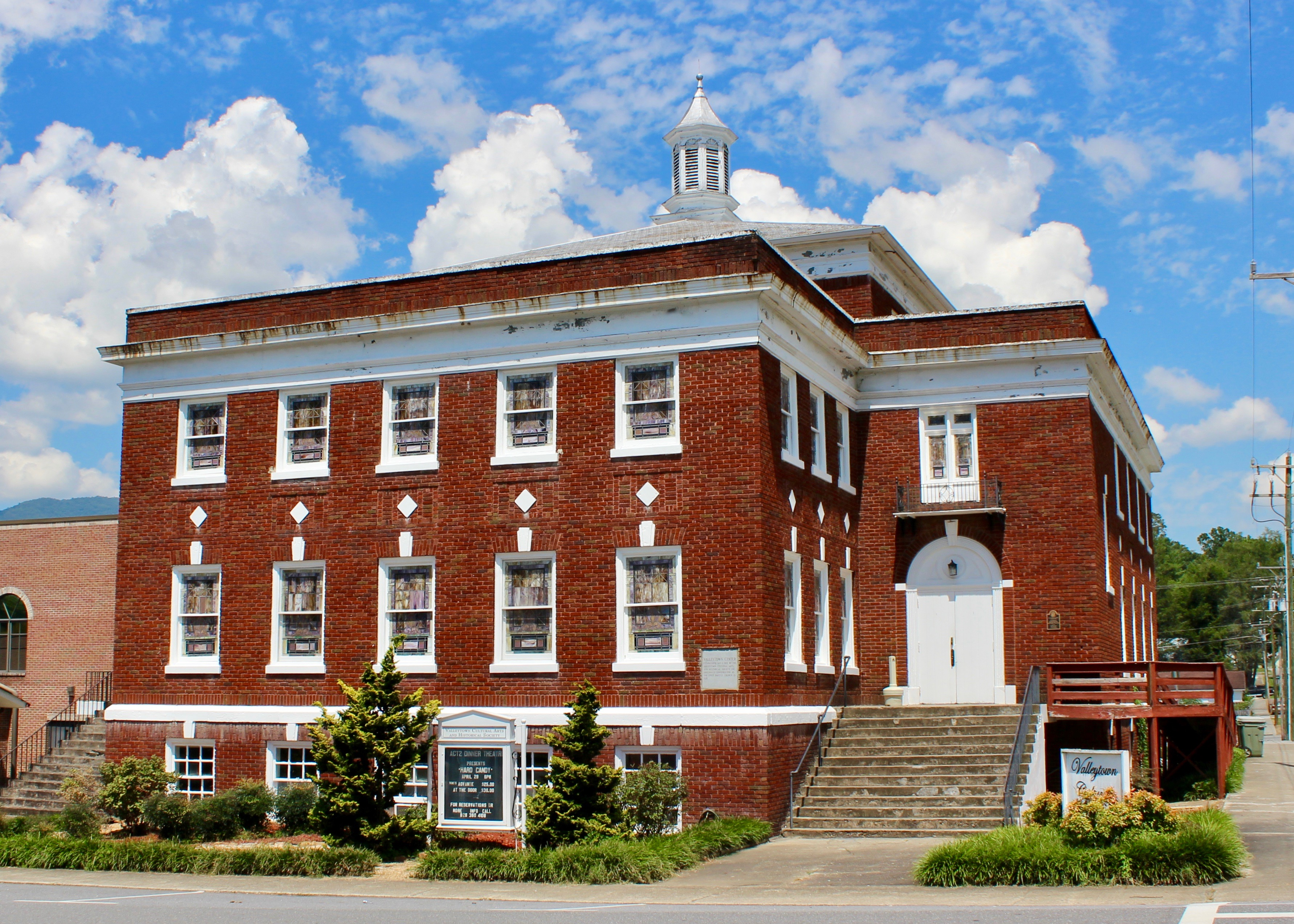
Valleytown Cultural Arts Center, 2017

== See also ==
- National Register of Historic Places listings in Cherokee County, North Carolina
