= Franklin Pierce Cover House =

Historic house in North Carolina, United States

- U.S. National Register of Historic Places
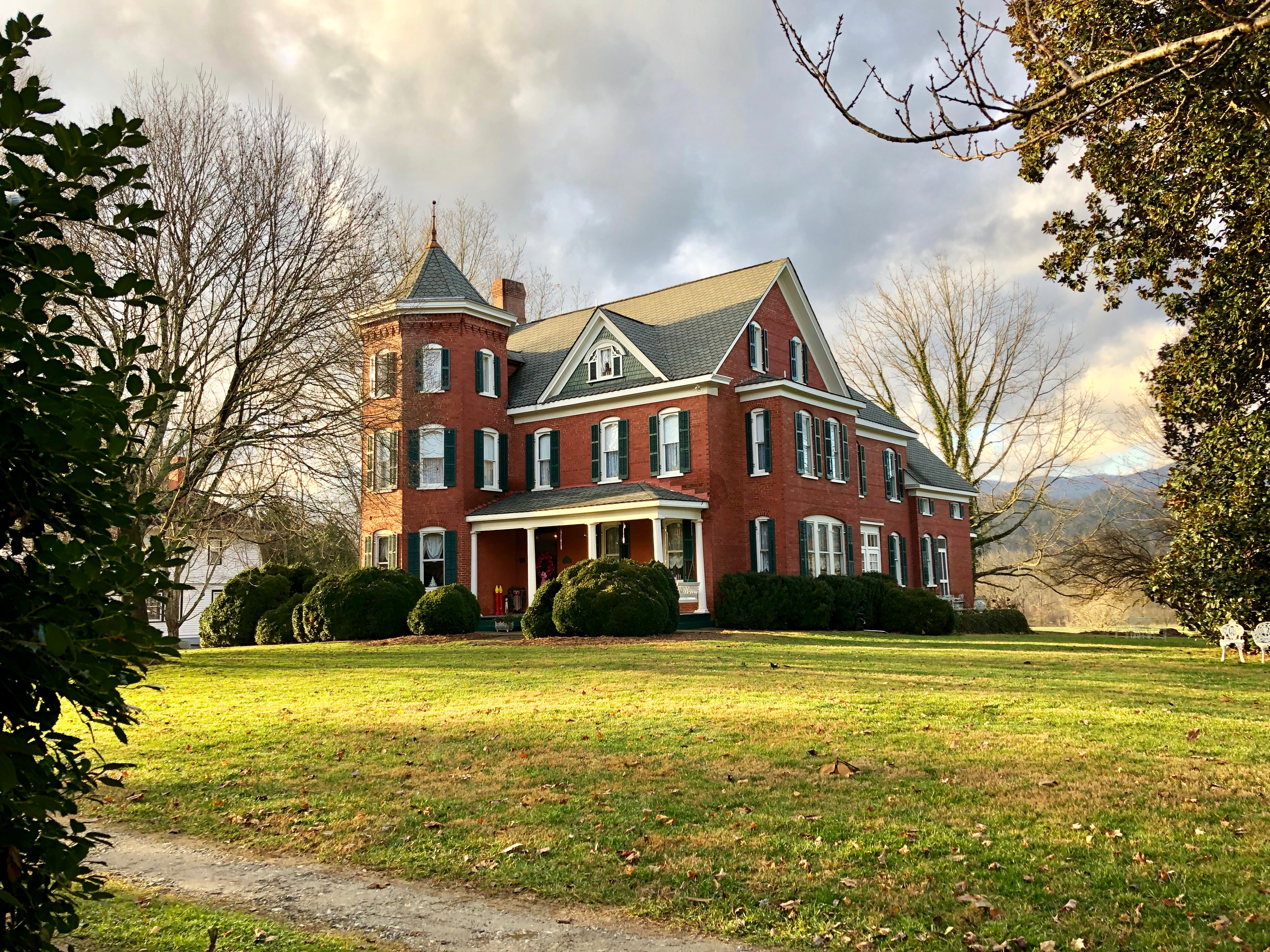
- Franklin Pierce Cover House, January 2019

- Location within North Carolina Location within the United States
- Location: 330 Cover Avenue, Andrews, North Carolina
- Coordinates: 35°12′6″N 83°49′38″W
- Area: 3 acres (1.2 ha)
- Built: 1900
- Architectural style: Queen Anne
- NRHP reference No.: 82001293
- Added to NRHP: November 12, 1982

The Franklin Pierce Cover House is a historic house at 330 Cover Avenue in Andrews, North Carolina. The 2 1/2-story brick Queen Anne Victorian was built in 1900, and is a remnant of Andrews' industrial heritage. The house was built by Franklin Pierce Cover, owner of a local tannery. It exhibits the complex massing typical of Queen Anne houses, with multiple gables, projections, and a massive three-story octagonal tower. Documentary photographs suggest the house once had a Queen Anne porch with brackets and an ornamental frieze, but this was replaced by a more Colonial Revival scheme with heavier Tuscan columns.

The house was listed on the National Register of Historic Places in 1982.

== See also ==
- National Register of Historic Places listings in Cherokee County, North Carolina
