= Robert Lafayette Cooper House =

Historic house in North Carolina, United States

- U.S. National Register of Historic Places
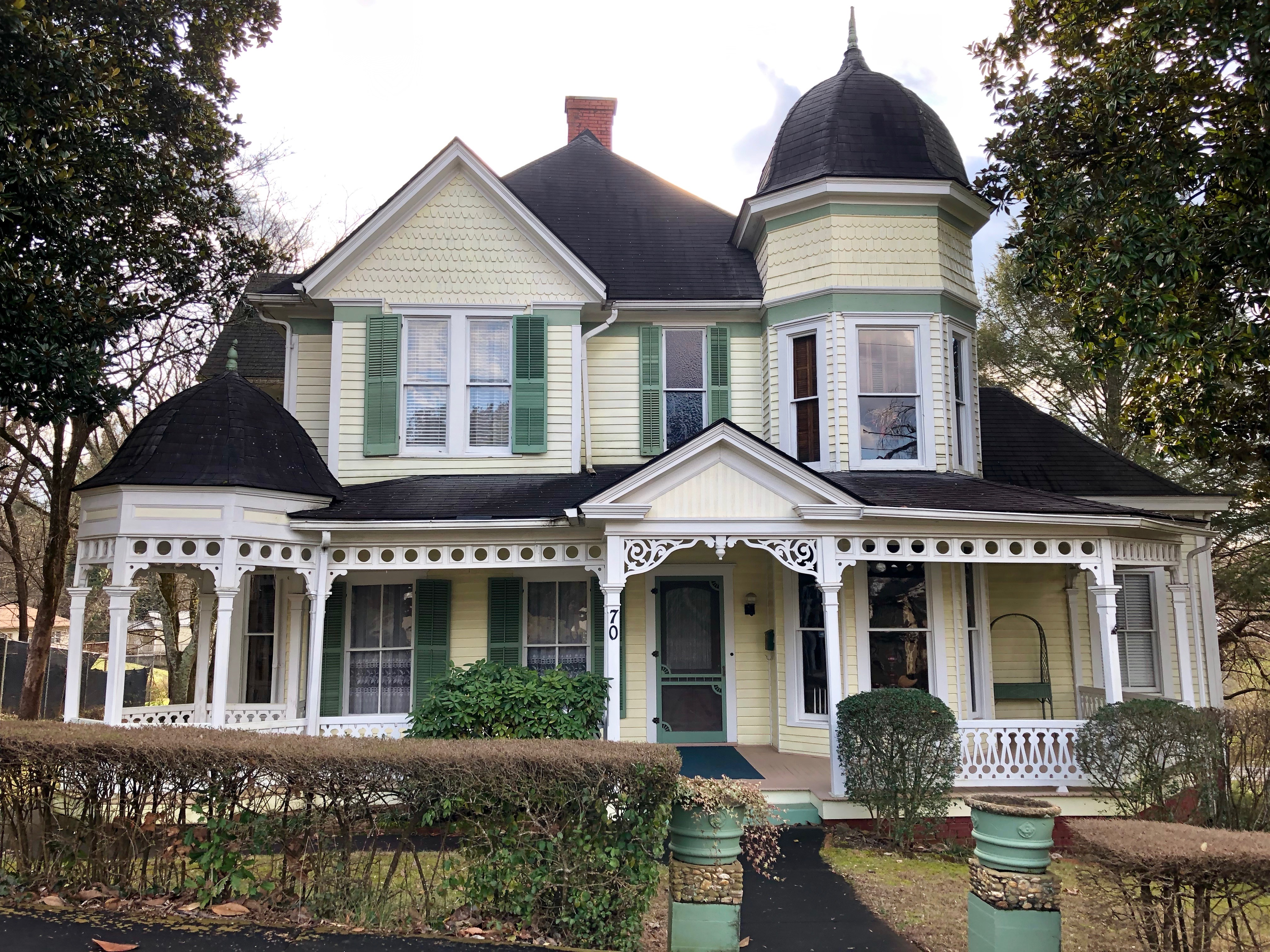
- Robert Lafayette Cooper House, January 2019

- Location within North Carolina Location within the United States
- Location: 109 Campbell St., Murphy, North Carolina
- Coordinates: 35°5′13″N 84°1′50″W
- Area: 0.5 acres (0.20 ha)
- Built: 1889
- Architectural style: Queen Anne
- NRHP reference No.: 90001372
- Added to NRHP: September 5, 1990

The Robert Lafayette Cooper House is a historic house at 109 Campbell Street in Murphy, North Carolina. The two story wood-frame house was built 1889–91, and is one of the finest Queen Anne Victorian houses in Cherokee County. The house is roughly rectangular in mass, with a number of gable sections projecting from its hipped roof. It has two octagonal cupolas, and an elaborately decorated porch which includes an octagonal corner section. The house was built by Robert Lafayette Cooper, a successful local lawyer, as a wedding present for his wife.

The house was listed on the National Register of Historic Places in 1990.

== See also ==
- National Register of Historic Places listings in Cherokee County, North Carolina
