= Hezekiah W. and Sarah E. Fishell Cobb House =

- U.S. National Register of Historic Places
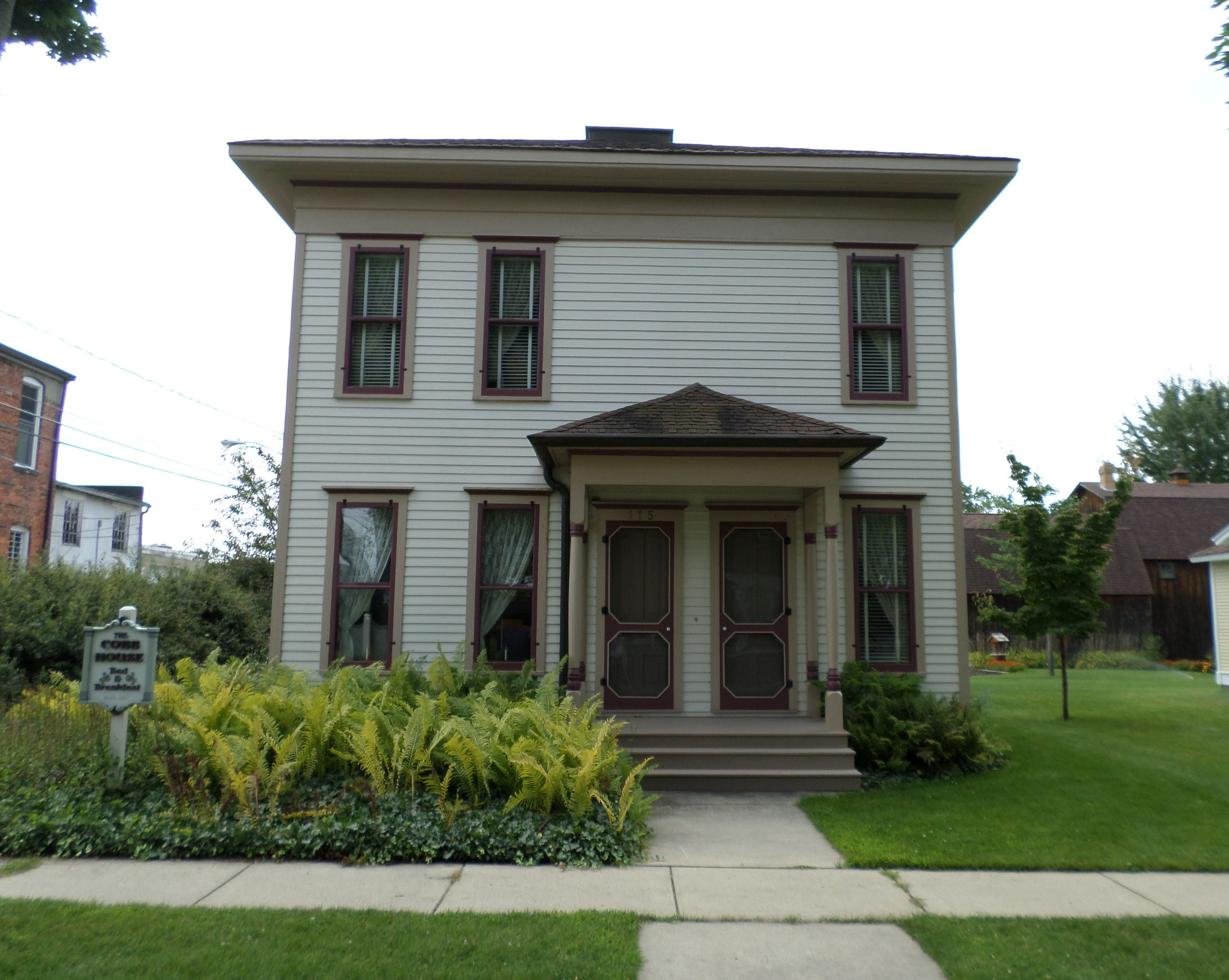
- Interactive map
- Location: 115 W. 2nd St., Perry, Michigan
- Coordinates: 42°49′29″N 84°13′12″W
- Area: less than one acre
- Built: 1880
- Architectural style: Late Victorian
- NRHP reference No.: 97000281
- Added to NRHP: April 11, 1997

The Hezekiah W. and Sarah E. Fishell Cobb House, also known as just the Cobb House, is a single-family home located at 115 West 2nd Street in Perry, Michigan. It was listed on the National Register of Historic Places in 1997.

== History ==
In 1874–77, the Chicago and Northeastern Railway (controlled by the Grand Trunk Western Railroad) constructed a line through this area. Local residents thought the railway would establish a station at the point where the line crossed the Mason and Owosso state road, but instead, the railway constructed a station three miles away in Morrice, Michigan. Undeterred, residents platted the village of Perry at the crossing point in 1877. The railway refused to establish a station at the new community, but residents petitioned the state Legislature, who decided in their favor. The population of the new community grew rapidly, and by 1880 had reached 300 people. Two of these were Hezekiah W. Cobb and his wife, Sarah Fishell Cobb, who came to Perry in early 1879. Cobb was a doctor, one of two in the community.

Hezekiah W. Cobb was born in Barre, New York, in 1832. He attended a seminary for two years, after which he taught school in Missouri for four years. During this time, he studied medicine, then attended the St. Louis Medical College. He married Sarah E. Fishell of Pembroke, New York in 1859. The couple moved to Pleasant Gap, Missouri, but in 1861, and the Civil War loomed, they fled back to New York after their house was burned. Cobb practiced medicine in New York State until 1876, then moved to Perry in 1879. When he arrived, there was no permanent lodging available, so Cobb lived and practiced out of the local hotel for over a year.

In 1880, the Cobbs built a new house to live in and to house their medical practice. In 1902, Sarah Cobb died, and in 1905, Hezekiah moved his practice out of the house to another building. He continued to practice medicine until at least 1911, and continued to live in his house until his death in 1920. By this time, the Cobbs' only child, Leon R. V. Cobb, and his wife Clara were living in the house, and they continued to live there until Leon's death in 1941 and Clara's in 1947. Their son Arthur B. Cobb and his wife Eva then moved in, and lived there until Arthur's death in 1967, and Eva's transition to a nursing home in the mid 1980s. The house was then vacant until 1989, when it was sold out of the family. In 1994, Thomas C. and Kellie L. Willson purchased the house and began the process of converting it into a bed and breakfast.

== Description ==
The Cobb House is a two-story hip-roof structure with a one-story gable-roof addition on the rear. The main section measures about twenty-six feet by twenty-eight feet, and the addition measures seventeen by fourteen feet. The house is clad with clapboard and is simply detailed, with plain cornerboards, a broad architrave and frieze bands, and broadly overhanging eaves. The windows are tall, narrow one-over-one square-head units in plain board frames with moulded caps. The facade is asymmetrical, with a pair of side-by-side entrances under a small hip-roof door porch with turned posts.
