= Frank J. Cobbs House =

Historic house in Michigan, United States

- U.S. National Register of Historic Places
- Michigan State Historic Site
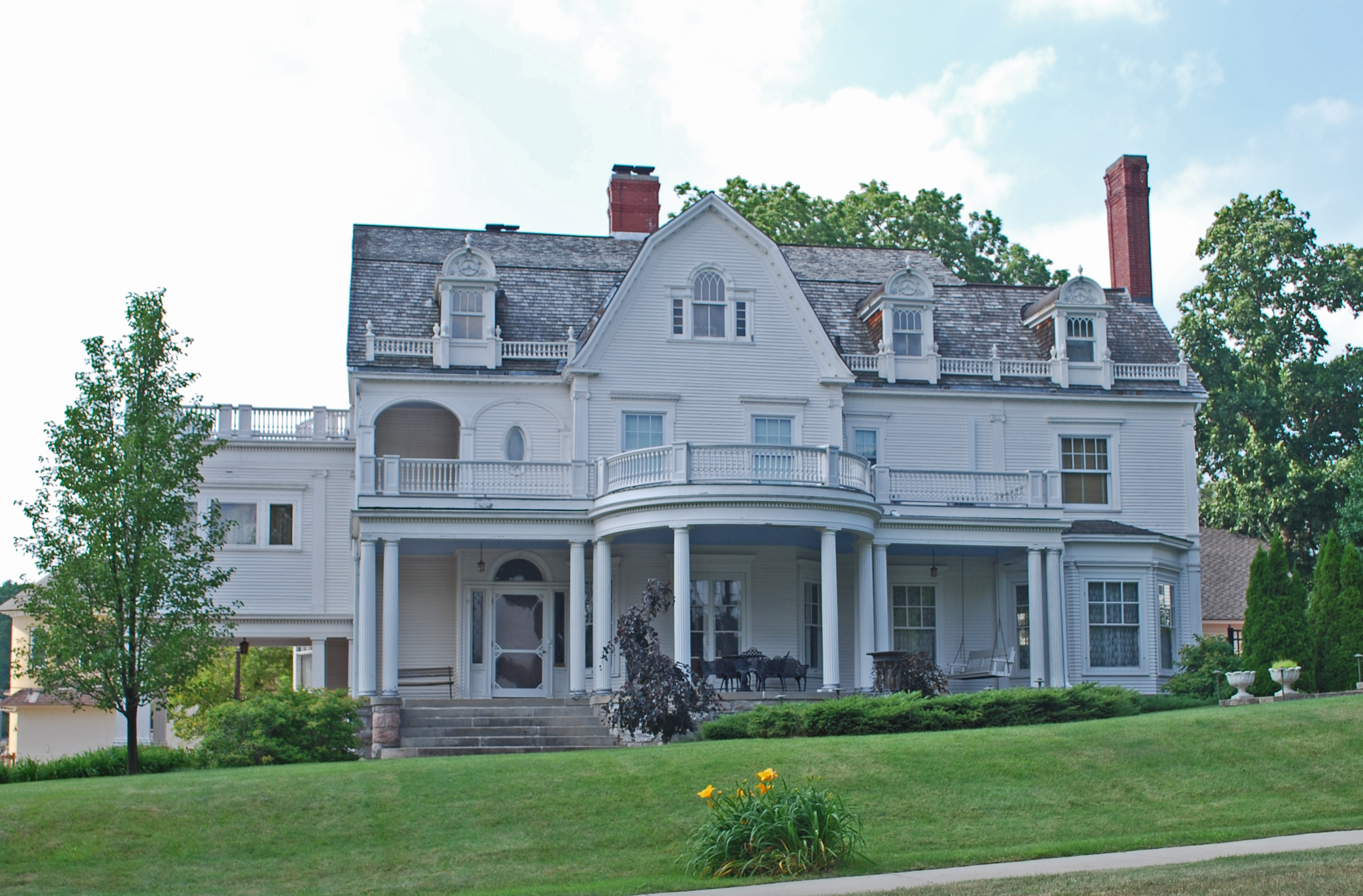

- Location within Michigan Location within the United States
- Interactive map
- Location: 407 E. Chapin St., Cadillac, Michigan
- Coordinates: 44°15′1″N 85°23′38″W
- Area: less than one acre
- Built: 1898
- Built by: James R. Fletcher
- Architect: possibly George D. Mason
- Architectural style: Colonial Revival
- NRHP reference No.: 88000376

Significant dates
- Added to NRHP: March 31, 1988
- Designated MSHS: September 25, 1985

The Frank J. Cobbs House is a private house located at 407 E. Chapin Street in Cadillac, Michigan. It was designated a Michigan State Historic Site in 1985 and listed on the National Register of Historic Places in 1988.

== History ==
Frank J. Cobbs was born in Jackson County, Indiana in 1872, and was adopted by Jonathan W. Cobbs. The Cobbs family soon moved to Cadillac where the elder Cobbs purchased a sawmill and, along with William W. Mitchell, founded the lumbering firm of Cobbs & Mitchell. Cobbs & Mitchell was among the largest lumbering firms in Michigan, supplying hardwood flooring and other products to consumers. At its high point, Cobbs & Mitchell used 100,000 feet of raw lumber daily. Cobbs & Mitchell's operations played a major role in the economic development of Cadillac in the late 19th and early 20th centuries.

Frank Cobbs attended prep school at the University of Notre Dame, later attended the Michigan Military Academy, then obtained a degree from Olivet College in 1894. He returned to Cadillac to work at Cobbs & Mitchell, and in 1895 organized the Cadillac State Bank. However, soon after, his father Jonathon Cobbs became ill. As the only son, Frank Cobbs took over his father's place at Cobbs & Mitchell; the elder Cobbs eventually died in 1898. Cobbs & Mitchell continued to grow under Frank Cobbs's management, with considerable investment in the Cadillac area and growing holdings in the Pacific Northwest.

Cobbs married Maude Louise Belcher in April 1898; the same year, he had this house built for himself and his family by local builder James R. Fletcher. It is thought that Detroit architect George D. Mason designed the house for Cobbs. In 1905, additions were made to the house, including adding a reading room over the porte cochere and extending the east wing. In 1912, the Cobbs moved to Oregon to supervise the Cobbs & Mitchell logging operations there, and in 1917 had an impressive Jacobethan mansion built in Portland. Maud Louise Cobbs died in Portland in 1940; Frank J. Cobbs died in 1951.

== Description ==
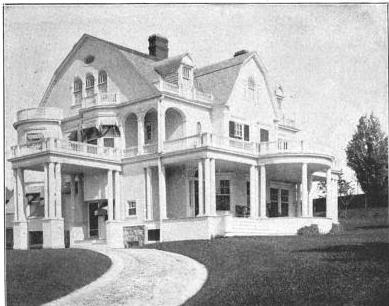
Frank J Cobbs House c1900

The Frank J. Cobbs House is a three-story Colonial Revival house with clapboard siding and a gambrel roof clad in red cedar shingles. The center of the front facade projects slightly forward and is surmounted by a gambrel-roof gable. One end of the house has a gable-roofed wing, while the other has what was once a porte cochere, which is now enclosed with an added second story room. The central portion of the facade projects slightly forward of the primary facade plane and is topped by a gambrel-roof gable. The exterior contains a variety of decorative elements, including a Palladian window, windows with molded caps, round-head dormers, and fluted columns and pilasters.

A former carriage house, matching the main house in style, is sited nearby. The carriage house now has an organ.
