= John Franklin Cobb House =

Historic house in North Carolina, United States

- U.S. National Register of Historic Places
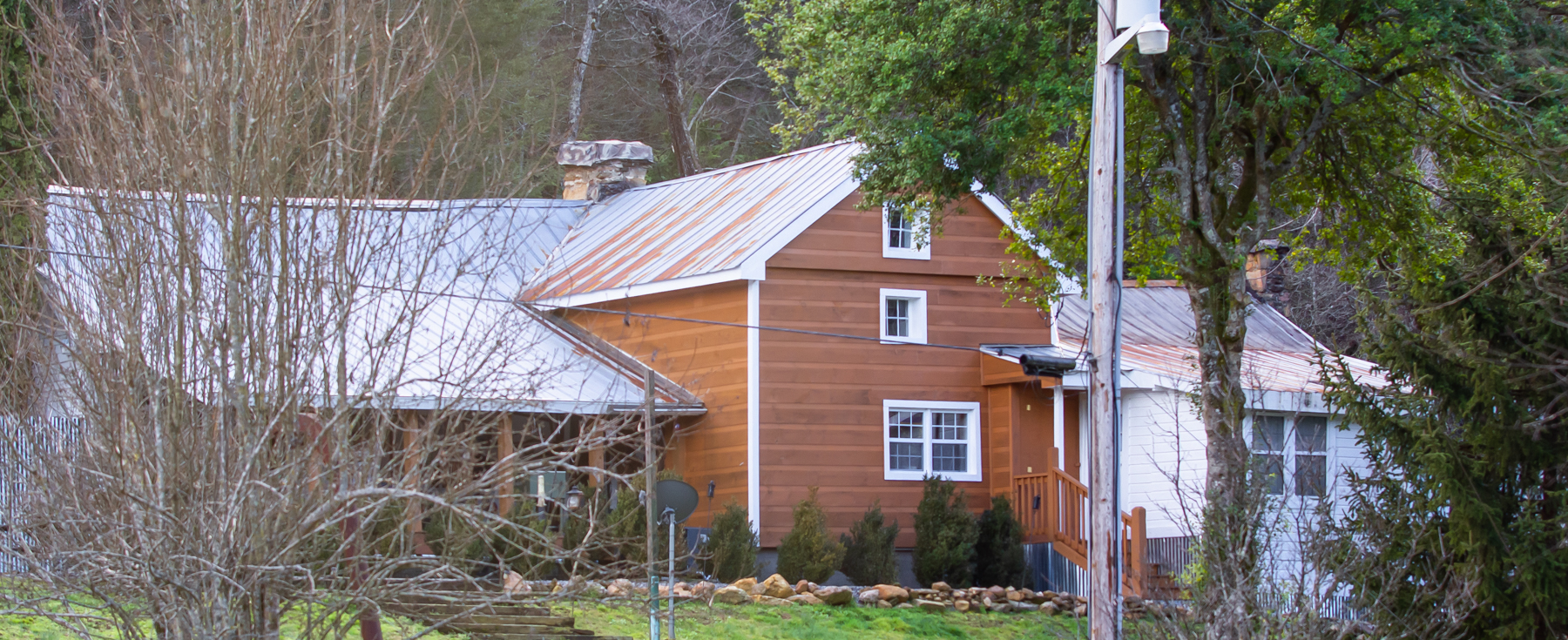

- Location within North Carolina Location within the United States
- Nearest city: Bell View, North Carolina
- Coordinates: 35°0′7″N 84°5′4″W
- Area: 5.9 acres (2.4 ha)
- Built: 1863
- NRHP reference No.: 84000074
- Added to NRHP: October 11, 1984

The John Franklin Cobb House, also known as the Cobb Plantation, is a historic house in rural Cherokee County, North Carolina. The oldest portion of the house is a log structure built in 1863, making it one of the few surviving pre-Civil War structures in the county. It is also notable as a place frequented by baseball legend Ty Cobb in his childhood; he was a grandson of the original builder, John Franklin Cobb. The house is, outside of the log cabin at its core, a rambling structure consisting of a variety of additions to the original log cabin. The house has been enclosed in weatherboarding since the 1880s. It was for many years the center of a farm of some 150-200 acres, and was in the Cobb family until 1977.

The house, as well as outbuildings on a roughly six-acre parcel, were listed on the National Register of Historic Places in 1984. The house is located about two tenths of a mile down a private drive, west of US Route 129-19, about seven-tenths of a mile south of its junction with SR 1583.

== See also ==
- National Register of Historic Places listings in Cherokee County, North Carolina
