= Andrews, North Carolina =

- Town
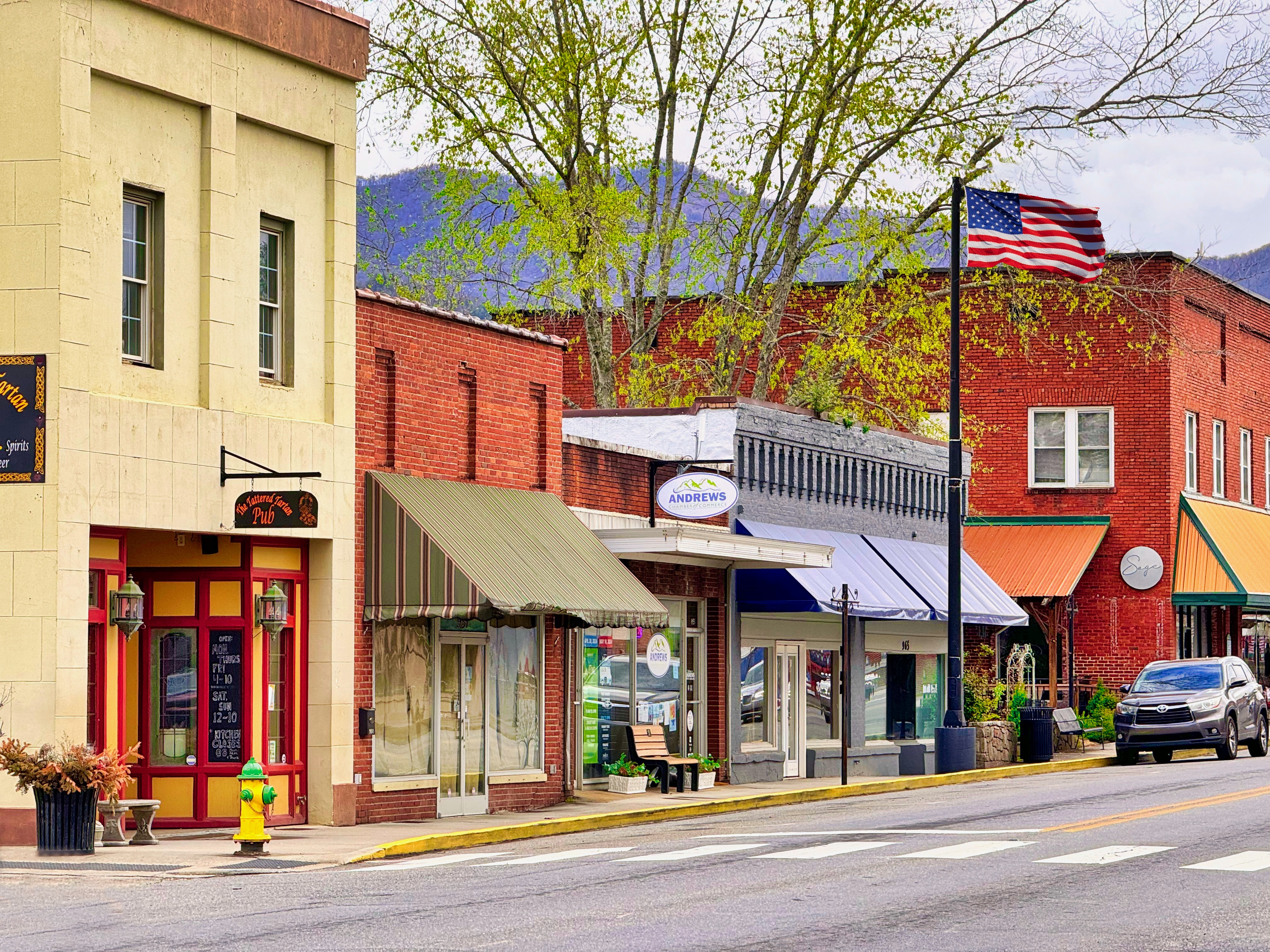
- Main Street

- Seal

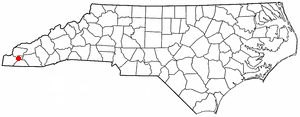
- Location of Andrews, North Carolina
- Coordinates: 35°11′58″N 83°49′33″W
- Country: United States
- State: North Carolina
- County: Cherokee
- Established: 1890
- Incorporated: 1905
- Named for: Col. Alexander Boyd Andrews

Government
  - Mayor: James Reid

Area
  - Total: 1.72 sq mi (4.46 km^{2})
  - Land: 1.72 sq mi (4.46 km^{2})
  - Water: 0 sq mi (0.00 km^{2})
- Elevation: 1,805 ft (550 m)

Population (2020)
  - Total: 1,667
  - Density: 968.5/sq mi (373.93/km^{2})
- Time zone: UTC-5 (Eastern (EST))
  - Summer (DST): UTC-4 (EDT)
- ZIP code: 28901
- Area code: 828
- FIPS code: 37-01380
- GNIS feature ID: 2405151
- Website: www.andrewsnc.org

Andrews is a town in Cherokee County, North Carolina, United States. The population was 1,667 at the 2020 census.

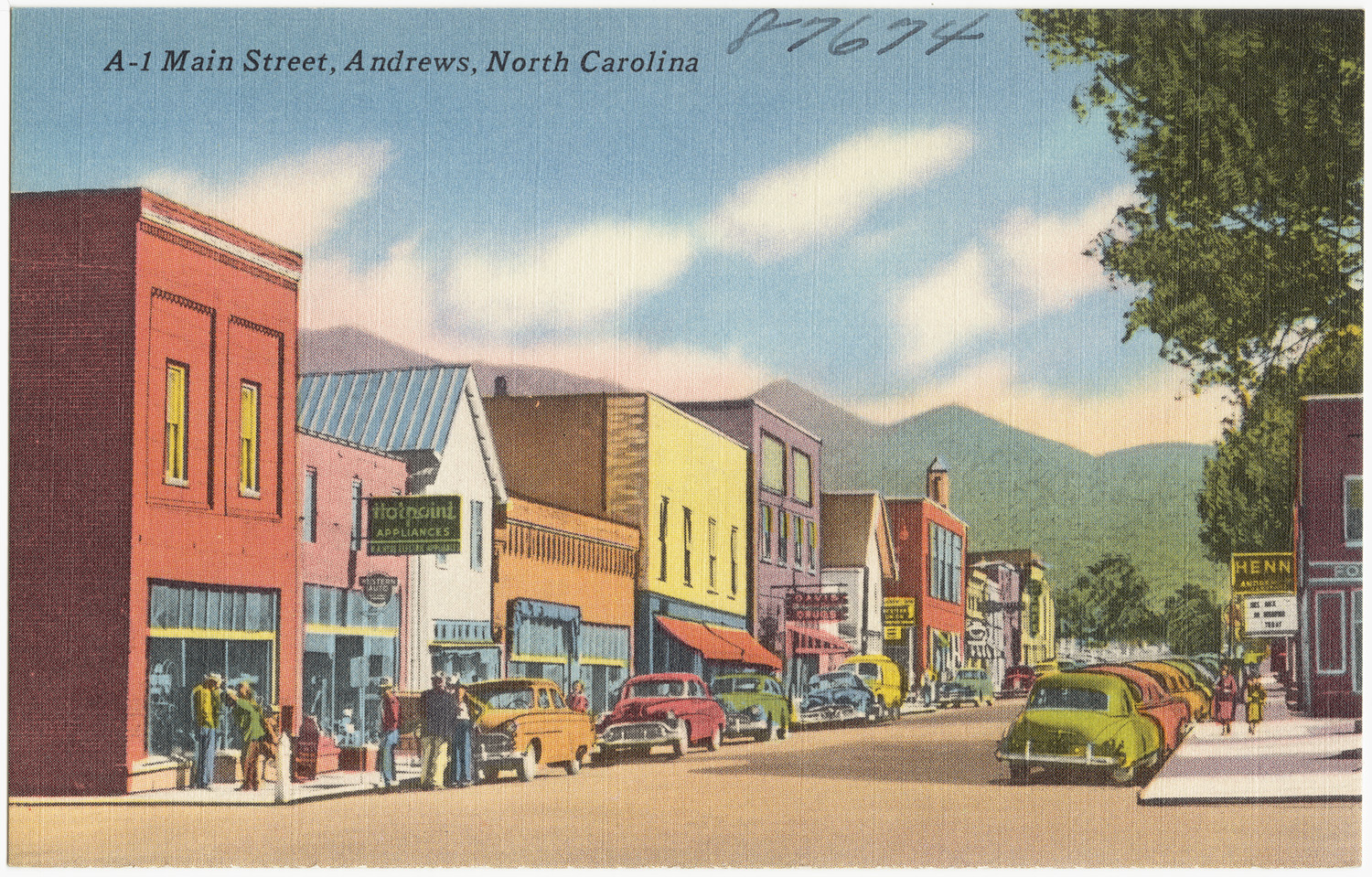
Postcard of main street in 1950s

== History ==
Prior to the arrival of Europeans, the Valley River was inhabited by Muscogee people. They constructed platform mounds in the centers of their towns. At least 14 existed within the limits. By the beginning of the 18th century, the Cherokee had pushed the Muscogee out and taken over their townsites. Many of the towns retained their original names.

Andrews was the site of two substantial Cherokee sister towns, Tomotla and Konohete. The meaning of Tomotla is lost. Konehete or Gu'nahitun'ya on the other hand, can be translated to mean "Long Place" or "Long Valley." The remains of the Andrews Mound survived until 1975, when the land owner bulldozed the structure after it was added to the National Register of Historic Places.

The area was originally called Jamesville, and then the Whitaker Settlement, in honor of settler James Whittaker. The Old Tatham House at the base of Pisgah Road near Andrews was built in 1833. The two-story log cabin built by Thomas Tatham is the oldest surviving structure in the county.

In October 1837, Fort Delaney was constructed in present-day Andrews. It was built by the East Tennessee Mounted Volunteers and served as the U.S. Army’s post for the forced removal of Cherokee people from the upper Valley River valley in June 1838. Up to 1,500 Cherokee people, or about 10 percent of the total Cherokee population, passed through Fort Delaney during the Trail of Tears. A historical marker stands at the area today.

In 1852, Cherokee County’s first industry, a tannery northeast of what would become Andrews, was established by James Stewart. The area's first school was a log structure built on Fairview Road in the early 1880s. In the mid-1880s, David Samuel Russell was placed in charge of a commissary store in nearby Topton by Col. Alexander Boyd Andrews, second vice president of the Richmond and Danville Railroad. During 1888 and 1889, Russell scouted the county looking for a suitable site for his next store. He was reportedly captivated by the Valley River valley and thought it would be the "perfect site for a town." In 1885, Col. Andrews traveled to the site and agreed. He purchased the 50-acre C.A. Colvard farm property in 1890 to erect a railway commissary and divide the land into lots. The first structures at the town site were erected in 1890 by W.P. Walker. The area's earliest post office opened in 1890 and was originally located at Walker's Inn. Trains began visiting in 1891.

=== Establishment ===
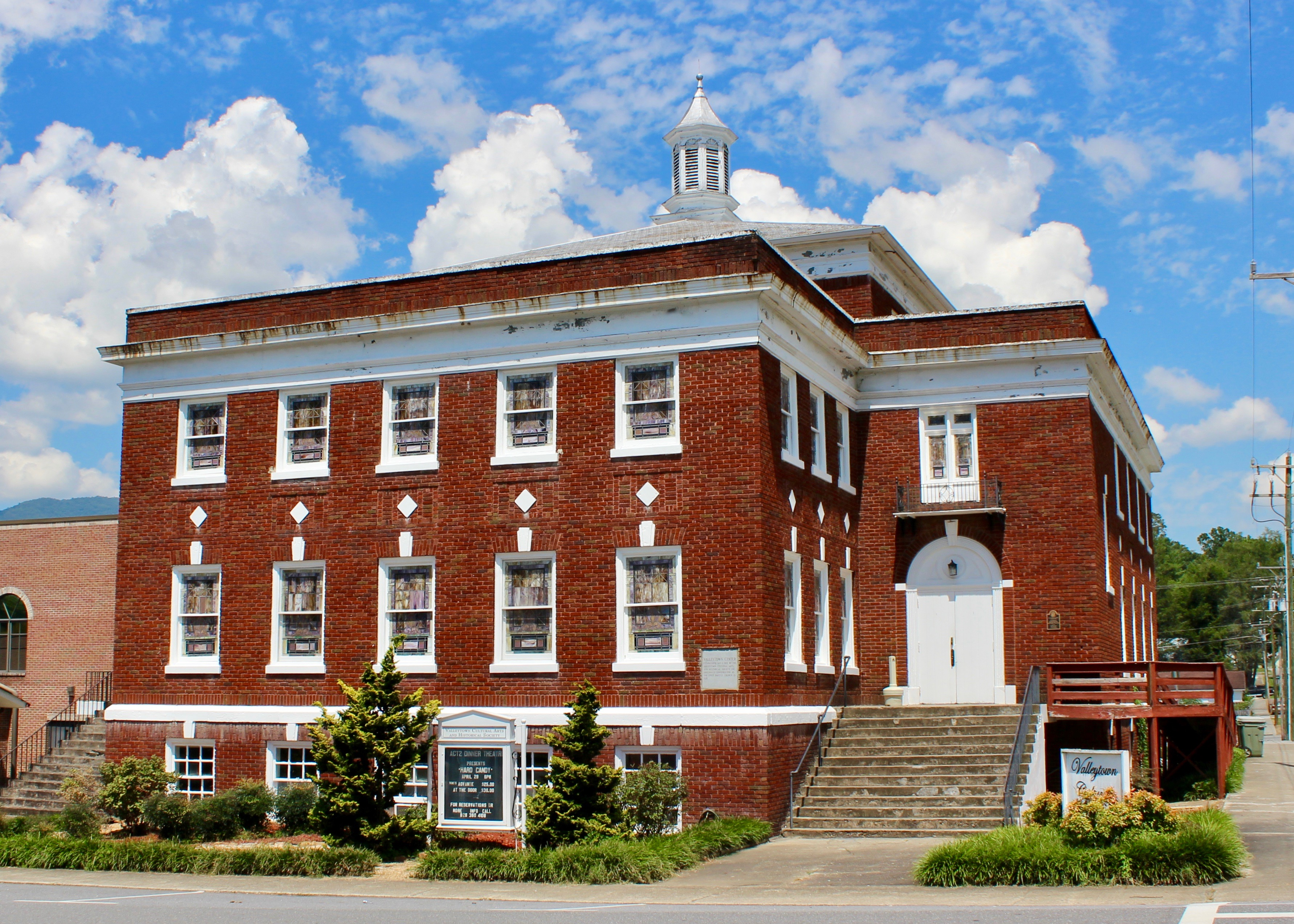
Former First Baptist Church

On February 21, 1905, the town of Andrews was incorporated, with Russell appointed as the first mayor. The Franklin Pierce Cover House, First Baptist Church, and Walker's Inn are listed on the National Register of Historic Places. On October 27, 1906, the dedication of the Andrews Public School occurred, and its first classes began in August 1907 in the Masonic Lodge. The building was used until its demolition in the summer of 1961. The first known brick house in the county, the John Tatham House, was north of Andrews. It was destroyed in the early 1900s.

After African-Americans were forced out of Cumming, Georgia, in 1912, some came to Andrews and started a community called Happytop. A Carnegie library was built in Andrews in 1914. It was demolished in 1979 to make room for the current Andrews Public Library building. The Andrews Public Library joined the Nantahala Regional Library system in 1940.

Andrews was home to the Wilhide brothers, Robert M. and Wilfred W. Wilhide, born between 1920 and 1922. Both were born and raised in Andrews, attended flight school at Cherry Point, North Carolina, and enlisted in the U.S. Marine Corps as pilots during World War II. In the space of several days, after inflicting severe losses upon the Japanese fleet, both brothers were lost and killed during missions near Okinawa. The Wilhide brothers were given a memorial in the Valleytown cemetery, and a monument at Veterans Memorial Park in Andrews, not far from their childhood home and birthplace.

In October 1920, the Peavine Railroad was completed between Andrews and Hayesville. It hauled mainly lumber and was dismantled in 1951. Passenger service between Asheville, Murphy, and Andrews ended in 1948. In the 1940s, Andrews' town hall and police department building was constructed on Main Street; the building was renovated in 1975 and 2015.

=== Late 20th century to present ===
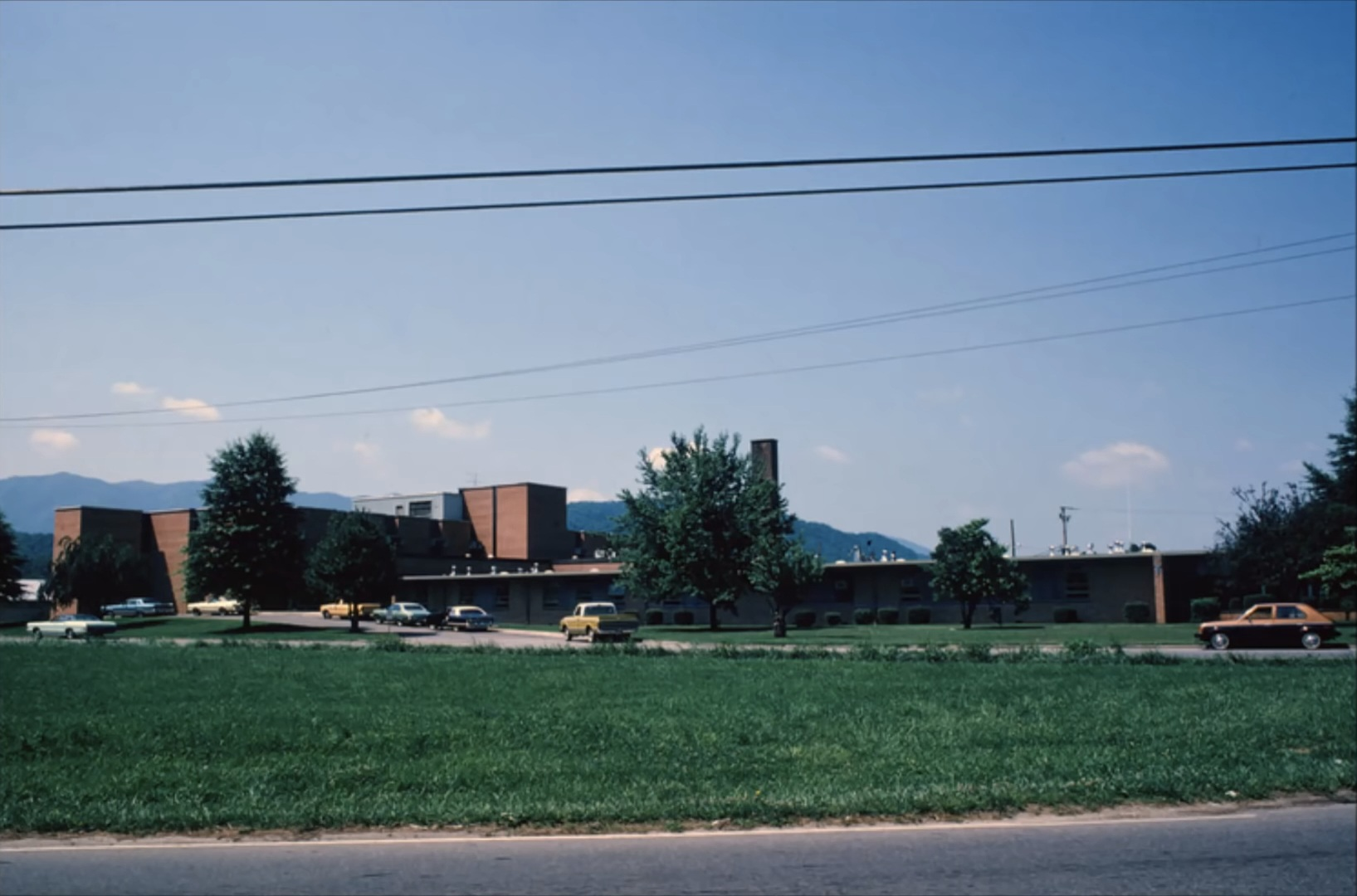
District Memorial Hospital on Whitaker Lane was demolished in 2008. Photo c. 1979.

The town’s first hospital was located downtown on the corner of Locust and Main Streets, founded by Dr. Van Gorder. In 1956, a 30-bed non-profit regional hospital named the District Memorial Hospital of Southwestern North Carolina was constructed in Andrews at a cost of $375,000 (about $4.3 Million today). A complete renovation and expansion was done in 1970, making it a 64-bed facility. Citing uncollected payments, District Memorial declared bankruptcy in 2000, closed in June 2003, and was demolished in late 2008/early 2009. Today the town is served by Erlanger Western Carolina Hospital 12 miles (19 km) southwest in Peachtree. In 1963, the Western North Carolina Wagon Train incorporated its headquarters in Andrews. The wagon train, one of the biggest rallies of horse-and-wagon enthusiasts in the Eastern U.S. and one of the longest-running wagon trains in the nation, runs through Andrews each summer.

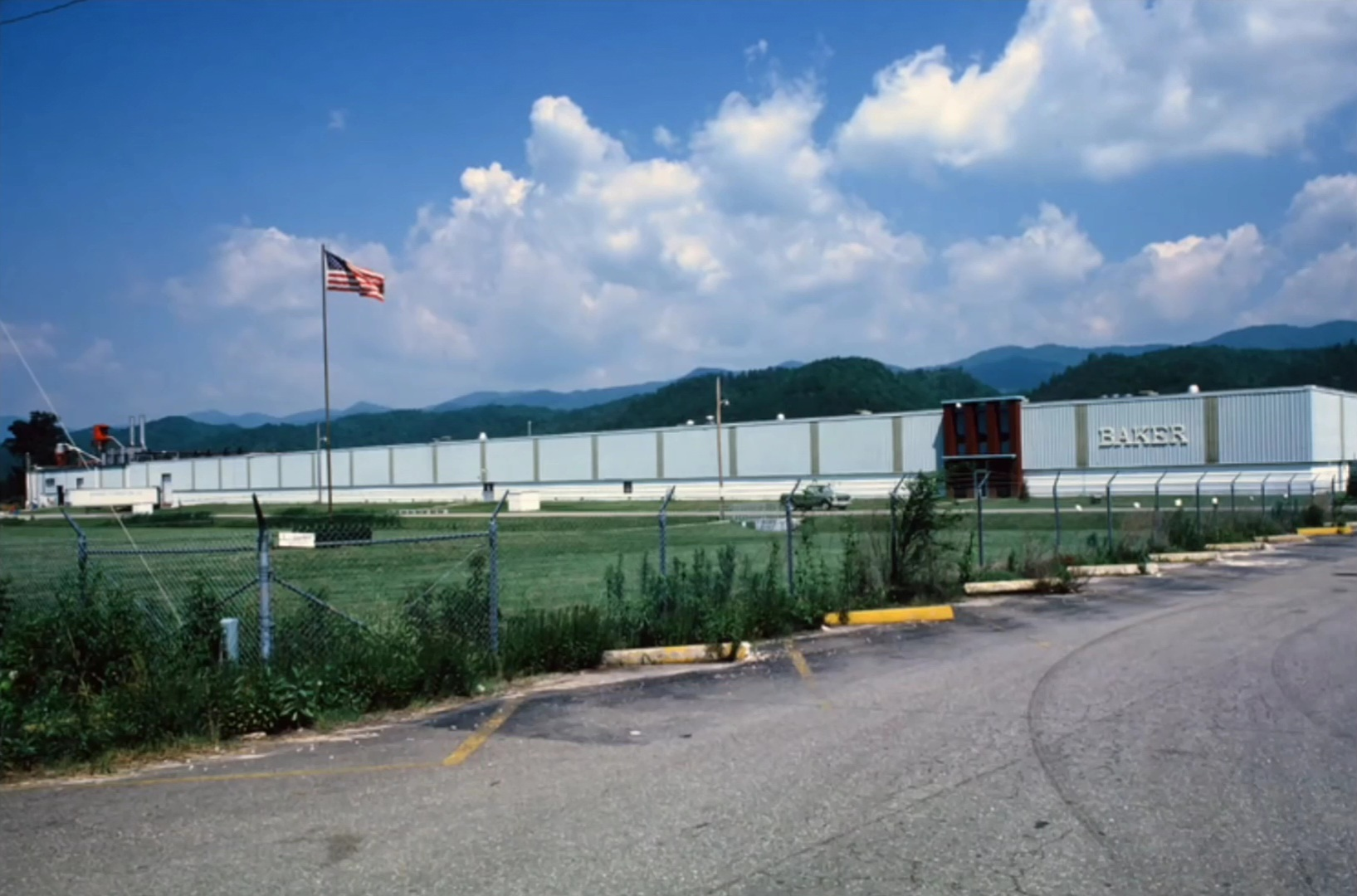
The former Baker Furniture factory in 1979. Baker moved out in 2000.

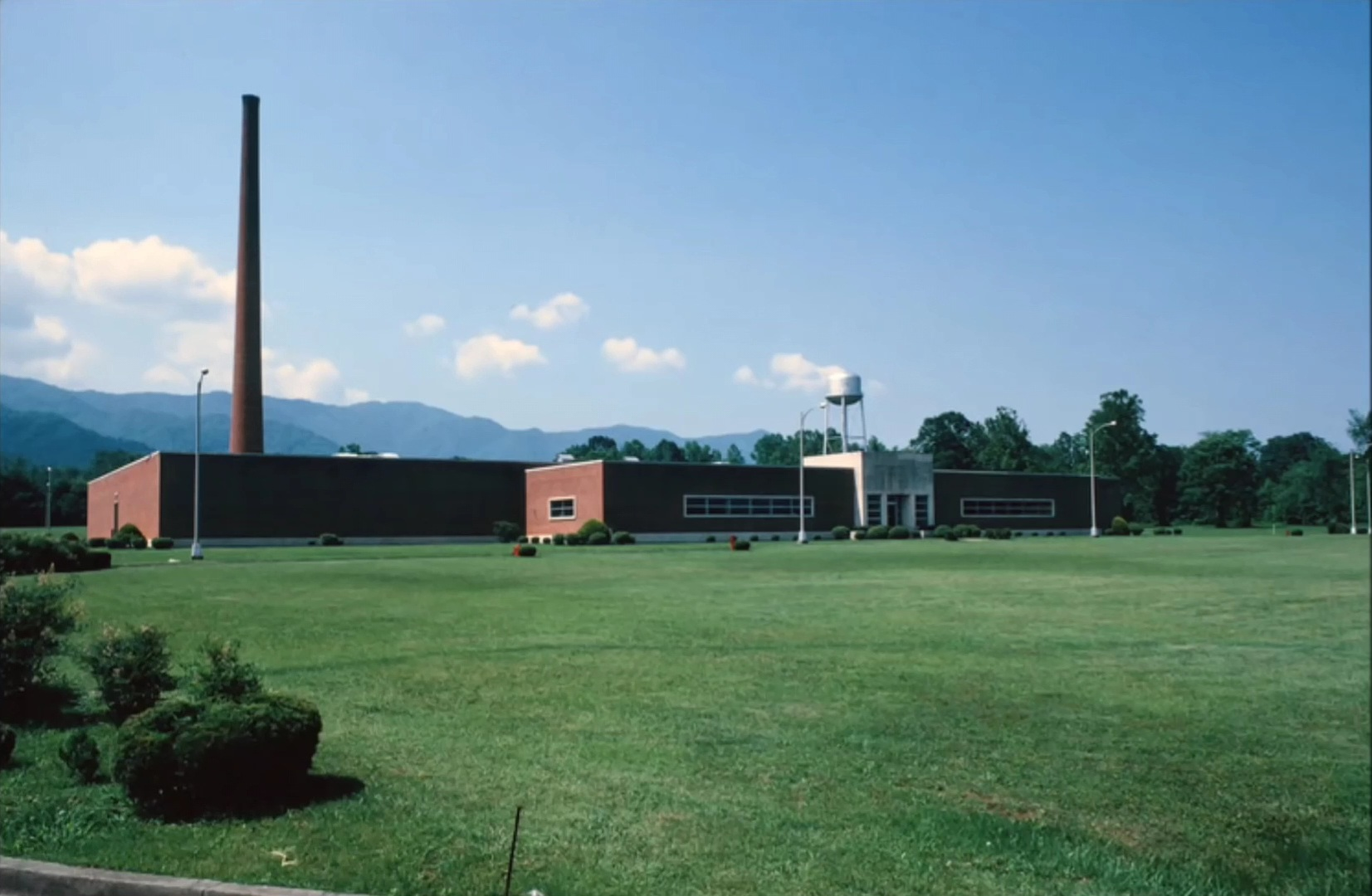
The former Berkshire facility that closed in 1977. It was home to the HD Lee Company from 1979 to 2002. Since 2003, it has been home to Industrial Opportunities Inc.

Industrial Opportunities, Inc. (IOI) was founded in 1974 to serve Cherokee, Clay, and Graham counties. The Andrews nonprofit hires mentally and physically disabled adults to manufacture military, medical, and commercial goods. IOI opened as a 1,200 square foot factory in Marble, North Carolina, and had operated in Marble until early 2003. IOI Road in Marble is the only piece left of IOI in Marble. The current factory was once home to the H.D. Lee company (now just Lee) that opened in 1979 and had been in Andrews for several years until its closure on January 11, 2002. IOI opened its Andrews location on February 28, 2003. It was also home to Berkshire Corporation until its closure in 1977. Baker Furniture and Owenby Manufacturing. Baker Furniture's Andrews plant opened in 1965 as Andrews Furniture Industries, Inc. The plant also made Magnavox stereos and TV cabinets. The plant closed on July 1, 2000. Owenby Manufacturing opened in 1955; its closure date is unknown. Outboard Marine Corporation closed its Andrews plant in 2000, axing 329 jobs. Bombadier Recreational Products moved into the old OMC plant in 2001, hiring around 200 people. The facility was sold to TEAM Industries in 2005. TEAM has operated in Andrews since 1985.

In the mid-1970s, the Andrews dump was closed and covered over after the opening of the countywide landfill. The Andrews Town Pool was built in 1974. In 1976, the West End Plaza shopping center opened on the west side of town on Main Street. A second shopping center, named the Andrews Town Centre, opened in 1990. A four-lane highway was built between Andrews and Murphy around 1977. This new highway was opened in 1979, with its previous alignment through town becoming US 19 Business. Andrews' chamber of commerce was established in May 1985. Bus service to Andrews ended in the 1980s. A 10-mile, 12-inch water line was built to connect Andrews and Murphy's water systems in 1999. The interconnect agreement expired in 2022. Andrews did not charge churches for city water until 1999. Andrews' city limits expanded in June 2000.

The town's annual Spring Fling celebration got its start in 2009. Andrews' annual Christmas on Main event began around 2013. In 2018-2019, the town hosted the last Possum Drop in North Carolina. Since 2018, Andrews has been designated as a Federal Opportunity Zone, which means it's an economically distressed area qualifying for extra tax benefits. The Cherokee County Fair has been held annually at Andrews Recreation Park since 2022. Andrews' weekly farmers market began in 2024. In late 2024, Andrews' leaders unanimously repealed a law that banned weapons on town property, including the pool, library, and police department. Town leaders in 2025 approved a "social district" allowing the open carry of alcoholic beverages in certain parts of the downtown area. As of 2025, Andrews operates the only rest area and public swimming pool in Cherokee County. In early 2026, 86,000 chickens were killed in an overnight poultry farm fire in Andrews. No humans were injured.

== Geography ==
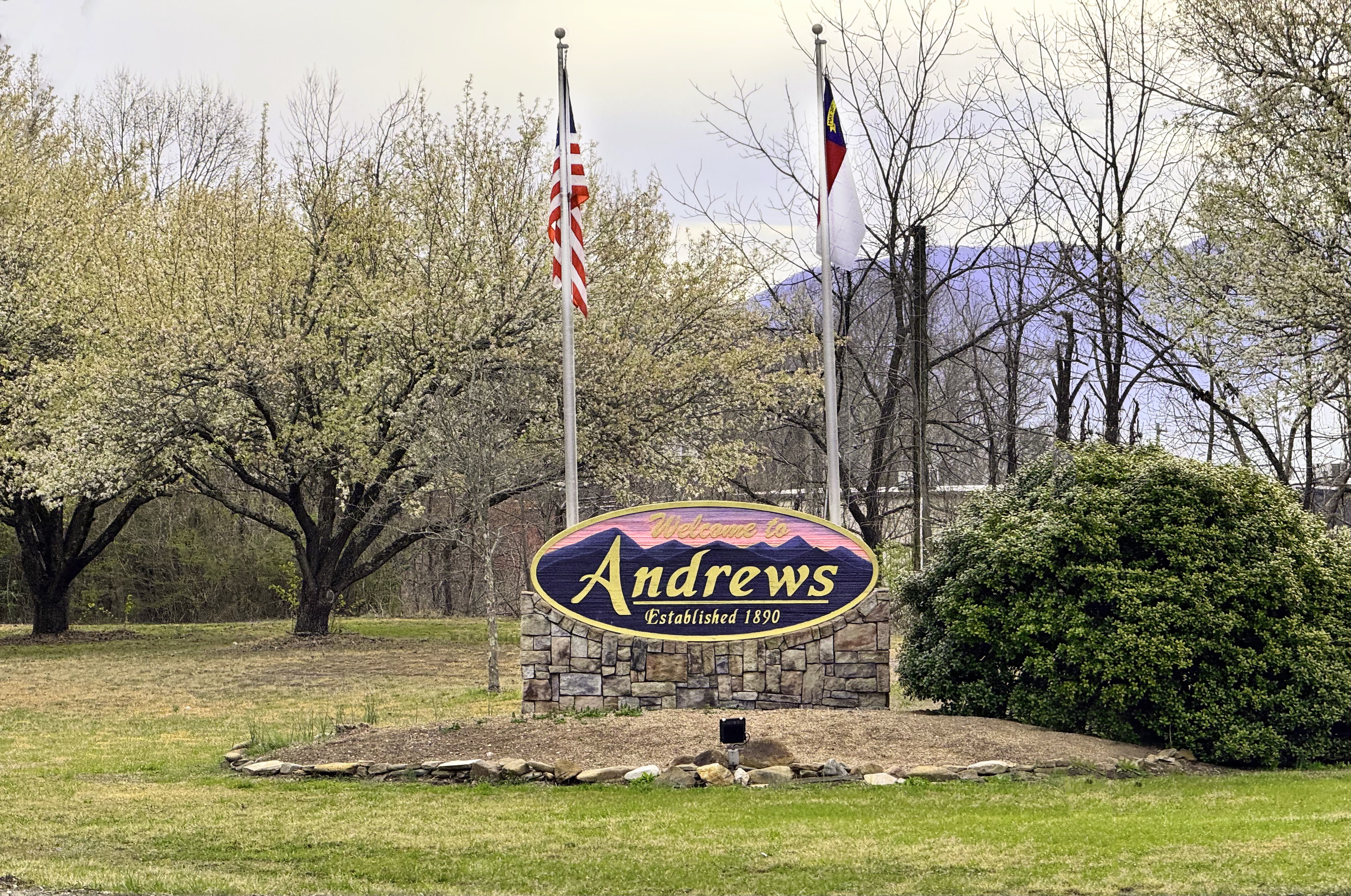
Town sign on U.S. Route 129

Andrews is located in northeastern Cherokee County on the south side of the Valley River, a southwestward-flowing tributary of the Hiwassee River and part of the Tennessee River watershed.

U.S. Routes 19, 74, and U.S. Route 129 form a four-lane bypass around the northern edge of the town; the highways lead northeast 8 miles (13 km) to Topton, where they diverge, and southwest 15 miles (24 km) to Murphy, the county seat. Bryson City is 32 miles (51 km) northeast via US 19/74, and Robbinsville is 20 miles (32 km) north via US 129.

According to the United States Census Bureau, Andrews has a total area of 1.6 square miles (4.2 km^{2}), all land. The Andrews area is home to both of Cherokee County's notable waterfalls – the 55 feet (17 m) tall Cover Falls which opened to the public in June 2026 and the privately-owned Kennedy Falls.

Valleytown Township dominates the eastern part of Cherokee County. The area is bordered by Graham County to the north, Clay County to the south, and Macon County to the east. Within the township are the towns of Marble in the west, Andrews at the center, and Topton in the far east at the Macon and Graham county lines.

=== Climate ===
Climate data for Andrews, North Carolina, 1991–2020 normals, extremes 1909–2008
Month	Jan	Feb	Mar	Apr	May	Jun	Jul	Aug	Sep	Oct	Nov	Dec	Year
Record high °F (°C)	78 (26)	81 (27)	86 (30)	90 (32)	96 (36)	100 (38)	100 (38)	98 (37)	98 (37)	94 (34)	88 (31)	76 (24)	100 (38)
Mean daily maximum °F (°C)	50.0 (10.0)	54.4 (12.4)	61.9 (16.6)	69.7 (20.9)	77.3 (25.2)	83.7 (28.7)	86.2 (30.1)	86.0 (30.0)	81.6 (27.6)	72.4 (22.4)	61.2 (16.2)	53.4 (11.9)	69.8 (21.0)
Daily mean °F (°C)	38.4 (3.6)	41.5 (5.3)	48.3 (9.1)	55.6 (13.1)	63.9 (17.7)	71.1 (21.7)	74.3 (23.5)	73.4 (23.0)	68.6 (20.3)	57.9 (14.4)	47.3 (8.5)	41.3 (5.2)	56.8 (13.8)
Mean daily minimum °F (°C)	26.7 (−2.9)	28.6 (−1.9)	34.8 (1.6)	41.6 (5.3)	50.6 (10.3)	58.5 (14.7)	62.4 (16.9)	60.8 (16.0)	55.7 (13.2)	43.4 (6.3)	33.5 (0.8)	29.1 (−1.6)	43.8 (6.6)
Record low °F (°C)	−19 (−28)	−11 (−24)	−4 (−20)	15 (−9)	23 (−5)	33 (1)	42 (6)	41 (5)	26 (−3)	16 (−9)	0 (−18)	−4 (−20)	−19 (−28)
Average precipitation inches (mm)	5.79 (147)	5.87 (149)	5.42 (138)	4.67 (119)	5.51 (140)	5.57 (141)	5.02 (128)	5.46 (139)	4.85 (123)	3.47 (88)	5.40 (137)	6.08 (154)	63.11 (1,603)
Average precipitation days (≥ 0.01 in)	9.9	9.6	11.2	9.7	10.9	11.5	11.9	11.2	8.3	7.5	9.9	10.8	122.4
Source 1: NOAA (precip/precip days 1981–2010)
Source 2: XMACIS2

== Demographics ==
Historical population
Census	Pop.	Note	%±
1910	936		—
1920	1,634		74.6%
1930	1,748		7.0%
1940	1,520		−13.0%
1950	1,397		−8.1%
1960	1,404		0.5%
1970	1,384		−1.4%
1980	1,621		17.1%
1990	2,551		57.4%
2000	1,602		−37.2%
2010	1,781		11.2%
2020	1,667		−6.4%
2022 (est.)	1,690	▲	1.4%
U.S. Decennial Census

Andrews' homeless population was 12 as of 2025.

=== Racial and ethnic composition ===
Andrews town, North Carolina – Racial and ethnic composition Note: the US Census treats Hispanic/Latino as an ethnic category. This table excludes Latinos from the racial categories and assigns them to a separate category. Hispanics/Latinos may be of any race.
Race / Ethnicity (NH = Non-Hispanic)	Pop 2000	Pop 2010	Pop 2020	% 2000	% 2010	% 2020
White alone (NH)	1,483	1,550	1,388	92.57%	87.03%	83.26%
Black or African American alone (NH)	39	12	21	2.43%	0.67%	1.26%
Native American or Alaska Native alone (NH)	11	18	25	0.69%	1.01%	1.50%
Asian alone (NH)	0	1	0	0.00%	0.06%	0.00%
Native Hawaiian or Pacific Islander alone (NH)	0	0	0	0.00%	0.00%	0.00%
Other race alone (NH)	0	0	4	0.00%	0.00%	0.24%
Mixed race or Multiracial (NH)	27	66	90	1.69%	3.71%	5.40%
Hispanic or Latino (any race)	42	134	139	2.62%	7.52%	8.34%
Total	1,602	1,781	1,667	100.00%	100.00%	100.00%

=== 2020 census ===
As of the 2020 census, Andrews had a population of 1,667. The median age was 39.2 years. 23.2% of residents were under the age of 18 and 18.8% of residents were 65 years of age or older. For every 100 females there were 86.3 males, and for every 100 females age 18 and over there were 87.8 males age 18 and over.

0.0% of residents lived in urban areas, while 100.0% lived in rural areas.

There were 707 households in Andrews, of which 31.5% had children under the age of 18 living in them. Of all households, 31.5% were married-couple households, 24.9% were households with a male householder and no spouse or partner present, and 34.4% were households with a female householder and no spouse or partner present. About 35.8% of all households were made up of individuals and 16.3% had someone living alone who was 65 years of age or older. There were 400 families residing in the town.

There were 895 housing units, of which 21.0% were vacant. The homeowner vacancy rate was 3.6% and the rental vacancy rate was 8.3%.

=== 2010 census ===
In the 2010 census, the total population was 1,781 people residing in 780 households including 452 family units. The population density was 1,090 people per square mile.

== Government ==
=== Mayors ===
1. David Samuel Russell (1905–1929)
2. J.H. Christy (1929–1931)
3. D.S. Russell (1931–)
4. D.H. Tillitt (c.1939-1940)
5. R.T. Heaton (1941-1945)
6. B.P. Grant (1945-)
7. L.L. Love (????-c.1959)
8. Percy B. Ferebee (c.1961–1970)
9. Paul Parker (1970-1971, Mayor pro tempore)
10. Ty Burnette (1971–1986)
11. Jim Dailey (c.1999-2001)
12. Mitch Rhinehardt (2001–2004)
13. Johnny Brown (2005–2013)
14. Nancy Curtis (2013–2017)
15. James Reid (2017–present)

== Education ==
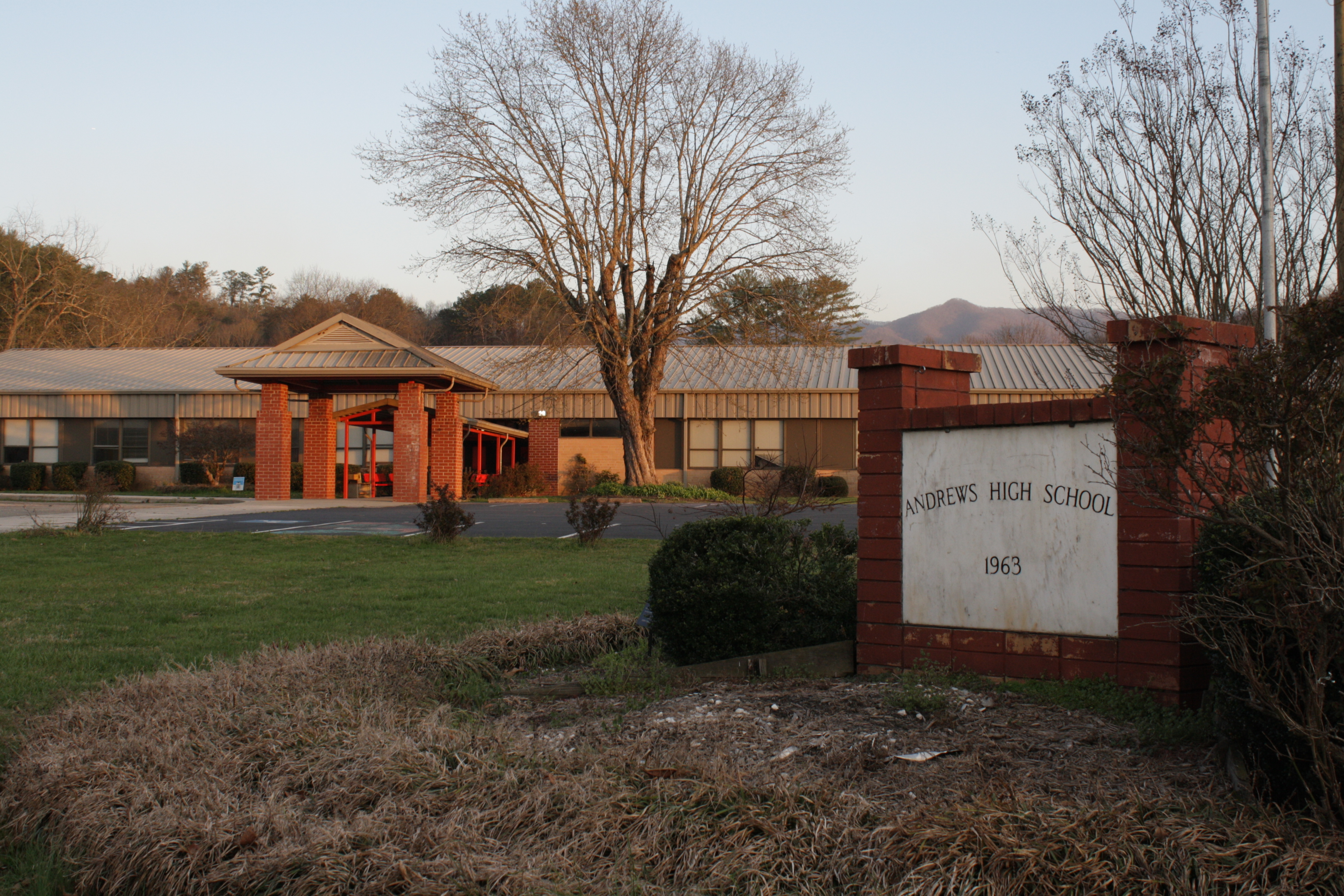
Andrews High School

The town of Andrews has three schools. Andrews Elementary, Andrews Middle, and Andrews High School are part of the Cherokee County School System.

Until the early 1960s, all Andrews schools were located next to each other on the property of the current elementary school. A 1935 topographic map of Andrews shows each school building, marked with a flag, located adjacent to each other on Walnut Street (now Jean Christy Avenue) and Fourth Street. The current high school and current elementary school appears first in the 1975 map. Between 1935 and 1975, the school zone has dramatically changed.

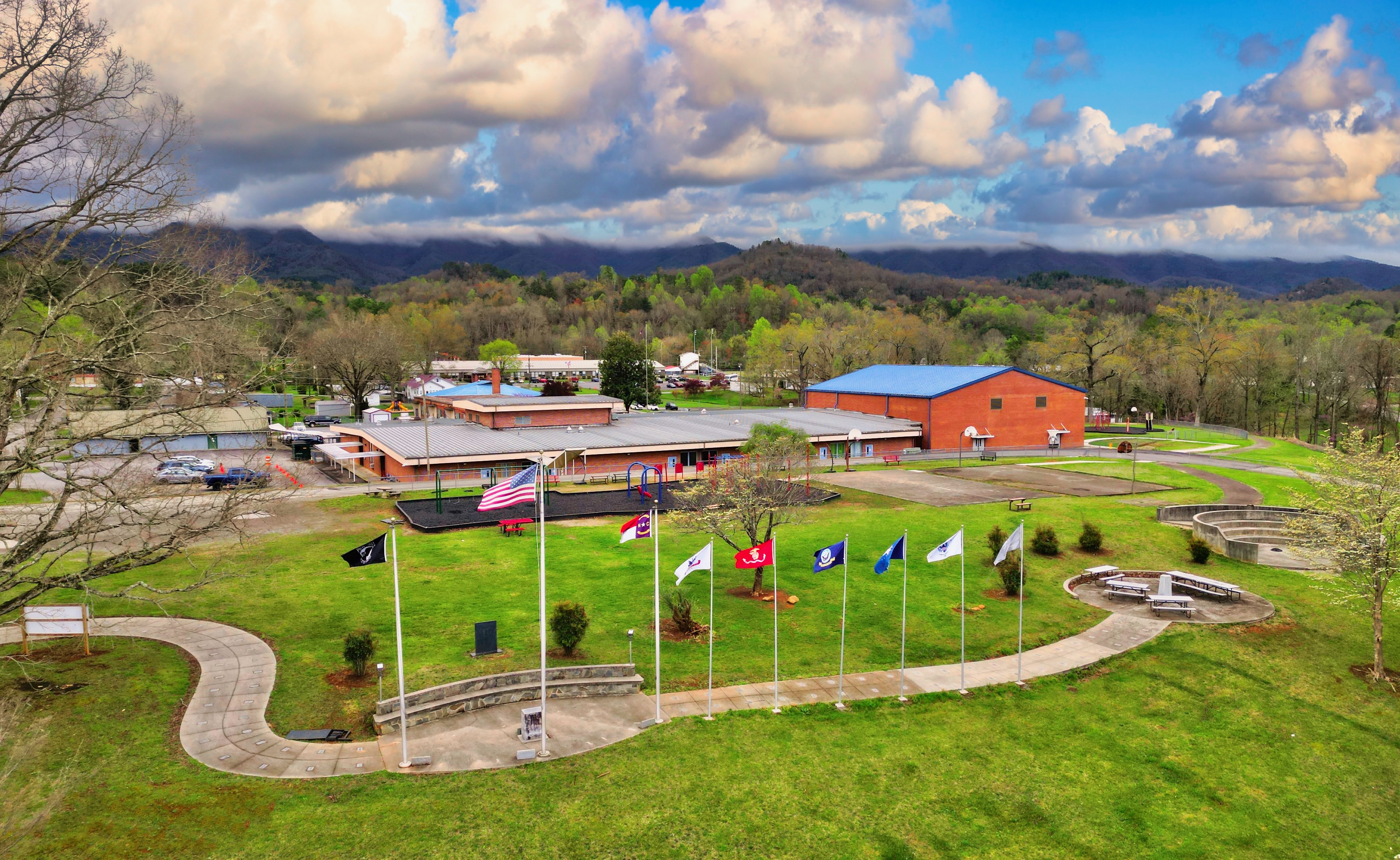
Andrews Elementary School

Andrews Elementary (AES) is a Pre-K thru Grade 5 school. The current school building was constructed in 1951 as the Andrews Primary School. The building has had two expansions. In 1975, new classrooms, a cafeteria, a school library, and a separate building (for Pre-K) were added. This first expansion happened after the Andrews Grammar School, which was located just to the right of the small primary school building, was burned. After 1975, the school was Andrews Elementary. The school's second and most recent expansion occurred in 2003, with the addition of a gymnasium connected to the building on the west side of the building. The old rock gym built in 1934 east of the school closed in May 1999 due to safety concerns and was demolished that December. With this expansion, Jean Christy Avenue was cut off and is now only a loop in the front of the school, and a road leading up to a turn onto Fourth Street behind the school.

Andrews High School (AHS) is a 9 thru 12 school built in 1963, after a fire burned down the second campus built in 1914. It was incorporated by the North Carolina General Assembly in 1893. The school most likely opened in 1890, after the establishment of the town's name. From 1963 to 1999, Andrews High held students of Junior and Senior High.

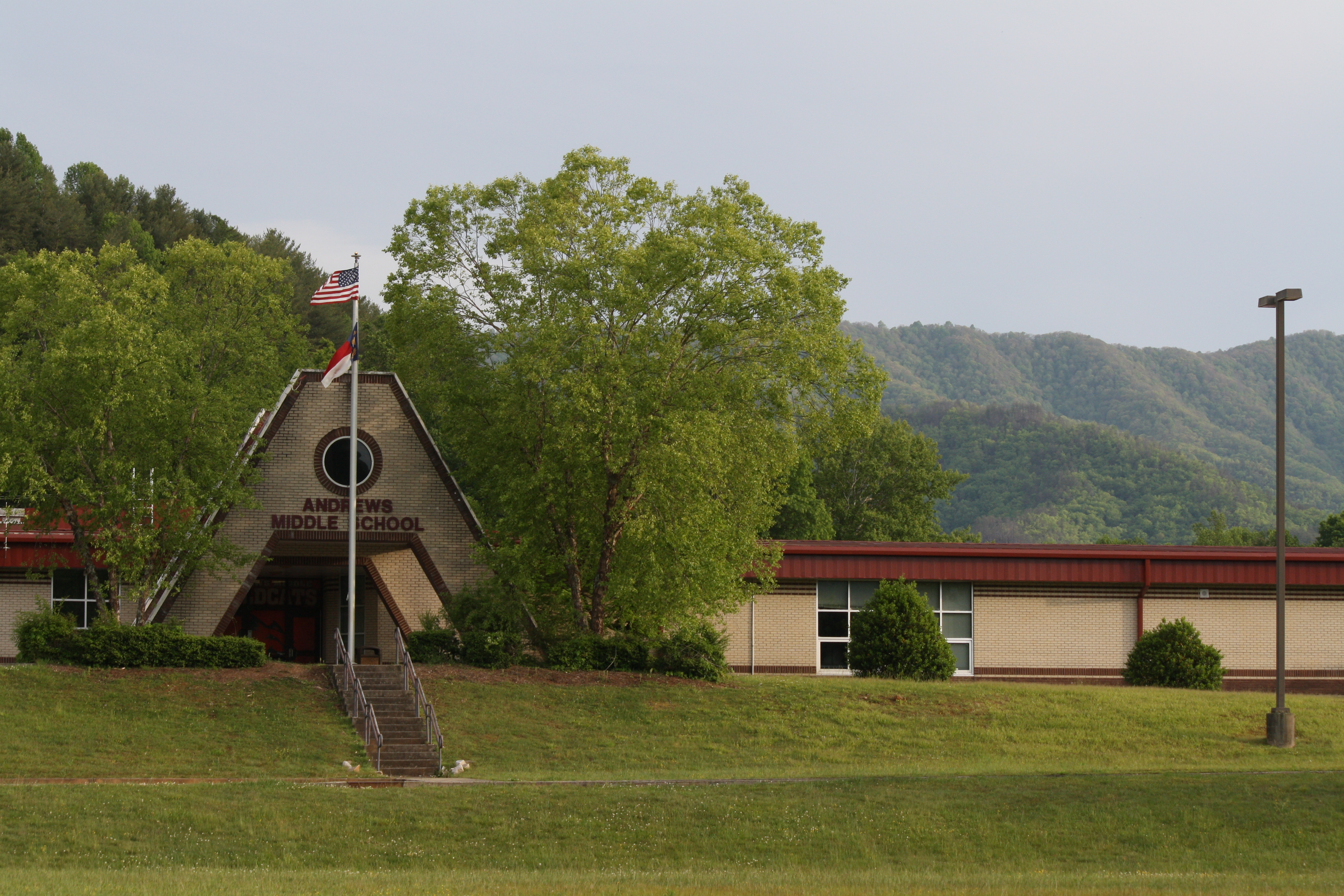
Andrews Middle School

In 1998, a new campus built between Wakefield Road and US-19 Business was constructed. The 25-acres of land that this campus was built on was donated by the H.D. Lee factory (now the Industrial Opportunities, Inc. factory) west of the site. This site was the home of the new, $4.89 million Andrews Middle School, established and opened on August 9, 1999. Junior High was turned to Middle School, and AES and AHS operated as a Pk–5 and a 9–12 school.

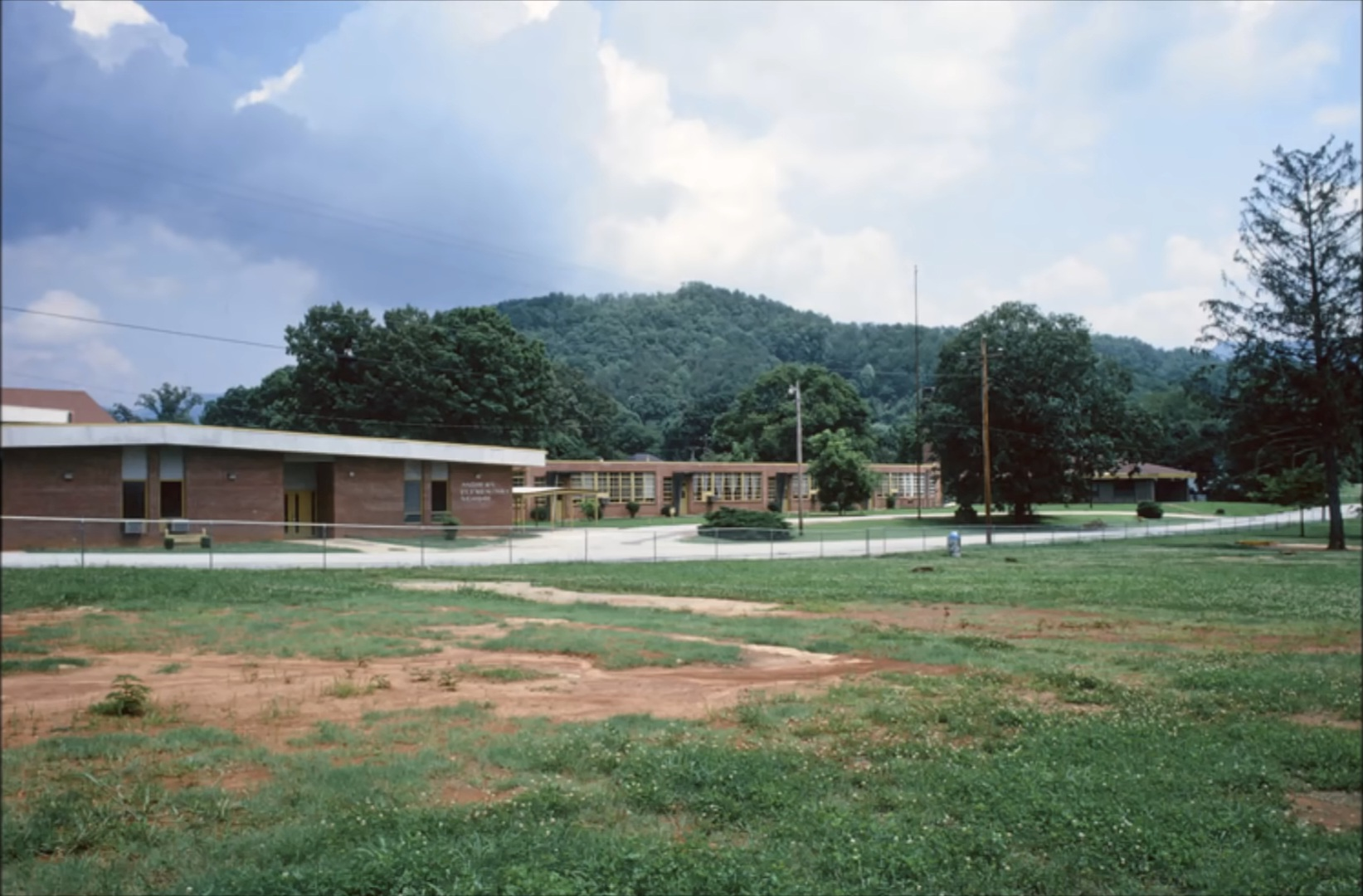
Andrews Elementary School in 1979. At the time this photo was taken, AES operated as a Pre-K through Grade 6 school and had just had its first expansion 4 years earlier.

Andrews Elementary, Junior, and Senior High School were part of the Andrews City School District. Each city school district (Andrews and Murphy) had their own board of education and superintendent. Each district was in charge of many purchases for their schools, such as school transportation. Andrews was the first in Cherokee County to receive a school bus in 1926 and the first to receive an activity bus in 1951. The individual districts merged with Cherokee County Schools in 1969.

After the merger of Andrews and Murphy's districts in 1969, Cherokee County's superintendent was John Jordan.

== Media ==
Andrews was served by the weekly Andrews Journal newspaper from 1959 until January 1, 2019, when it merged with the Cherokee Scout in Murphy. Andrews no longer has a newspaper of its own. After the town's newspaper closed, Mayor James Reid began offering a quarterly e-newsletter.

== Infrastructure ==
=== Transportation ===
The Western Carolina Regional Airport is a county-owned public-use airport located 2 miles (3.2 km) west of the central business district of Andrews.

Andrews was served by railroad from 1891 until the 1980s when Norfolk Southern decided to close the Murphy Branch west of Sylva, North Carolina, because of declining freight traffic. The Great Smoky Mountains Railroad operated passenger excursions from Dillsboro, North Carolina to Andrews from 1988 until 2010.

=== Law enforcement ===
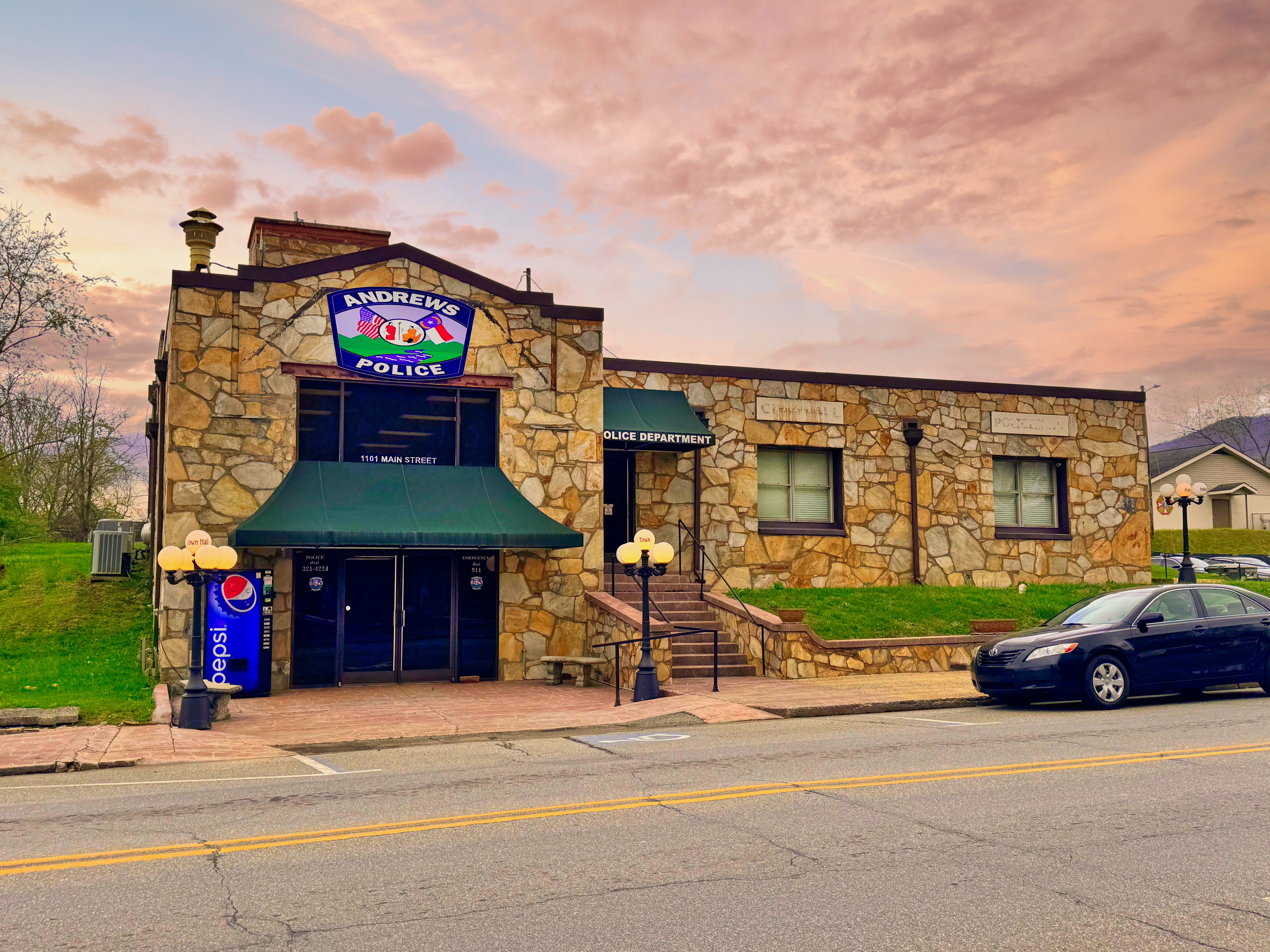
Andrews' police department was the town hall until 2023

The Andrews Police Department occupies a 1940s stone building that was also the town hall until the city administration moved to a building on West End Plaza in 2023.

In March 2014, four officers resigned in protest after an uncertified administrative police chief was hired. The town's police department again faced turmoil in the early 2020s, according to the Cherokee Scout newspaper, as it went through eight police chiefs in six years and the town became known as a "chief killer." In 2020, the police chief resigned after the mayor ordered him to establish checkpoints and harass visitors to prevent COVID-19 from entering Andrews. In 2021, an officer wrecked a patrol car at a high speed downtown. Afterwards, officers contemplated disabling their automatic vehicle locators so they couldn't be tracked. That same year the city's entire police force was suspended after officers reportedly moved cameras facing locations like the station's evidence room. In May 2023, the assistant chief was wounded after he was accidentally shot with an AR-15 style rifle. In June 2023, a female officer who allegedly stalked a 16-year-old Andrews High School student she dated was ordered to stay away from the girl. In September 2023, the police chief was suspended after he was charged with obtaining property under false pretenses and obstruction of justice. He died before arrest.

== Notable people ==
- Dave Bristol – Major League Baseball manager
- Charles Frazier – National Book Award-winning author, grew up in Andrews
