= Samuel Cobb House =

Historic building in Portland, Oregon, U.S.

- U.S. National Register of Historic Places
- Portland Historic Landmark
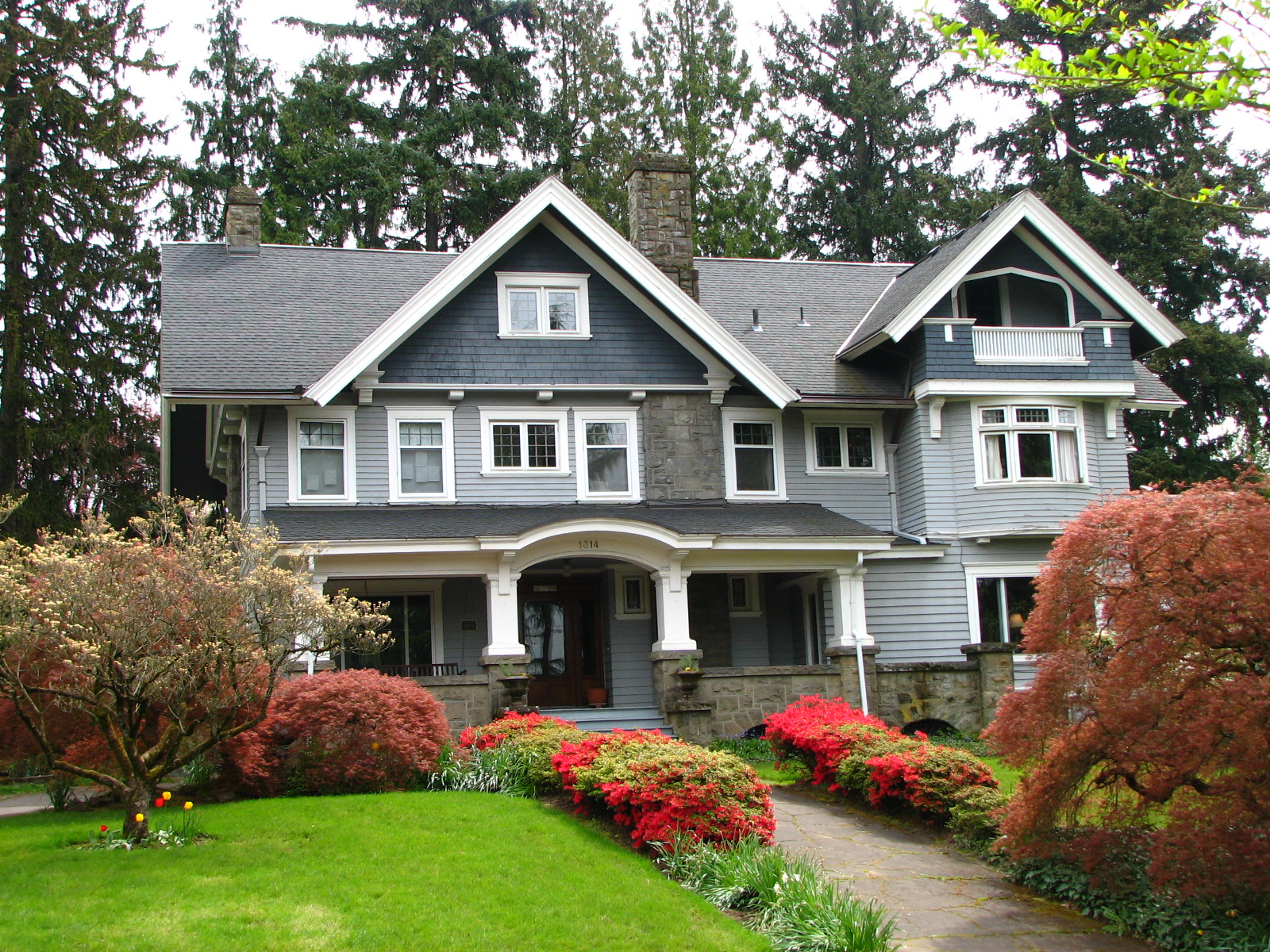
- Samuel Cobb House in 2008
- Location: 1314 SE 55th Avenue; Portland, Oregon
- Coordinates: 45°30′48″N 122°36′23″W
- Area: 0.5 acres (0.20 ha)
- Built: 1911
- Architect: Samuel Cobb
- Architectural style: Bungalow/Craftsman
- NRHP reference No.: 99000607
- Added to NRHP: May 20, 1999

The Samuel Cobb House is a building in southeast Portland, Oregon, listed on the National Register of Historic Places.

== See also ==
- National Register of Historic Places listings in Southeast Portland, Oregon
