= Cyrus B. Cobb House =

Historic house in Minnesota, US

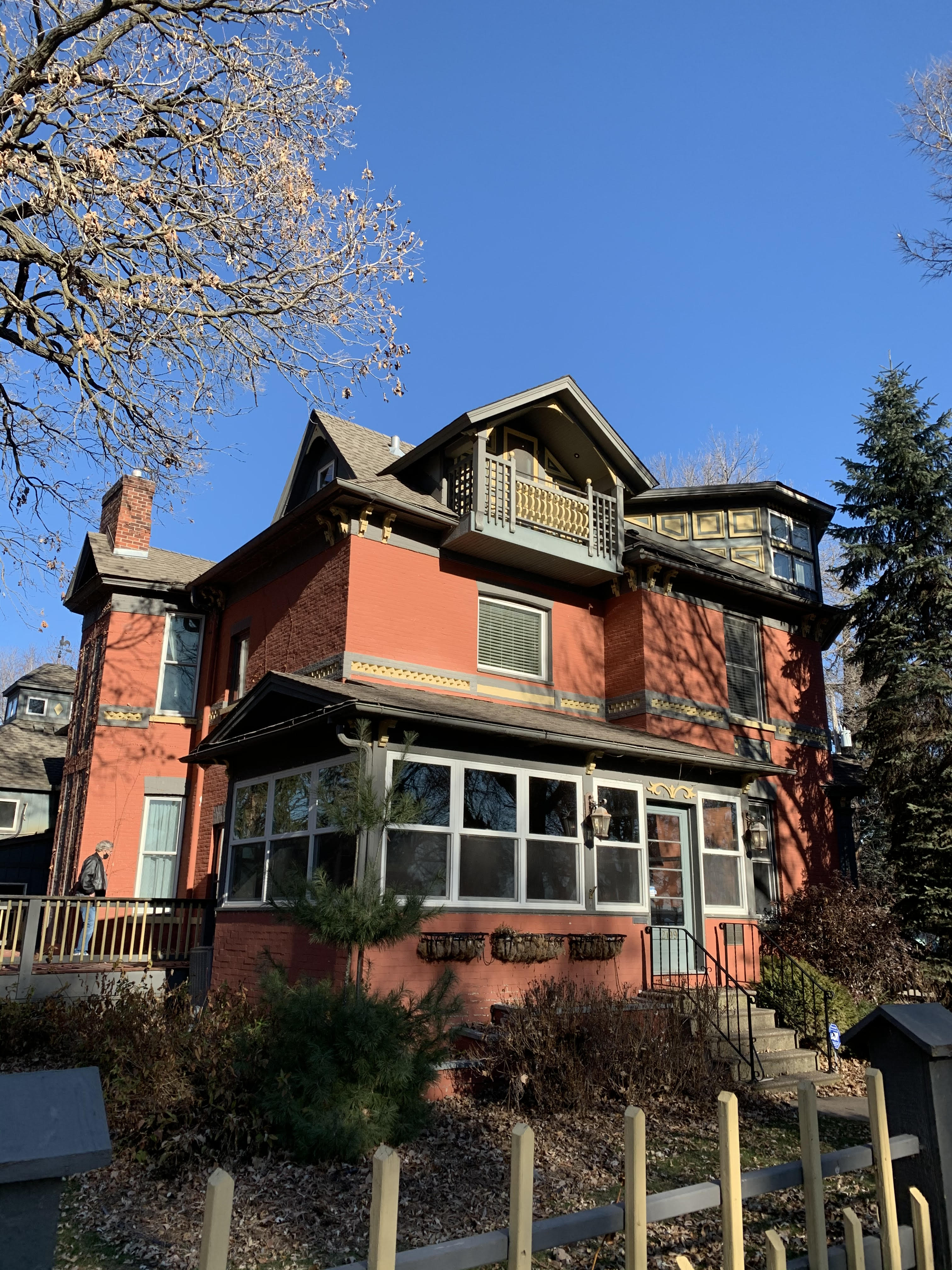
C.B. Cobb House as seen in December 2020

The Cyrus B. Cobb House is a home built circa 1885 in White Bear Lake, Minnesota. Originally built as a private residence for C.B. Cobb, a prominent White Bear Lake businessman and lumber dealer, the home later served as a rectory for a local church, was known as White Bear Lake Tavern (or Curry's Tavern) from 1912 to 1923, and a private residence. The solid brick house was designed in the Queen Anne architectural style and is one of the few substantial year-round brick homes remaining in the community. It is the only private home in White Bear Lake on the National Register of Historic Places.
