= Cobb Building =

Cobb Building may refer to:

- Cobb Building (Wagoner, Oklahoma)
- Cobb Building (Seattle)

== See also ==
- Cobbs and Mitchell Building
