= Harris Creek (Valley River tributary) =

Stream in North Carolina, USA

Harris Creek Tributary to Valley River
- Location of Harris Creek mouth Harris Creek (Valley River tributary) (the United States)

Location
- Country: United States
- State: North Carolina
- County: Cherokee

Physical characteristics
- Source: Junaluska Creek divide
  - location: about 2 miles southeast of Rhodo, North Carolina
  - coordinates: 35°12′09″N 083°44′01″W
  - elevation: 3,540 ft (1,080 m)
- Mouth: Valley River
  - location: about 0.25 miles southwest of Rhodo, North Carolina
  - coordinates: 35°13′02″N 083°45′17″W
  - elevation: 2,082 ft (635 m)
- Length: 2.04 mi (3.28 km)
- Basin size: 1.63 square miles (4.2 km^{2})
- Discharge
  - location: Valley River
  - average: 4.87 cu ft/s (0.138 m^{3}/s) at mouth with Valley River

Basin features
- Progression: Valley River → Hiawassee River → Tennessee River → Ohio River → Mississippi River → Gulf of Mexico
- River system: Hiawassee River
- Tributaries
  - left: Granny Squirrel Branch
  - right: unnamed tributaries
- Bridges: US 19-US 129

Harris Creek is a 2.04 mi (3.28 km) long 2nd order tributary to the Valley River in Cherokee County, North Carolina.

== Course ==
Harris Creek rises on the Junaluska Creek divide in Cherokee County and flows northwest to join Valley River about 0.25 miles southwest of Rhodo, North Carolina.

== Watershed ==
Harris Creek drains 1.63 square miles (4.2 km^{2}) of area, receives about 68.6 in/year of precipitation, and has a wetness index of 217.91 and is about 91% forested.
