= Grape Creek =

Grape Creek may refer to:

- Grape Creek (Colorado), a tributary of the Arkansas
- Grape Creek (Hiwassee River tributary), a stream in North Carolina
- Grape Creek, North Carolina, an unincorporated community
- Grape Creek, Texas, an unincorporated community
