= Granny Squirrel Branch =

Stream in North Carolina, USA

Granny Squirrel Branch Tributary to Harris Creek
- Location of Granny Squirrel Branch mouth Granny Squirrel Branch (the United States)

Location
- Country: United States
- State: North Carolina
- County: Cherokee

Physical characteristics
- Source: Worm Creek divide
  - location: Granny Squirrel Gap
  - coordinates: 35°12′27″N 083°45′45″W
  - elevation: 2,200 ft (670 m)
- Mouth: Harris Creek
  - location: about 0.25 miles southwest of Rhodo, North Carolina
  - coordinates: 35°13′00″N 083°45′21″W
  - elevation: 2,080 ft (630 m)
- Length: 1.09 mi (1.75 km)
- Basin size: 0.29 square miles (0.75 km^{2})
- Discharge
  - location: Harris Creek
  - average: 0.84 cu ft/s (0.024 m^{3}/s) at mouth with Valley River

Basin features
- Progression: generally north
- River system: Hiawassee River
- Tributaries
  - left: unnamed tributaries
  - right: unnamed tributaries
- Bridges: US 19-129, Tunnel Ridge Road

Granny Squirrel Branch is a 1.09 mi (1.75 km) long 1st order tributary to Harris Creek in Cherokee County, North Carolina. Granny Squirrel Branch is the only stream of this name in the United States and is a tributary to Harris Creek.

According to tradition, "Granny Squirrel" was originally the name of an elderly Native American Indian woman who lived in the area.

== Course ==
Granny Squirrel Branch rises in Granny Squirrel Gap in Cherokee County, North Carolina and then flows north to join Harris Creek about 0.25 miles southwest of Rhodo, North Carolina.

== Watershed ==
Granny Squirrel Branch drains 0.29 square miles (0.75 km^{2}) of area, receives about 66.97 in/year of precipitation, and has a wetness index of 248.46 and is about 77% forested.
