= Valley River =

Stream in North Carolina, USA

Valley River Tributary to Hiawassee River
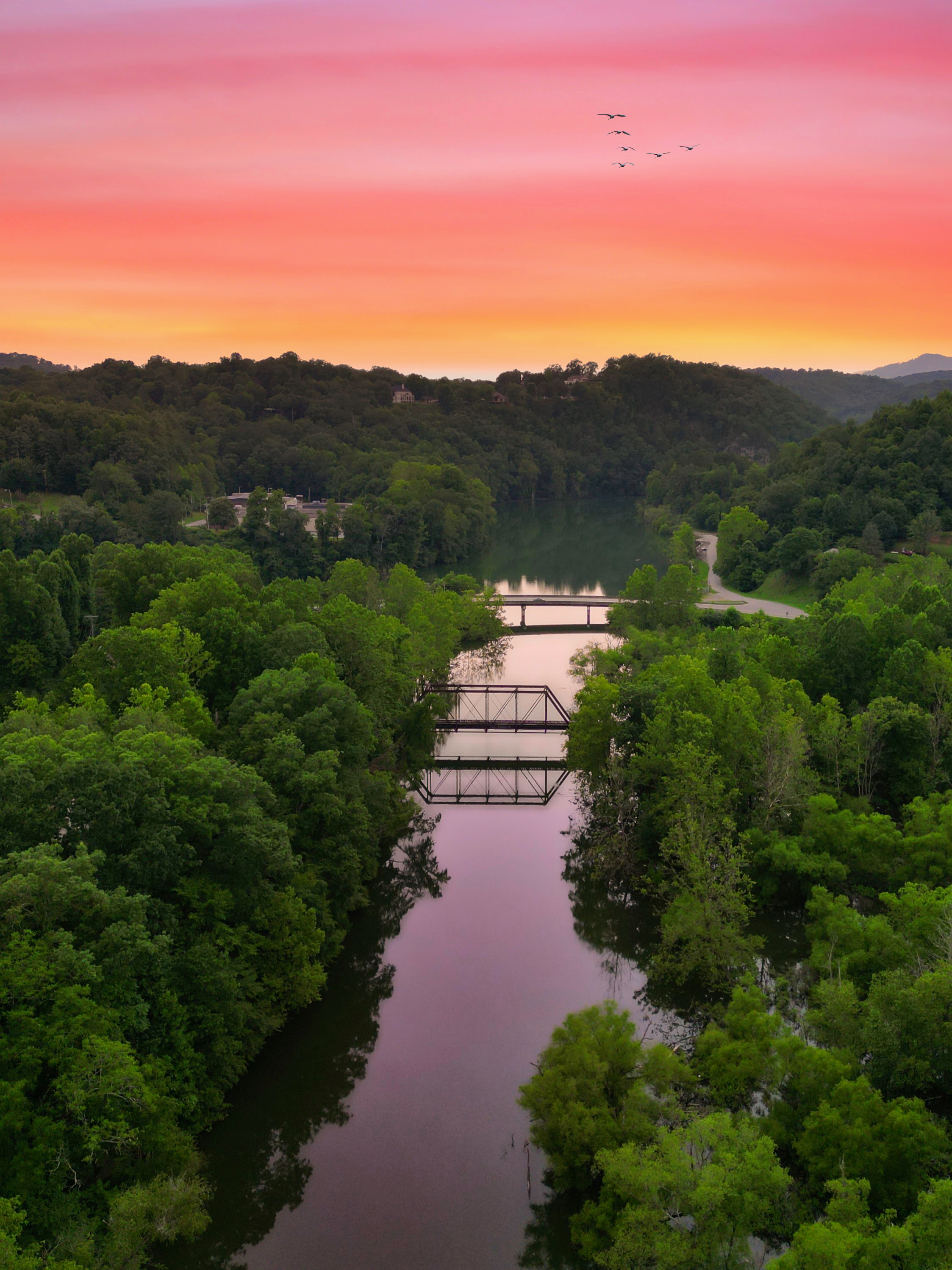
- Old railroad bridge over the Valley River in Murphy, North Carolina, in July 2023

- Location of Valley River mouth Valley River (the United States)

Location
- Country: United States
- State: North Carolina
- County: Cherokee
- City: Andrews; Murphy

Physical characteristics
- Source: Tulula Creek divide
  - location: about 2 miles northwest of Topton, North Carolina
  - coordinates: 35°15′24″N 083°42′42″W
  - elevation: 3,520 ft (1,070 m)
- Mouth: Hiwassee River
  - location: Murphy, North Carolina
  - coordinates: 35°05′33″N 084°02′22″W
  - elevation: 1,525 ft (465 m)
- Length: 29.57 mi (47.59 km)
- Basin size: 117.13 square miles (303.4 km^{2})
- Discharge
  - location: Hiwassee River (in Hiwassee Lake)
  - average: 295.62 cu ft/s (8.371 m^{3}/s) at mouth with Hiawassee River

Basin features
- Progression: Hiwassee River → Tennessee River → Ohio River → Mississippi River → Gulf of Mexico
- River system: Hiwassee River
- Tributaries
  - left: Powder Burnt Branch, Long Branch, Watkins Creek, Beetree Branch, Jenkins Cove, Turnpike Creek, Harris Creek, Puncheon Branch, Worm Creek, Junaluska Creek, Tatham Creek, Town Branch, Whitaker Branch, Brown Creek, Sharp Branch, Taylor Creek, Parker Branch, Laurel Branch, Parsons Branch, Vengeance Creek, Highfall Branch, Sam Branch, Long Branch, Pole Bridge Branch, Sam Newton Branch, Rogers Creek, Sales Branch, Rattler Branch, George Martin Branch, Wesley Martin Branch, Palmer Branch
  - right: Trim Cove, Wright Branch, Nelson Creek, Millseat Branch, Bryson Branch, Brady Branch, Tank Branch, Mill Branch, Melton Creek, Doctor Branch, Tom Thumb Creek, Stillhouse Branch, Flat Branch, Mill Branch, Burnt Shanty Branch, Gipp Creek, Stewart Branch, Pile Creek, Britton Creek, Don Holland Creek, Webb Creek, Ricket Branch, Morris Creek, Welch Mill Creek, Hyatts Creek, Bettis Branch, Magazine Branch, Mason Branch, Stillhouse Branch, Morgan Creek, Mary Branch, Colvard Creek, Hayes Mill Creek, Moose Cove, Stillhouse Branch, Marble Creek, Brittain Branch
- Waterbodies: Hiwassee Lake
- Bridges: Campbell Terrace (x3), Kadie Lane, Woodhaven Lane, Old US 19, US 19 (x2), Nelson Road, Patterson Lane, US 19-US 129 (x3), Driftwood Lane, Gipp Creek Road, Stewart Road, US 19, Robbinsville Road, Cover Avenue, Main Street (US 19 Business), NC 141, US 19 (x4), Casino Parkway, Snap On Road, US 19-US 129, Black and Gold Drive, Bulldog Drive, Valley River Avenue (US 19 Business), Tennessee Street

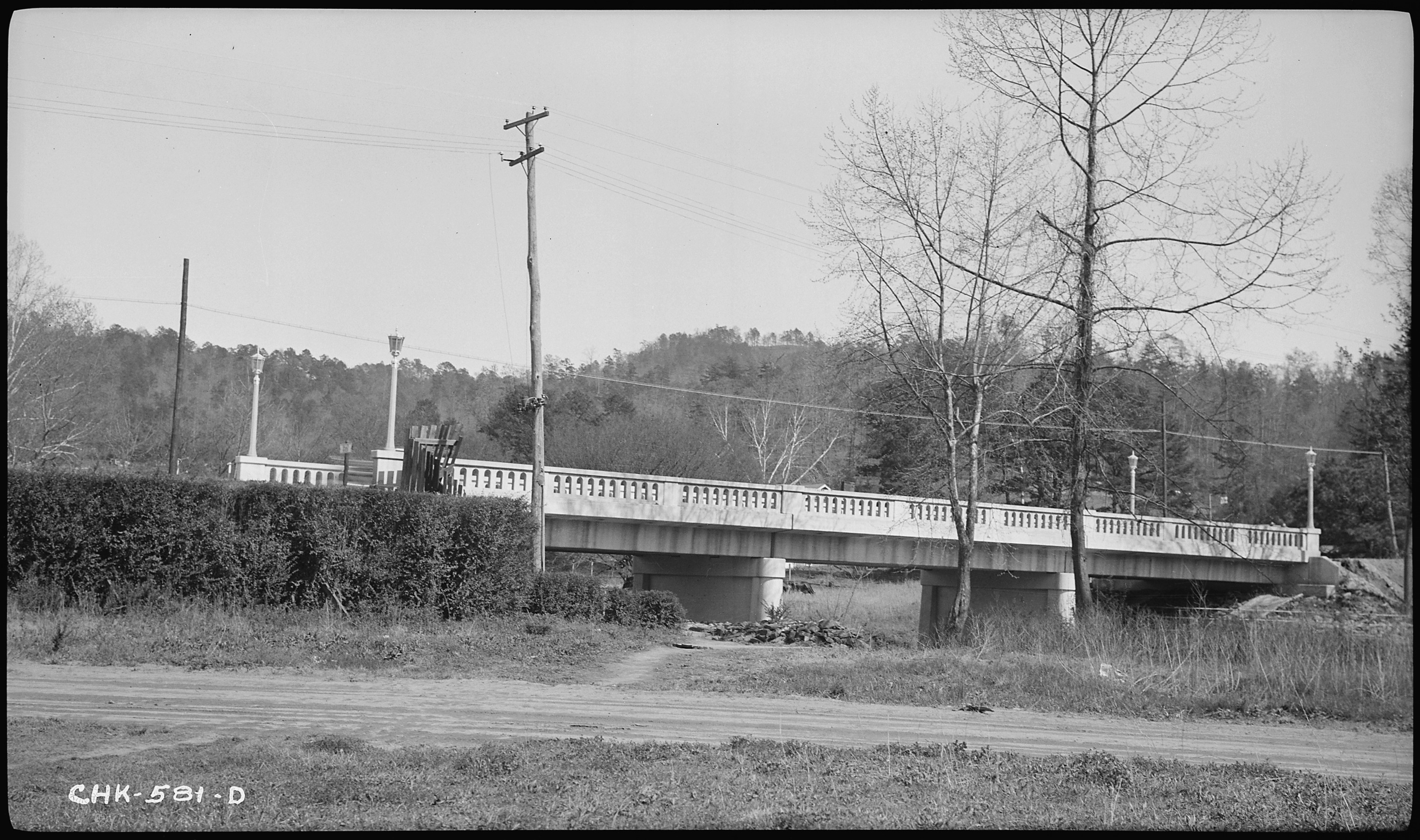
U.S. Route 19 bridge over the Valley River at Murphy, North Carolina in 1937

The Valley River is a tributary of the Hiwassee River. It arises as a pair of springs in the Snowbird Mountains of Cherokee County, North Carolina and descends 2,960 feet (900 m) in elevation in approximately forty miles (64 km) to enter the Hiwassee embayment at present-day Murphy, North Carolina.

The Valley River flows generally southwest. US 19 runs parallel to it between Topton and Murphy, North Carolina, where it crosses the river via a small bridge. The river has a total watershed of 120 m2 (11.15km2)

== Variant names ==
According to the Geographic Names Information System, it has also been known historically as:

- Konchete River

== Geology ==
The Valley River formed in the uplifting of the Appalachian chain during the Paleozoic Era, Devonian Period, in an event known as the Alleghenian orogeny. Earlier in the Paleozoic, the area was the site of shallow seas which resulted in large limestone deposits. The Alleghenian orogeny caused both uplift and the metamorphism of rock at the highest pressure points within the various Appalachian mountain chains. The Snowbird and Unicoi Mountains, which border the Valley River, contain silver, gold, copper, limestone, sandstone, marble, brown iron ore in economically recoverable quantities. During the erosion of the mountains over a 480 million-year period, the Valley River carved a broad, flat valley and deposited rich fertile soil.

Marble, North Carolina is the site of high-quality white, gray, pink and blue marble. It has been known by European Americans since the removal of the Cherokee in 1838–1839. They have quarried here intermittently ever since.

Near Rhodo, North Carolina is Silvermine Creek, said to be the location of a small silver deposit. Silvermine Creek is a tributary of the Valley River. The following account was dated 1849.

"In the counties west of the Blue Ridge, there has been as yet no exploration to any depth beneath the surface of the ground, with perhaps the single exception of the old excavations in the county of Cherokee. According to the most commonly received Indian tradition, they were excavated more than a century ago, by a company of Spaniards from Florida. They are said to have worked there for two or three summers, to have obtained a white metal, and prospered greatly in their mining operations, until the Cherokees, finding that if it became generally known that there were valuable mines in their country, the cupidity of the white men would expel them from it, determined in solemn council to destroy the whole party, and that in obedience to that decree no one of the adventurous strangers was allowed to return to the country whence they came. Though this story accords very well with the Indian laws which condemned to death those who disclosed the existence of mines to white men, yet I do not regard it as entitled too much credit".

Talc has been mined in Cherokee County since at least the 1850s.

At Tomotla, the river has a mean annual discharge of 247 cu ft/s (7.0 m^{3}/s)

== History of settlement ==
=== Indigenous settlement ===
Indigenous peoples have been proven to have settled here between 8000 and 1000 BC. Two miles (3.2 km) east of the terminus of the Valley River lies the Peachtree Mound, an Archaic period earthwork mound. It was excavated in 1933 by the Smithsonian.

Successive indigenous cultures continued to arise here. During the Pisgah phase (1000 to 1500) of the South Appalachian Mississippian culture, the Valley River was known as Gunahita or “Long River”. Later the Cherokee called it Konehetee (or Konnaheeta), meaning Valley River.

Another ancient mound is known as the Andrews Mound; it is located on private property along the Valley River near Andrews, North Carolina. It is believed to have been built in the Qualla Phase (1500 to 1850). The earliest years were during the South Appalachian Mississippian culture period in this region. The Iroquoian-speaking Cherokee people are believed to have reached this area later.

Settlements along the Valley River and the larger Hiwassee River were classified among what English colonists referred to as the Valley Towns. The traders and colonists of South Carolina classified six (6) regions of Cherokee villages in 1700 by geographic groupings, based on their relation to the colonial settlements at the Atlantic coast. The Cherokee towns of Conoske, Tomatly, Little Telliquo and Nayowee were located along the Valley River.

The Cherokee called the confluence of the Valley River at the Hiwassee River Tlanusi’yi, or ‘The Leech Place’. They said that it was the home of a legendary giant leech that ate the ears and noses of Cherokee victims.

=== European settlement ===
Hernando De Soto was the first European to enter the area on May 25 to 30, 1540. De Soto’s march paralleled the Valley River on an old Indian trail (today US 19) from the Cherokee town of Xuala (modern Tryon, NC) to the Cherokee town of Gauxule (modern Asheville, North Carolina). Although no clear record exists, De Soto probably passed near the Cherokee Valley Towns of Conoske, Tomatly, Little Telliquo and Nayowee.

Juan Pardo followed in 1567 traversing the area on the way to building a fort on the Catawba River near Charlotte, North Carolina

The first permanent settlement of Europeans in the area was a Baptist missionary outpost near Peachtree, North Carolina on the Hiwassee River in 1817.

The Valley River saw a succession of administrative and political changes as the counties of western North Carolina were formed and subdivided. In 1753 the Valley River was part of the as yet unsurveyed western end of Anson County, North Carolina. Jacques Nicolas Bellin's Map of Carolina and Georgia of 1757 shows but does not label the Valley River. The Map of Georgia and Carolina by Bellin shows the Valley Towns of Euforsee, Comastee, Little Telliquo, Cotocanahuy, Nayowee, Tomatly, and Chewohe

In 1768 the Valley River became part of Tryon County, North Carolina. In 1779 the Valley River became part of Rutherford County, North Carolina. In 1791 the Valley River became a part of Buncombe County, North Carolina. In 1808 Haywood County, North Carolina, which was to contain the Valley River, was carved from Buncombe County. In 1828, Macon County, North Carolina which was to contain the Valley River was carved from Haywood County. Until 1835, the lands around the Valley River all belonged to the Cherokee.

The 1835 Treaty of Echota ceded the land to the state of North Carolina. Beginning in 1838 at Fort Butler, the Cherokee were marshaled for removal to Oklahoma. The Cherokee were forcibly removed on the order of President Andrew Jackson, despite a ruling in favor of the Cherokee by the US Supreme Court. The march would be known as the Trail of Tears. In 1839, Cherokee County, North Carolina, which now contains the Valley River, was constituted from Haywood County and a land lottery was held, opening the land to permanent European settlement.

The town of Murphy, at the confluence of the Valley and Hiwassee Rivers was founded in 1835. The town of Andrews was founded on the Valley River in 1890 as the railroad moved up the valley. When the towns of Marble, Rhodo and Topton were founded is uncertain; they are the other three communities along the Valley River.

== The Valley River Today ==
The Valley River area remains largely rural and agricultural. The lower reaches are navigable in a canoe but there is little activity on the river beyond fishing. At Murphy, the Konehette (“valley” in Cherokee) Park borders the Valley River, providing a greenway.

The State of North Carolina has identified nine tributaries of the Valley River as having some form of impairment, including the entire Valley River between Gipp Creek and Hiwassee Lake. Most of the impairments are minor and result from runoff from pasture or impervious surfaces.

US 19 traverses the Valley River valley providing panoramic views from the Unicoi to the Snowbird Mountains. Historic sections of Murphy and Andrews have been restored and bring some tourism to the area; there are also a large flea market, and recreational opportunities provided by the Hiwassee Lake.
