= 1892 United States presidential election in North Carolina =

- November 8, 1892

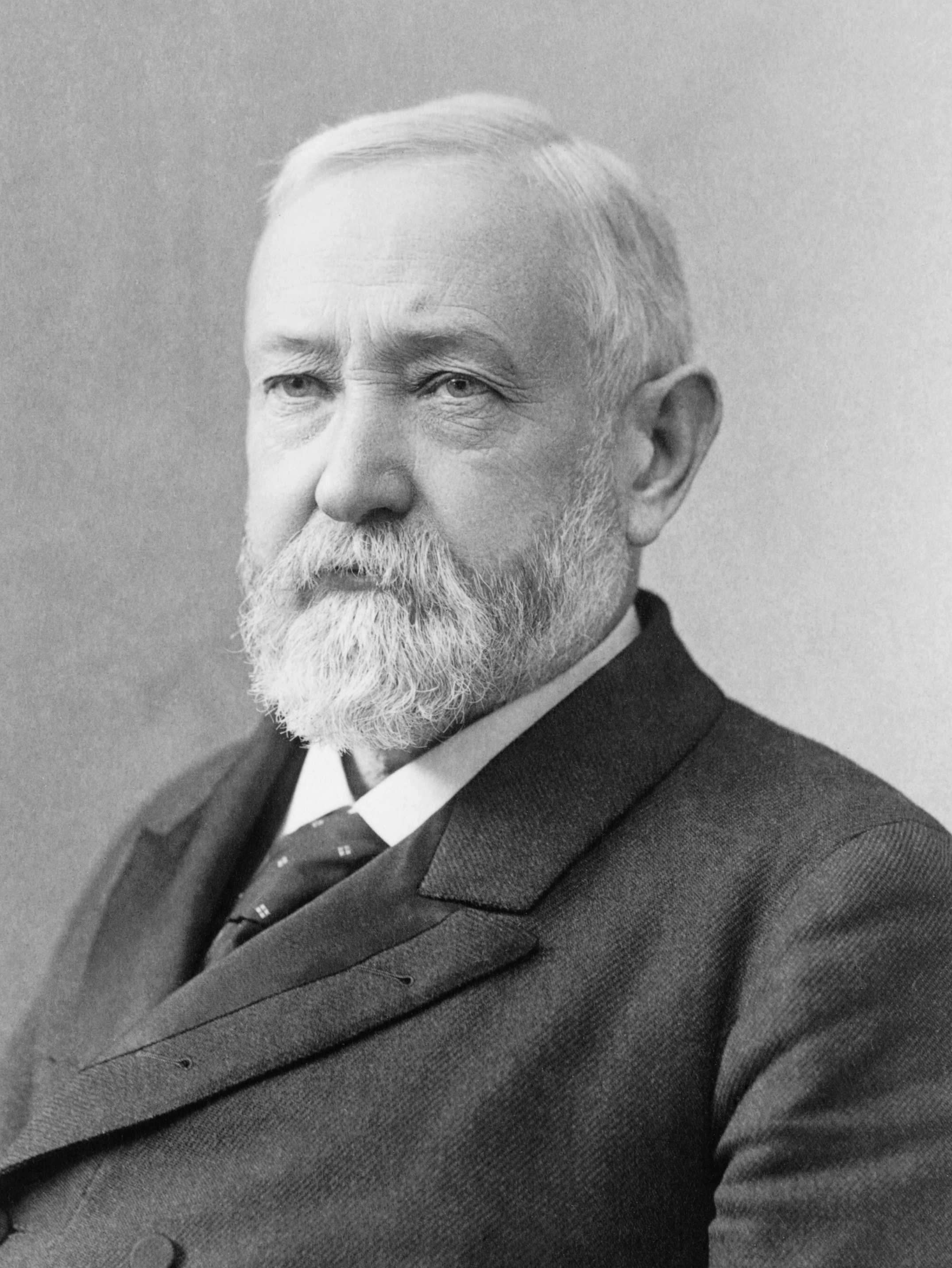

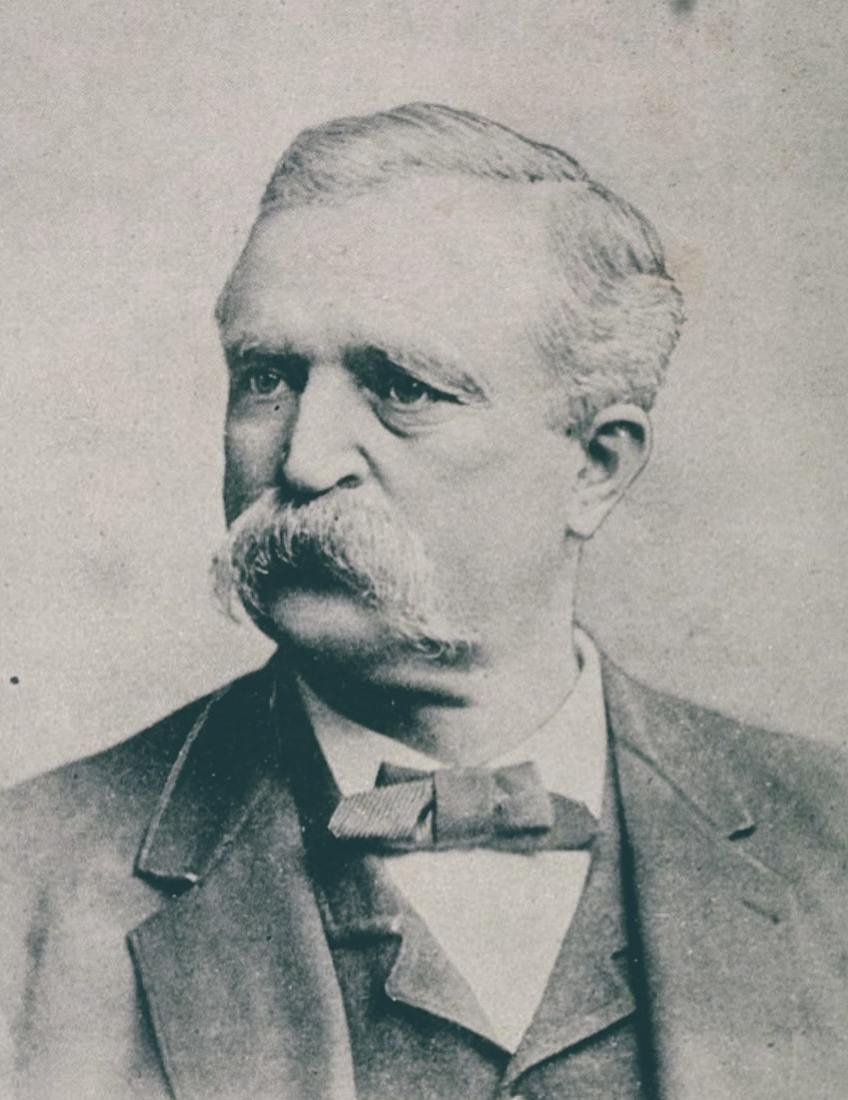
Nominee	Grover Cleveland	Benjamin Harrison	James B. Weaver
Party	Democratic	Republican	Populist
Home state	New York	Indiana	Iowa
Running mate	Adlai Stevenson I	Whitelaw Reid	James G. Field
Electoral vote	11	0	0
Popular vote	132,951	100,346	44,336
Percentage	47.44%	35.80%	15.82%
County results
Cleveland
30–40%
40–50%
50–60%
60–70%
Harrison
30–40%
40–50%
50–60%
60–70%
Weaver
30–40%
40–50%
Tie
<50%
President before election
Benjamin Harrison
Republican
Elected President
Grover Cleveland
Democratic

The 1892 United States presidential election in North Carolina took place on November 8, 1892. All contemporary 44 states were part of the 1892 United States presidential election. North Carolina voters chose 11 electors to the Electoral College, which selected the president and vice president.

North Carolina was won by the Democratic nominees, former President Grover Cleveland of New York and his running mate Adlai Stevenson I of Illinois.

== Results ==
1892 United States presidential election in North Carolina
Party	Candidate	Votes	Percentage	Electoral votes
Democratic	Grover Cleveland	132,951	47.44%	11
Republican	Benjamin Harrison (incumbent)	100,346	35.80%	0
People's	James B. Weaver	44,336	15.82%	0
Prohibition	John Bidwell	2,637	0.94%	0
Totals		280,270	100.00%	11
Voter turnout				—

=== Results by county ===
1892 United States presidential election in North Carolina by county
County	Grover Cleveland Democratic		Benjamin Harrison Republican		James B. Weaver Populist		John Bidwell Prohibition		Margin	
County	%	#	%	#	%	#	%	#	%	#
Stanly	64.76%	1,053	19.86%	323	13.59%	221	1.78%	29	44.90%	730
Anson	65.37%	1,261	20.53%	396	14.10%	272	0.00%	0	44.84%	865
Johnston	65.44%	3,135	21.62%	1,036	12.94%	620	0.00%	0	43.81%	2,099
Wilson	54.60%	2,100	12.92%	497	32.48%	1,249	0.00%	0	22.13% (Note: In this county where Harrison ran third behind Cleveland and Weaver, percentage margin given is Cleveland percentage minus Weaver percentage and vote margin Cleveland vote total minus Weaver vote total.)	851
Onslow	58.25%	1,137	19.42%	379	22.34%	436	0.00%	0	35.91%	701
Union	56.19%	1,798	17.88%	572	25.81%	826	0.13%	4	30.38%	972
Alleghany	69.00%	797	31.00%	358	0.00%	0	0.00%	0	38.01%	439
Rowan	57.42%	2,303	21.84%	876	19.80%	794	0.95%	38	35.58%	1,427
Halifax	62.76%	3,079	28.05%	1,376	9.19%	451	0.00%	0	34.71%	1,703
Currituck	61.69%	834	29.73%	402	8.43%	114	0.15%	2	31.95%	432
Cleveland	51.34%	1,788	20.73%	722	27.56%	960	0.37%	13	23.77%	828
Mecklenburg	59.97%	3,881	29.87%	1,933	8.25%	534	1.92%	124	30.10%	1,948
Catawba	50.59%	1,711	20.85%	705	26.40%	893	2.16%	73	24.19%	818
Carteret	59.48%	1,211	30.11%	613	10.41%	212	0.00%	0	29.37%	598
Robeson	54.13%	2,312	26.15%	1,117	19.71%	842	0.00%	0	27.98%	1,195
Jones	51.22%	670	23.47%	307	25.31%	331	0.00%	0	25.92%	339
Caldwell	55.34%	1,172	28.99%	614	13.83%	293	1.84%	39	26.35%	558
Hyde	52.41%	858	26.27%	430	21.32%	349	0.00%	0	26.15%	428
Columbus	52.37%	1,592	26.74%	813	20.89%	635	0.00%	0	25.63%	779
Cabarrus	47.97%	1,419	22.95%	679	27.69%	819	1.39%	41	20.28%	600
Greene	55.18%	1,006	30.83%	562	13.99%	255	0.00%	0	24.36%	444
New Hanover	61.02%	2,408	38.01%	1,500	0.96%	38	0.00%	0	23.01%	908
Jackson	56.31%	977	33.31%	578	9.86%	171	0.52%	9	23.00%	399
Harnett	48.63%	1,222	25.87%	650	25.27%	635	0.24%	6	22.76%	572
Edgecombe	51.56%	1,702	29.87%	986	18.57%	613	0.00%	0	21.69%	716
Haywood	58.30%	1,525	36.66%	959	1.91%	50	3.13%	82	21.64%	566
Wake	43.07%	3,724	22.98%	1,987	32.60%	2,819	1.34%	116	10.47%	905
Gates	50.43%	942	30.78%	575	18.79%	351	0.00%	0	19.65%	367
Chatham	35.61%	1,567	16.52%	727	46.24%	2,035	1.64%	72	-10.63%	-468
Nash	35.53%	997	16.96%	476	47.47%	1,332	0.04%	1	-11.94%	-335
Franklin	42.31%	1,741	24.13%	993	33.56%	1,381	0.00%	0	8.75%	360
Macon	51.40%	862	33.51%	562	14.07%	236	1.01%	17	17.89%	300
Pitt	43.68%	2,052	25.99%	1,221	29.67%	1,394	0.66%	31	14.01%	658
McDowell	56.66%	1,055	39.04%	727	3.92%	73	0.38%	7	17.62%	328
Clay	53.12%	383	35.51%	256	11.10%	80	0.28%	2	17.61%	127
Richmond	51.75%	1,700	34.16%	1,122	14.00%	460	0.09%	3	17.60%	578
Lincoln	47.59%	976	30.08%	617	21.65%	444	0.68%	14	17.50%	359
Cumberland	44.39%	2,178	27.17%	1,333	27.78%	1,363	0.65%	32	16.61%	815
Iredell	50.78%	2,282	33.91%	1,524	13.66%	614	1.65%	74	16.87%	758
Brunswick	40.03%	755	23.65%	446	36.32%	685	0.00%	0	3.71%	70
Yancey	53.86%	927	37.83%	651	8.31%	143	0.00%	0	16.04%	276
Lenoir	49.57%	1,388	34.18%	957	16.00%	448	0.25%	7	15.39%	431
Duplin	44.29%	1,455	30.02%	986	25.54%	839	0.15%	5	14.28%	469
Gaston	50.39%	1,616	36.58%	1,173	11.85%	380	1.18%	38	13.81%	443
Wayne	47.15%	2,261	34.31%	1,645	17.85%	856	0.69%	33	12.85%	616
Martin	51.40%	1,454	38.56%	1,091	9.93%	281	0.11%	3	12.83%	363
Graham	56.41%	339	43.59%	262	0.00%	0	0.00%	0	12.81%	77
Swain	46.04%	558	33.25%	403	17.90%	217	2.81%	34	12.79%	155
Alexander	41.44%	591	29.45%	420	27.07%	386	2.03%	29	11.99%	171
Burke	51.12%	1,410	39.81%	1,098	8.41%	232	0.65%	18	11.31%	312
Alamance	49.01%	1,691	37.71%	1,301	9.77%	337	3.51%	121	11.30%	390
Rutherford	51.14%	1,794	41.39%	1,452	7.18%	252	0.29%	10	9.75%	342
Bertie	48.74%	1,610	39.63%	1,309	11.63%	384	0.00%	0	9.11%	301
Montgomery	48.70%	1,011	40.41%	839	10.21%	212	0.67%	14	8.29%	172
Forsyth	49.59%	2,880	42.13%	2,447	8.08%	469	0.21%	12	7.46%	433
Beaufort	52.37%	1,865	45.27%	1,612	0.00%	0	2.36%	84	7.10%	253
Buncombe	50.73%	3,588	44.18%	3,125	0.41%	29	4.68%	331	6.55%	463
Durham	42.35%	1,490	35.93%	1,264	18.96%	667	2.76%	97	6.42%	226
Orange	39.47%	1,117	33.07%	936	27.21%	770	0.25%	7	6.40%	181
Surry	52.04%	1,974	45.87%	1,740	1.66%	63	0.42%	16	6.17%	234
Moore	43.17%	1,674	37.65%	1,460	18.72%	726	0.46%	18	5.52%	214
Watauga	49.89%	940	44.53%	839	5.25%	99	0.32%	6	5.36%	101
Guilford	46.38%	2,773	42.35%	2,532	6.94%	415	4.33%	259	4.03%	241
Randolph	43.12%	2,077	39.09%	1,883	11.46%	552	6.33%	305	4.03%	194
Pamlico	38.30%	509	35.44%	471	26.11%	347	0.15%	2	2.86%	38
Davidson	45.10%	1,928	42.97%	1,837	9.99%	427	1.94%	83	2.13%	91
Northampton	43.02%	1,365	41.16%	1,306	14.40%	457	1.42%	45	1.86%	59
Transylvania	49.57%	513	48.50%	502	1.93%	20	0.00%	0	1.06%	11
Bladen	44.59%	1,228	43.75%	1,205	11.66%	321	0.00%	0	0.84%	23
Cherokee	47.72%	692	47.72%	692	3.59%	52	0.97%	14	0.00%	0
Sampson	30.43%	1,299	31.04%	1,325	37.92%	1,619	0.61%	26	-6.89% (Note: In this county where Cleveland ran third behind both Harrison and Weaver, percentage margin given is Harrison percentage minus Weaver percentage and vote margin Harrison vote total minus Weaver vote total.)	-294
Camden	44.03%	483	45.94%	504	9.94%	109	0.09%	1	-1.91%	-21
Dare	48.48%	335	51.52%	356	0.00%	0	0.00%	0	-3.04%	-21
Ashe	46.15%	1,366	49.32%	1,460	4.53%	134	0.00%	0	-3.18%	-94
Wilkes	46.46%	1,770	49.74%	1,895	3.33%	127	0.47%	18	-3.28%	-125
Rockingham	38.72%	1,784	42.57%	1,961	18.52%	853	0.20%	9	-3.84%	-177
Pender	44.29%	872	48.76%	960	6.96%	137	0.00%	0	-4.47%	-88
Person	42.02%	1,261	46.65%	1,400	11.16%	335	0.17%	5	-4.63%	-139
Polk	47.45%	511	52.55%	566	0.00%	0	0.00%	0	-5.11%	-55
Granville	39.76%	1,403	46.19%	1,630	13.88%	490	0.17%	6	-6.43%	-227
Tyrrell	30.83%	242	37.58%	295	31.59%	248	0.00%	0	5.99%	47
Yadkin	42.16%	1,046	49.13%	1,219	6.65%	165	2.06%	51	-6.97%	-173
Hertford	41.86%	710	49.71%	843	8.20%	139	0.24%	4	-7.84%	-133
Craven	39.98%	1,305	50.49%	1,648	9.47%	309	0.06%	2	-10.51%	-343
Washington	35.25%	533	45.77%	692	18.72%	283	0.26%	4	-10.52%	-159
Chowan	41.38%	679	53.75%	882	4.88%	80	0.00%	0	-12.37%	-203
Stokes	39.93%	1,217	52.82%	1,610	7.05%	215	0.20%	6	-12.89%	-393
Vance	29.65%	908	43.76%	1,340	26.16%	801	0.42%	13	-14.11%	-432
Davie	35.31%	725	51.49%	1,057	12.32%	253	0.88%	18	-16.17%	-332
Henderson	39.07%	835	56.01%	1,197	3.84%	82	1.08%	23	-16.94%	-362
Pasquotank	35.44%	801	54.16%	1,224	9.91%	224	0.49%	11	-18.72%	-423
Madison	37.78%	1,118	58.06%	1,718	3.99%	118	0.17%	5	-20.28%	-600
Caswell	31.57%	913	52.63%	1,522	15.66%	453	0.14%	4	-21.06%	-609
Perquimans	30.53%	490	51.96%	834	17.45%	280	0.06%	1	-21.43%	-344
Warren	23.99%	737	47.98%	1,474	28.03%	861	0.00%	0	19.95%	613
Mitchell	34.49%	724	63.22%	1,327	1.81%	38	0.48%	10	-28.73%	-603

== See also ==
- United States presidential elections in North Carolina
