= 1880 United States presidential election in North Carolina =

- November 2, 1880
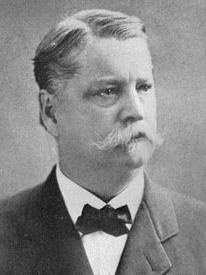

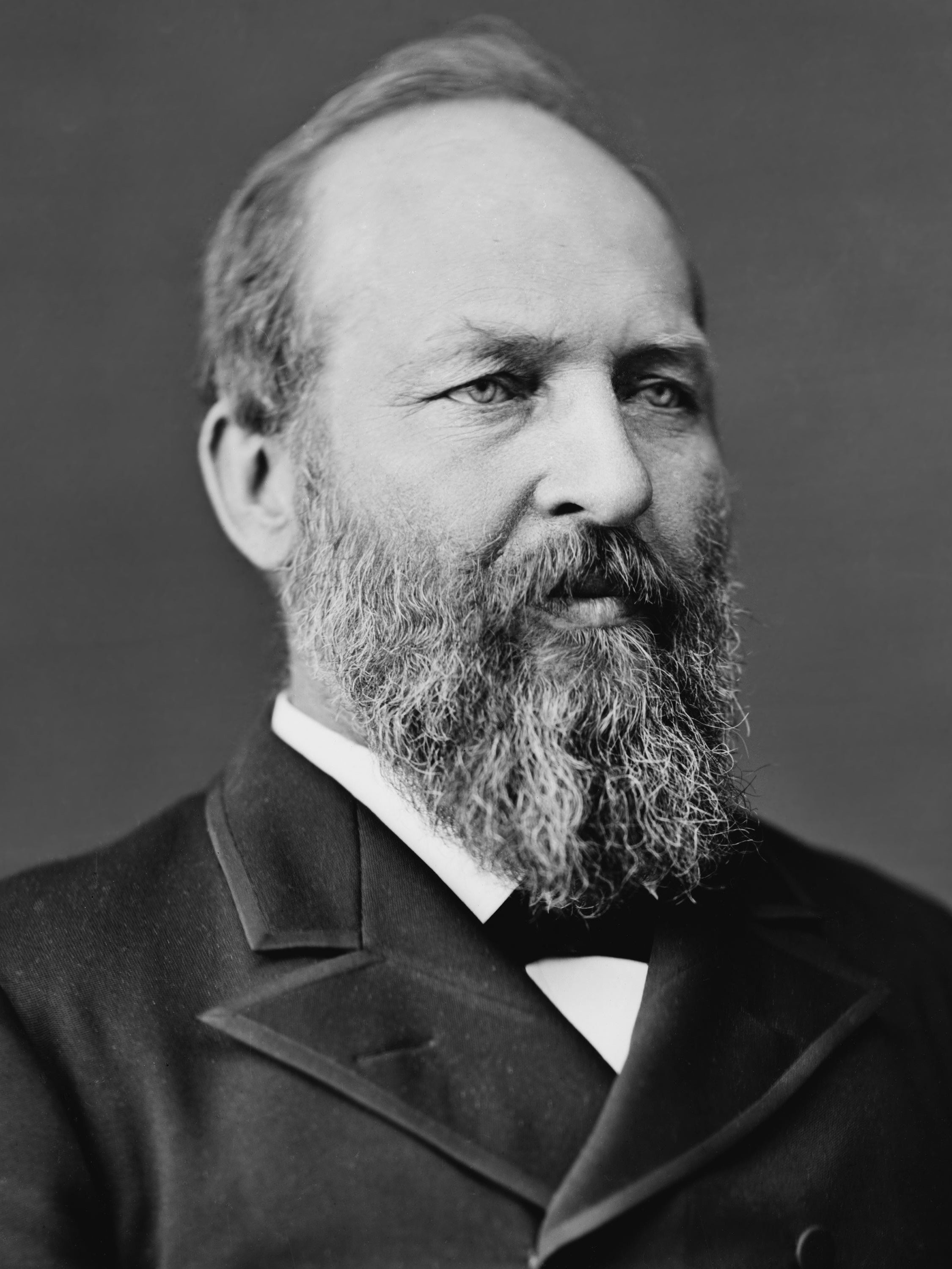
| Nominee | Winfield Scott Hancock | James A. Garfield |
| Party | Democratic | Republican |
| Home state | Pennsylvania | Ohio |
| Running mate | William Hayden English | Chester A. Arthur |
| Electoral vote | 10 | 0 |
| Popular vote | 124,204 | 115,616 |
| Percentage | 51.55% | 47.98% |
County results
Hancock
50–60%
60–70%
70–80%
Garfield
40–50%
50–60%
60–70%
President before election
Rutherford B. Hayes
Republican
Elected President
James A. Garfield
Republican

The 1880 United States presidential election in North Carolina took place on November 2, 1880, as part of the 1880 United States presidential election. Voters chose ten representatives, or electors to the Electoral College, who voted for president and vice president.

North Carolina voted for the Democratic candidates, Major General Winfield Scott Hancock and his running mate William Hayden English, over the Republican candidates, U.S. Representative James A. Garfield and his running mate Chester A. Arthur. Hancock won North Carolina narrowly by a margin of 3.57 percent.

== Results ==
| Presidential Candidate | Running Mate | Party | Electoral Vote (EV) | Popular Vote (PV) | |
|---|---|---|---|---|---|
| Winfield Scott Hancock of Pennsylvania | William Hayden English | Democratic | 10 | 124,204 | 51.55% |
| James A. Garfield | Chester A. Arthur | Republican | 0 | 115,616 | 47.98% |
| James B. Weaver | Barzillai J. Chambers | Greenback | 0 | 1,126 | 0.47% |

=== Results by county ===
1880 United States presidential election in North Carolina by county
| County | Winfield Scott Hancock Democratic | | James Abram Garfield Republican | | James Baird Weaver Greenback | | Margin | |
| County | % | # | % | # | % | # | % | # |
|---|---|---|---|---|---|---|---|---|
| Swain | 75.31% | 308 | 24.69% | 101 | 0.00% | 0 | 50.61% | 207 |
| Cleveland | 73.00% | 1,736 | 22.50% | 535 | 4.50% | 107 | 50.50% | 1,201 |
| Catawba | 75.11% | 1,883 | 24.89% | 624 | 0.00% | 0 | 50.22% | 1,259 |
| Currituck | 72.80% | 974 | 27.20% | 364 | 0.00% | 0 | 45.59% | 610 |
| Jackson | 72.17% | 677 | 27.83% | 261 | 0.00% | 0 | 44.35% | 416 |
| Alexander | 69.24% | 824 | 30.76% | 366 | 0.00% | 0 | 38.49% | 458 |
| Macon | 69.01% | 746 | 30.99% | 335 | 0.00% | 0 | 38.02% | 411 |
| Caldwell | 68.18% | 988 | 30.50% | 442 | 1.31% | 19 | 37.68% | 546 |
| Alleghany | 67.95% | 549 | 32.05% | 259 | 0.00% | 0 | 35.89% | 290 |
| Onslow | 66.89% | 1,085 | 33.11% | 537 | 0.00% | 0 | 33.79% | 548 |
| Clay | 66.12% | 365 | 33.88% | 187 | 0.00% | 0 | 32.25% | 178 |
| Gates | 65.88% | 1,010 | 34.12% | 523 | 0.00% | 0 | 31.77% | 487 |
| Union | 64.79% | 1,516 | 35.21% | 824 | 0.00% | 0 | 29.57% | 692 |
| Haywood | 64.77% | 932 | 35.23% | 507 | 0.00% | 0 | 29.53% | 425 |
| Columbus | 63.40% | 1,597 | 36.60% | 922 | 0.00% | 0 | 26.80% | 675 |
| Duplin | 61.96% | 2,015 | 37.76% | 1,228 | 0.28% | 9 | 24.20% | 787 |
| Transylvania | 61.88% | 461 | 38.12% | 284 | 0.00% | 0 | 23.76% | 177 |
| Yancey | 61.65% | 712 | 38.35% | 443 | 0.00% | 0 | 23.29% | 269 |
| Anson | 61.55% | 1,617 | 38.45% | 1,010 | 0.00% | 0 | 23.11% | 607 |
| Rockingham | 60.48% | 2,403 | 38.74% | 1,539 | 0.78% | 31 | 21.75% | 864 |
| Pamlico | 57.17% | 582 | 35.56% | 362 | 7.27% | 74 | 21.61% | 220 |
| Stanly | 60.67% | 887 | 39.33% | 575 | 0.00% | 0 | 21.34% | 312 |
| Iredell | 59.65% | 2,389 | 40.35% | 1,616 | 0.00% | 0 | 19.30% | 773 |
| Rowan | 59.64% | 2,035 | 40.36% | 1,377 | 0.00% | 0 | 19.28% | 658 |
| McDowell | 59.55% | 817 | 40.45% | 555 | 0.00% | 0 | 19.10% | 262 |
| Carteret | 59.38% | 1,026 | 40.57% | 701 | 0.06% | 1 | 18.81% | 325 |
| Harnett | 59.35% | 1,028 | 40.65% | 704 | 0.00% | 0 | 18.71% | 324 |
| Burke | 58.75% | 1,125 | 41.25% | 790 | 0.00% | 0 | 17.49% | 335 |
| Cabarrus | 58.60% | 1,499 | 41.20% | 1,054 | 0.20% | 5 | 17.40% | 445 |
| Hyde | 57.35% | 819 | 42.65% | 609 | 0.00% | 0 | 14.71% | 210 |
| Surry | 57.17% | 1,412 | 42.83% | 1,058 | 0.00% | 0 | 14.33% | 354 |
| Orange | 57.15% | 2,537 | 42.85% | 1,902 | 0.00% | 0 | 14.31% | 635 |
| Watauga | 56.64% | 712 | 43.36% | 545 | 0.00% | 0 | 13.29% | 167 |
| Sampson | 56.45% | 2,122 | 43.26% | 1,626 | 0.29% | 11 | 13.19% | 496 |
| Johnston | 55.80% | 2,059 | 44.20% | 1,631 | 0.00% | 0 | 11.60% | 428 |
| Buncombe | 55.63% | 1,995 | 44.37% | 1,591 | 0.00% | 0 | 11.27% | 404 |
| Stokes | 55.07% | 1,244 | 44.40% | 1,003 | 0.53% | 12 | 10.67% | 241 |
| Camden | 55.06% | 642 | 44.94% | 524 | 0.00% | 0 | 10.12% | 118 |
| Tyrrell | 54.96% | 432 | 45.04% | 354 | 0.00% | 0 | 9.92% | 78 |
| Pitt | 53.78% | 2,200 | 44.37% | 1,815 | 1.86% | 76 | 9.41% | 385 |
| Wilson | 54.70% | 1,652 | 45.30% | 1,368 | 0.00% | 0 | 9.40% | 284 |
| Person | 54.48% | 1,344 | 45.52% | 1,123 | 0.00% | 0 | 8.96% | 221 |
| Chatham | 53.94% | 2,206 | 46.06% | 1,884 | 0.00% | 0 | 7.87% | 322 |
| Alamance | 53.32% | 1,463 | 45.44% | 1,247 | 1.24% | 34 | 7.87% | 216 |
| Lincoln | 53.74% | 913 | 46.26% | 786 | 0.00% | 0 | 7.47% | 127 |
| Nash | 53.41% | 1,612 | 46.59% | 1,406 | 0.00% | 0 | 6.83% | 206 |
| Robeson | 53.28% | 2,235 | 46.72% | 1,960 | 0.00% | 0 | 6.56% | 275 |
| Cherokee | 52.66% | 722 | 47.34% | 649 | 0.00% | 0 | 5.32% | 73 |
| Randolph | 52.54% | 2,005 | 47.46% | 1,811 | 0.00% | 0 | 5.08% | 194 |
| Davie | 52.28% | 975 | 47.72% | 890 | 0.00% | 0 | 4.56% | 85 |
| Martin | 52.24% | 1,408 | 47.76% | 1,287 | 0.00% | 0 | 4.49% | 121 |
| Moore | 51.86% | 1,476 | 48.03% | 1,367 | 0.11% | 3 | 3.83% | 109 |
| Wayne | 51.81% | 2,427 | 48.19% | 2,257 | 0.00% | 0 | 3.63% | 170 |
| Dare | 51.25% | 288 | 48.75% | 274 | 0.00% | 0 | 2.49% | 14 |
| Ashe | 51.10% | 1,117 | 48.90% | 1,069 | 0.00% | 0 | 2.20% | 48 |
| Mecklenburg | 50.88% | 3,361 | 49.12% | 3,245 | 0.00% | 0 | 1.76% | 116 |
| Beaufort | 50.62% | 1,766 | 49.38% | 1,723 | 0.00% | 0 | 1.23% | 43 |
| Rutherford | 50.59% | 1,236 | 49.41% | 1,207 | 0.00% | 0 | 1.19% | 29 |
| Guilford | 50.28% | 2,280 | 49.24% | 2,233 | 0.49% | 22 | 1.04% | 47 |
| Franklin | 50.25% | 2,032 | 49.75% | 2,012 | 0.00% | 0 | 0.49% | 20 |
| Forsyth | 49.06% | 1,778 | 49.42% | 1,791 | 1.52% | 55 | -0.36% | -13 |
| Cumberland | 49.67% | 2,109 | 50.33% | 2,137 | 0.00% | 0 | -0.66% | -28 |
| Gaston | 49.27% | 1,107 | 50.69% | 1,139 | 0.04% | 1 | -1.42% | -32 |
| Davidson | 48.73% | 1,781 | 51.00% | 1,864 | 0.27% | 10 | -2.27% | -83 |
| Wilkes | 48.82% | 1,510 | 51.18% | 1,583 | 0.00% | 0 | -2.36% | -73 |
| Wake | 48.54% | 4,359 | 51.46% | 4,622 | 0.00% | 0 | -2.93% | -263 |
| Greene | 48.27% | 880 | 51.73% | 943 | 0.00% | 0 | -3.46% | -63 |
| Granville | 47.09% | 2,828 | 52.91% | 3,178 | 0.00% | 0 | -5.83% | -350 |
| Hertford | 46.30% | 983 | 53.70% | 1,140 | 0.00% | 0 | -7.40% | -157 |
| Madison | 45.83% | 951 | 54.17% | 1,124 | 0.00% | 0 | -8.34% | -173 |
| Brunswick | 44.75% | 746 | 53.33% | 889 | 1.92% | 32 | -8.58% | -143 |
| Lenoir | 45.55% | 1,132 | 54.45% | 1,353 | 0.00% | 0 | -8.89% | -221 |
| Montgomery | 45.48% | 719 | 54.52% | 862 | 0.00% | 0 | -9.04% | -143 |
| Bladen | 45.14% | 1,278 | 54.29% | 1,537 | 0.57% | 16 | -9.15% | -259 |
| Pender | 41.87% | 1,007 | 51.31% | 1,234 | 6.82% | 164 | -9.44% | -227 |
| Caswell | 44.87% | 1,457 | 55.04% | 1,787 | 0.09% | 3 | -10.16% | -330 |
| Yadkin | 44.83% | 941 | 55.17% | 1,158 | 0.00% | 0 | -10.34% | -217 |
| Henderson | 44.64% | 674 | 55.36% | 836 | 0.00% | 0 | -10.73% | -162 |
| Polk | 44.37% | 335 | 55.63% | 420 | 0.00% | 0 | -11.26% | -85 |
| Richmond | 43.88% | 1,363 | 56.12% | 1,743 | 0.00% | 0 | -12.23% | -380 |
| Perquimans | 43.31% | 758 | 56.69% | 992 | 0.00% | 0 | -13.37% | -234 |
| Chowan | 42.51% | 630 | 57.49% | 852 | 0.00% | 0 | -14.98% | -222 |
| Northampton | 42.07% | 1,514 | 57.93% | 2,085 | 0.00% | 0 | -15.87% | -571 |
| Jones | 41.50% | 574 | 57.85% | 800 | 0.65% | 9 | -16.34% | -226 |
| Halifax | 41.32% | 1,744 | 58.68% | 2,477 | 0.00% | 0 | -17.37% | -733 |
| New Hanover | 36.53% | 1,438 | 55.88% | 2,200 | 7.59% | 299 | -19.35% | -762 |
| Bertie | 39.61% | 1,169 | 60.39% | 1,782 | 0.00% | 0 | -20.77% | -613 |
| Washington | 36.82% | 602 | 60.06% | 982 | 3.12% | 51 | -23.24% | -380 |
| Pasquotank | 35.19% | 575 | 64.81% | 1,059 | 0.00% | 0 | -29.62% | -484 |
| Mitchell | 34.24% | 514 | 65.76% | 987 | 0.00% | 0 | -31.51% | -473 |
| Warren | 33.75% | 1,366 | 66.25% | 2,681 | 0.00% | 0 | -32.49% | -1,315 |
| Edgecombe | 33.19% | 1,726 | 66.81% | 3,475 | 0.00% | 0 | -33.63% | -1,749 |
| Craven | 28.99% | 1,180 | 69.00% | 2,809 | 2.01% | 82 | -40.01% | -1,629 |

== See also ==
- United States presidential elections in North Carolina
