= Friendship, Cherokee County, North Carolina =

Unincorporated community in North Carolina, US

Coordinates: 35°04′31″N 84°11′32″W

Friendship is an unincorporated community in Cherokee County, North Carolina.

== History ==
A former variant name was "Suit". The local Suit family were the namesakes. A post office called Suit was established in 1886, and remained in operation until 1955.
