= Grape Creek, North Carolina =

Unincorporated community in North Carolina, U.S.

Coordinates: 35°06′57″N 84°05′13″W

Grape Creek is an unincorporated community in Cherokee County, in the U.S. state of North Carolina.

== History ==
A post office called Grape Creek was established in 1859, and remained in operation until 1914. The community took its name from a nearby stream of the same name.
