= Texana, North Carolina =

Unincorporated community in North Carolina, United States

Coordinates: 35°06′08″N 84°02′17″W

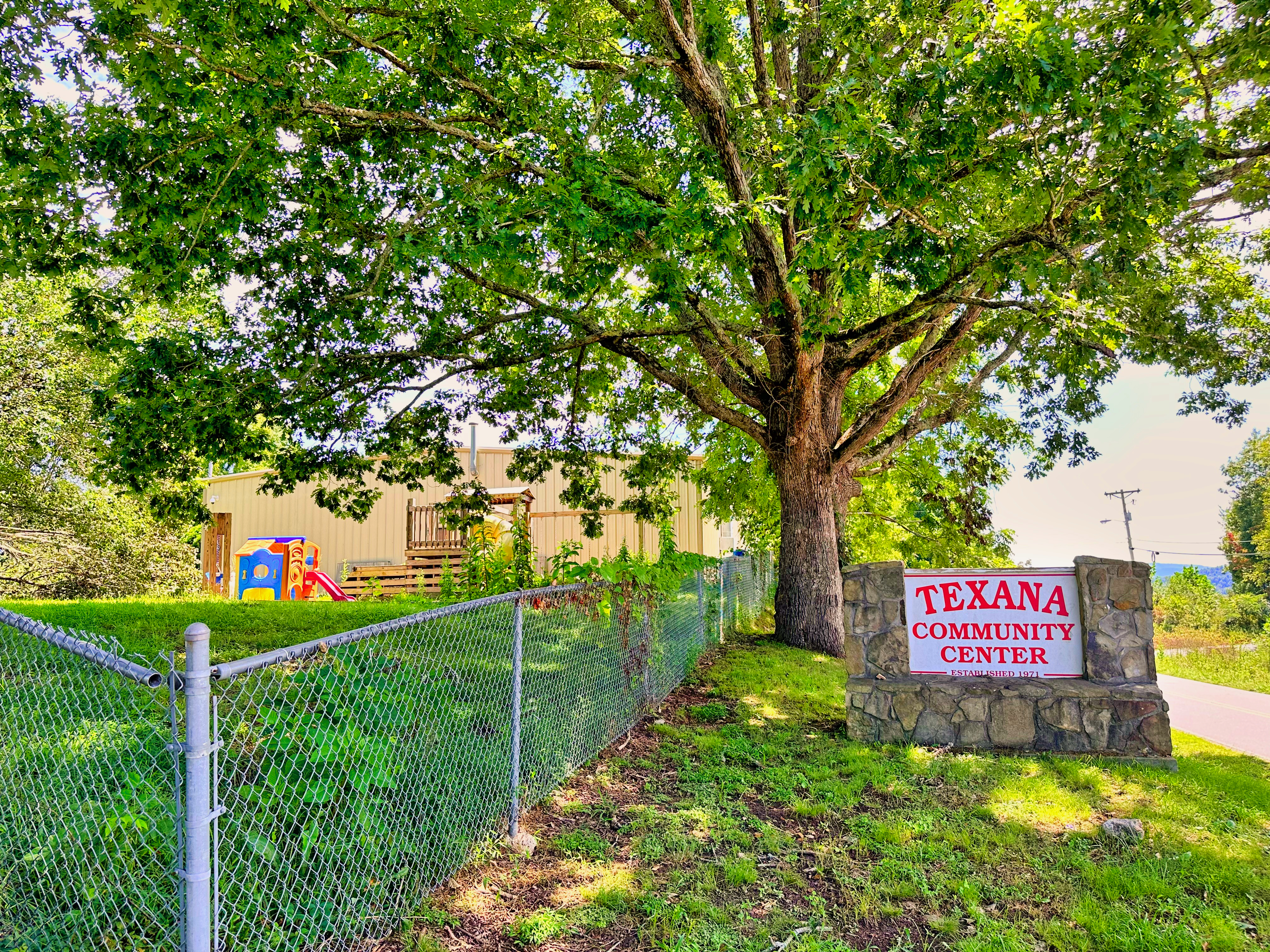
The Texana Community Center in Cherokee County, N.C.

Texana is an unincorporated community in Cherokee County, in the U.S. state of North Carolina. The community receives water and sewer service from the nearby town of Murphy. As of 2012, Texana's population is 353. In 2025, the Cherokee Scout reported that Texana residents have long sought construction of a sidewalk in their community to no avail.

== History ==
Texana was founded around 1850 by Texana “Texas” McClelland, and named for her. New residents quickly built the First Baptist Church in Texana. The church was made of logs hewn by women who had moved to the community. The church building was demolished in 1881 and Mt. Zion Baptist Church was constructed. Mt. Zion remains the community's central church.

Texana's community center was constructed in 1980. It has hosted Cherokee County's annual Martin Luther King Jr. Prayer Breakfast since 1992. The center also hosts an annual Juneteenth Celebration. The Texana community was struck by an EF-2 tornado in March 2012.

== Notable people ==
- Carl Pickens, former NFL wide receiver and 2x Pro Bowl selection, was raised in Texana
