= Hothouse, North Carolina =

Unincorporated community in North Carolina, United States

Coordinates: 35°01′15″N 84°13′57″W

Hothouse is an unincorporated community in Cherokee County, in the U.S. state of North Carolina.

== History ==
A post office called Hothouse was established in 1877 and remained in operation until 1907. The area was named for its numerous former Cherokee sweat lodges. The Hothouse Community Center was built in 1976.
