= 1884 United States presidential election in North Carolina =

- November 4, 1884
- Turnout: 19.16% of the total population ▲1.95 pp

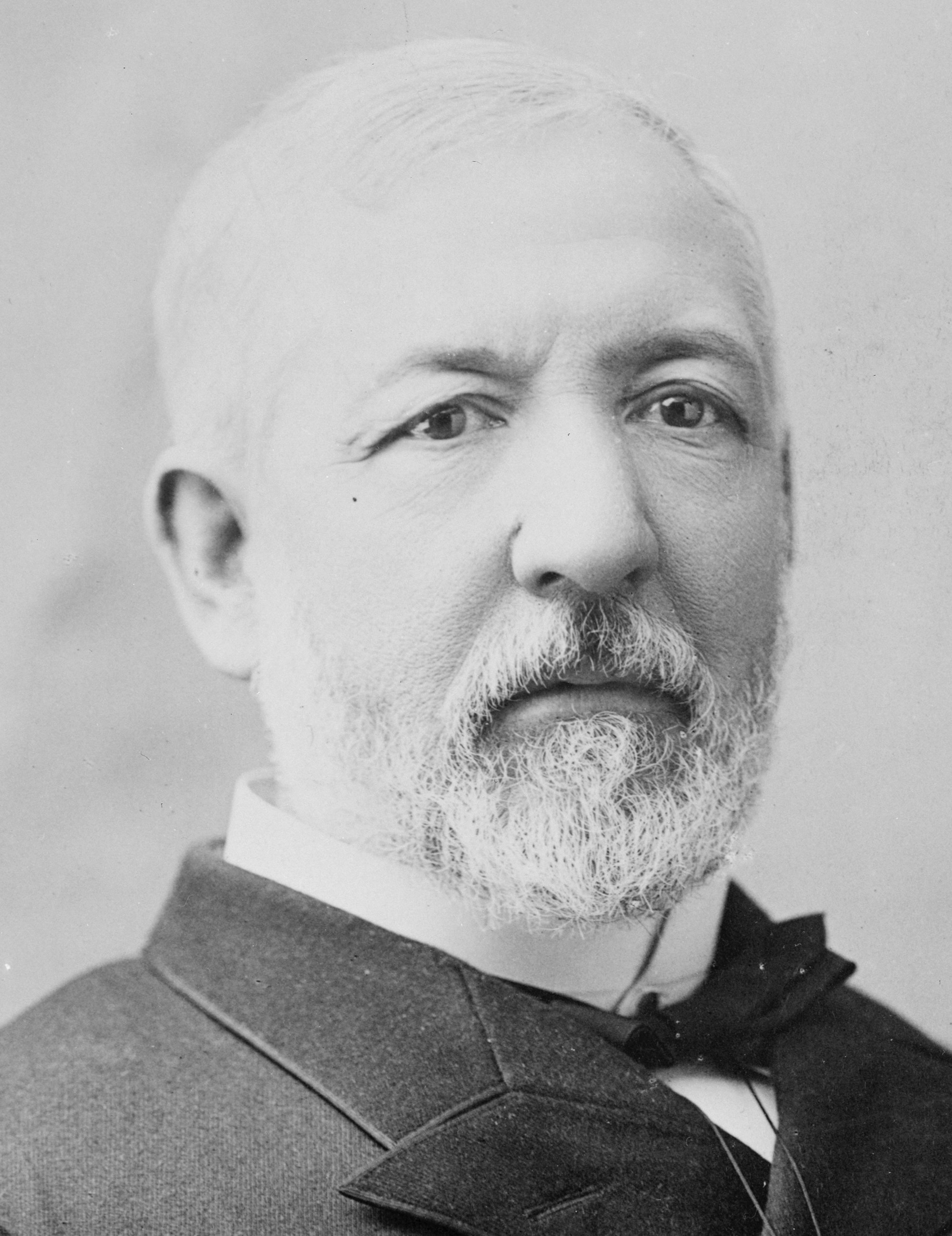
Nominee	Grover Cleveland	James G. Blaine
Party	Democratic	Republican
Home state	New York	Maine
Running mate	Thomas A. Hendricks	John A. Logan
Electoral vote	11	0
Popular vote	142,905	125,021
Percentage	53.25%	46.59%
County results
Cleveland
40–50%
50–60%
60–70%
70–80%
Blaine
50–60%
60–70%
President before election
Chester A. Arthur
Republican
Elected President
Grover Cleveland
Democratic

The 1884 United States presidential election in North Carolina took place on November 6, 1884, as part of the 1884 United States presidential election. State voters chose 11 representatives, or electors, to the Electoral College, who voted for president and vice president.

North Carolina was won by Grover Cleveland, the 28th governor of New York, (D–New York), running with the former governor of Indiana Thomas A. Hendricks, with 53.25 percent of the popular vote, against Secretary of State James G. Blaine (R-Maine), running with Senator John A. Logan, with 46.59 percent of the popular vote.

== Results ==
1884 United States presidential election in North Carolina
Party	Candidate	Running mate	Popular vote		Electoral vote	
Party	Candidate	Running mate	Count	%	Count	%
Democratic	Grover Cleveland of New York	Thomas A. Hendricks of Indiana	142,905	53.25%	11	100.00%
Republican	James G. Blaine of Maine	John A. Logan of Illinois	125,021	46.59%	0	0.00%
Prohibition	John St. John of Kansas	William Daniel of Maryland	430	0.16%	0	0.00%

=== Results by county ===
1884 United States presidential election in North Carolina by county
County	Grover Cleveland Democratic		James G. Blaine Republican		John St. John Prohibition		Margin	
County	%	#	%	#	%	#	%	#
Catawba	77.70%	2,307	22.30%	662	0.00%	0	55.41%	1,645
Cleveland	76.51%	2,042	23.08%	616	0.41%	11	53.43%	1,426
Caldwell	74.69%	1,257	25.31%	426	0.00%	0	49.38%	831
Union	74.65%	1,846	25.35%	627	0.00%	0	49.29%	1,219
Swain	74.23%	481	25.77%	167	0.00%	0	48.46%	314
Alexander	72.32%	938	27.68%	359	0.00%	0	44.64%	579
Onslow	71.94%	1,292	28.06%	504	0.00%	0	43.88%	788
Currituck	69.82%	983	30.18%	425	0.00%	0	39.63%	558
Jackson	66.24%	722	33.30%	363	0.46%	5	32.94%	359
Columbus	66.32%	1,867	33.68%	948	0.00%	0	32.65%	919
Rowan	65.82%	2,642	34.18%	1,372	0.00%	0	31.64%	1,270
Graham	65.71%	276	34.29%	144	0.00%	0	31.43%	132
Cabarrus	65.48%	1,893	34.24%	990	0.28%	8	31.23%	903
Carteret	65.58%	1,166	34.42%	612	0.00%	0	31.16%	554
Duplin	65.55%	2,247	34.45%	1,181	0.00%	0	31.10%	1,066
Stanly	65.40%	1,115	34.55%	589	0.06%	1	30.85%	526
Alleghany	63.74%	624	36.26%	355	0.00%	0	27.48%	269
Anson	63.11%	1,865	36.89%	1,090	0.00%	0	26.23%	775
Clay	63.09%	359	36.91%	210	0.00%	0	26.19%	149
Harnett	62.76%	1,254	37.24%	744	0.00%	0	25.53%	510
Sampson	61.59%	2,551	38.41%	1,591	0.00%	0	23.18%	960
Orange	60.88%	1,668	38.83%	1,064	0.29%	8	22.04%	604
Rockingham	60.95%	2,574	39.00%	1,647	0.05%	2	21.95%	927
Gates	60.84%	1,145	39.16%	737	0.00%	0	21.68%	408
Haywood	60.69%	1,181	39.31%	765	0.00%	0	21.38%	416
Lincoln	60.67%	1,171	39.33%	759	0.00%	0	21.35%	412
Johnston	60.50%	2,805	39.50%	1,831	0.00%	0	21.01%	974
Iredell	60.06%	2,644	39.44%	1,736	0.50%	22	20.63%	908
Tyrrell	59.72%	504	40.28%	340	0.00%	0	19.43%	164
McDowell	59.08%	940	40.92%	651	0.00%	0	18.16%	289
Wilson	58.77%	2,141	41.23%	1,502	0.00%	0	17.54%	639
Chatham	58.64%	2,451	41.10%	1,718	0.26%	11	17.54%	733
Gaston	57.48%	1,356	41.46%	978	1.06%	25	16.02%	378
Transylvania	57.80%	452	42.20%	330	0.00%	0	15.60%	122
Person	57.56%	1,485	42.44%	1,095	0.00%	0	15.12%	390
Durham	56.90%	1,575	43.10%	1,193	0.00%	0	13.80%	382
Buncombe	56.58%	2,649	42.87%	2,007	0.56%	26	13.71%	642
Hyde	56.77%	881	43.23%	671	0.00%	0	13.53%	210
Macon	56.57%	706	43.11%	538	0.32%	4	13.46%	168
Burke	56.68%	1,273	43.32%	973	0.00%	0	13.36%	300
Stokes	56.11%	1,341	43.89%	1,049	0.00%	0	12.22%	292
Alamance	55.72%	1,607	43.65%	1,259	0.62%	18	12.07%	348
Pamlico	55.83%	757	44.17%	599	0.00%	0	11.65%	158
Martin	55.58%	1,564	44.42%	1,250	0.00%	0	11.16%	314
Camden	55.29%	706	44.71%	571	0.00%	0	10.57%	135
Moore	54.62%	1,769	45.32%	1,468	0.06%	2	9.29%	301
Watauga	54.58%	763	45.42%	635	0.00%	0	9.16%	128
Rutherford	54.37%	1,506	45.60%	1,263	0.04%	1	8.77%	243
Nash	54.25%	1,845	45.75%	1,556	0.00%	0	8.50%	289
Mecklenburg	54.17%	3,666	45.83%	3,101	0.00%	0	8.35%	565
Beaufort	53.80%	1,995	46.20%	1,713	0.00%	0	7.61%	282
Lenoir	53.33%	1,609	46.67%	1,408	0.00%	0	6.66%	201
Richmond	53.30%	1,946	46.70%	1,705	0.00%	0	6.60%	241
Yancey	52.70%	743	46.67%	658	0.64%	9	6.03%	85
Cumberland	52.97%	2,469	47.03%	2,192	0.00%	0	5.94%	277
Wake	52.52%	4,750	47.45%	4,291	0.03%	3	5.08%	459
Robeson	52.35%	2,503	47.65%	2,278	0.00%	0	4.71%	225
Wayne	51.91%	2,744	48.09%	2,542	0.00%	0	3.82%	202
Guilford	51.10%	2,422	47.72%	2,262	1.18%	56	3.38%	160
Pitt	51.54%	2,428	48.46%	2,283	0.00%	0	3.08%	145
Franklin	51.51%	2,121	48.49%	1,997	0.00%	0	3.01%	124
Forsyth	51.44%	2,060	48.46%	1,941	0.10%	4	2.97%	119
Ashe	51.09%	1,245	48.91%	1,192	0.00%	0	2.17%	53
Randolph	48.83%	1,968	46.90%	1,890	4.27%	172	1.94%	78
Granville	50.86%	2,184	49.14%	2,110	0.00%	0	1.72%	74
Jones	50.23%	754	49.77%	747	0.00%	0	0.47%	7
Surry	49.80%	1,402	50.20%	1,413	0.00%	0	-0.39%	-11
Brunswick	49.79%	928	50.21%	936	0.00%	0	-0.43%	-8
Pender	49.21%	1,207	50.79%	1,246	0.00%	0	-1.59%	-39
Caswell	48.94%	1,548	51.06%	1,615	0.00%	0	-2.12%	-67
Davie	48.94%	1,058	51.06%	1,104	0.00%	0	-2.13%	-46
Greene	48.71%	1,042	51.29%	1,097	0.00%	0	-2.57%	-55
Montgomery	48.40%	891	51.60%	950	0.00%	0	-3.20%	-59
Bladen	47.93%	1,410	52.07%	1,532	0.00%	0	-4.15%	-122
Davidson	47.54%	1,900	52.46%	2,097	0.00%	0	-4.93%	-197
Polk	47.48%	443	52.52%	490	0.00%	0	-5.04%	-47
Dare	46.70%	255	53.30%	291	0.00%	0	-6.59%	-36
Chowan	45.75%	699	54.25%	829	0.00%	0	-8.51%	-130
Hertford	45.70%	1,117	54.30%	1,327	0.00%	0	-8.59%	-210
Bertie	44.67%	1,545	55.33%	1,914	0.00%	0	-10.67%	-369
Yadkin	43.02%	968	55.11%	1,240	1.87%	42	-12.09%	-272
Henderson	43.79%	775	56.21%	995	0.00%	0	-12.43%	-220
Perquimans	43.67%	769	56.33%	992	0.00%	0	-12.66%	-223
Cherokee	43.26%	517	56.74%	678	0.00%	0	-13.47%	-161
Madison	42.60%	1,065	57.40%	1,435	0.00%	0	-14.80%	-370
Northampton	42.07%	1,731	57.93%	2,384	0.00%	0	-15.87%	-653
Pasquotank	41.60%	894	58.40%	1,255	0.00%	0	-16.80%	-361
Vance	41.17%	1,143	58.83%	1,633	0.00%	0	-17.65%	-490
Wilkes	39.80%	1,341	60.20%	2,028	0.00%	0	-20.39%	-687
Washington	37.75%	658	62.25%	1,085	0.00%	0	-24.50%	-427
New Hanover	37.62%	1,745	62.38%	2,894	0.00%	0	-24.77%	-1,149
Halifax	37.61%	2,424	62.39%	4,021	0.00%	0	-24.78%	-1,597
Warren	34.84%	1,145	65.16%	2,141	0.00%	0	-30.31%	-996
Craven	34.38%	1,330	65.62%	2,539	0.00%	0	-31.25%	-1,209
Edgecombe	33.85%	1,685	66.15%	3,293	0.00%	0	-32.30%	-1,608
Mitchell	33.49%	575	66.51%	1,142	0.00%	0	-33.02%	-567

== See also ==
- United States presidential elections in North Carolina
