= Grape Creek (Hiwassee River tributary) =

Stream in North Carolina, U.S.

Coordinates: 35.1156°N 84.1219°W

Grape Creek is a stream in the U.S. state of North Carolina. It is a tributary to the Hiwassee River.

== History ==
Grape Creek was named for the wild grapes which once abounded there.
