= Rhodo, North Carolina =

Unincorporated community in North Carolina, United States

Coordinates: 35°13′03″N 83°45′08″W

Rhodo is an unincorporated community in Cherokee County, in the U.S. state of North Carolina.

== History ==
A post office called Rhodo was established in 1906, and remained in operation until 1916. According to tradition, the community's name is a corruption of "raw dough", a description of a local inn's biscuits.
