= Cherokee County, North Carolina =

County in North Carolina, United States

- County
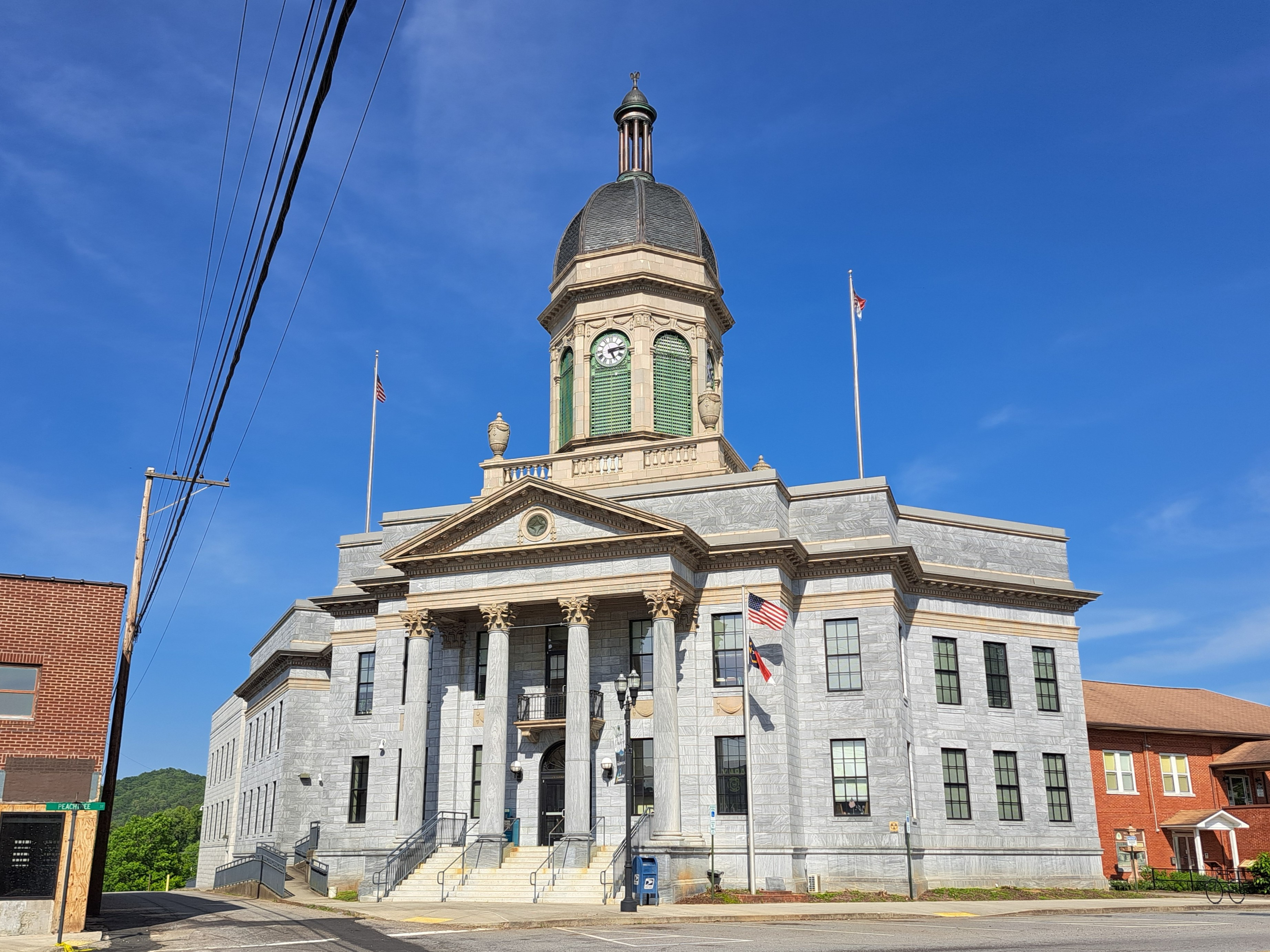
- Cherokee County Courthouse in Murphy

- Seal

- Location within the U.S. state of North Carolina
- Interactive map of Cherokee County, North Carolina
- Coordinates: 35.14°N 84.06°W
- Country: United States
- State: North Carolina
- Founded: 1839
- Named for: Cherokee Indians
- Seat: Murphy
- Largest community: Andrews

Area
  - Total: 466.67 sq mi (1,208.7 km^{2})
  - Land: 455.54 sq mi (1,179.8 km^{2})
  - Water: 11.13 sq mi (28.8 km^{2}) 2.38%

Population (2020)
  - Total: 28,774
  - Estimate (2025): 30,830 ▲
  - Density: 63.165/sq mi (24.388/km^{2})
- Demonym: Cherokee Countians
- Time zone: UTC−5 (Eastern)
  - Summer (DST): UTC−4 (EDT)
- Congressional district: 11th
- Website: www.cherokeecounty-nc.gov

Cherokee County is the westernmost county in the U.S. state of North Carolina. It borders Tennessee to its west and Georgia to its south. As of the 2020 census, the population was 28,774. The county seat is Murphy.

== History ==
This area was occupied for thousands of years by indigenous peoples who settled in the river valleys. It was part of the historic Cherokee homelands, a large territory composed of areas of what are now western Virginia, western North and South Carolina, eastern Tennessee, and northeastern Georgia.

The area that would become Cherokee County was explored by Spanish conquistador Hernando DeSoto as early as 1540. In 1813, the first highway was built through the area. The Unicoi Turnpike was the first to link East Tennessee, North Georgia, and Western North Carolina. Early white farmers who wed Native Americans were granted property along the Nottley River in 1817. In 1819, the state line separating Cherokee County from Tennessee was surveyed. The plan was to follow the highest ridges to the Georgia line. However, at Unicoi Gap surveyors immediately turned south for 15 miles, reportedly because they ran out of liquor and heard there was a moonshine still at the Georgia line. Had the surveyors followed the plan, the Tennessee cities of Ducktown and Copperhill would have been in Cherokee County. A Baptist mission center was established in the area as early as 1820. European Americans began to settle near present-day Murphy and a trading post was established prior to 1828.

The Old Tatham House at the base of Pisgah Road near Andrews was built in 1833. The two-story log cabin built by Thomas Tatham is the oldest surviving structure in the county. Fort Butler was built near Murphy in July 1836 and early court trials were held there. Fort Delaney was built by the East Tennessee Mounted Volunteers in present-day Andrews in October 1837. Both forts served as U.S. Army posts for the forced removal of Cherokee people during the Trail of Tears in June 1838.

In fall 1838, the area's land was put up for public sale in Franklin. Cherokee County was formed in 1839 from Macon County and named for the Cherokee Native Americans. A proposal to name the county Junaluska, in honor of the Cherokee leader, was rejected. The county's first brick courthouse was constructed in 1844 in downtown Murphy. Murphy was incorporated as the county seat in 1851.

Cherokee County's first industry, a tannery northeast of what would become Andrews, was established by James Stewart in 1852. As European-American population increased in the area in the 19th century, the state legislature created new counties. In 1861 the southeastern part of Cherokee County became Clay County. In 1872, its northeastern part was separated and organized as Graham County.

Harshaw Chapel, the oldest brick structure and church building in Cherokee County, was constructed in 1869. In the late 19th century, there was widespread interest in Native American cultures. In the 1870s, the Valentine brothers of Richmond, Virginia, caused extensive damage to at least eight ancient mounds in Cherokee, Haywood, Jackson, and Swain counties. They roughly excavated and looted them, seeking artifacts for the museum of their father, Mann S. Valentine, which he operated in Richmond.

The railroad came to Cherokee County in 1887, with Georgia & North Carolina Railroad's narrow gauge line from Marietta to Culberson – then the largest town in the county. The train reached Murphy the following year. The county's newspaper, the Cherokee Scout, was founded in 1889. In 1892, Cherokee County was the site of a killing that changed legal history and is still studied by law students. Moonshiner William Hall got away with murder because his lawyers argued that though he was standing in North Carolina when he fired the shot, the crime happened across the state line in Tennessee and he couldn’t be convicted of murder in North Carolina. The state supreme court threw out Hall's conviction.

=== 20th century to present ===
The first known brick house in the county, the John Tatham House, was north of Andrews. It was destroyed in the early 1900s. The Church of God denomination was organized in the Camp Creek area of Cherokee County around 1906. In 1914, the U.S. Supreme Court settled a 22-year border dispute in which parts of northern Cherokee County were claimed by Tennessee. The land was awarded to North Carolina. The Cherokee County Fair started in 1923. The 43-inmate Cherokee County Jail was built in downtown Murphy in 1922. The current Cherokee County Courthouse was constructed next door four years later. The jail was demolished in 2008 after a new 150-inmate detention center was completed on Regal Street.

The nation's oldest and largest folk school, John C. Campbell Folk School, was founded in southeast Cherokee County in 1925. US 64 to Hayesville opened in 1926. US 74 between Murphy and Andrews was created in 1927. The roads were paved in the 1940s.

The county's first medical institution was Petrie Hospital, founded in November 1933 by Dr. R.W. Petrie, an eye, ear, nose, and throat specialist. The hospital was a two-story white brick building atop a hill on Peachtree Street in downtown Murphy. It started with four registered nurses and a capacity of 21 patients. The Sisters of Providence of Holyoke came to Murphy in 1956 to manage Petrie Hospital and renamed it Providence Hospital. The 22-bed Murphy General Hospital was built by Dr. F. V. Taylor in 1941 and closed in July 1969 due to insufficient staff and property. In 1956, a $375,000, 30-bed non-profit regional hospital named District Memorial was constructed in Andrews. In January 1974 the Murphy Town Council approved spending $4,000 on a study to see whether constructing a new hospital was feasible. Following this study, Providence Hospital closed in 1978 and Murphy Medical Center was founded in 1979. Citing uncollected payments, District Memorial Hospital declared bankruptcy in 2000, closed soon afterward, and was demolished.

In the late 1930s, Hiwassee Dam was built in northwest Cherokee County by the Tennessee Valley Authority, creating Hiwassee Lake. It is the highest overspill dam in the Eastern United States and was the tallest in the world when it was completed in 1940. A second TVA dam, Apalachia, was built near the Tennessee border in 1942. Cherokee County operated on Central time until 1942. It is now located in the Eastern Time Zone. Western Carolina Regional Airport, the westernmost general aviation airport in North Carolina, was built in 1946. In the 1950s, the world's largest and most powerful pump was added to Hiwassee Dam.

The Nantahala Regional Library, headquartered in Murphy, was organized in 1937. It is the oldest regional library in North Carolina and one of the first regional libraries formed in the United States. In the early 1940s, religious tourist attraction Fields of the Wood opened in western Cherokee County with the world's largest Christian cross and biggest Ten Commandments, covering a mountainside. In June 1955, the county health department moved into a new building at its current location. Tri-County Community College was founded in Peachtree in late 1964. Cherokee County's only animal shelter, Valley River Humane Society, was founded in Marble in 1969. The countywide landfill opened in the early 1970s. A four-lane highway was built between Murphy and Andrews around 1977. One person was killed during construction.

An F4 tornado in western Cherokee County killed four people (including two children) and injured 40 on April 3, 1974. It destroyed 45 homes near Murphy, causing $13 million (1974) in damages. The F4 was the deadliest of four tornadoes that struck the county during the first four days of April that year in the 1974 Super Outbreak. An EF-2 tornado hit Murphy the night of March 2, 2012, in the Tornado outbreak of March 2–3, 2012, damaging businesses and temporarily closing two schools. An EF-1 tornado hit the Peachtree community on the night of May 8, 2024, in the Tornado outbreak of May 6–9, 2024. The Cherokee County Historical Museum was founded in 1977 and occupies a former Carnegie Library building in downtown Murphy.

From at least 2008 until 2017, the Cherokee County Department of Social Services separated children from parents without involving courts, causing some children to be placed in dangerous conditions including abuse and sexual violence after parents lost access. The children and their families sued, causing Cherokee County more than $50 million in costs related to lawsuits. The lawsuits led to higher property taxes in the county to pay the settlement.

In 2014, the U.S. Forest Service made the decision to close Hanging Dog Campground in Nantahala National Forest. In 2016, Cherokee County voters approved a measure allowing the sale of alcoholic beverages in unincorporated areas, ending its status as a dry county. Cherokee County Search and Rescue started in 2022. A proposal to open a 1,200-acre state park at the site was dismissed by the North Carolina Department of Natural and Cultural Resources in 2023, as officials said the project would cost more than $20 million. In 2025, Cherokee County's board of commissioners unanimously approved a petition to the federal government stating that the U.S. Forest Service owns too much land in the county, restricting private and commercial development, particularly along Hiwassee Lake. The petition further stated that the Forest Service is incapable of maintaining its property, hampering wildfire control, and it called on the agency to loosen logging restrictions. Lastly, the commission called for the Forest Service to relinquish property for a state park in the county. In 2026, commissioners reluctantly rescinded the petition after several thousand people signed a protest against converting public land to be used for commercial development. However, commissioners continued to call for the Forest Service to provide land on Hiwassee Lake for a state park. Tourism has become a major industry for Cherokee County. As of 2024, the tourism industry employs more than 600 people in the county and generates more than $100 million in annual visitor spending. In 2025, Cherokee County had the most growth in visitor spending of any county in North Carolina.

== Geography ==
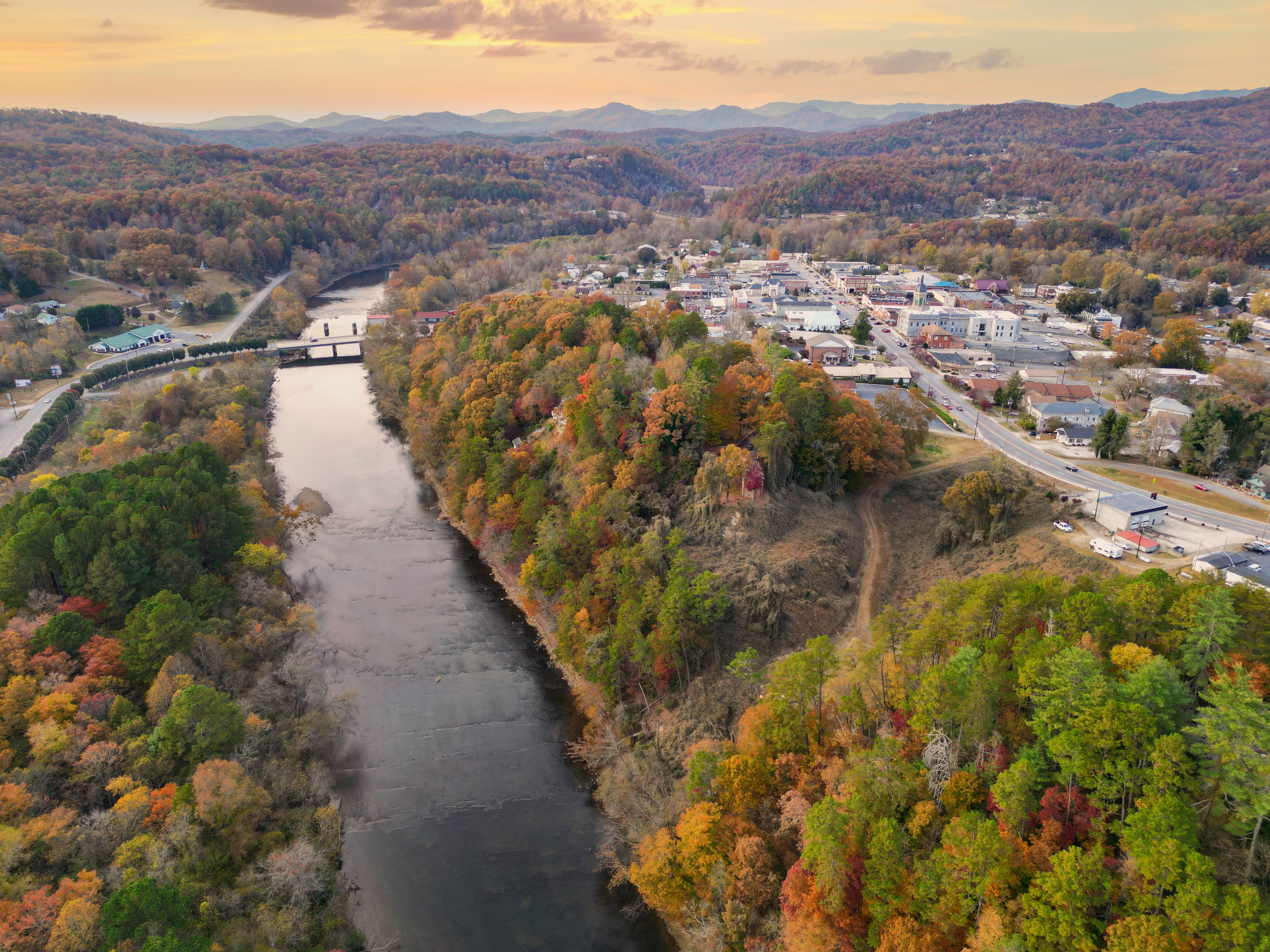
Downtown Murphy from the air; the Hiwassee River is on the left

According to the U.S. Census Bureau, the county has a total area of 466.67 square miles (1,208.7 km^{2}), of which 455.54 square miles (1,179.8 km^{2}) is land and 11.13 square miles (28.8 km^{2}) (2.38%) is water. The U.S. Forest Service owns 31 percent of the county, or 92,637 acres, as of 2025.

Located in the southern Appalachian Mountains, Cherokee County contains a varied natural landscape. Portions of the county fall within the boundaries of the Nantahala National Forest. The Hiwassee River flows into Tennessee after passing through this county from southeast to northwest; it is a tributary of the Tennessee River. Both rivers are known to have had several historic Cherokee towns and villages located along their banks.

As of 2022, the county had 25,410 acres of agricultural land and 246 farms. Cherokee County has a total of 28 dams according to the U.S. Army Corps of Engineers. Thirteen are classified as high-hazard, meaning a dam failure may be deadly; nine of those have no emergency action plans. Of the 13 high-hazard dams, eight are marked as potentially dangerous; one is considered an immediate threat. In 2026, TVA released a map showing that approximately 136 structures in Cherokee County would be flooded in the event that Clay County's Chatuge Dam failed. Sixty-five of those buildings were in Peachtree; 59 were located in Murphy.

In April 1974, parts of Cherokee County were affected by a historic weather event, the 1974 Super Outbreak of tornadoes. This affected parts of 13 states and was the second-largest such event to be recorded in the U.S.

=== Cherokee reserve ===
Portions of the Qualla Boundary are located in Cherokee County. These are non-contiguous and are separate from the main part of the Qualla Boundary, which is in Swain and Jackson counties. The land is exclusive territory of the federally recognized Eastern Band of Cherokee Indians and is protected by their Tribal Police. Following the success of Harrah's Cherokee Tribal Casino in Cherokee, the EBCI opened a second tribal casino in 2015 on a plot of their land here, located within the Murphy city limits.

=== National protected area ===
- Nantahala National Forest (part)

=== State and local protected areas ===
- Cherokee Lake Recreation Area
- Fires Creek Wildlife Management Area (part)
- Hanging Dog Recreation Area
- Nantahala National Forest Game Land (part)

=== Major water bodies ===
- Appalachia Lake
- Harold Wells Lake
- Hiwassee Lake
- Hiwassee River
- Junaluska Creek
- Little Tennessee River
- Moccasin Creek
- Nottely River
- Peachtree Creek
- Valley River
- Welch Mill Creek

Cherokee County is home to two notable waterfalls – Kennedy Falls (on private land), and the 55 feet (17 m) tall Cover Falls (near Andrews) which opened to the public in June 2026.

=== Adjacent counties ===
- Graham County – north
- Clay County – east
- Macon County – east
- Fannin County, Georgia – southwest
- Union County, Georgia – south
- Polk County, Tennessee – west
- Monroe County, Tennessee – northwest

=== Major highways ===
- US 19
- US 19 Bus. (Andrews)
- US 19 Bus. (Murphy)
- US 64
- US 74
- US 129
- NC 60
- NC 141
- NC 294

US 64, the longest highway in North Carolina, and a cross-country highway, passes through the county from east–west. US 74, which links Chattanooga, Asheville, Charlotte, and Wilmington, is a major 4-lane highway through the county. US 19 and US 129 also pass through the county, providing connections to Atlanta to the south and Knoxville to the north.

=== Major infrastructure ===
- Western Carolina Regional Airport

== Demographics ==
Historical population
Census	Pop.	Note	%±
1840	3,427		—
1850	6,838		99.5%
1860	9,166		34.0%
1870	8,080		−11.8%
1880	8,182		1.3%
1890	9,976		21.9%
1900	11,860		18.9%
1910	14,136		19.2%
1920	15,242		7.8%
1930	16,151		6.0%
1940	18,813		16.5%
1950	18,294		−2.8%
1960	16,335		−10.7%
1970	16,330		0.0%
1980	18,933		15.9%
1990	20,170		6.5%
2000	24,298		20.5%
2010	27,444		12.9%
2020	28,774		4.8%
2025 (est.)	30,830	▲	7.1%
U.S. Decennial Census; 1790–1960 1900–1990; 1990–2000 2010 2020

As of 2024, Cherokee County has the second-oldest population of any county in North Carolina. The county's median age is 52.2, just behind Brunswick County. Ten percent of Cherokee County residents are veterans; the county has the highest concentration of veterans in the state after counties with significant military and naval facilities. Cherokee County ranks second in the state for residents age 16-24 who are neither in school nor employed. The county's homeless population was about 200 as of 2025. The Cherokee Scout wrote in 2025 that affordable housing is a "serious need" in the county. A 2022 study reported the county has a housing shortage of 1,400 units.

As of 2024, Cherokee County has the third-lowest per capita income in the state: $40,021. One-fourth of its children live in poverty. As of 2025, the county's median worker income is $36,400 and the median household income is $51,500. According to North Carolina's 2025 Economic County Snapshots, Cherokee County's unemployment rate is 3.5 percent, 15 percent of residents have no kind of health insurance, and the average life expectancy is 75. As of 2025, Cherokee County has 1,277 businesses. Ninety-three percent of Cherokee County's students graduate from high school on time and 24 percent go on to complete a college degree.

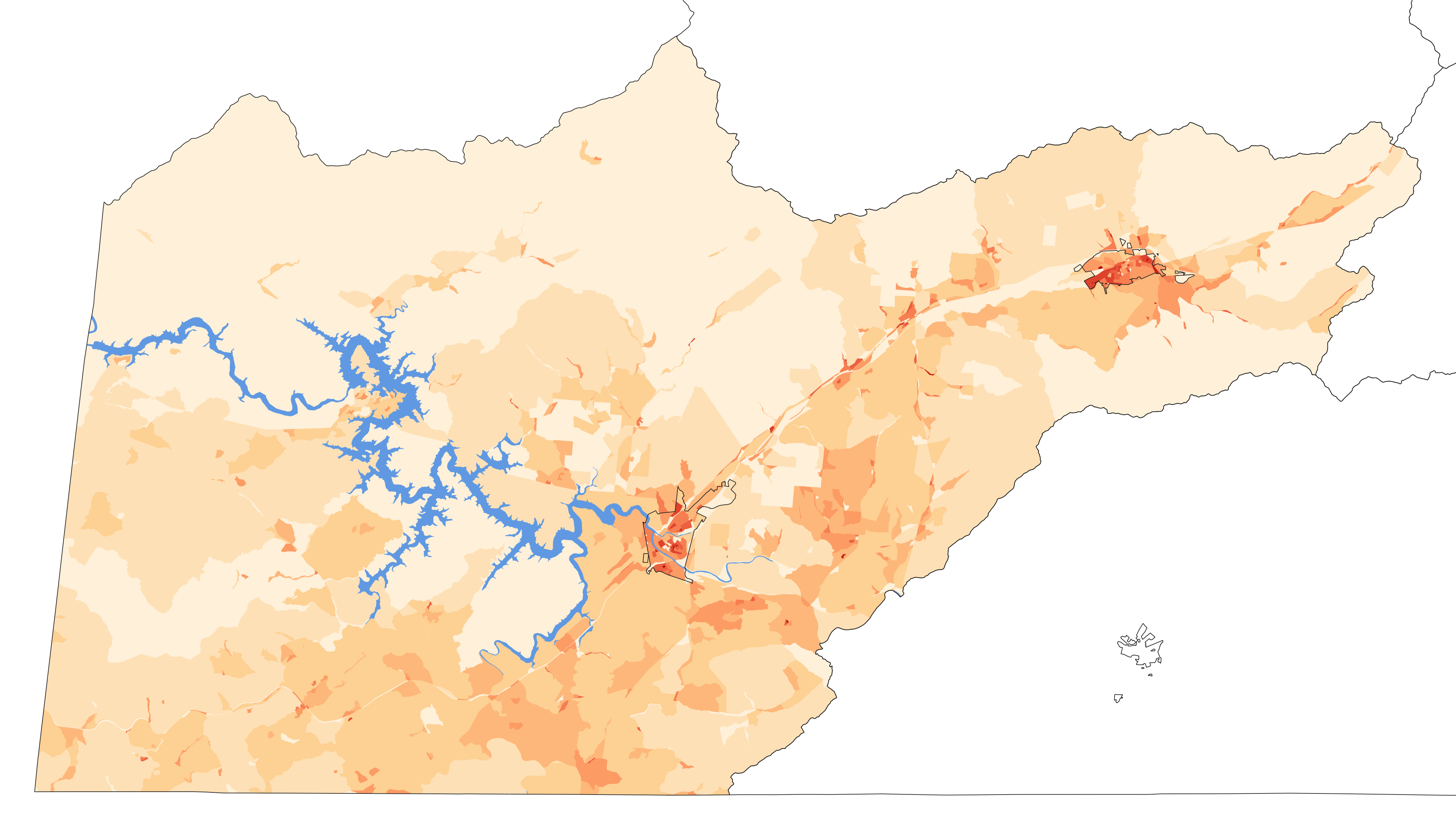
2020 population density of Cherokee County NC by census block

=== 2020 census ===
As of the 2020 census, the county had a population of 28,774 and 8,465 families. The median age was 53.1 years, 16.4% of residents were under the age of 18, and 30.4% of residents were 65 years of age or older. For every 100 females there were 96.4 males, and for every 100 females age 18 and over there were 94.3 males age 18 and over.

As of the 2020 census, the racial makeup of the county was 89.1% White, 1.3% Black or African American, 1.5% American Indian and Alaska Native, 0.5% Asian, <0.1% Native Hawaiian and Pacific Islander, 1.1% from some other race, and 6.4% from two or more races. Hispanic or Latino residents of any race comprised 3.1% of the population.

As of the 2020 census, <0.1% of residents lived in urban areas, while 100.0% lived in rural areas.

As of the 2020 census, there were 12,705 households in the county, of which 20.7% had children under the age of 18 living in them. Of all households, 50.9% were married-couple households, 18.4% were households with a male householder and no spouse or partner present, and 25.0% were households with a female householder and no spouse or partner present. About 29.3% of all households were made up of individuals and 15.7% had someone living alone who was 65 years of age or older.

As of the 2020 census, there were 17,863 housing units, of which 28.9% were vacant. Among occupied housing units, 80.3% were owner-occupied and 19.7% were renter-occupied. The homeowner vacancy rate was 2.6% and the rental vacancy rate was 11.0%.

=== Racial and ethnic composition ===
Cherokee County, North Carolina – Racial and ethnic composition Note: the US Census treats Hispanic/Latino as an ethnic category. This table excludes Latinos from the racial categories and assigns them to a separate category. Hispanics/Latinos may be of any race.
Race / Ethnicity (NH = Non-Hispanic)	Pop 1980	Pop 1990	Pop 2000	Pop 2010	Pop 2020	% 1980	% 1990	% 2000	% 2010	% 2020
White alone (NH)	18,178	19,233	22,875	25,341	25,366	96.01%	95.35%	94.14%	92.34%	88.16%
Black or African American alone (NH)	391	358	382	327	373	2.07%	1.77%	1.57%	1.19%	1.30%
Native American or Alaska Native alone (NH)	189	404	394	336	417	1.00%	2.00%	1.62%	1.22%	1.45%
Asian alone (NH)	57	39	68	131	158	0.30%	0.19%	0.28%	0.48%	0.55%
Native Hawaiian or Pacific Islander alone (NH)	x	x	3	8	0	x	x	0.01%	0.03%	0.00%
Other race alone (NH)	2	5	2	3	66	0.01%	0.02%	0.01%	0.01%	0.23%
Mixed race or Multiracial (NH)	x	x	271	610	1,495	x	x	1.12%	2.22%	5.20%
Hispanic or Latino (any race)	116	131	303	688	899	0.61%	0.65%	1.25%	2.51%	3.12%
Total	18,933	20,170	24,298	27,444	28,774	100.00%	100.00%	100.00%	100.00%	100.00%

=== 2000 census ===
At the 2000 census, there were 24,298 people, 10,336 households, and 7,369 families residing in the county. The population density was 53 people per square mile (20 people/km^{2}). There were 13,499 housing units at an average density of 30 units per square mile (12 units/km^{2}). The racial makeup of the county was 94.82% White, 1.59% Black or African American, 1.63% Native American, 0.28% Asian, 0.01% Pacific Islander, 0.45% from other races, and 1.21% from two or more races. 1.25% of the population were Hispanic or Latino of any race. 34.3% were of American, 10.8% Irish, 10.6% German and 10.3% English ancestry according to Census 2000. 97.7% spoke English and 1.2% Spanish as their first language.

There were 10,336 households, out of which 25.60% had children under the age of 18 living with them, 58.80% were married couples living together, 9.30% had a female householder with no husband present, and 28.70% were non-families. 25.70% of all households were made up of individuals, and 12.50% had someone living alone who was 65 years of age or older. The average household size was 2.32 and the average family size was 2.76.

In the county, the population was spread out, with 20.60% under the age of 18, 6.50% from 18 to 24, 24.40% from 25 to 44, 28.80% from 45 to 64, and 19.70% who were 65 years of age or older. The median age was 44 years. For every 100 females there were 94.20 males. For every 100 females age 18 and over, there were 90.70 males.

The median income for a household in the county was $27,992, and the median income for a family was $33,768. Males had a median income of $26,127 versus $18,908 for females. The per capita income for the county was $15,814. About 11.70% of families and 15.30% of the population were below the poverty line, including 19.20% of those under age 18 and 18.00% of those age 65 or over.

== Government, politics, and infrastructure ==
=== Government ===
Mandated by the laws of the State of North Carolina, Cherokee County is governed by an elected five-member board of commissioners who each serve a four-year term. The board directs the actions of the appointed Cherokee County Manager. The commission, as of 2023, is composed of Ben Adams, Dr. Dan Eichenbaum, Jan Griggs (vice-chair), Randy Phillips, and Cal Stiles (chair). Maria Hass is the clerk to the board and Darryl Brown is the county attorney. The county annual budget is $63.4 million as of 2025.

Cherokee County is a member of the regional Southwestern Commission Council of Governments.

=== Public safety ===
Thirty percent of Cherokee County's budget is spent on public safety as of 2025, making it the largest share of annual expenditures. Cherokee county had 1,619 crime incidents in 2023 – 82 of those included violence. The county had 15 violent deaths in 2022. Violent crime in Cherokee County increased by 9 percent in 2024. Cherokee County’s most common violent crimes are aggravated assault (68%) and rape (17%).

==== Sheriff and police ====
Court protection, jail management, and security for county owned property plus patrol and detective services for unincorporated county areas is provided by the Cherokee County Sheriff. The towns of Murphy and Andrews have municipal police departments. The Qualla Boundary tribal police provide security for the Cherokee Nation's Qualla Boundary territories throughout the county.

==== Fire and EMS ====
Fire protection is provided by thirteen all-volunteer fire departments in the county including those at Culberson and Murphy. Cherokee County Fire Inspector activity is part of the Cherokee County Building Code Enforcement Office.

=== Politics ===
United States presidential election results for Cherokee County, North Carolina
Year	Republican		Democratic		Third party(ies)	
Year	No.	%	No.	%	No.	%
1880	649	47.34%	722	52.66%	0	0.00%
1884	678	56.74%	517	43.26%	0	0.00%
1888	888	56.89%	673	43.11%	0	0.00%
1892	692	47.72%	692	47.72%	66	4.55%
1896	987	56.11%	770	43.77%	2	0.11%
1900	1,157	59.73%	774	39.96%	6	0.31%
1904	980	59.65%	663	40.35%	0	0.00%
1908	1,310	62.62%	782	37.38%	0	0.00%
1912	734	34.67%	906	42.80%	477	22.53%
1916	1,362	50.00%	1,362	50.00%	0	0.00%
1920	2,506	58.73%	1,761	41.27%	0	0.00%
1924	2,314	56.73%	1,742	42.71%	23	0.56%
1928	3,239	62.89%	1,911	37.11%	0	0.00%
1932	3,131	48.14%	3,348	51.48%	25	0.38%
1936	3,214	48.06%	3,473	51.94%	0	0.00%
1940	2,674	45.68%	3,180	54.32%	0	0.00%
1944	2,625	50.41%	2,582	49.59%	0	0.00%
1948	2,615	46.93%	2,771	49.73%	186	3.34%
1952	3,228	48.98%	3,363	51.02%	0	0.00%
1956	3,830	57.40%	2,843	42.60%	0	0.00%
1960	4,294	57.32%	3,197	42.68%	0	0.00%
1964	3,106	44.83%	3,823	55.17%	0	0.00%
1968	3,768	53.18%	2,402	33.90%	915	12.91%
1972	4,113	62.28%	2,411	36.51%	80	1.21%
1976	3,210	46.88%	3,571	52.15%	67	0.98%
1980	3,849	54.37%	3,114	43.99%	116	1.64%
1984	4,894	63.73%	2,776	36.15%	9	0.12%
1988	4,557	63.78%	2,567	35.93%	21	0.29%
1992	4,021	45.91%	3,686	42.09%	1,051	12.00%
1996	3,883	49.26%	3,129	39.69%	871	11.05%
2000	6,305	65.17%	3,239	33.48%	130	1.34%
2004	7,517	67.12%	3,635	32.46%	47	0.42%
2008	8,643	68.67%	3,785	30.07%	158	1.26%
2012	9,278	72.11%	3,378	26.25%	211	1.64%
2016	10,844	76.47%	2,860	20.17%	477	3.36%
2020	12,628	76.89%	3,583	21.82%	212	1.29%
2024	13,883	77.89%	3,686	20.68%	255	1.43%

Politically, Cherokee County is dominated by the Republican Party. No Democratic presidential candidate has carried Cherokee County since Jimmy Carter in 1976, and every election since 2000 saw the Republican exceed 65 percent of the county's vote, with Donald Trump exceeding 75 percent in 2016, 2020, and 2024.

Cherokee County lies within the 50th State Senate district, represented by Republican Senator Kevin Corbin, in the North Carolina Senate. It lies within the 120th district, and is represented by Republican Karl Gillespie, in the North Carolina House of Representatives.

=== Infrastructure ===
Cherokee County receives electricity from the Murphy Electric Power Board, Blue Ridge Mountain Electric Membership Corporation, and Tri-State Electric Membership Corporation. Those utilities purchase their power from TVA.

== Education ==
Cherokee County Schools manages 13 schools including Murphy, Andrews, and Hiwassee Dam high schools. As of 2025, the school system has a total enrollment of 3,001 students. The cost to educate each local student in the 2023-24 academic year was $14,972. As of 2025, 13.2 percent of Cherokee County's annual budget goes toward education. The Cherokee Scout wrote in 2025 that "it is common for young professionals to move across county and state lines to send their children to better-funded schools." The Scout said most Cherokee County Schools campuses are "badly in need of repairs and upgrades." In the early-to-mid 2020s, the system has considered further school consolidation. Unless the number of campuses in the county are reduced, the school district will go broke in a few years, school board member Steve Coleman told the Cherokee County commission in 2025.

As of 2025, only 24 percent of Cherokee County high school graduates are considered "college or career ready." Thirty-six percent of the county's students are considered "chronically absent." Approximately 20 percent of Cherokee County students are homeschooled as of 2025.

Higher education is offered at Tri-County Community College in Murphy.

The John C. Campbell Folk School, the oldest and largest folk school in the United States, is located in Brasstown, an unincorporated village near Murphy. It exists partly in Cherokee County and partly in Clay County. This institution focuses on creative folk arts, music, and dance for all ages.

== Healthcare ==
Cherokee County is served by Erlanger Western Carolina Hospital, which is certified by the U.S. Department of Health and Human Services. The facility is licensed for 191 beds, of which 120 are nursing home beds, 57 are general-use beds, and the remaining 14 are devoted to Alzheimer's patients. The hospital began as Murphy Medical Center. It was acquired by Erlanger Health System and renamed in 2019. Today it is the only hospital in the state west of Bryson City and Franklin.

Health and human services comprises 25.9 percent of Cherokee County's annual budget as of 2025 and is the county's second largest expenditure.

== Media ==
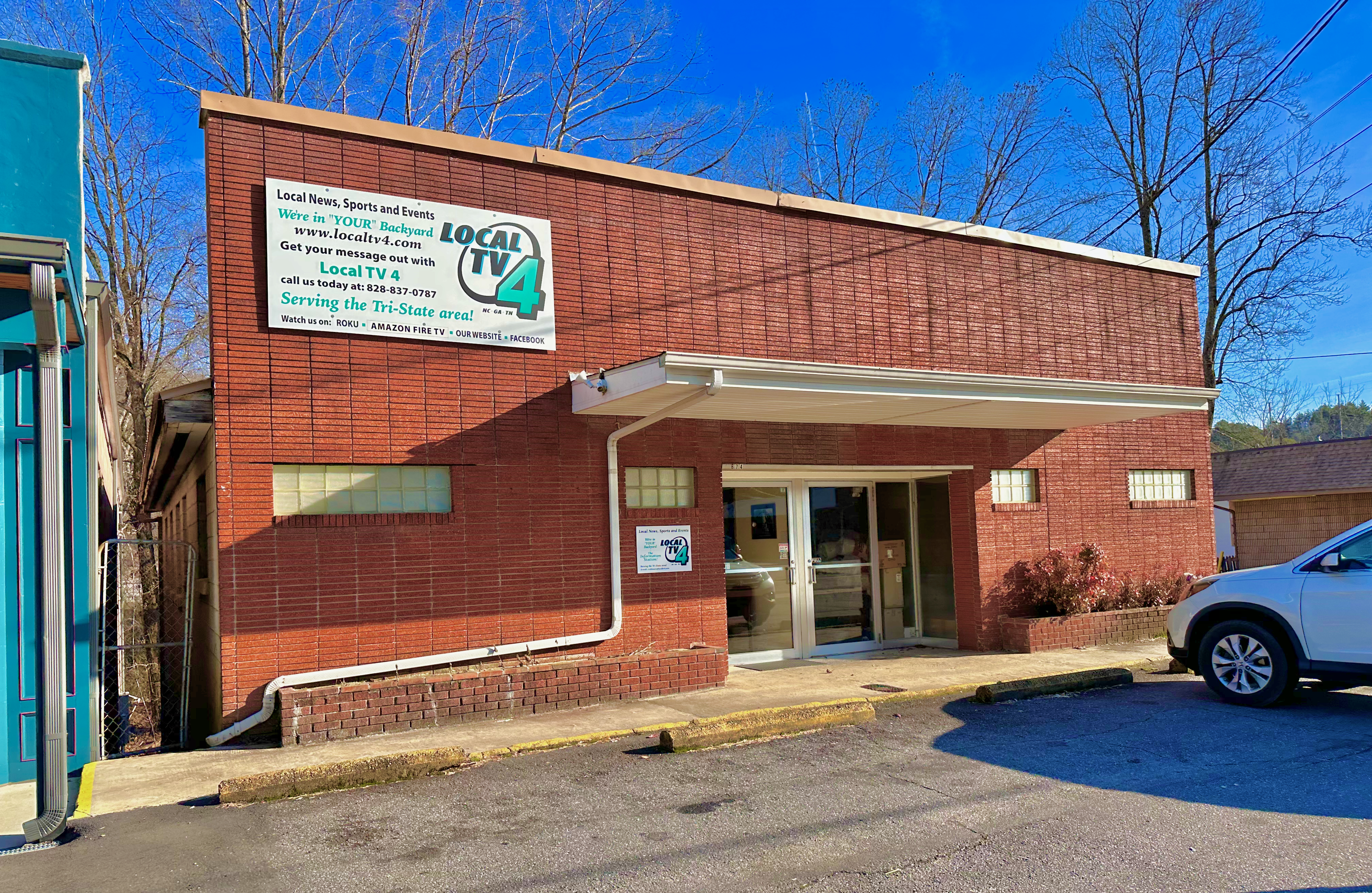
Local TV 4 television station in Murphy

The Cherokee Scout has been published weekly in Murphy since 1889. After merging with The Andrews Journal on January 1, 2019, the Scout has been the only newspaper serving Cherokee County.

WKRK 1320 AM, WCVP 600 AM, and WCNG 102.7 FM are three radio stations currently broadcast from Murphy.

Local TV 4 is a Murphy-based television news station.

== Communities ==
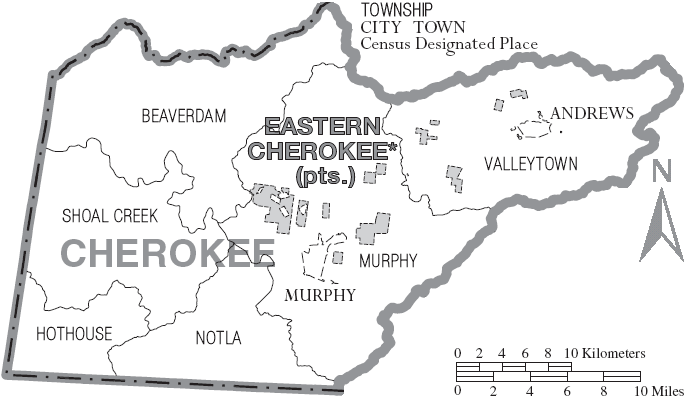
Map of Cherokee County with municipal and township labels

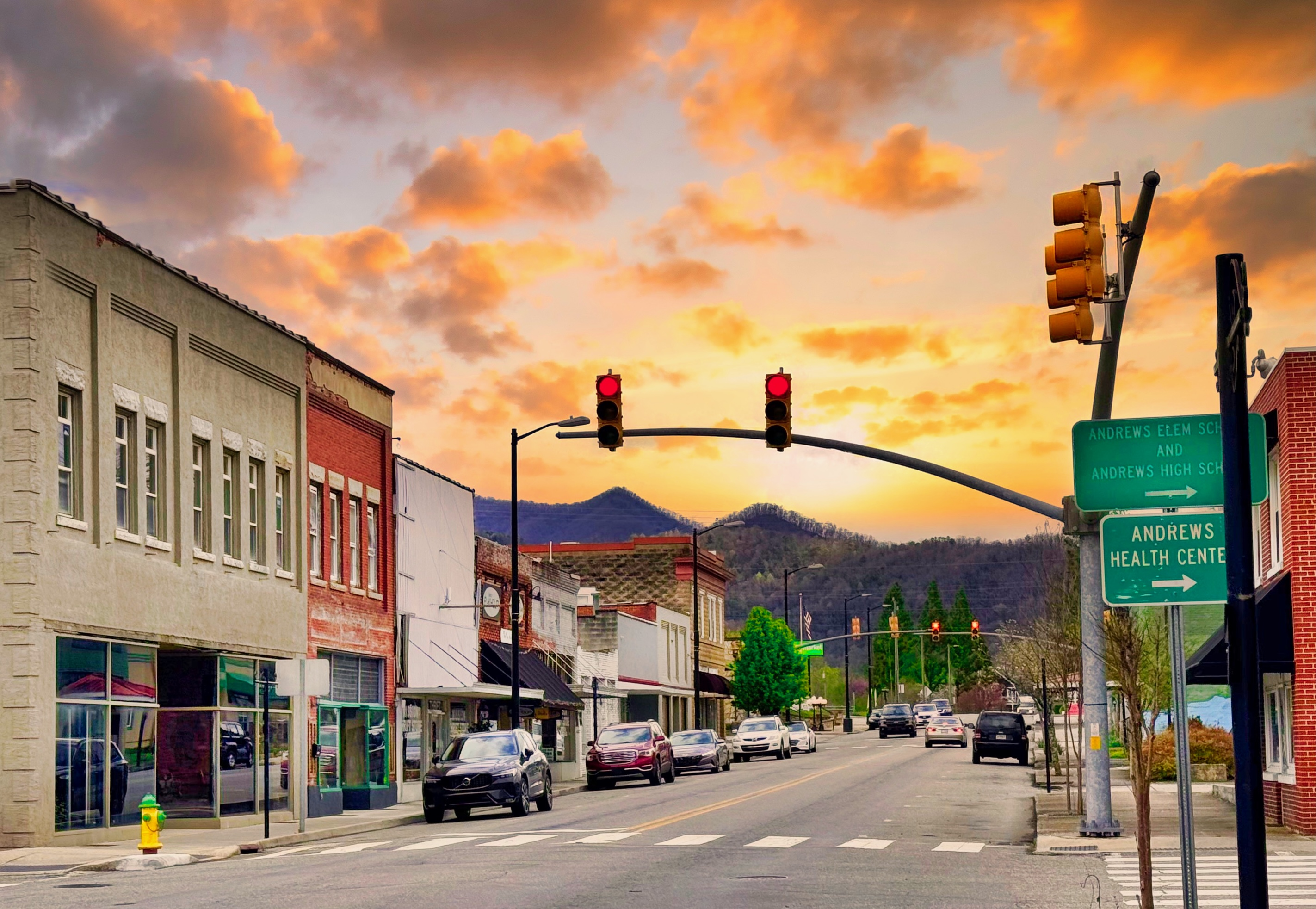
Downtown Andrews

=== Towns ===
- Andrews (largest community)
- Murphy (county seat)

=== Census-designated place ===
- Marble

=== Village ===
- Hiwassee

=== Unincorporated communities ===
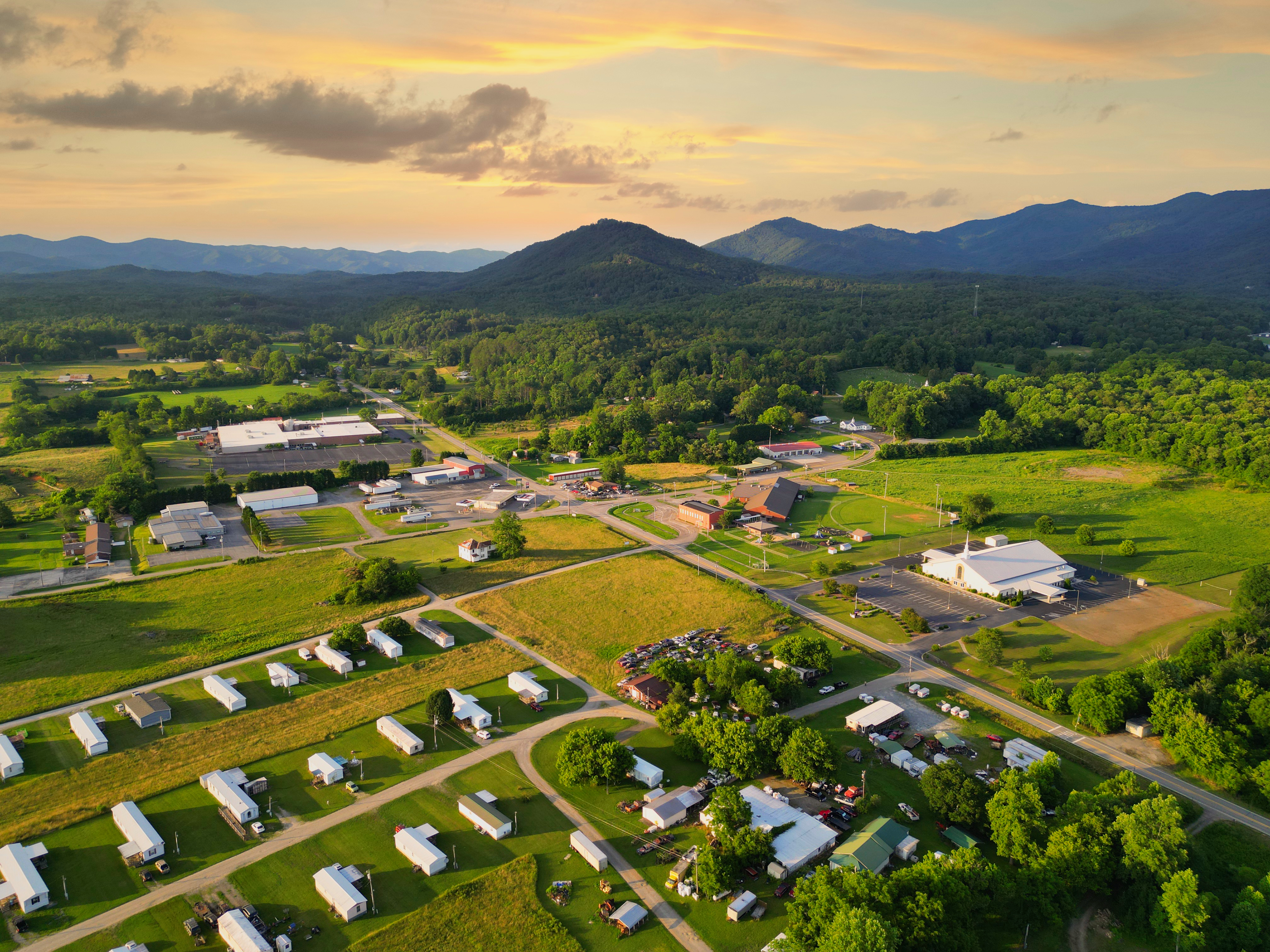
Peachtree

- Bellview
- Culberson
- Friendship
- Grape Creek
- Hanging Dog
- Hothouse
- Liberty
- Martins Creek
- Owl Creek
- Peachtree
- Ranger
- Rhodo
- Texana
- Tomotla
- Topton
- Unaka
- Violet
- Wehutty

=== Townships ===
- Beaverdam
- Hothouse
- Murphy
- Notla
- Shoal Creek
- Valleytown

== See also ==
- List of counties in North Carolina
- National Register of Historic Places listings in Cherokee County, North Carolina
- Upper Hiwassee Highlands AVA, wine region partially located in the county

== Works cited ==
- Corbitt, David Leroy (1987). The formation of the North Carolina counties, 1663–1943. Raleigh: North Carolina Division of Archives and History.
