= National Register of Historic Places listings in Haywood County, North Carolina =

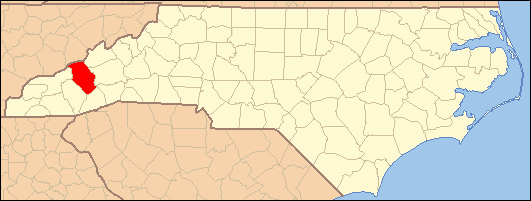

This list includes properties and districts listed on the National Register of Historic Places in Haywood County, North Carolina. Click the "Map of all coordinates" link to the right to view an online map of all properties and districts with latitude and longitude coordinates in the table below.

== Current listings ==
This National Park Service list is complete through NPS recent listings posted September 25, 2026.

	Name on the Register	Image	Date listed	Location	City or town	Description
1	Blue Ridge Parkway	Blue Ridge Parkway	December 13, 2024 (#100011353)	Blue Ridge Parkway through Virginia and North Carolina; 35°22′44″N 83°00′33″W	Waynesville vicinity	
2	Boone-Withers House	Boone-Withers House	July 21, 1983 (#83001889)	305 Church St. 35°29′26″N 82°59′25″W	Waynesville	
3	Canton Main Street Historic District	Canton Main Street Historic District	September 7, 2005 (#05000958)	Bounded roughly by Park St., Main St., Bridge St., and Adams St. 35°31′59″N 82°50′19″W	Canton	
4	Cataloochee Historic District		November 2, 2022 (#100008348)	Cataloochee Rd., Great Smoky Mountains National Park (GRSM); 35°38′24″N 83°04′50″W	Cataloochee	
5	Colonial Theater	Colonial Theater	March 15, 2000 (#00000226)	55-57 Park St. 35°31′56″N 82°50′24″W	Canton	
6	Davis Family House	Davis Family House	December 27, 1996 (#96001527)	N side of NC 1355, .8 miles NW of Ferguson Br. over the Pigeon River; 35°37′21″N 82°58′26″W	Crabtree	
7	Former Citizens Bank and Trust Company Building	Former Citizens Bank and Trust Company Building	March 14, 1991 (#91000261)	161 N. Main St. 35°29′27″N 82°59′14″W	Waynesville	
8	Former US Post Office Building	Former US Post Office Building	March 14, 1991 (#91000262)	16 S. Main St. 35°29′23″N 82°59′18″W	Waynesville	
9	Francis Grist Mill	Francis Grist Mill	May 1, 2013 (#13000228)	14 Hugh Massie Rd. 35°28′29″N 82°57′28″W	Waynesville	
10	Frog Level Historic District	Frog Level Historic District	August 28, 2003 (#03000854)	Roughly bounded by Commerce and Boundary Sts., Water St. and Richland Creek, Depot St., and 80 Commerce St. 35°29′40″N 82°59′26″W	Waynesville	
11	Green Hill Cemetery	Green Hill Cemetery	June 1, 2018 (#100000897)	Veterans Cir. 35°29′01″N 82°59′27″W	Waynesville	
12	James M. Gwyn House		July 12, 1984 (#84002335)	NC 276; 35°26′48″N 82°48′59″W	Cruso	
13	Haywood County Courthouse	Haywood County Courthouse	May 10, 1979 (#79001721)	Main and Depot Sts. 35°29′33″N 82°59′14″W	Waynesville	
14	Haywood County Hospital	Haywood County Hospital	June 18, 2018 (#100002596)	1230 N. Main St. 35°29′49″N 82°58′20″W	Waynesville	
15	Alden and Thomasene Howell House	Alden and Thomasene Howell House	April 22, 2003 (#03000300)	129 Woolsey Heights; 35°29′42″N 82°58′47″W	Waynesville	
16	Lambuth Inn	Lambuth Inn	July 29, 1982 (#82003466)	Lambeth Dr. 35°31′44″N 82°58′01″W	Lake Junaluska	
17	Masonic Hall	Masonic Hall	June 9, 1988 (#88000729)	37 Church St. 35°29′23″N 82°59′20″W	Waynesville	
18	Mount Zion United Methodist Church	Mount Zion United Methodist Church	February 5, 1986 (#86000156)	SR 1503; 35°36′18″N 82°54′14″W	Crabtree	
19	Patton Farm	Patton Farm	November 10, 1980 (#80002845)	SW of Canton; 35°32′20″N 82°52′34″W	Phillipsville	
20	Pigeon Street School	Pigeon Street School	April 26, 2021 (#100006459)	450 Pigeon St. 35°29′02″N 82°58′59″W	Waynesville	
21	Charles and Annie Quinlan House	Charles and Annie Quinlan House	September 7, 2005 (#05000959)	274 S. Main St. 35°29′12″N 82°59′27″W	Waynesville	
22	Clyde H. Ray Sr. House	Clyde H. Ray Sr. House	October 22, 1996 (#96001089)	803 1/2 Love Ln. 35°29′49″N 82°59′32″W	Waynesville	
23	Shackford Hall	Shackford Hall	April 25, 2001 (#01000419)	80 Shackford Hall Rd. 35°31′28″N 82°58′41″W	Lake Junaluska	
24	Shelton House	Shelton House	January 31, 1979 (#79001722)	307 Shelton St. 35°29′05″N 82°59′09″W	Waynesville	
25	Shook-Welch-Smathers House	Shook-Welch-Smathers House	September 12, 2008 (#08000891)	178 Morgan St. 35°31′54″N 82°55′05″W	Clyde	
26	Smathers-Gautier House		October 1, 2026 (#100013486)	124 Daisey Avenue; 35°29′13″N 82°59′45″W	Waynesville	
27	Frank Smathers House	Frank Smathers House	July 10, 1998 (#98000730)	724 Smathers St. 35°30′24″N 82°58′51″W	Waynesville	
28	Spread Out Historic District	Spread Out Historic District	December 28, 2010 (#10001095)	Roughly bounded by N. Main St., Walnut St., and Beech St. 35°29′51″N 82°58′45″W	Waynesville	
29	Dr. J. Howell Way House	Dr. J. Howell Way House	September 11, 1980 (#80002846)	301 S. Main St. 35°29′16″N 82°59′21″W	Waynesville	
30	Waynesville Main Street Historic District	Waynesville Main Street Historic District	December 16, 2005 (#05001414)	Roughly bounded by Depot St., Church and E. Sts, Wall St., and Montgomery St. 35°29′29″N 82°59′15″W	Waynesville	
31	West Fork Pigeon River Pratt Truss Bridge	West Fork Pigeon River Pratt Truss Bridge	January 10, 2019 (#100003296)	Spans the West Fork of Pigeon R. between L. Logan Rd. & Heavenly Dr, .6 mi. S of US 276; 35°27′49″N 82°54′00″W	Bethel	
32	Windover	Windover	January 25, 2018 (#100002048)	40 Old Hickory St. 35°29′13″N 83°00′05″W	Waynesville	

== See also ==
- National Register of Historic Places listings in North Carolina
- List of National Historic Landmarks in North Carolina
