= S. C. Herren =

American politician

Member of the Washington House of Representatives
- In office 1889–1891

Personal details
- Born: February 21, 1929 Waynesville, North Carolina, United States
- Died: February 14, 1929 (aged 73) Chicago, Illinois, United States
- Party: Republican

Samuel C. Herren (February 14, 1856 – February 21, 1929) was an American politician in the state of Washington. He served in the Washington House of Representatives from 1889 to 1891.
