= Senator Love =

Senator Love may refer to:

- Fredrick Love (fl. 2010s–present), Arkansas State Senate
- Garrett Love (born 1988), Kansas State Senate
- James M. Love (1820–1891), Iowa State Senate
- John Love (congressman) (died 1822), Virginia State Senate
- Peter Early Love (1818–1866), Georgia State Senate
- Robert Love (soldier) (1760–1845), North Carolina State Senate
- Sara N. Love (born 1967), Maryland State Senate
- Shirley Love (politician) (born 1933), West Virginia State Senate
- Taft Love (born 1974/75), Wyoming State Senate
- William F. Love (1850–1898), Mississippi State Senate
- William L. Love (1872–after 1951), New York State Senate
