= The Mountaineer =

Newspaper in Waynesville, North Carolina, U.S.

- Type: Weekly newspaper
- Format: Broadsheet
- Owner: The Mountaineer Publishing Company
- Publisher: Jonathan Key
- Editor: Becky Johnson
- Political alignment: Moderate
- Language: English
- Headquarters: Waynesville, North Carolina United States
- Sister newspapers: Biltmore Beacon
- Website: themountaineer.com

The Mountaineer is a newspaper based in Waynesville, North Carolina. The newspaper is owned by The Mountaineer Publishing Company.

== History ==
The Waynesville Courier began publishing on February 8, 1888. Jesse Daniel Boone sold the paper in 1902 to G.C. Briggs.

Briggs turned it into a daily publication in 1906, but reverted in back to a weekly publication after two years.

In 1912, Briggs sold the paper to R.B. Wilson and Harry Hall. Hall sold his half to Wilson in 1914 and left to take over the Haywood Enterprise, a competing paper. Financial strain caused the Enterprise to fold in 1915.

The Courier soon felt the crunch of poor economic times and was sold at public auction two years later to previous owner Jesse Daniel Boone for $1,400. Boone had started another paper in 1913, The Carolina Mountaineer.

After purchasing the Courier at auction in 1917, Boone consolidated the two weeklies into The Carolina Mountaineer and Waynesville Courier. In 1925, Boone sold the now profitable paper to W.A. Band. Band changed the name to the Waynesville Mountaineer later that year.

In 1930, the paper moved from its old office on Church Street to the building on Main Street owned by the law firm of Morgan and Ward. Band sold the Waynesville Mountaineer to Wilbur T. Betts and Thomas M. Seawell later that year.

By the middle of 1931, Betts had moved away and Seawell was running the paper alone. It began to fall on shaky financial ground. Two employees, W. Curtis Russ, the business manager and ad salesman, and Paul D. Deaton, a linotype operator, leased the paper from Betts for one year to see if they could make it profitable. They assumed control of the paper on Nov. 5, 1931 and purchased it from Betts and Seawell on July 1, 1932.

In 1933, Deaton sold his interest in the paper to Marion T. (Buster) Bridges. The partnership of Russ and Bridges lasted until 1979. It was the longest tenure of any editor and publisher. In 1925, the paper's name was changed to The Mountaineer. “Waynesville” was dropped from the name to coincide with the opening of an office in Canton and to reflect more countywide news coverage. The Mountaineer converted to offset printing in the 1960s when they purchased a Goss press and installed it in the basement.

In 1979, the Mountaineer was sold to the Daniels family, owners of the News and Observer in Raleigh. Jack Andrews was named publisher. In 1980, Ken Wilson, previously publisher of the Mount Olive Tribune, a News and Observer subsidiary, was hired as publisher.

In 1990, Adelaide Daniels Key, daughter of Jonathan Daniels, long time editor of the News and Observer, purchased The Mountaineer in Waynesville, N.C., Haywood County's newspaper of record, The Enterprise in Canton N.C. and The News Record in Marshall N.C., the Madison County newspaper of record, from the family chain. Her son, Jonathan Key, was hired in 1991 as General Manager. In 1994, the financially strapped Enterprise was merged with The Mountaineer to create The Enterprise Mountaineer and the News Record was sold.

Jonathan Key was named publisher of The Mountaineer on January 1, 2000 and purchased the Mountaineer Publishing Company from Adelaide D. Key in February 2002. The word Enterprise was dropped from the masthead of the newspaper because The Mountaineer had become the dominant name the paper was referred to across the county.

The newspaper's website was launched in the mid 1990s. MPC shuttered the pressroom and sold its presses in 2011 and began printing in Bristol, Tennessee due to the limitations of their press and the demands of customers for more color in their printing. The old pressroom is now the Wells Event Center.
