= Shelton House (Waynesville, North Carolina) =

Historic house in North Carolina, United States

- U.S. National Register of Historic Places
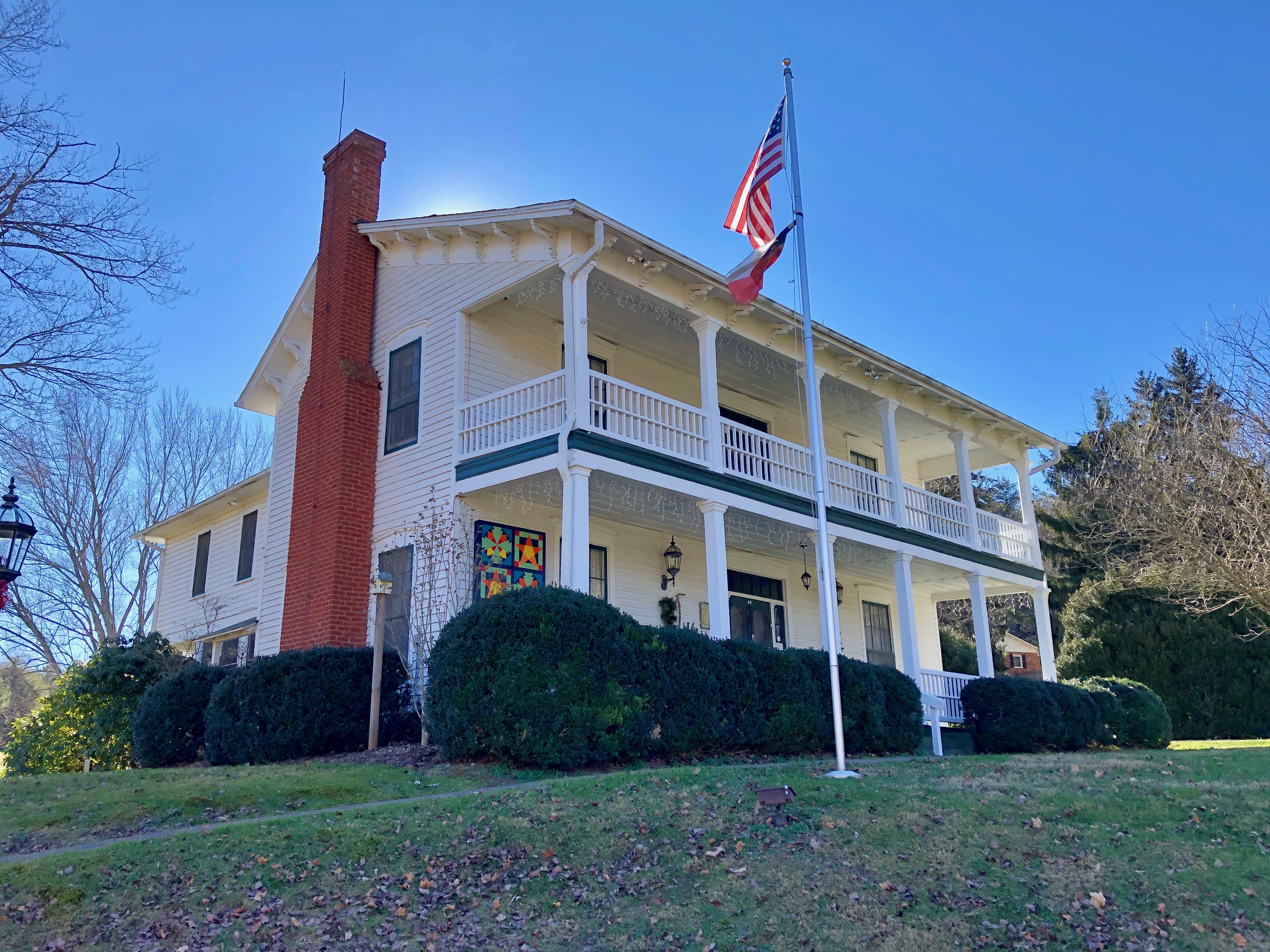
- Shelton House, January 2019

- Location within North Carolina Location within the United States
- Location: 307 Shelton St., Waynesville, North Carolina
- Coordinates: 35°29′05″N 82°59′09″W
- Area: 8.5 acres (3.4 ha)
- Built: c. 1878
- NRHP reference No.: 79001722
- Added to NRHP: January 31, 1979

Shelton House is a historic home located at Waynesville, Haywood County, North Carolina. The front section was built about 1878, with a later two-story rear wing. It features an engaged two-tier front porch and stepped-shoulder, gable end brick chimneys.

It was listed on the National Register of Historic Places in 1979.

Shelton House is now a historic house museum that features historic furnishings and decorative items, heritage crafts, agricultural exhibits, and items of today's crafters and artisans. The early 20th century barn includes antique farm tools.

By 1918, the home was inhabited by William Taylor Shelton. Shelton spent 26 years as an instructor in Native American schools in North Carolina, Arizona, and New Mexico, including the Cherokee Indian School in Yellow Hill, North Carolina.
