= Waynesville Municipal Building =

Historic building in North Carolina, US

- Former US Post Office Building
- U.S. National Register of Historic Places
- U.S. Historic district – Contributing property
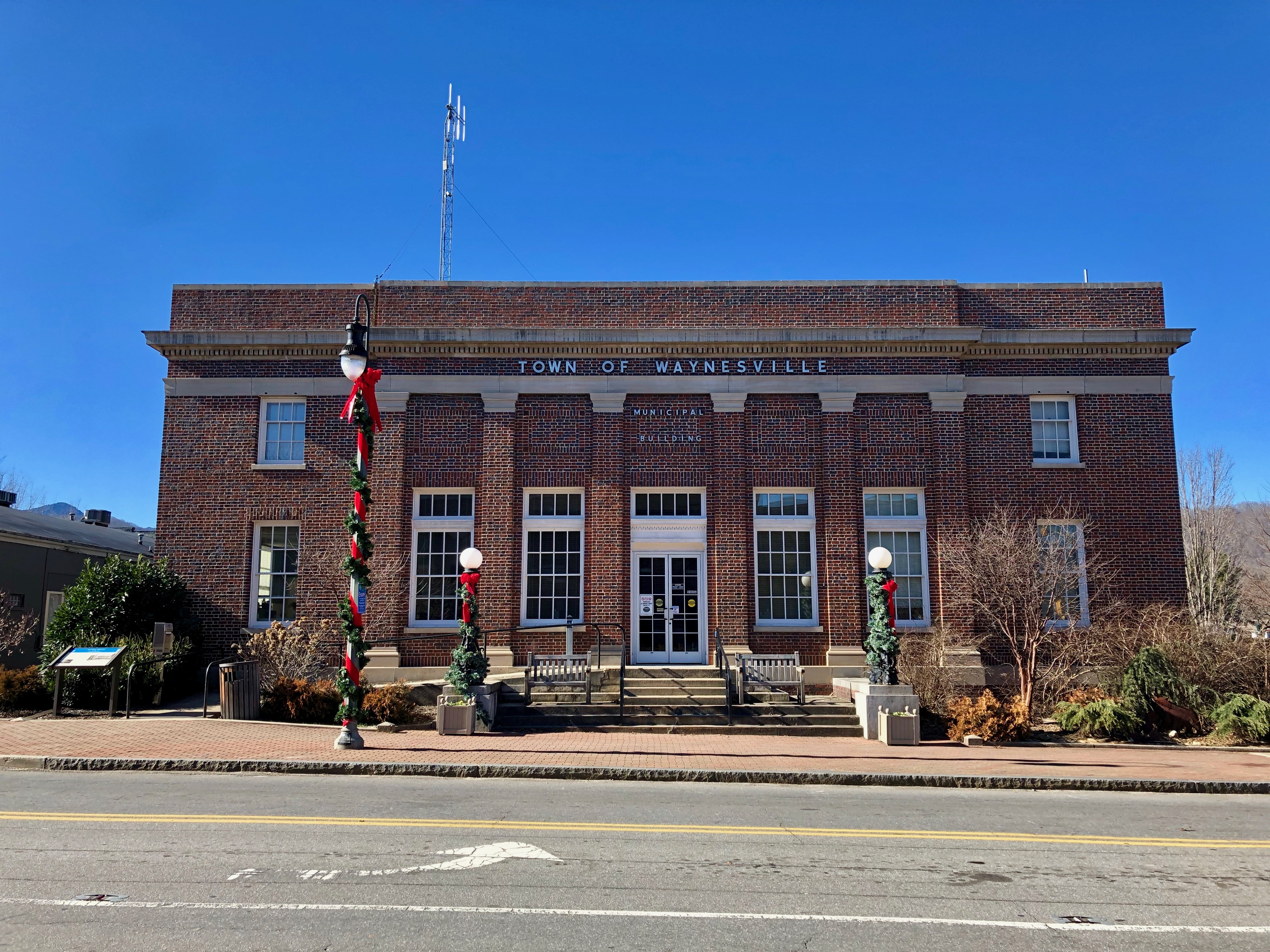
- Former U.S. Post Office Building (now the Municipal Building)

- Location within North Carolina Location within the United States
- Location: 16 S. Main St., Waynesville, North Carolina
- Coordinates: 35.4896°N 82.9883°W
- Area: 0.3 acres (0.12 ha)
- Built: 1917
- Architect: Office of the Supervising Architect under James A. Wetmore
- Architectural style: Classical Revival
- NRHP reference No.: 91000262
- Added to NRHP: March 14, 1991

The Waynesville Municipal Building, also known as the Former US Post Office Building, is a historic post office building located at Waynesville, Haywood County, North Carolina. Its construction in 1917 was supervised by the Office of the Supervising Architect under James A. Wetmore, and is a two-story, brick rectangular building in the Classical Revival style with a one-story rear extension. It measures 58 feet by 73 feet and features brick Ionic order pilasters with granite bases and capitals. The building housed Waynesville's post office until 1966 when it was purchased by the Town of Waynesville to serve as its Municipal Building.

It was listed on the National Register of Historic Places in 1991. It is located in the Waynesville Main Street Historic District.

In 2026 The Mountaineer reported that original blueprints were found from as early as 1913. These will help with historic preservation work for which the town has been awarded a grant.
