= Tropical Storm Fred (2021) =

Atlantic tropical storm

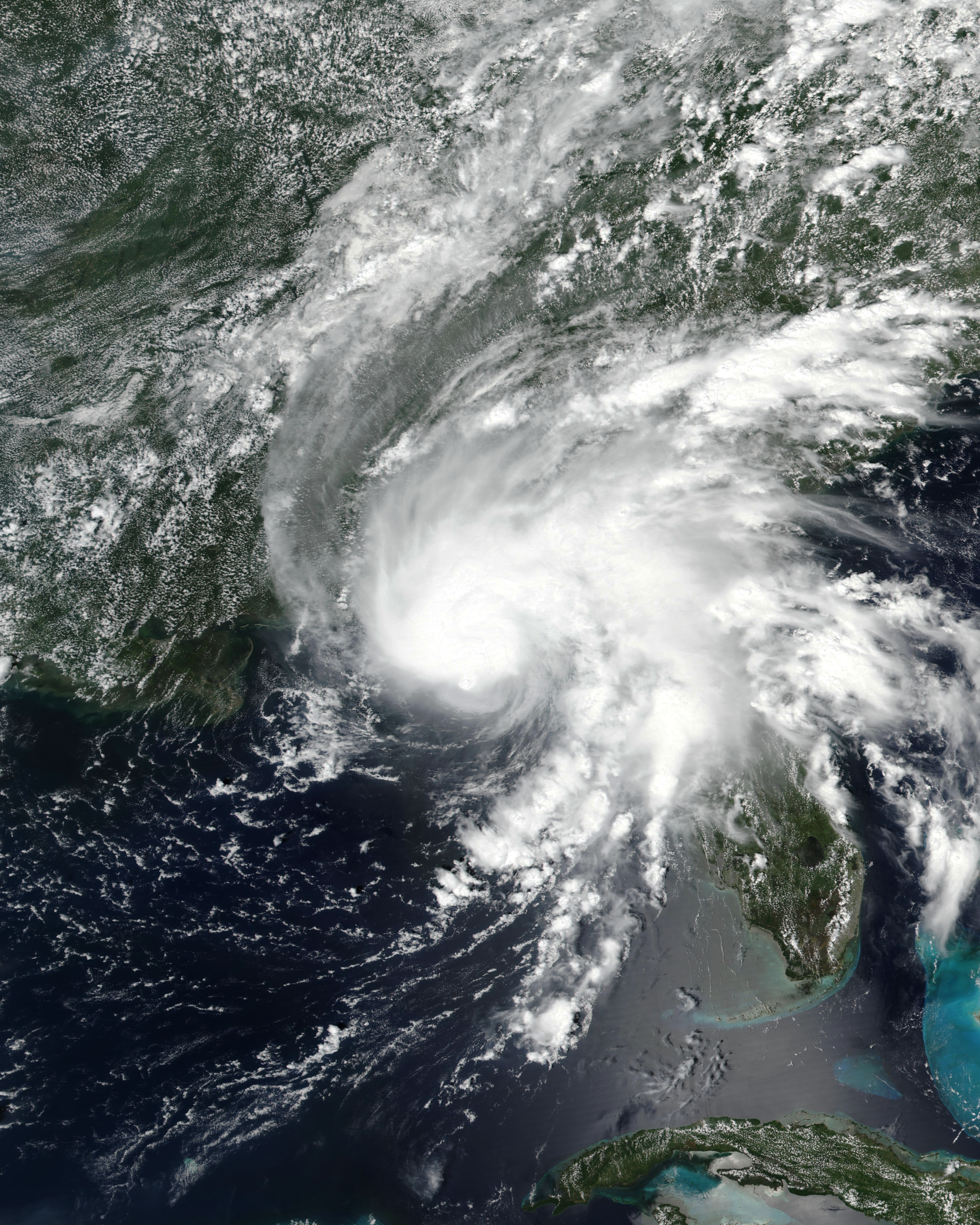
- Tropical Storm Fred nearing landfall in the Florida Panhandle on August 16

Meteorological history
- Formed: August 11, 2021
- Remnant low: August 17, 2021
- Dissipated: August 20, 2021

Tropical storm
- 1-minute sustained (SSHWS/NWS)
- Highest winds: 65 mph (100 km/h)
- Lowest pressure: 991 mbar (hPa); 29.26 inHg

Overall effects
- Fatalities: 7 total
- Damage: $1.3 billion (2021 USD)
- Areas affected: Lesser Antilles, Greater Antilles, Eastern United States (particularly Florida and North Carolina), Southern Quebec, The Maritimes
- IBTrACS
- Part of the 2021 Atlantic hurricane season

Tropical Storm Fred was a tropical cyclone which affected portions of the Greater Antilles and the Southeastern United States in August 2021. The sixth tropical storm of the 2021 Atlantic hurricane season, Fred originated from a tropical wave first noted by the National Hurricane Center on August 4. As the wave drifted westward, advisories were initiated on the wave as a potential tropical cyclone by August 9 as it was approaching the Leeward Islands. Entering the Eastern Caribbean Sea after a close pass to Dominica by the next day, the potential tropical cyclone continued northwestward. By August 11, the disturbance had formed into Tropical Storm Fred just south of Puerto Rico, shortly before hitting the Dominican Republic on the island of Hispaniola later that day. The storm proceeded to weaken to a tropical depression over the highly mountainous island, before emerging north of the Windward Passage on August 12. The disorganized tropical depression turned to the west and made a second landfall in Northern Cuba on August 13. After having its circulation continuously disrupted by land interaction and wind shear, the storm degenerated into a tropical wave as it was turning northward near the western tip of Cuba the following day. Continuing north, the remnants of Fred quickly re-organized over the Gulf of Mexico, regenerating into a tropical storm by August 15. Fred continued towards the Florida Panhandle and swiftly intensified to a strong 65 mph (105 km/h) tropical storm before making landfall late on August 16 and moving into the state of Georgia. Afterward, Fred continued moving north-northeastward, before degenerating into an extratropical low on August 18. Fred's remnants later turned eastward, and the storm's remnants dissipated on August 20, near the coast of Massachusetts.

Fred caused power outages in the Dominican Republic. Over 500,000 people lost access to water after the country's aqueduct system failed. Flooding also affected Cuba. Fred also caused over 36,000 power outages in Florida. One person died in the state from hydroplaning. In North Carolina, Fred caused catastrophic flooding that destroyed many homes and claimed six lives. The tropical storm and its remnants also caused a tornado outbreak consisting of 30 tornadoes over a span of three days. A total of 7 people were killed, and economic losses were estimated at US$1.3 billion in the United States alone.

== Meteorological history ==
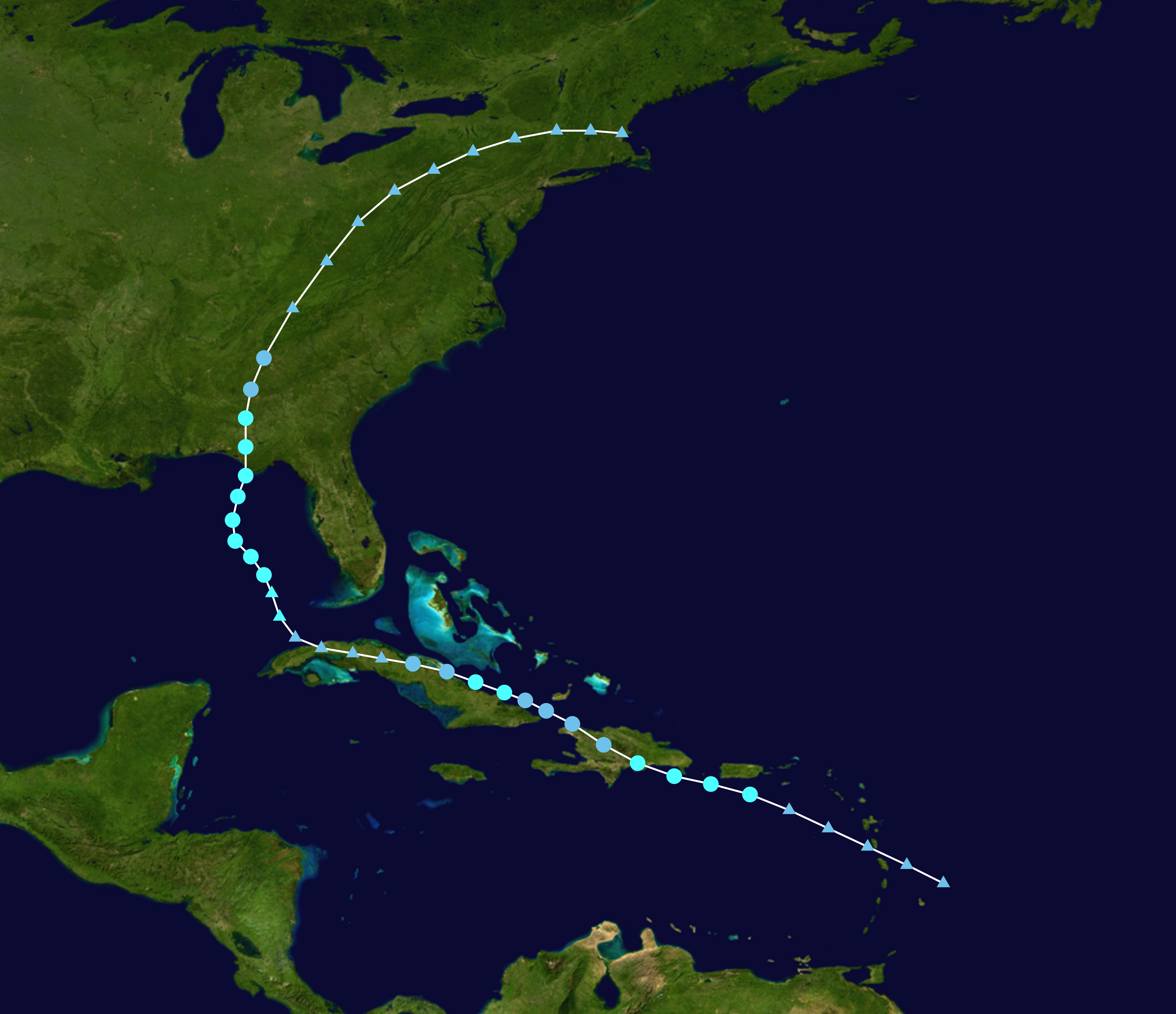
Map plotting the storm's track and intensity, according to the Saffir–Simpson scale Map key Saffir–Simpson scale Tropical depression (≤38 mph, ≤62 km/h) Tropical storm (39–73 mph, 63–118 km/h) Category 1 (74–95 mph, 119–153 km/h) Category 2 (96–110 mph, 154–177 km/h) Category 3 (111–129 mph, 178–208 km/h) Category 4 (130–156 mph, 209–251 km/h) Category 5 (≥157 mph, ≥252 km/h) Unknown Storm type Tropical cyclone Subtropical cyclone Extratropical cyclone, remnant low, tropical disturbance, or monsoon depression

On August 4 at 12:00 UTC, the National Hurricane Center (NHC) noted a tropical wave which had formed in the central Atlantic. Initially not deemed likely to develop, the wave's chances of development were raised on August 8 as it approached the Leeward Islands. As thunderstorm activity began to consolidate, the disturbance proceeded to receive the designation as Potential Tropical Cyclone Six as it approached closer to the Leeward Islands at August 9 at 21:00 UTC, the classification "potential tropical cyclone" used by the NHC indicating a storm not yet a tropical cyclone but a land threat requiring issuance of forecasts. The disturbance passed just south of Dominica, or 55 miles (89 km) south of Guadeloupe early on August 10, entering the Northeastern Caribbean Sea at around 09:00 UTC that day. Despite having a well-organized appearance on satellite imagery resembling a cyclone at tropical storm strength, surface observations and data from a NOAA Hurricane Hunter aircraft flown into the disturbance earlier in the day confirmed the storm had not yet acquired a well-defined closed circulation. Passing south of the Virgin Islands, radar imagery continued to affirm that the disturbance had not yet formed into a tropical cyclone with multiple areas of rotation being evident and not resembling a well-defined circulation. However, following yet another hurricane hunter reconnaissance flight into the disturbance, data confirmed it was defined enough to be designated Tropical Storm Fred 45 miles (72 km) south of Ponce, Puerto Rico on August 11 at 03:00 UTC.

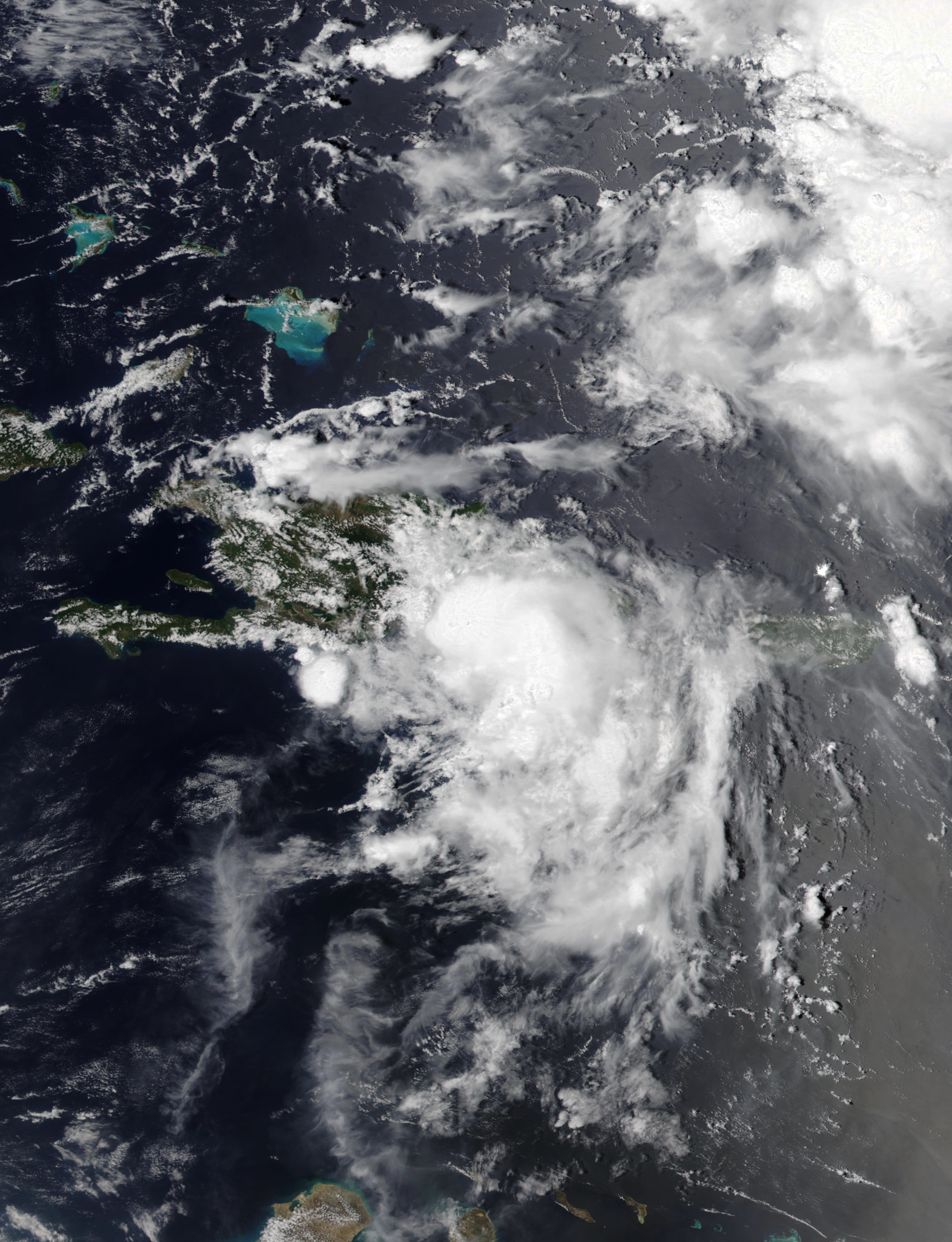
Tropical Storm Fred making landfall in the Dominican Republic on August 11

Fred's circulation continued to become better defined as reconnaissance aircraft data further confirmed the storm had intensified slightly with winds at 45 mph (72 km/h). Shortly after, Fred made landfall just west of Santo Domingo in the Dominican Republic at around 18:00 UTC that day. Fred's circulation was quickly disrupted by the mountainous terrain of the island of Hispaniola, weakening to a tropical depression over the central part of the island early on August 12. After emerging back over the waters north of the Windward Passage at 09:00 UTC, Fred had lost a majority of its thunderstorm activity over the center which itself had become broad and ill-defined, further exacerbated by 20 knots of westerly wind shear inflicted by an upper-level trough near Florida. As Fred slowly drifted west-northwestward, continued unfavorable conditions led to Fred struggling to re-organize, with its mid-level and low-level centers being displaced around 50 miles (80 km) from each other according to reconnaissance aircraft data. Fred shifted almost due westward and its low-level center moved inland over northern Cuba around 18:00 UTC on August 14. Jogging a little further west than forecasted, continued land interaction with Cuba and wind shear caused Fred to degenerate into a tropical wave at 15:00 UTC on August 14, although advisories continued due to a potential land threat to Florida and the possibility of regeneration.

The remnants of Fred turned northward into the Gulf of Mexico and began to re-organize, attaining gale-force winds and an organized band of thunderstorms to the east of its trough axis. Furthermore, hurricane hunter reconnaissance data confirmed that the remnants had developed an organized circulation and that Fred had regenerated into a tropical storm at 12:40 UTC on August 15. A lopsided tropical cyclone, most of the strongest winds were displaced to the east of the partially exposed center as the storm increased in strength once more. Fred continued intensifying in a marginally favorable environment with 30 °C (86 °F) sea surface temperatures and a relatively moist atmosphere, with bursts of convection forming into a small central dense overcast over the center which was slightly more east than depicted as confirmed by reconnaissance aircraft. Fred reached its peak intensity as a strong tropical storm with winds of 65 mph (105 km/h) at 18:00 UTC on August 16 shortly before making landfall a few miles southeast of Mexico Beach near Cape San Blas, Florida at a similar intensity around an hour later at 19:15 UTC. Fred rapidly weakened shortly after landfall, weakening to a tropical depression over Georgia by 09:00 UTC the next day.

== Preparations and impact ==
=== Caribbean ===
Fred caused $10 million in damage in the Caribbean.

==== Lesser Antilles ====
Potential Tropical Cyclone Six approaching Puerto Rico on August 10.

In Guadeloupe, Météo-France raised yellow wind alerts as the precursor disturbance to Fred approached the island country. Martinique also received the same alert and reported gusty winds and rainfall as the wave passed just to the north of the island.

Tropical storm watches were also issued across Dominica and Barbados and the previously mentioned islands with the designation of Potential Tropical Cyclone Six.

==== Puerto Rico ====
With the designation of Potential Tropical Cyclone Six moving towards Puerto Rico, tropical storm warnings were raised on August 9. By the next day, following the formation of Fred, heavy rain from the storm's outer rainbands produced heavy rainfall and brief but intense squalls which knocked out power to over 13,000 people in parts of the island. Governor Pedro Pierluisi noted that some gas stations shut down as large amounts of people came to fuel prior to the storm. Eight shelters were also opened on the island, although only seven people sought refuge. A 55 km/h (34 mph) wind gust was recorded in Lajas.

==== Hispaniola ====
In the Dominican Republic, tropical storm warnings were issued as Fred approached the island on August 10. Upon landfall near Santo Domingo, 400,000 people lost power across the country. Flooded rivers causing the shutdown the country's aqueduct system caused more than 500,000 people to lose access to water. In Santo Domingo, 1,700 people were evacuated and at least 100 homes were damaged. More than 47 communities were cut off and 4,025 people were displaced by flash flooding caused by the storm, while 805 homes in total were damaged across the country; at least 5 were entirely destroyed. 47 flights were cancelled or delayed at Las Américas International Airport and La Isabela International Airport. Social media reported street closures and the collapse of a bridge in Santo Domingo.

In Haiti, the Civil Protection Unit issued a yellow level of vigilance (risk of impact at low to moderate intensity) as Fred crossed into the country. The Directorate for Civil Protection reminded civilians to be cautious of floods and mudslides.

=== United States ===
Fred caused a total of $1.1 billion in economic losses in the U.S.

==== Florida ====
Tropical Storm Fred making landfall in Cape San Blas, Florida.

On August 15, tropical storm watches were issued for the majority of the Florida Panhandle as the remnants of Fred drifted northward. As Fred regenerated and approached the state, the prior watches were upgraded to tropical storm warnings. Franklin County officials issued a voluntary evacuation order later that same day. Bay County officials warned residents to prepare for flooding rainfall events. Fort Pickens and Gulf Islands National Seashore was shut down on August 14 at 8:00 p.m. due to the approaching storm.

Following landfall, more than 36,000 people in Florida reportedly lost electricity. Schools in Bay County, Okaloosa County, and Santa Rosa County were immediately closed. 7 inches (180 mm) of rain fell in Panama City within 24 hours, while 9 inches (229 mm) of rain reportedly fell in Southport, where serious flooding was evident. Several water rescues were carried out across Panama City, where many were rescued from their flooded homes, with no injuries reported. Also in Panama City, a downed power line fell on top of a car with a man inside, trapping the man until he was rescued and hospitalized with a broken neck. U.S. President Joe Biden approved the issuance of a state of emergency for 23 counties in the state soon after landfall. Fred brought storm surge flooding across St. George Island, Cape San Blas, and Port St. Joe, while the road to Indian Pass was blocked after being covered with over 5 feet of water.

==== Georgia ====
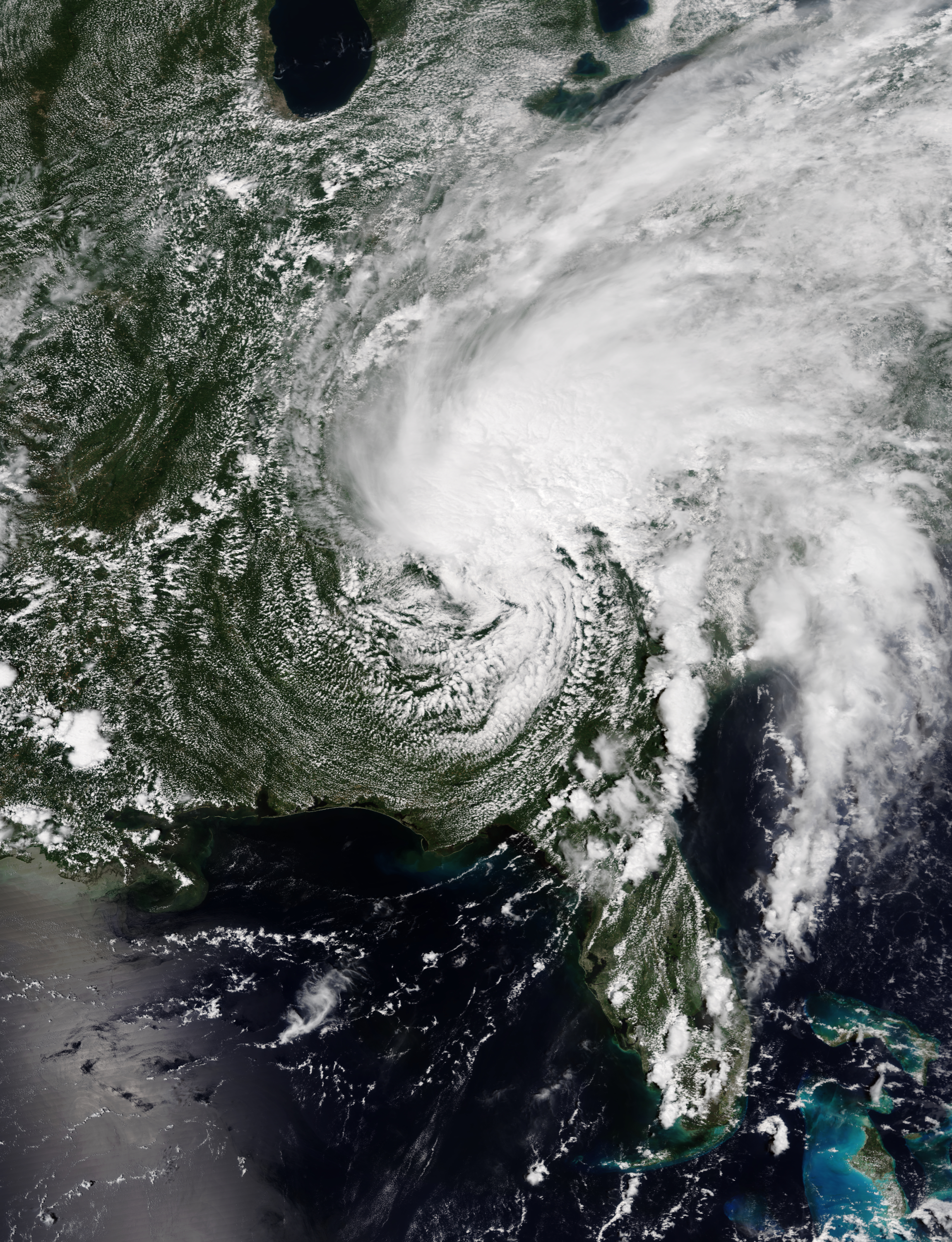
Tropical Depression Fred just east of Atlanta on August 17

As Fred continued to move inland, tornado watches were issued by the National Weather Service for much of Georgia, South Carolina, and North Carolina. There were 16 reports of tornadoes across the three states, while at least six of them were observed across Georgia, including but not limited to an EF1 tornado which touched down in Americus and damaged at least 100 homes and an apartment complex. An unconfirmed tornado hit Jeffersonville and ripped the roof off of a sports goods warehouse, while an EF1 tornado also destroyed a mobile home in Banks County northeast of Atlanta. A horse stable in Homer was destroyed by the same tornado, with the horses being rescued. Metro Atlanta received around 2 inches (51 mm) of rain in hours. A large tree was uprooted and fell on top of a home and hit a gas line in Atlanta, causing Georgia Power crews, Atlanta Gas Light crews and firefighters to rush to the scene. Atlanta recorded nearly 3 inches of rain overnight, a record amount of rainfall for mid-August. Major flooding hit areas along Interstate 85 in Georgia.

==== North Carolina and South Carolina ====
Around 39,200 users of Duke Energy in the Carolinas lost electricity as trees across the state were knocked down while Fred moved north. Even before Fred, some areas had as much as six inches of rain in three days, so the ground was saturated. Fred caused record-breaking flooding in some portions of western North Carolina, with Asheville receiving over 10 inches (250 mm) of rain in a 48-hour period, leading to the issuance of a flash flood emergency. Residents in the nearby town of Swannanoa were asked to shelter-in-place due to the flash flooding. Among the worst-hit areas, some homes were completely destroyed and several roads and bridges washed out. River water levels were estimated to have swelled anywhere from 3 to 7 feet (0.9 to 2.1 m) higher than usual. Mudslides blocked portions of Interstate 40 in Haywood County as well as other roads across western North Carolina. Weather radar estimated that 10 to 12 inches of rain fell over the Pisgah National Forest area; nearby, in Cruso, 9.13 inches of rain was recorded within 24 hours. Buncombe County recorded its worst two-day rainfall event in 50 years from August 16–17. North Carolina Emergency Management deployed water rescue teams, while National Guard and Highway Patrol helicopters began searches around the same time. Over 200 search and rescue personnel went house-to-house checking for survivors along the Pigeon River. Several homes were ripped off their foundations and destroyed, a sheriff from the Haywood Counfy Sheriff Department noted. The Pigeon River swelled 19.6 feet (6.0 meters) higher than usual and suffered its worst flooding recorded, higher than the floods caused by Hurricane Ivan in 2004. Central Haywood High School was deemed inoperable after flooding, forcing students to revert to remote learning. In Cruso, North Carolina, 6 people died due to severe flooding in the region, the final missing individual's body being recovered on August 27. According to Haywood County Board of Commissioners chair Kevin Ensley, the community had $300 million in damage with 225 structures destroyed; Clyde had $18 million in damage. 687 homes in the county had some damage, and 20 NC DOT bridges were damaged and three destroyed. Pisgah High School in Canton had significant damage to its athletic fields, especially the football stadium, and had to play home football games elsewhere. Overall, US$11 million in damages was calculated in Transylvania County.

A tornado was observed near the Hiddenite-Stony Point, North Carolina area. Another tornado was reported in Iredell County, North Carolina near Statesville. A funnel cloud was spotted near Drexel, North Carolina where power was reported to be out in the nearby town of Valdese. A confirmed tornado also hit Lake Murray, South Carolina, downing power lines and trees. Governor Roy Cooper issued a state of emergency for North Carolina on August 18.

The Greenville, South Carolina area experienced a record number of tornado warnings on August 17. Thirty-six warnings were issued on that day.

==== Northeast ====
The remnants of Fred spawned six tornadoes in Pennsylvania. An EF1 tornado touched down in Tilden Township in Berks County around 9 p.m. on August 18. At about 12:30 am on August 19, an EF1 tornado touched down from Souderton in Montgomery County to the area of Silverdale and Perkasie in Bucks County. Three more weak tornadoes touched down in New Jersey, Connecticut, and Massachusetts. Unrelated to tornadoes, parts of the Lehigh Valley saw over 4 inches (100 mm) of rain, while Syracuse, New York recorded 4.90 inches (124 mm) of rain. Flooding in northern Pennsylvania forced the Leonard Harrison State Park to temporarily close following the storm. Heavy rain in Steuben County, New York triggered a flash flood emergency to be issued, requiring over 100 people to be rescued. Over 2,000 customers lost power in Connecticut, where rainfall totals reached over 5 in (130 mm) in portions of the state.

== See also ==
- Weather of 2021
- Tropical cyclones in 2021
- Other storms of the same name
- Tropical Storm Alberto (1994) – struck the Florida Panhandle and caused severe flooding in Georgia
- Hurricane Georges (1998) – took a nearly identical track through the Caribbean as a hurricane
- Tropical Storm Helene (2000) – took a similar track and caused similar flooding and tornadoes in Georgia and the Carolinas
- Hurricane Michael (2018) – A powerful Category 5 hurricane that caused catastrophic damage in the Florida panhandle
- Hurricane Elsa (2021) – took a similar track and hit a similar area of Florida around a month prior
- Hurricane Debby (2024) – took a similar track and caused severe flooding in Florida
- Hurricane Helene (2024) – an extremely large category 4 hurricane that had highly catastrophic impacts in the southeastern US, especially western North Carolina
- List of costliest Atlantic hurricanes
