= James M. Gwyn House =

Historic house in North Carolina, United States

- U.S. National Register of Historic Places
- Location within North Carolina Location within the United States
- Location: NC 276, near Cruso, North Carolina
- Coordinates: 35°26′48″N 82°48′59″W
- Area: 6.6 acres (2.7 ha)
- Built: c. 1888
- Built by: Gwyn, James M.
- Architectural style: Italianate
- NRHP reference No.: 84002335
- Added to NRHP: July 12, 1984

James M. Gwyn House, also known as Springdale, is a historic home located near Cruso, Haywood County, North Carolina. It was built about 1888, and is a boxy two-story, three-bay, center-hall frame structure sheathed in weatherboard. The house is embellished with details derived from the Italianate and Eastlake movement styles. It features a wraparound porch.

It was listed on the National Register of Historic Places in 1984.
