= Haywood County Courthouse (North Carolina) =

- U.S. National Register of Historic Places
- U.S. Historic district – Contributing property
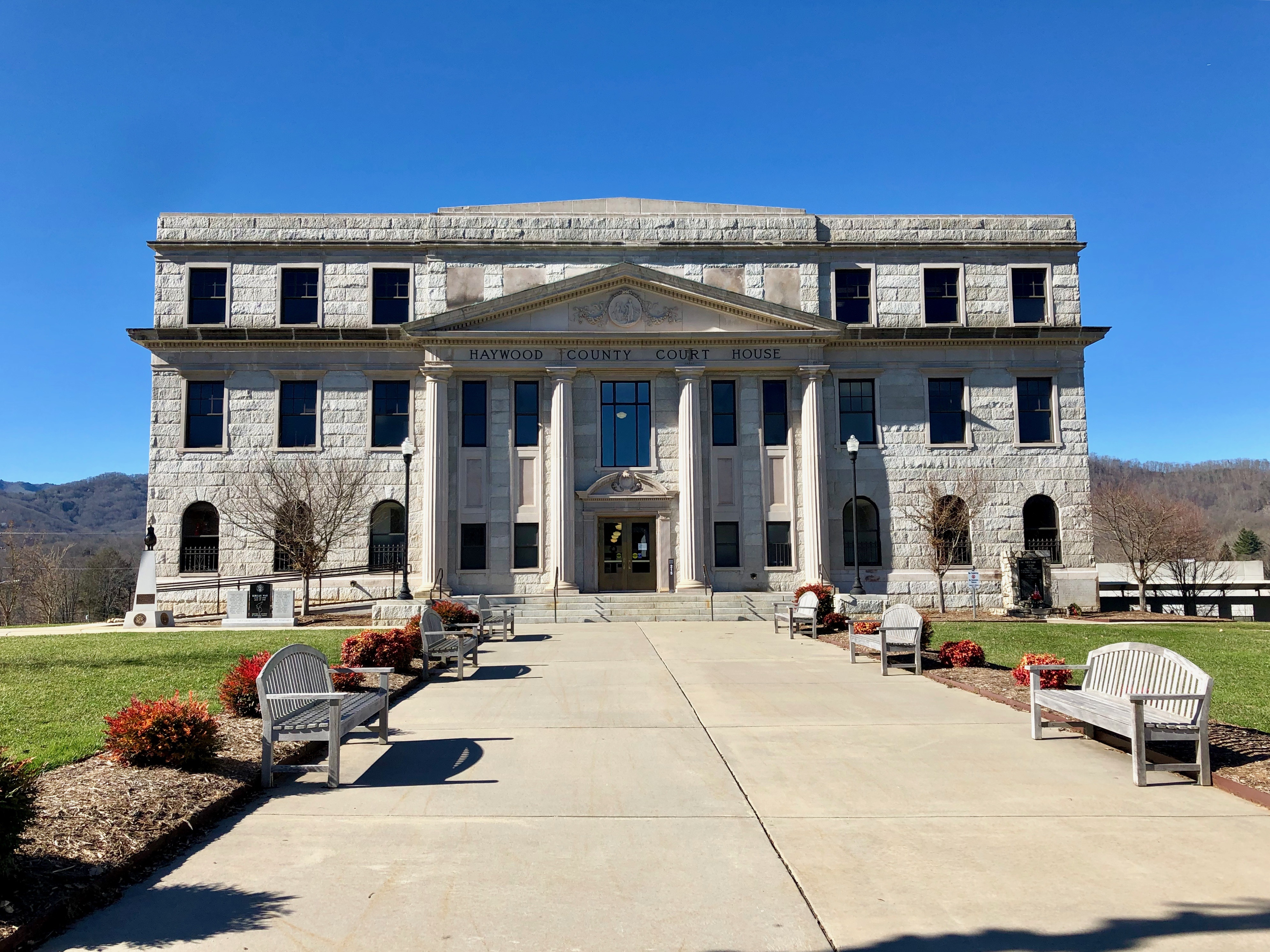
- Haywood County Courthouse, January 2019

- Location within North Carolina Location within the United States
- Location: Main and Depot Sts., Waynesville, North Carolina
- Coordinates: 35°29′33″N 82°59′14″W
- Area: 2 acres (0.81 ha)
- Built: 1932
- Architect: Rogers, William G., & Rhodes, George N
- Architectural style: Classical Revival
- MPS: North Carolina County Courthouses TR
- NRHP reference No.: 79001721
- Added to NRHP: May 10, 1979

Haywood County Courthouse is a historic courthouse building located at Waynesville, Haywood County, North Carolina. It was built in 1932, and is a three-story, ashlar stone veneered rectangular building in the Classical Revival style. It features a slightly projecting entrance pavilion with a pedimented frontispiece resting on four engaged Doric order columns.

It was listed on the National Register of Historic Places in 1979. It is located in the Waynesville Main Street Historic District.
