= Dr. J. Howell Way House =

Historic house in North Carolina, United States

- U.S. National Register of Historic Places
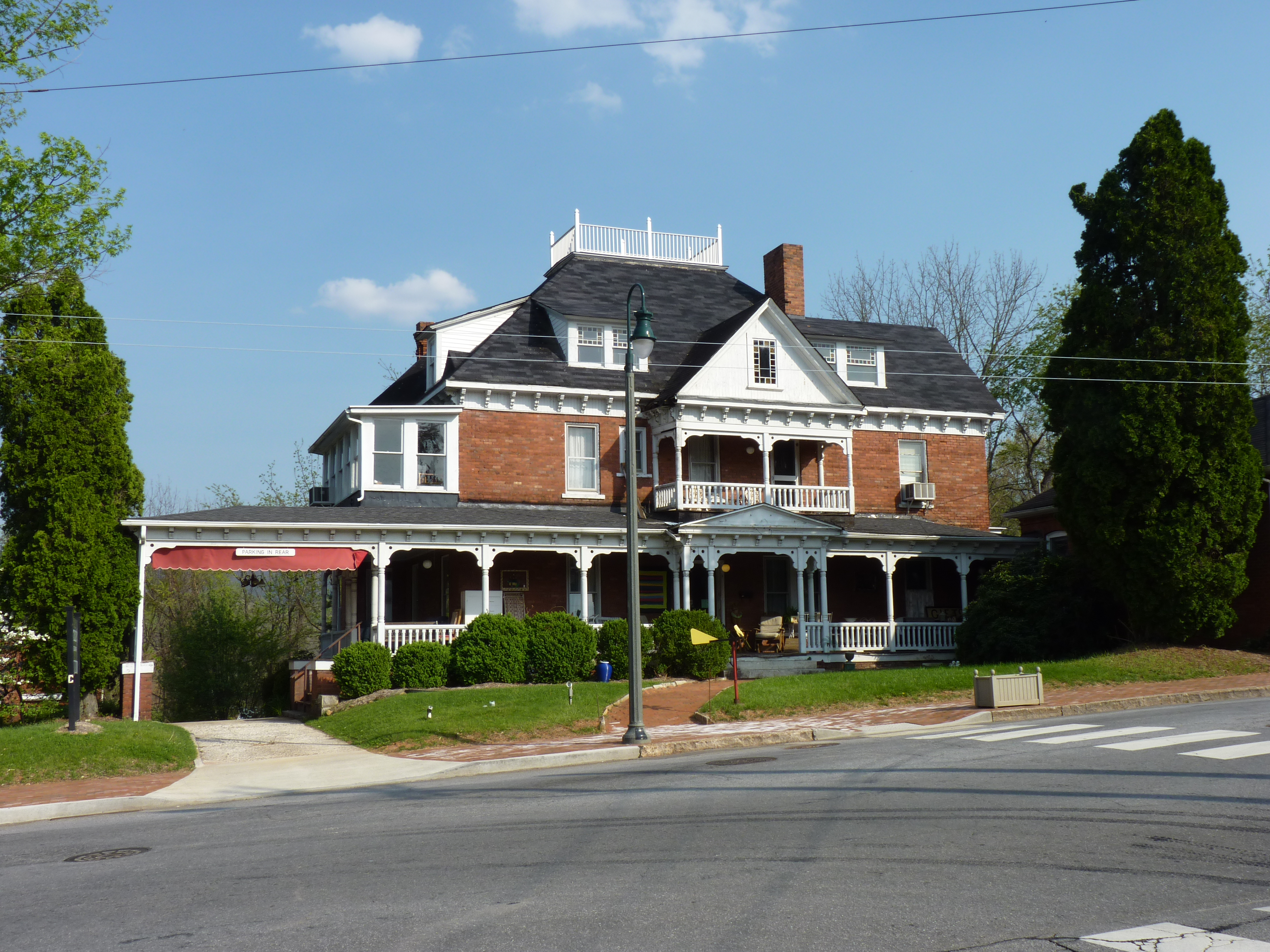
- Dr. J. Howell Way House, April 2011

- Location within North Carolina Location within the United States
- Location: 301 S. Main St., Waynesville, North Carolina
- Coordinates: 35°29′16″N 82°59′21″W
- Area: 1.5 acres (0.61 ha)
- Built: 1899
- Architectural style: Colonial Revival, Queen Anne
- NRHP reference No.: 80002846
- Added to NRHP: September 11, 1980

Dr. J. Howell Way House is a historic home located at the south end of Main Street Waynesville, Haywood County, North Carolina. The brick home was once a modest smaller brick home owned by the Welch family, relatives of Robert love the father of Waynesville. The original home pre dates the civil war and parts of the current structure dates to before the war. In 1888 Dr. J. Howell Way, a prominent physician, married Marietta Welch and in 1894 the small home was acquired, along with an 11-acre tract of land. Soon after dr. Way built a medical office and by 1899 had completed one of the areas most distinguished homes. The home is a large 3 1/2-story brick dwelling retaining a lot of the woodwork, large carved fireplaces, and grand staircase with Queen Anne and Colonial Revival style design elements. It also features a full attic and widow's walk on the very top of the structure. It has a complex roof system composed of a broad hip broken with projecting gables and shed dormers; a one-story, hip roof front wraparound porch and second floor balcony; porte-cochère, and a projecting three-sided, two story bay. Also on the property are the contributing medical office and carriage house.

It was listed on the National Register of Historic Places in 1980.
