= Masonic Hall (Waynesville, North Carolina) =

Historic building in North Carolina, US

- U.S. National Register of Historic Places
- U.S. Historic district – Contributing property
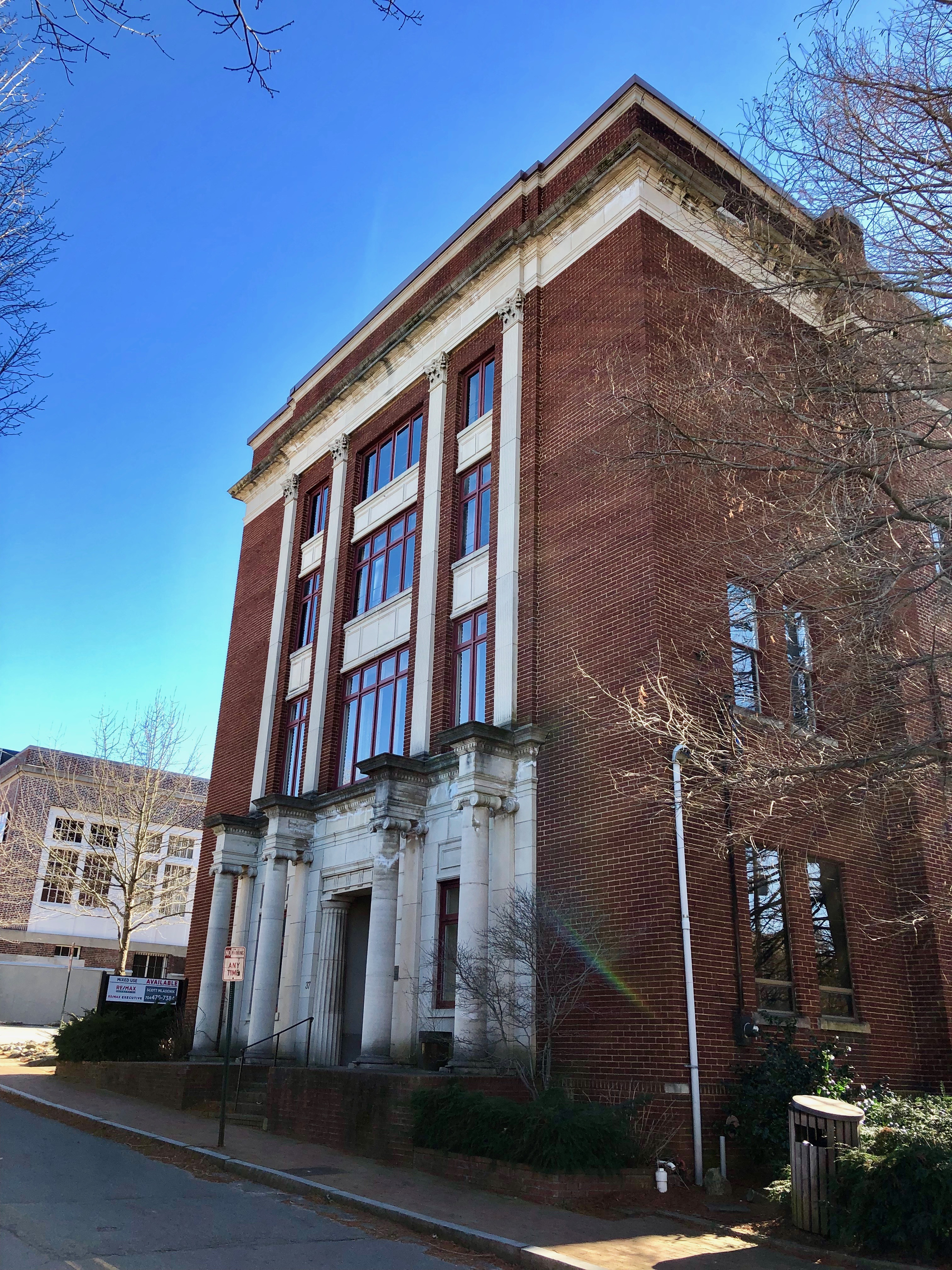
- Old Waynesville Masonic Hall, January 2019

- Location within North Carolina Location within the United States
- Location: 37 Church St., Waynesville, North Carolina
- Coordinates: 35°29′23″N 82°59′20″W
- Area: 0.2 acres (0.081 ha)
- Built: 1927
- Architect: Peeps, W.H.; Phillips, W.C.
- Architectural style: Classical Revival
- Part of: Waynesville Main Street Historic District
- NRHP reference No.: 88000729
- Added to NRHP: June 9, 1988

The Masonic Hall in Waynesville, North Carolina is a historic Masonic Lodge constructed in 1927 as a meeting hall for a local area Masonic Lodge.

It was listed on the National Register of Historic Places in 1988.

It is a three-story, Classical Revival-style steel frame and brick building. The Masons lost the building through bankruptcy in 1930. The building was renovated in 1973.

It is also a contributing building in the Waynesville Main Street Historic District.

At a later date it was a private club and catering venue named "Gateway Club".

Haywood County Register of Deeds records show that on April 12, 2019, Mandir Street LLC purchased the building for an estimated $885,000. The company, owned by Shan Arora and Satish Shah and named for a Hindi word that refers to the Church Street address, planned to use the building in a similar manner to the Gateway Club while respecting the history.

The Scotsman Public House, an award-winning Celtic pub, now operates the 1st Floor. The Three Seven is now a meeting and venue space offering Suites on the second floor with offices for professional meetings, and the Grand Ballroom on the third floor.
