= Clyde H. Ray Sr. House =

Historic house in North Carolina, United States

- U.S. National Register of Historic Places
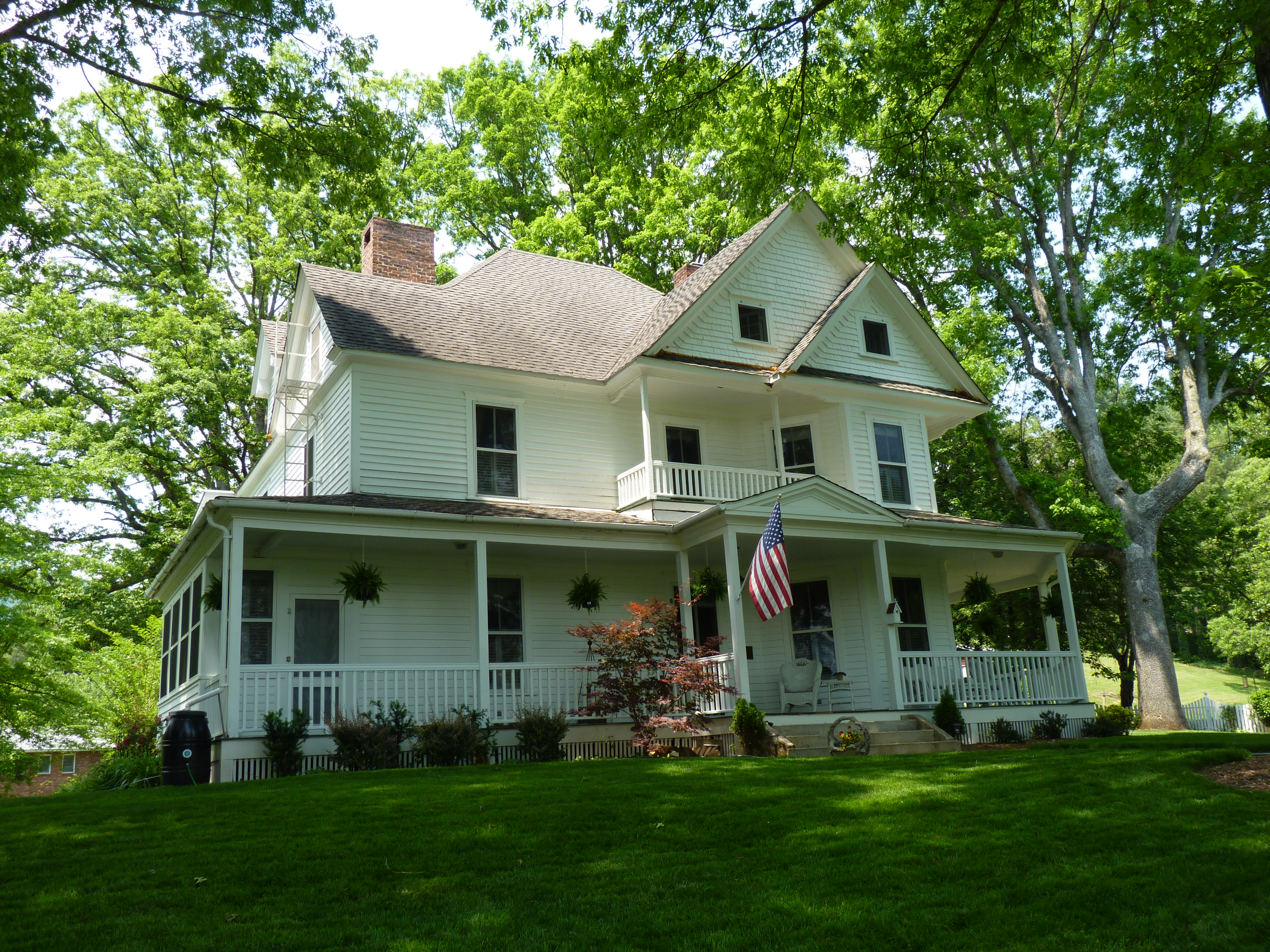
- Clyde H. Ray Sr. House, May 2011

- Location within North Carolina Location within the United States
- Location: 803 1/2 Love Ln., Waynesville, North Carolina
- Coordinates: 35°29′49″N 82°59′32″W
- Area: 1 acre (0.40 ha)
- Built: 1898-1900
- Built by: Rhinehart Bros. Construction
- Architectural style: Queen Anne, Colonial Revival
- NRHP reference No.: 96001089
- Added to NRHP: October 22, 1996

Clyde H. Ray Sr. House, also known as Ten Oaks and Breese House, is a historic home located at Waynesville, Haywood County, North Carolina. It was built in 1901–1902, and is a 2 1/2-story, Colonial Revival style frame dwelling with Queen Anne style design elements. It is sheathed in weatherboard and has a multi-gabled and hipped roof and two interior end brick chimneys. Also on the property is a contributing spring house.

It was listed on the National Register of Historic Places in 2005.
