= Robert Love (soldier) =

American military figure and politician

Robert Love (11 May 1760 – 17 July 1845) was an American Revolutionary War soldier from Virginia and a political leader in North Carolina.

Love was born near the Tinkling Springs Church in Augusta County, Virginia, the son of Samuel and Dorcas Love. In 1776, he entered military service in the Virginia militia from what is now Wythe County, Virginia, and saw action primarily in the backcountry. In 1776, he served in Colonel William Christian's expedition against the Cherokees. In later expeditions he served under such notable leaders as William Campbell and Andrew Pickens.

After the Revolution and with his parents being dead, he moved to what was then Washington County, North Carolina but is now part of Tennessee. About one year later, in 1782 he married Mary Ann Dillard, the daughter of Col. Thomas Dillard of Virginia. Love represented Washington County in the North Carolina Legislature in 1789. Love moved to Buncombe County, North Carolina, in 1792 and was elected to the North Carolina State Senate.

Love was a duellist. Around 1790, he won a horse race against future U.S. President Andrew Jackson by getting Jackson's jockey drunk. When Love and Jackson began a shouting match, Love challenged Jackson to a duel. Jackson declined to duel for the last time in his life.

A wealthy man, in 1809 Love donated land in Haywood County, North Carolina, for a courthouse, jail and town square and formed Mount Prospect which was renamed Waynesville, North Carolina, after General Anthony Wayne. Love helped to establish the final state boundary line between North Carolina and Tennessee in 1821.

Presidential Elector (DR-NC) 1808, 1816, 1820; (People's-NC) 1824, (D-NC) 1828, 1832. He was nominated for Presidential Elector in 1816 in the first political convention held in North Carolina history. Tied for the longest service as Presidential Elector in NC. Elected to serve in 1836 but was unable to attend due to being kicked by a horse; his son James R. Love served in his place.

He died in Waynesville in 1845.
