= Boone-Withers House =

Historic house in North Carolina, United States

- U.S. National Register of Historic Places
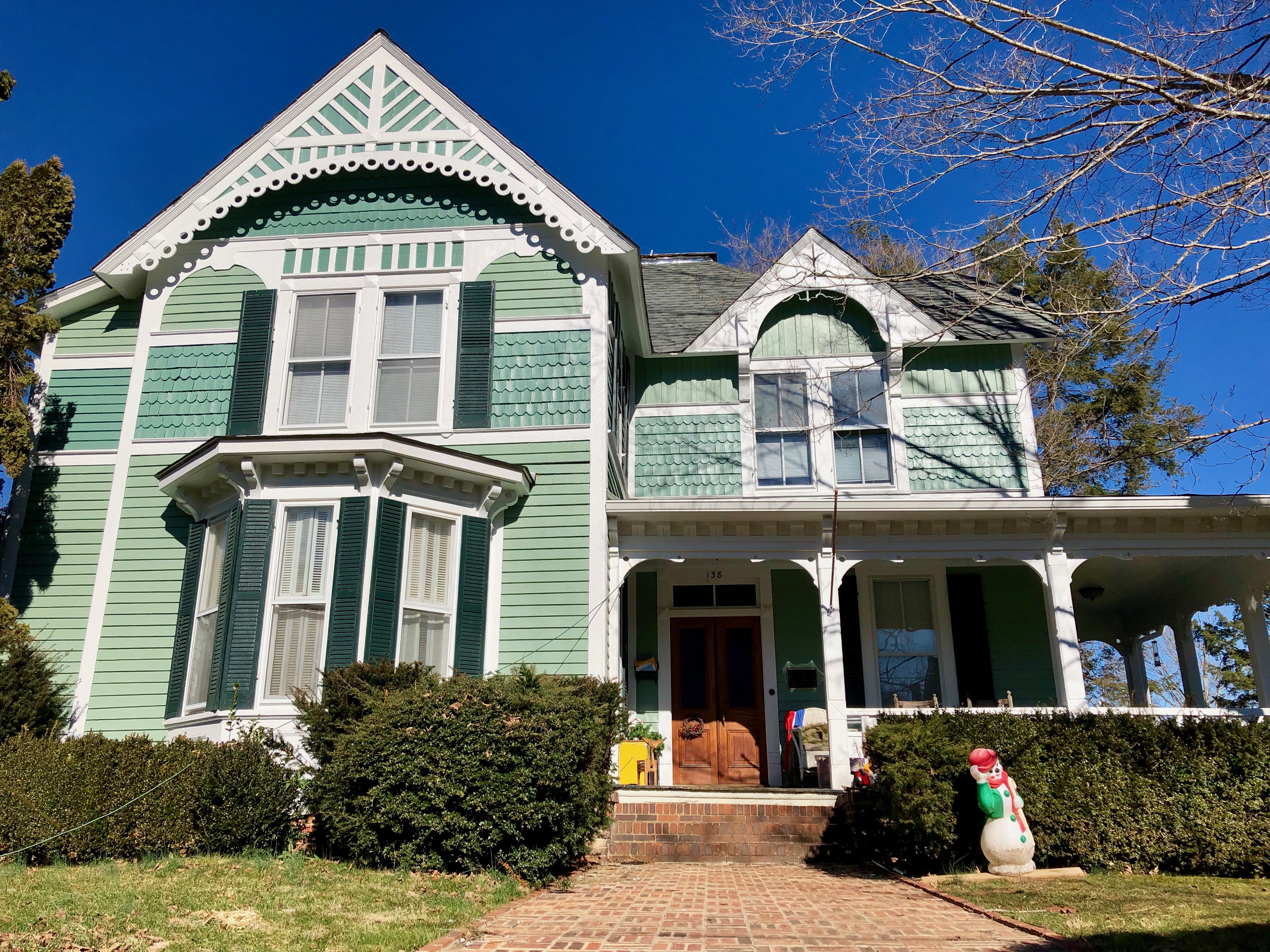
- Boone-Withers House, January 2019

- Location within North Carolina Location within the United States
- Location: 305 Church St., Waynesville, North Carolina
- Coordinates: 35°29′26″N 82°59′25″W
- Area: less than one acre
- Built: c. 1883
- Built by: Sam Liner
- Architect: William H. Lord (1914)
- Architectural style: Late Victorian
- NRHP reference No.: 83001889
- Added to NRHP: July 21, 1983

The Boone-Withers House is a historic home located at Waynesville, Haywood County, North Carolina. It was built about 1883, and is a 2 1/2-story, Late Victorian style frame dwelling. It has a large, two-story gabled wing and three smaller, two-story bays. It features a one-story, hip roofed wraparound porch and two tall chimneys.

The house was built for John Kader Boone by local carpenter Sam Liner. Boone died in 1912. The second owner, James D. Grant, had the house renovated in 1914 from designs by Asheville architect William H. Lord. Grant, a resident of New Orleans, used the house as a summer home. The third owner, Ernest L. Withers, bought the house in 1923. Both Boone and Withers were members of locally-prominent families.

It was listed on the National Register of Historic Places in 1983. The home was restored by Waynesville Historic Preservation Society vice chair Rodney Conard, who also revitalized the Balsam Mountain Inn in 2023.
