= Alden and Thomasene Howell House =

Historic house in North Carolina, United States

- U.S. National Register of Historic Places
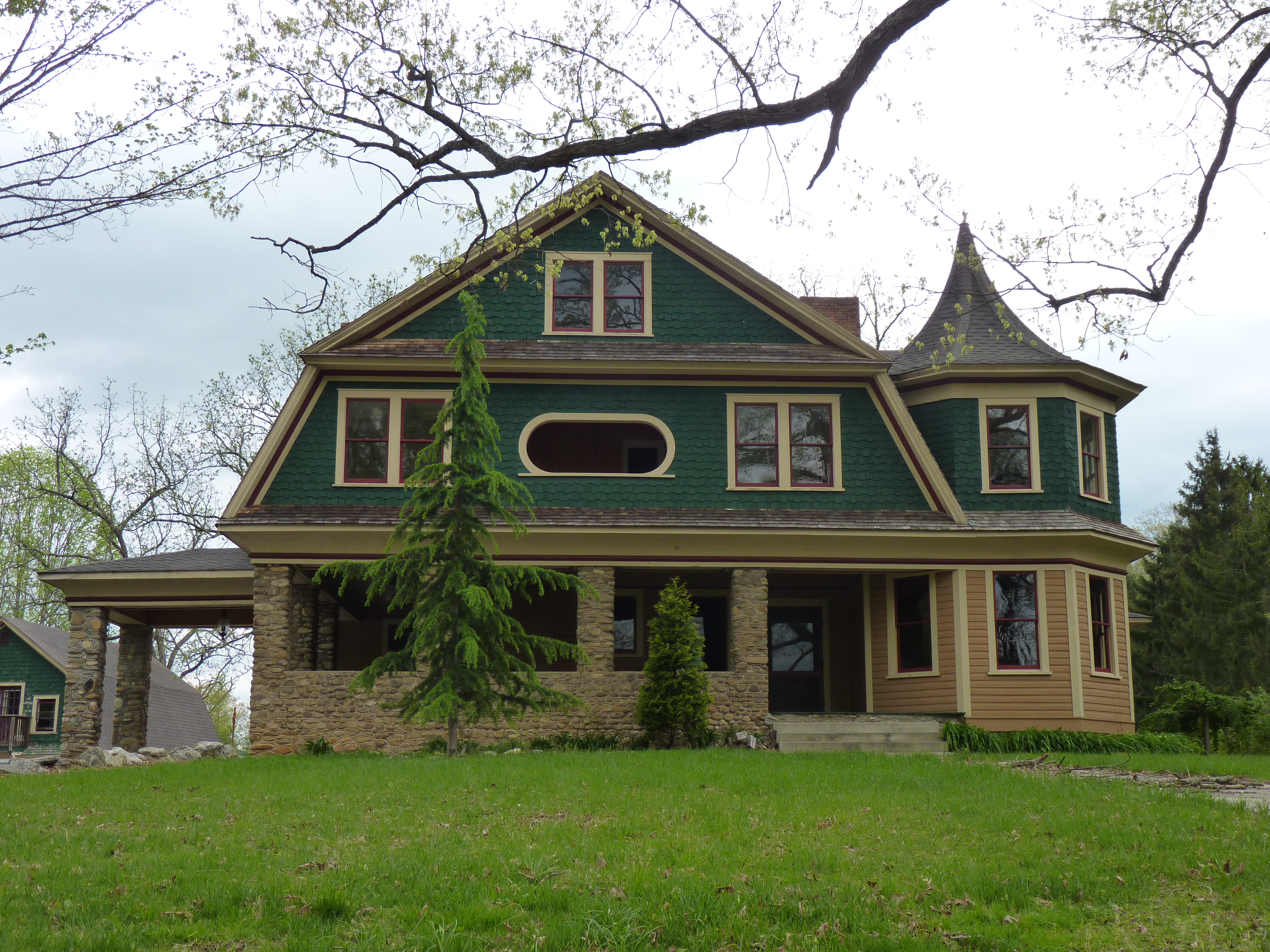
- Alden and Thomasene Howell House, April 2011

- Location within North Carolina Location within the United States
- Location: 129 Woolsey Heights, Waynesville, North Carolina
- Coordinates: 35°29′42″N 82°58′47″W
- Area: 1.4 acres (0.57 ha)
- Built: c. 1905
- Architectural style: Shingle Style
- NRHP reference No.: 03000300
- Added to NRHP: April 22, 2003

Alden and Thomasene Howell House is a historic home located at Waynesville, Haywood County, North Carolina. It was built about 1905, and is a 2 1/2-story, Shingle Style frame dwelling. It features asymn1etrical massing, a cross gambrel roof, wraparound porch with square stone piers and balustrade, a stone porte-cochère, and a corner turret.

It was listed on the National Register of Historic Places in 2003.
