= Patton Farm =

Historic farm in North Carolina, United States

- U.S. National Register of Historic Places
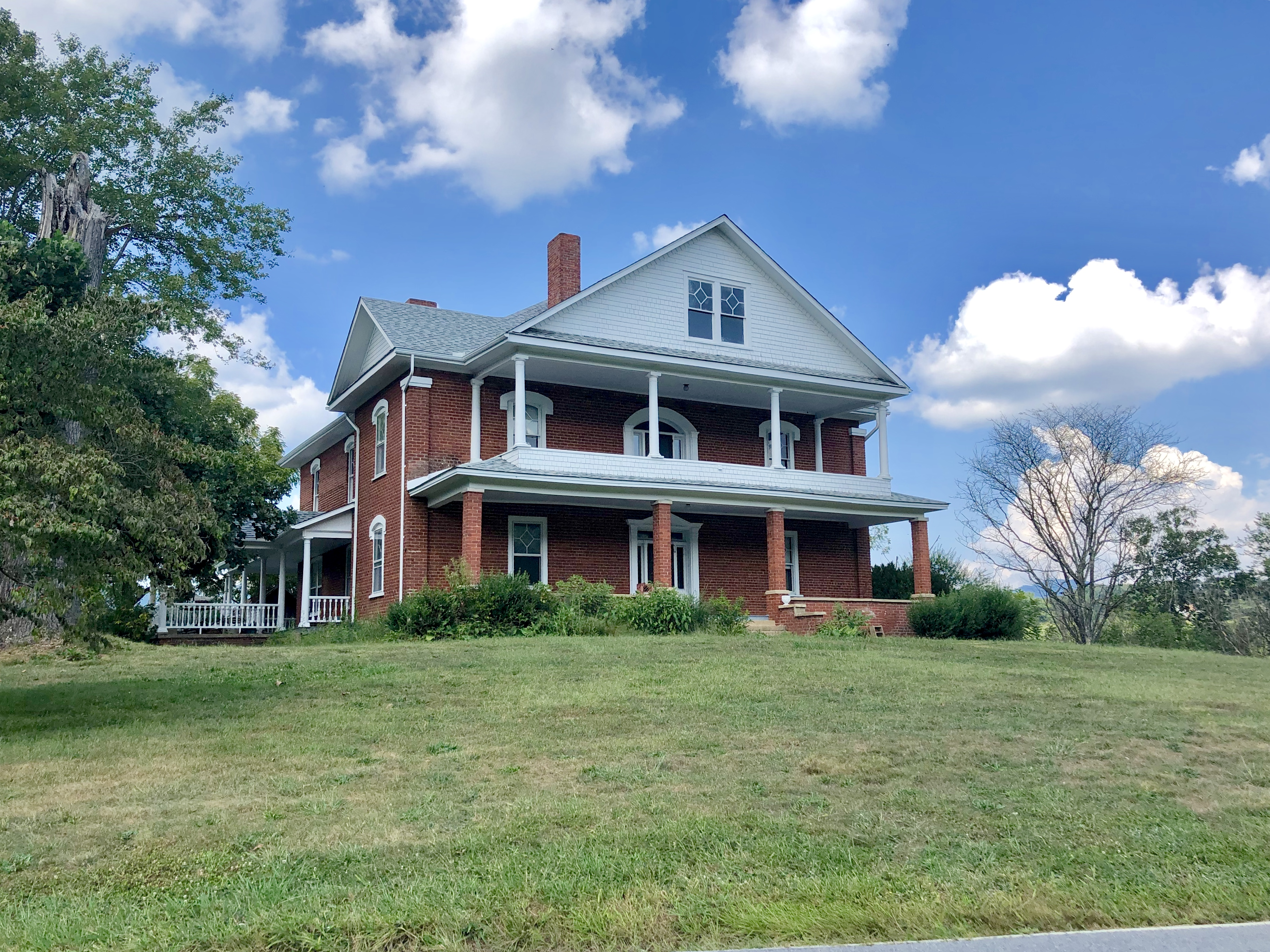
- The Patton Farmhouse

- Location within North Carolina Location within the United States
- Location: SW of Canton, near Phillipsville, North Carolina
- Coordinates: 35°32′20″N 82°52′34″W
- Area: 20 acres (8.1 ha)
- Built: c. 1880
- Architectural style: Italianate
- NRHP reference No.: 80002845
- Added to NRHP: November 10, 1980

Patton Farm is a historic farm complex located near Phillipsville, Haywood County, North Carolina. The farmhouse was built about 1880, and is a two-story, three bay by one bay, brick dwelling with Italianate-style design elements. It has a gable roof and a 2 1/2-story brick rear ell. Also on the property are the contributing gambrel roof barn, a small frame woodshed, a smokehouse, and a small board-and-batten dwelling. The Patton Farm was established about 1830.

It was listed on the National Register of Historic Places in 1980.
