= Charles and Annie Quinlan House =

Historic house in North Carolina, United States

- U.S. National Register of Historic Places
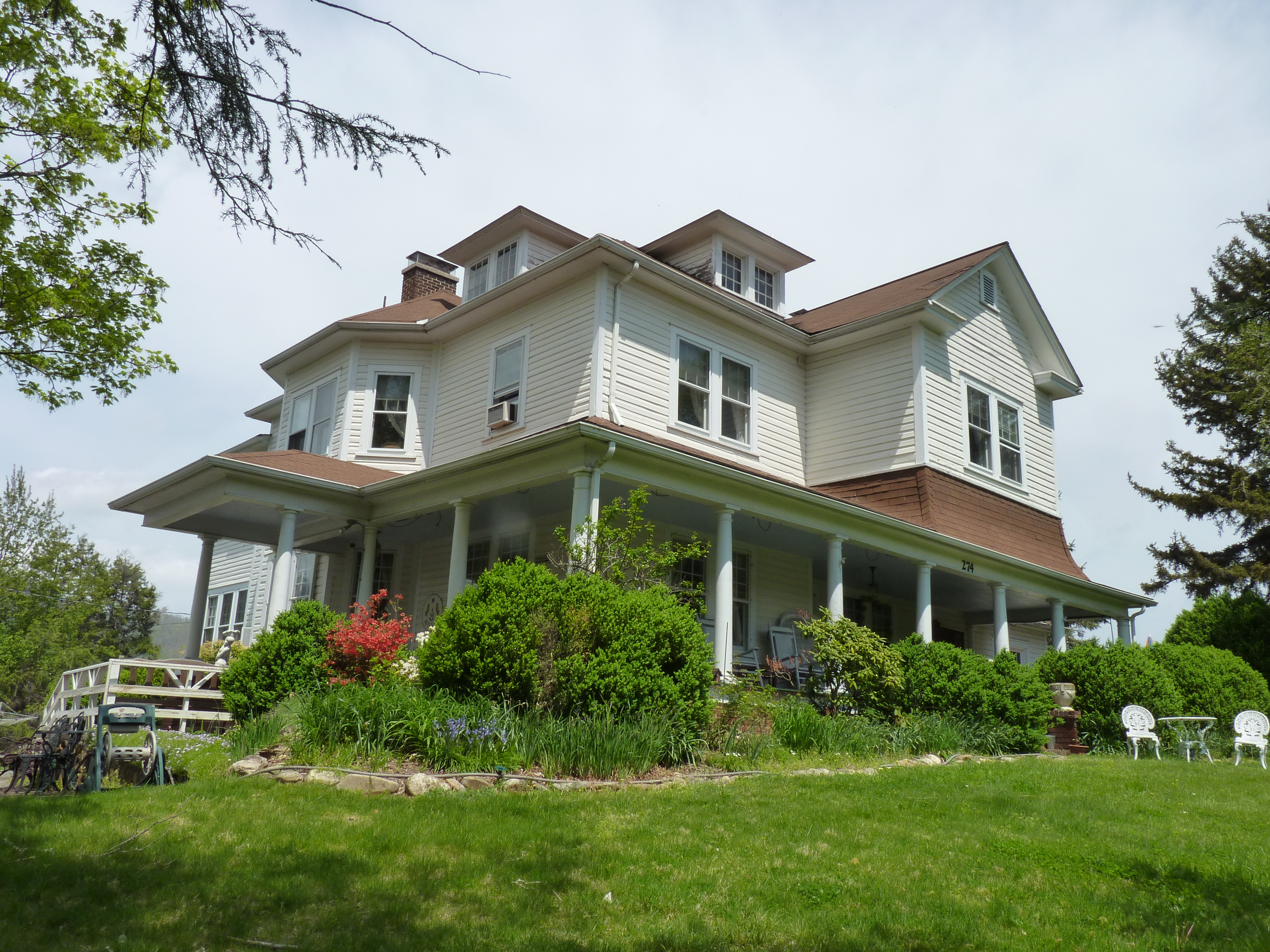
- Charles and Annie Quinlan House, April 2011

- Location within North Carolina Location within the United States
- Location: 274 S. Main St., Waynesville, North Carolina
- Coordinates: 35°29′11″N 82°59′27″W
- Area: 1.1 acres (0.45 ha)
- Built: 1901-1902
- Architectural style: Queen Anne, Colonial Revival
- NRHP reference No.: 05000959
- Added to NRHP: September 7, 2005

Charles and Annie Quinlan House, also known as The Inn on Prospect Hill and Prospect Hill, is a historic home located at Waynesville, Haywood County, North Carolina. It was built in 1901–1902, and is a 2 1/2-story, transitional Queen Anne / Colonial Revival style frame dwelling. It consists of an irregular form core hipped on three sides, gabled on the north, and expanded on all sides with hip-roof wings or bays.

It was listed on the National Register of Historic Places in 2005.
