= Former Citizens Bank and Trust Company Building =

Historic building in North Carolina, US

- U.S. National Register of Historic Places
- U.S. Historic district – Contributing property
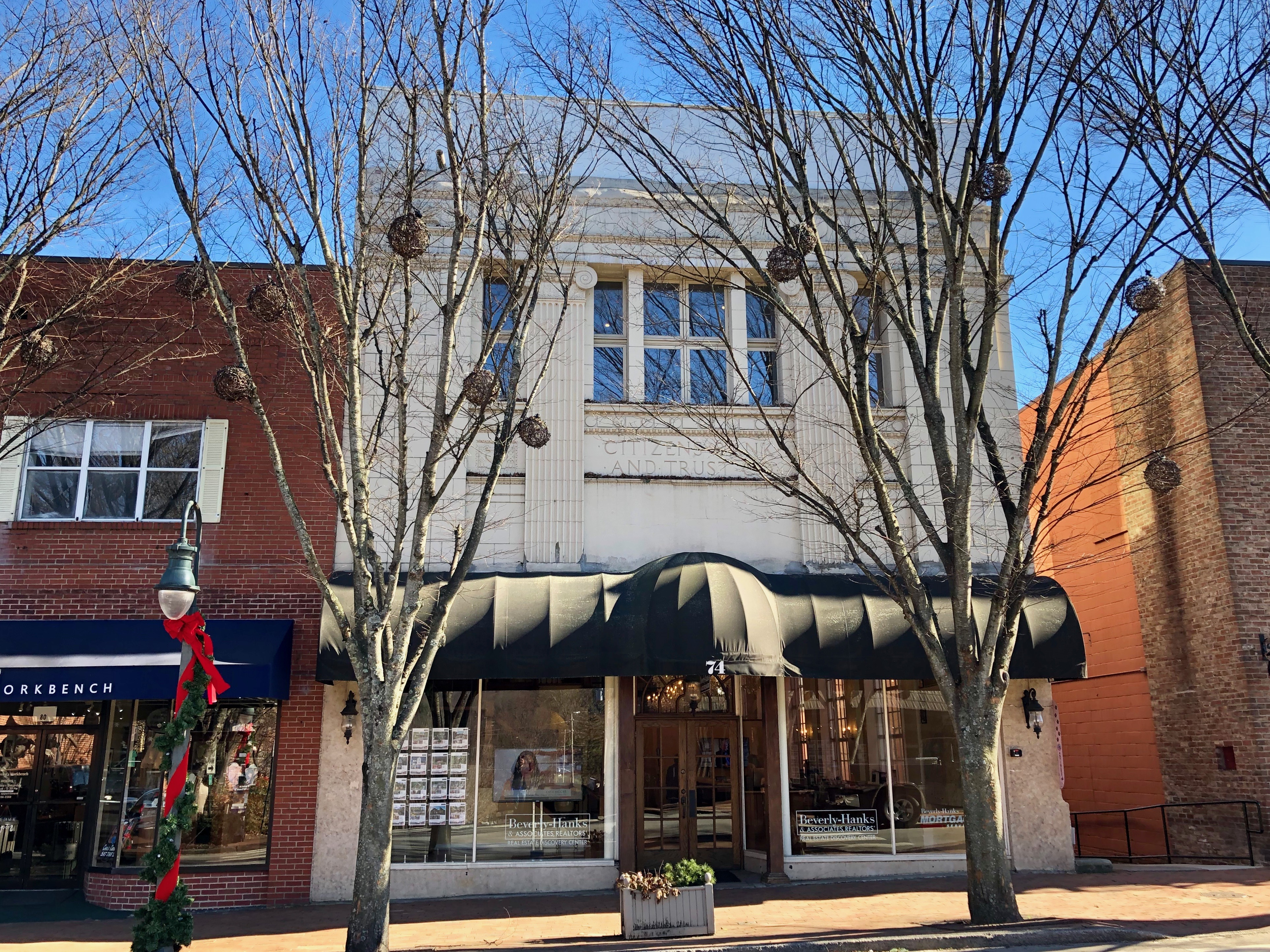
- Former Citizens Bank and Trust Company Building, January 2019

- Location within North Carolina Location within the United States
- Location: 161 N. Main St., Waynesville, North Carolina
- Coordinates: 35°29′27″N 82°59′14″W
- Area: 0.1 acres (0.040 ha)
- Built: 1921
- Architect: Clarence and Decatur Phillips
- Architectural style: Classical Revival
- NRHP reference No.: 91000261
- Added to NRHP: March 14, 1991

The Former Citizens Bank and Trust Company Building is a historic bank building located at Waynesville, Haywood County, North Carolina. It was built in 1921, and is a two-story, brick and marble front rectangular building in the Classical Revival style. It measures 76 feet by 31 feet and features a tall parapet faced with marble block that rises above the cornice. The bank ceased operation in 1932, and the building has since housed retail businesses.

It was listed on the National Register of Historic Places in 1991. It is located in the Waynesville Main Street Historic District.
