= Spread Out Historic District =

Historic house in North Carolina, United States

- U.S. National Register of Historic Places
- U.S. Historic district
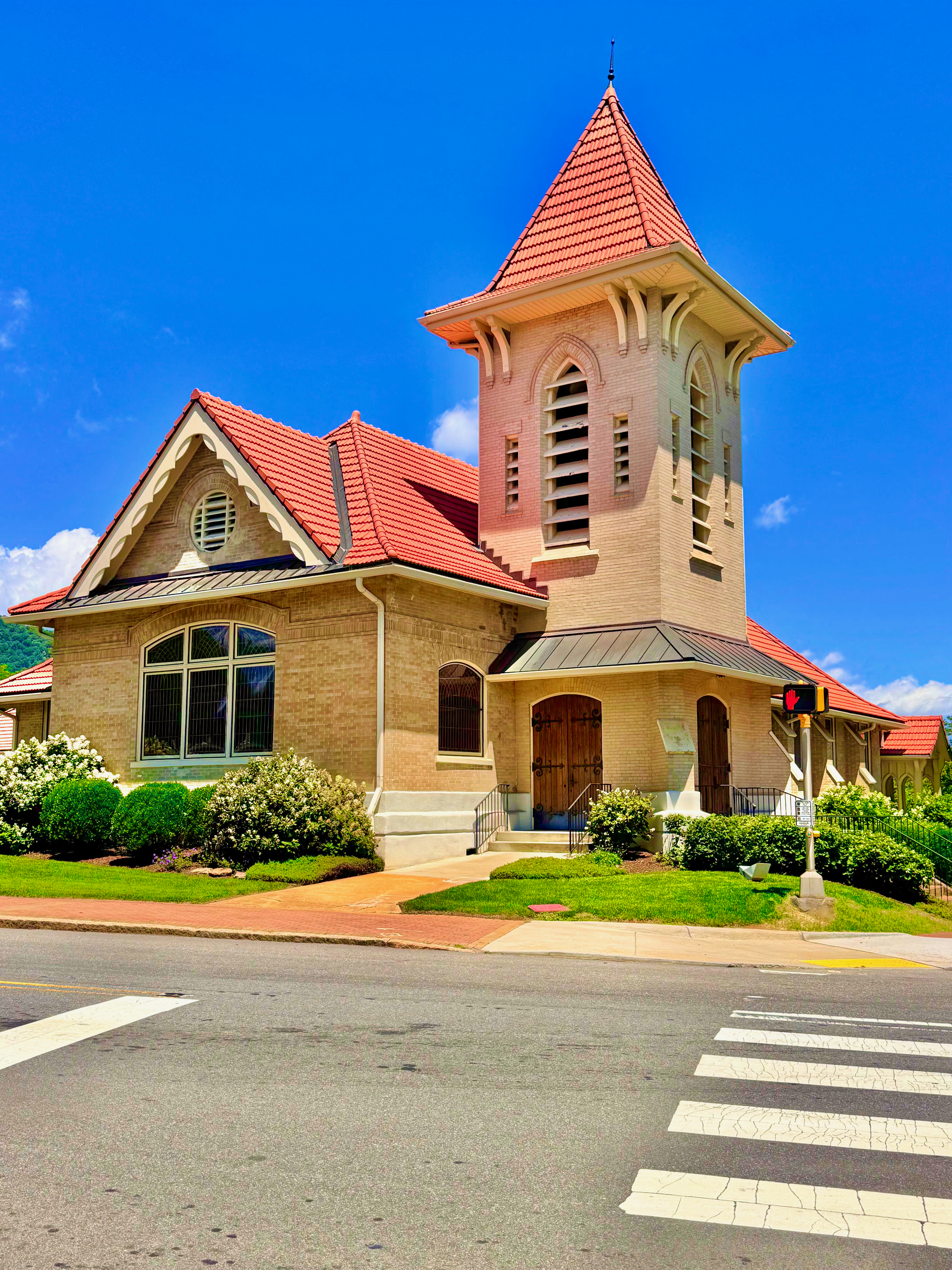
- First Presbyterian Church, A Contributing Structure

- Location within North Carolina Location within the United States
- Location: Roughly bounded by N Main St, Walnut St, and Beech St, Waynesville, North Carolina
- Coordinates: 35°29′51″N 82°58′45″W
- Area: 25 acres (10 ha)
- Built by: D.V. Phillips
- Architectural style: Queen Anne, Colonial Revival, Bungalow / Craftsman
- NRHP reference No.: 10001095
- Added to NRHP: December 28, 2010

Spread Out Historic District, also known as North Waynesville Addition, is a national historic district located at Waynesville, Haywood County, North Carolina. It includes 67 contributing buildings in a predominantly residential section of Waynesville developed between about 1895 and 1958. It includes notable examples of Queen Anne, Colonial Revival, and Bungalow / American Craftsman style architecture. Notable buildings include Waynesville Presbyterian Church (c. 1907) and two late-1920s apartment buildings.

It was listed on the National Register of Historic Places in 2010.
