= Frank Smathers House =

Historic house in North Carolina, United States

- U.S. National Register of Historic Places
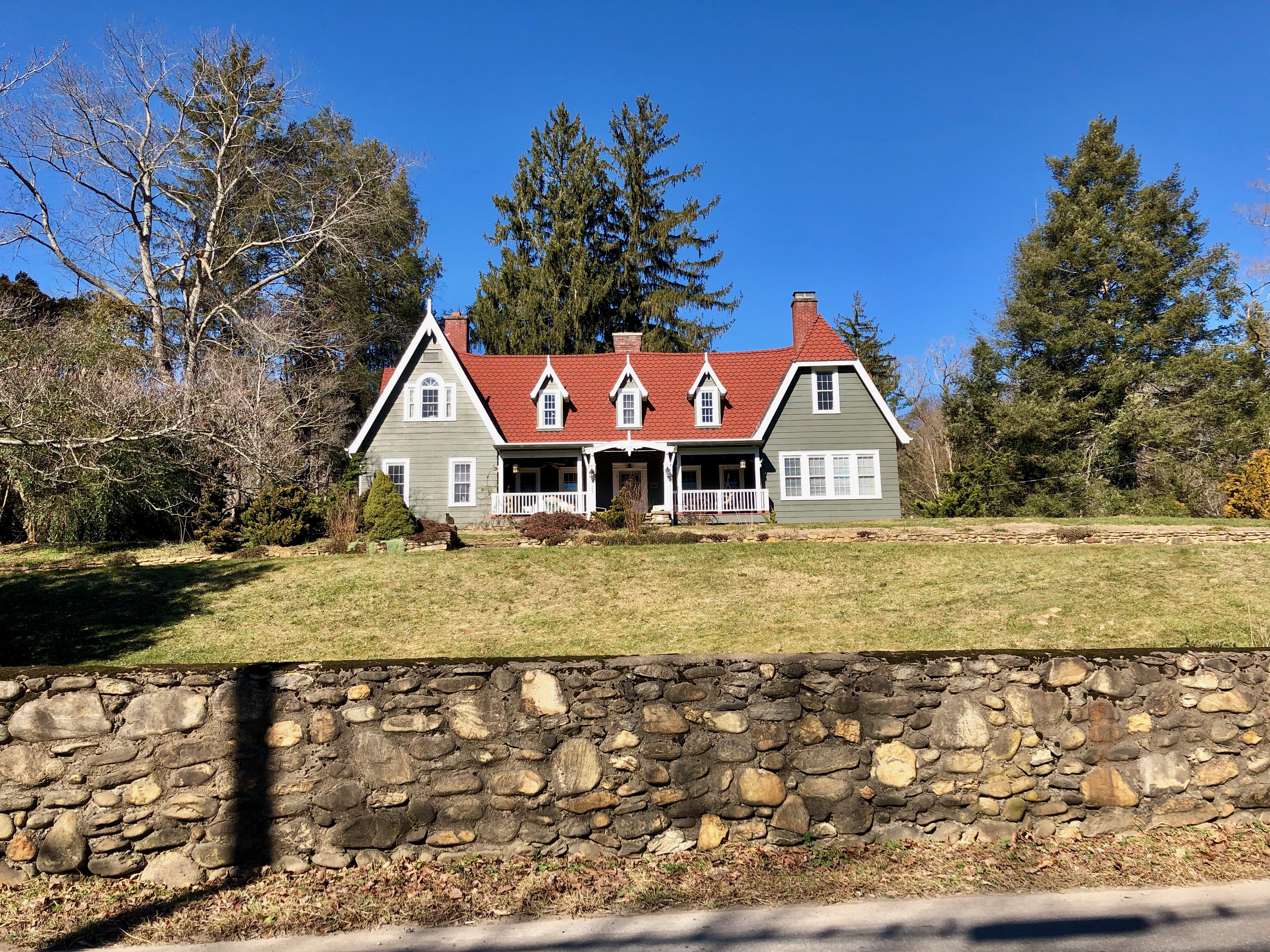
- Frank Smathers House, January 2019

- Location within North Carolina Location within the United States
- Location: 724 Smathers St., Waynesville, North Carolina
- Coordinates: 35°30′24″N 82°58′51″W
- Area: 2.7 acres (1.1 ha)
- Built: 1926
- Architect: DeGarmo, Richard
- Architectural style: Late 19th And 20th Century Revivals
- NRHP reference No.: 98000730
- Added to NRHP: July 10, 1998

Frank Smathers House, also known as The Evergreens, is a historic home located at Waynesville, Haywood County, North Carolina. It was built in 1926, and is a 1 1/2-story, H-shaped, eclectic frame dwelling with Gothic Revival and Colonial Revival style design elements. It features a steeply pitched, cross gable roof with imbricated fish-scale asphalt shingles, brick interior slope chimneys, projecting eaves, and exposed rafters. Also on the property are a contributing barn (c. 1900) and stone retaining wall (1926). It was built as a summer home and family cottage for the Frank Smathers family, who owned the home from 1926 until 1988. U.S. Senator George Smathers (1913-2007), son of Frank Smathers owned the home, followed by Florida Secretary of State, Bruce Smathers, (1943) grandson of Frank Smathers, before being sold outside the family.

It was listed on the National Register of Historic Places in 1998.
