= Francis Grist Mill =

- U.S. National Register of Historic Places
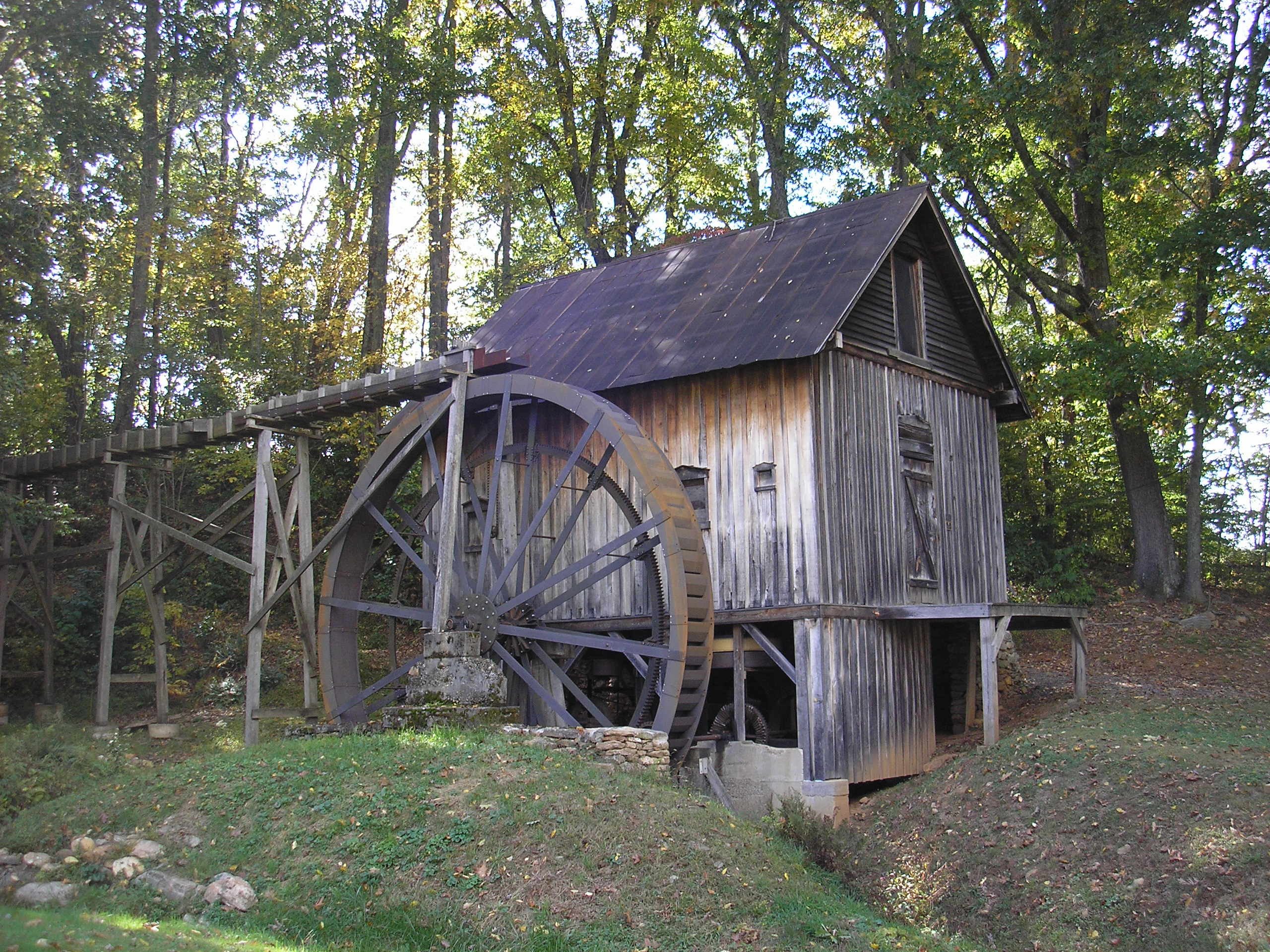
- Francis Grist Mill, October 2014

- Location within North Carolina Location within the United States
- Location: Roughly bounded by N Main St, Walnut St, and Beech St, Waynesville, North Carolina
- Coordinates: 35°28′29″N 82°57′28″W
- Area: 2.5 acres (1.0 ha)
- Built: 1887
- Built by: Francis, William
- NRHP reference No.: 13000228
- Added to NRHP: May 1, 2013

Francis Grist Mill is a historic grist mill located at Waynesville, Haywood County, North Carolina. It was built in 1887, and is a 1 1/2-story, heavy timber frame mill building sheathed in board-and-batten siding. It has an overshot water wheel and (restored) wheel mechanisms, gears and pulleys underneath the main floor. From 2004 to 2008, the mill underwent a successful restoration in order to get the mill functioning again.

It was listed on the National Register of Historic Places in 2013.
