= Waynesville Main Street Historic District (Waynesville, North Carolina) =

Historic district in North Carolina, United States

- U.S. National Register of Historic Places
- U.S. Historic district
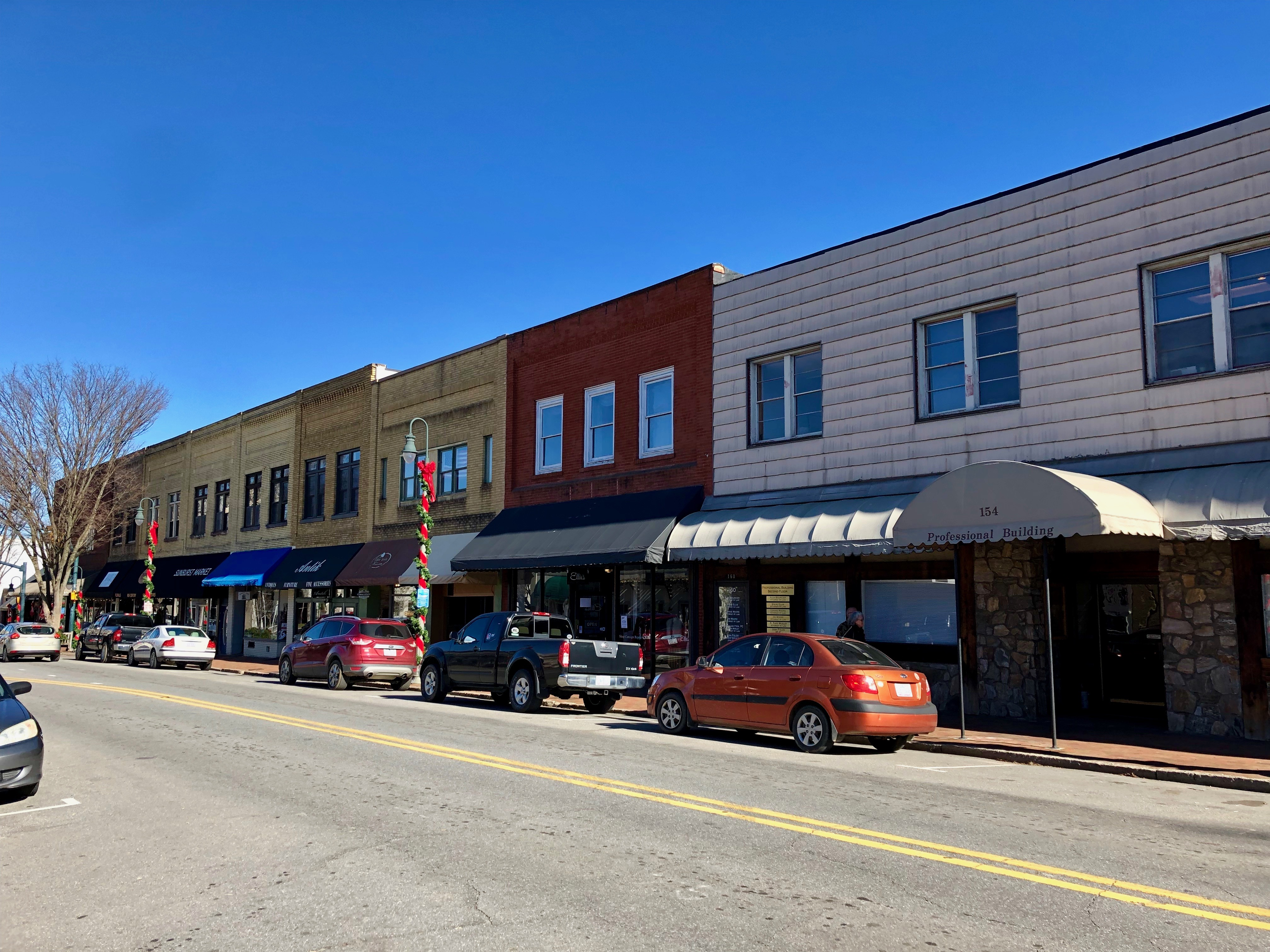
- Main Street in Waynesville, January 2019

- Location within North Carolina Location within the United States
- Location: Roughly bounded by Depot St., Church and E. Sts, Wall St., and Montgomery St., Waynesville, North Carolina
- Coordinates: 35°29′40″N 82°59′26″W
- Area: 13 acres (5.3 ha)
- Architect: Gaines, Henry; et.al.
- Architectural style: Early Commercial, Classical Revival
- NRHP reference No.: 05001414
- Added to NRHP: December 16, 2005

Waynesville Main Street Historic District is a national historic district located at Waynesville, Haywood County, North Carolina. It includes 35 contributing buildings in the central business district of Waynesville. It includes notable examples of Classical Revival style architecture, including the separately listed Waynesville Municipal Building, Citizens Bank and Trust Company Building, Former, Gateway Club, and Haywood County Courthouse. Other notable buildings include Sherrill's Studio (1942), Bank and Library building (1905), and Stringfield Medical Building (c. 1905).

It was listed on the National Register of Historic Places in 2005.
