= Cruso, North Carolina =

- Unincorporated community
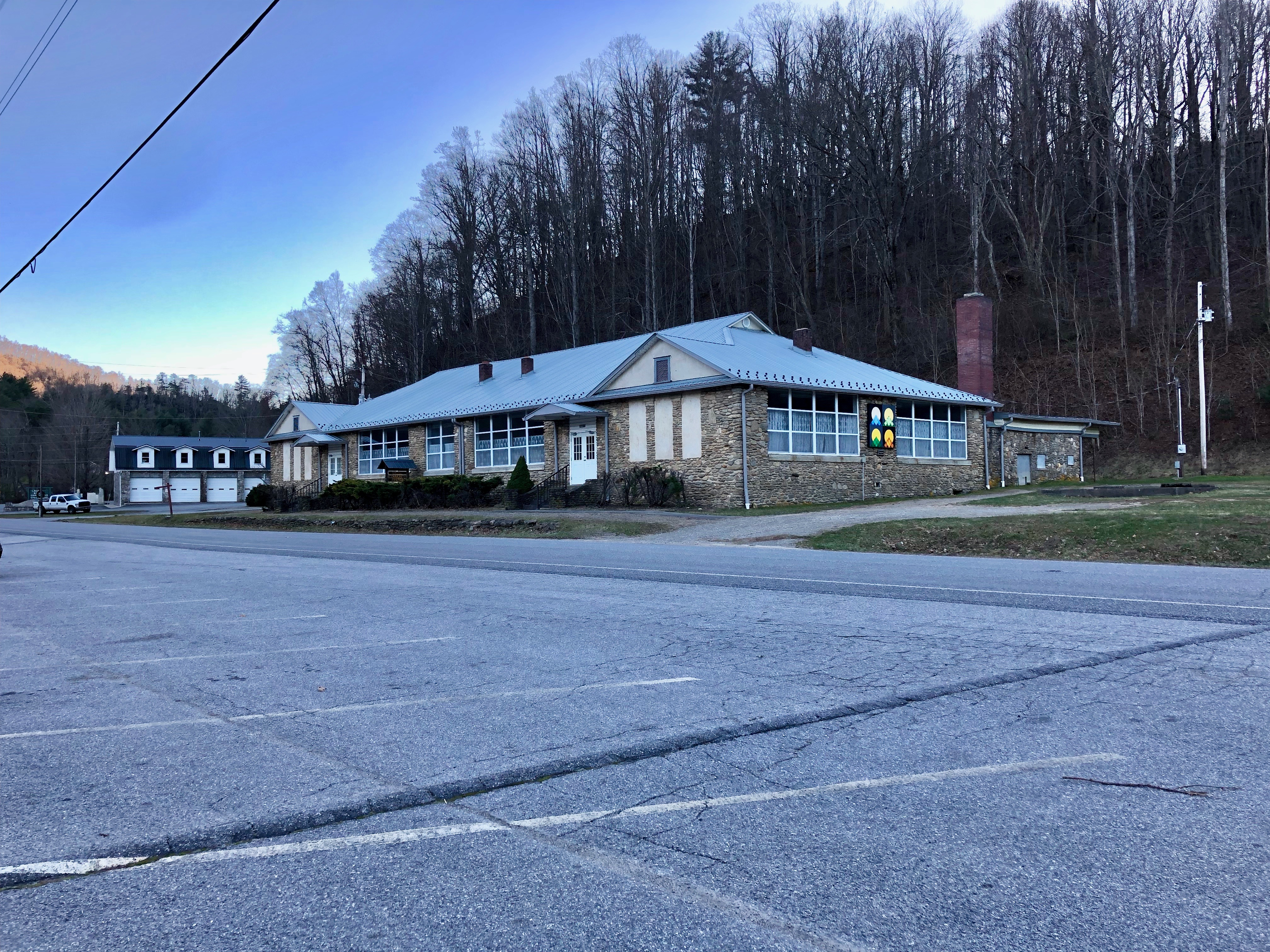
- Old Cruso School

- Location within North Carolina Location within the United States
- Coordinates: 35°25′03″N 82°48′38″W
- Country: United States
- State: North Carolina
- County: Haywood
- Elevation: 2,936 ft (895 m)
- Time zone: UTC-5 (Eastern (EST))
  - Summer (DST): UTC-4 (EDT)
- Area code: 828
- GNIS feature ID: 1019875

Cruso (also Crusoe) is an unincorporated community in Haywood County, North Carolina, United States.

Cruso is near Pisgah National Forest.

== History ==
Prior to European colonization, the area that is now Cruso was inhabited by the Cherokee people and other Indigenous peoples for thousands of years. The Cherokee in Western North Carolina are known as the Eastern Band of Cherokee Indians, a federally recognized tribe.

Cruso was named upon establishment by its first postmaster, who reportedly had just read the novel Robinson Crusoe by Englishman Daniel Defoe.

On August 17, 2021, six people died as a result from flooding from Tropical Storm Fred. As of June 2022, there are still piles of debris in and around Cruso.
