= Waynesville, North Carolina =

- Town
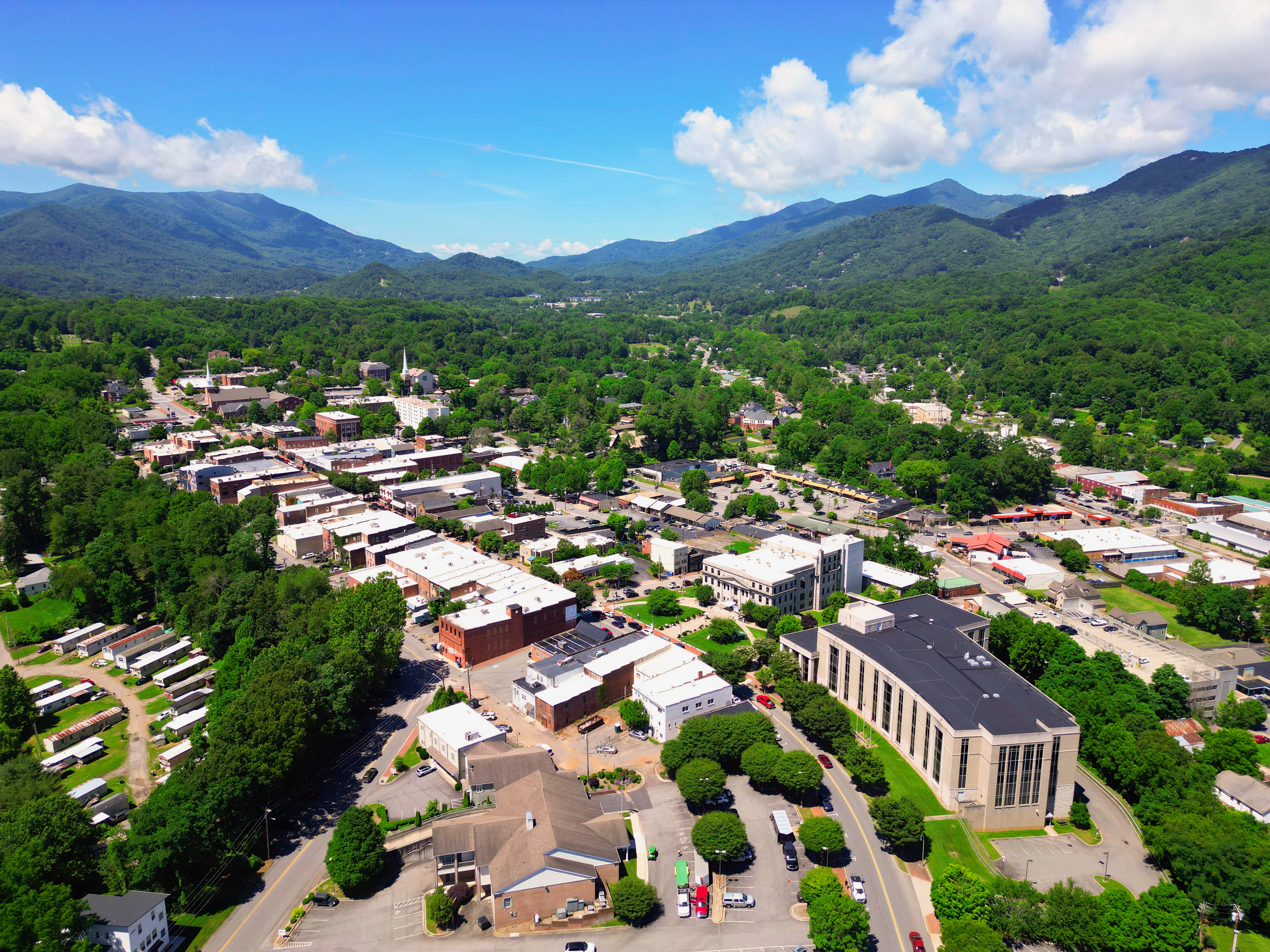
- Aerial view of downtown Waynesville

- Flag Seal
- Motto: "Progress with Vision"
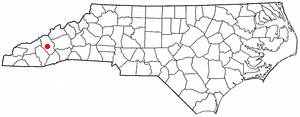
- Location in North Carolina
- Coordinates: 35°29′0″N 82°59′40″W
- Country: United States
- State: North Carolina
- County: Haywood
- Incorporated: 1810

Government
  - Mayor: Gary Caldwell

Area
  - Total: 8.93 sq mi (23.14 km^{2})
  - Land: 8.93 sq mi (23.14 km^{2})
  - Water: 0 sq mi (0.00 km^{2}) 0%
- Elevation: 2,697 ft (822 m)

Population (2020)
  - Total: 10,140
  - Density: 1,134.7/sq mi (438.11/km^{2})
- Time zone: UTC−5 (Eastern)
  - Summer (DST): UTC−4 (EDT)
- ZIP codes: 28738, 28785, 28786
- Area code: 828
- FIPS code: 37-71500
- GNIS feature ID: 2406845
- Website: www.townofwaynesville.org

Waynesville is a town in and the county seat of Haywood County, North Carolina, United States. It is the largest town in North Carolina west of Asheville. Waynesville is located about 30 miles (50 km) southwest of Asheville between the Great Smoky and Blue Ridge Mountains.

As of the 2020 census, Waynesville had a population of 10,140. The town is located just outside the Pisgah National Forest and is close to the Great Smoky Mountains National Park and the Blue Ridge Parkway. Waynesville and Haywood County are part of the four-county Asheville Metropolitan Statistical Area, currently the fifth largest metropolitan area in North Carolina. It is the third largest town in the MSA behind the cities of Asheville and Hendersonville.

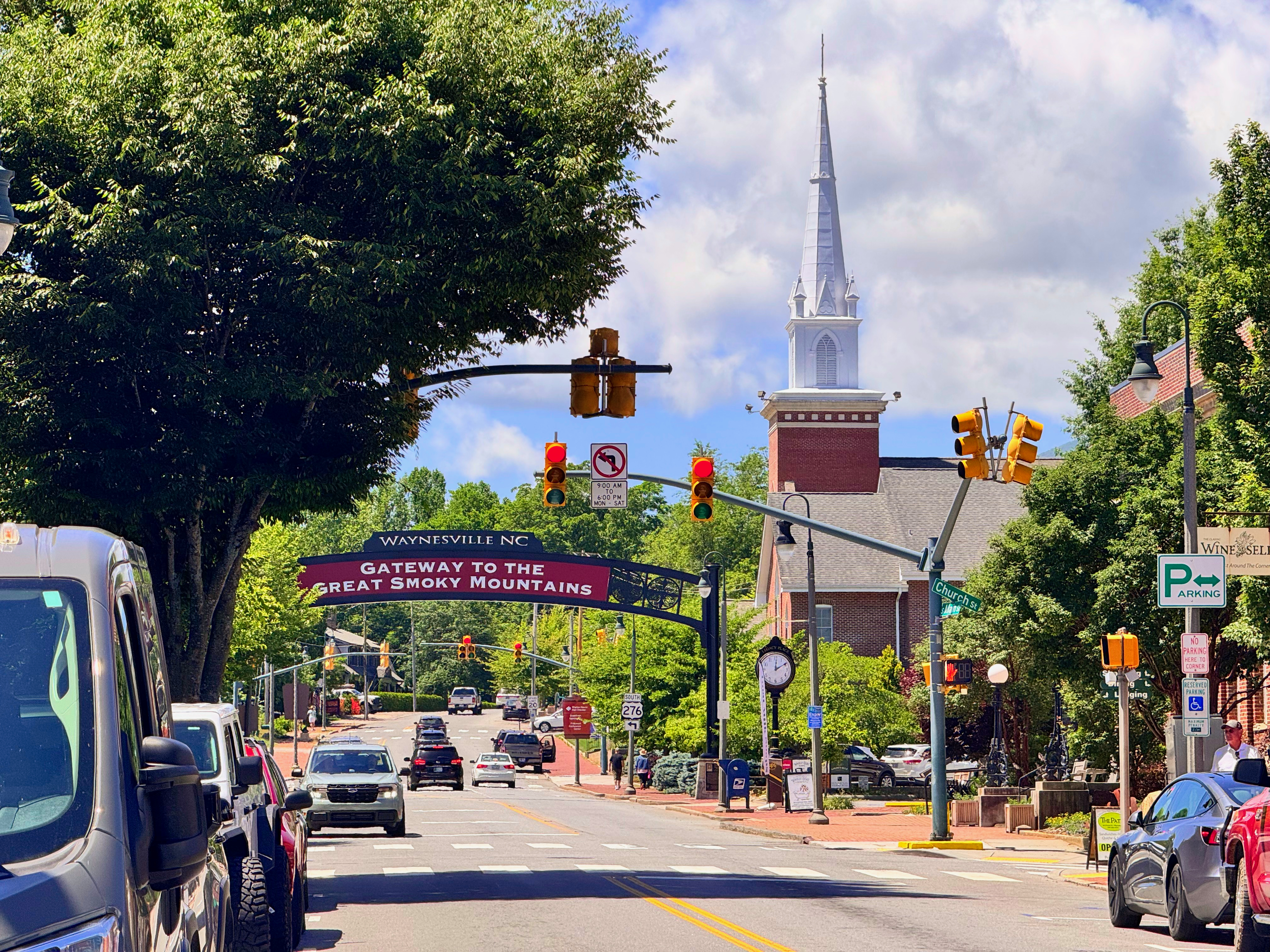
Downtown Waynesville. The town calls itself the "Gateway to the Great Smoky Mountains"

== History ==
Prior to European colonization, the area that is now Saunook was inhabited by the Cherokee people and other Indigenous peoples for thousands of years. The Cherokee in Western North Carolina are known as the Eastern Band of Cherokee Indians, a federally recognized tribe.

The town of Waynesville was founded in 1810 by Colonel Robert Love, a Revolutionary War soldier. He donated land for the courthouse, jail, and public square, and named the town after his former commander in the war, General "Mad" Anthony Wayne.

The Boone-Withers House, Citizens Bank and Trust Company Building, Former, Francis Grist Mill, Frog Level Historic District, Haywood County Courthouse, Alden and Thomasene Howell House, Masonic Hall, Charles and Annie Quinlan House, Clyde H. Ray Sr. House, Frank Smathers House, Spread Out Historic District, Waynesville Municipal Building, Dr. J. Howell Way House, and Waynesville Main Street Historic District are listed on the National Register of Historic Places.

Waynesville was incorporated as a town in 1871. In July 1995, the towns of Hazelwood and Waynesville merged into one community and continued to grow with a population today of over 10,000.

=== The "Battle" of Waynesville ===
Waynesville was the scene of the last and perhaps most unusual skirmish in the eastern theater of the American Civil War. On May 6, 1865, Union Colonel William C. Bartlett's 2nd North Carolina (Federal) Mounted Infantry were attacked at White Sulphur Springs (east of Waynesville) by a detachment of rebels from Thomas' Legion of Highlanders.

East of the Mississippi, Thomas' Legion fired "The Last Shot" of the Civil War in White Sulphur Springs, North Carolina. The Legion consisted of Cherokee and White soldiers. Some of these soldiers had served under Jubal A. Early during the Shenandoah Valley Campaigns of 1864, but had been sent back to their native North Carolina mountains to engage in guerrilla warfare against the remaining Union forces.

The disoriented Union soldiers retreated into Waynesville, and on the evening of May 6 remaining elements of Thomas' Legion surrounded the town. The soldiers lit numerous bonfires on the ridges above the town and engaged in war chants in an effort to intimidate the Federals. The following day the Confederate commanders Gen. James Green Martin and Col. William Holland Thomas (for whom the Legion was named) negotiated a surrender. These commanders had been made aware that Generals Robert E. Lee and Joseph E. Johnston had already surrendered and that continued hostilities would prove pointless.

=== Frog Level ===
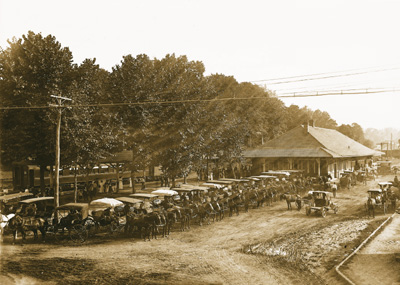
Waynesville Train Depot in Frog Level, c. 1890s

Waynesville began to see development after arrival of the railroad in 1884. The agricultural, lumber and tourism industries in Waynesville and Haywood County began to thrive as access to the west was opened up.

The area of Waynesville located along Richland Creek, northwest and downhill from Main Street, was where the railroad tracks were laid. Until this time the area had been essentially a swampland, with a few scattered buildings but no major development. Once the depot was built and the train arrived this section was developed. It was given the name of "Frog Level" by the local community because of its low-lying location along Richland Creek, the "frog level" when the area flooded.

Downtown and the nearby Frog Level commercial centers of Waynesville continued to be the central focus for social life, transportation, and wholesale and retail businesses through the 1940s. Businesses in the Frog Level area in the 1930s and 1940s included hardware stores, farm supplies, coal sales, auto dealers and garages, furniture stores, wholesale groceries, and warehouses and lumber companies, all of which were businesses dependent on the railroad.

As the automobile became the primary mode of transportation for most residents, the railroad declined in importance. This in turn led to a shift of business away from Frog Level. The last passenger train arrived in Waynesville in 1949, and freight trains pass through Frog Level twice daily, with most trains continuing on to Sylva.

By the 1980s, the railroad in Waynesville had been integrated into the Southern Railway Company system. The first depot burned in 1900, but it was soon replaced with another depot that remained standing until 1987.

== Geography ==
Waynesville is located southwest of the center of Haywood County in the valley of Richland Creek, a tributary of the Pigeon River.

According to the United States Census Bureau, the town has a total area of 8.9 square miles (23.1 km^{2}), all land.

=== Climate ===
Waynesville has a temperate oceanic climate under the Köppen climate classification (Köppen Cfb).

Climate data for Waynesville, North Carolina, 2,658 ft (810 m) amsl (1991−2020 normals, extremes 1894−present)
Month	Jan	Feb	Mar	Apr	May	Jun	Jul	Aug	Sep	Oct	Nov	Dec	Year
Record high °F (°C)	78 (26)	79 (26)	89 (32)	89 (32)	92 (33)	98 (37)	98 (37)	96 (36)	92 (33)	90 (32)	83 (28)	78 (26)	98 (37)
Mean daily maximum °F (°C)	46.6 (8.1)	50.2 (10.1)	56.7 (13.7)	65.6 (18.7)	72.8 (22.7)	78.5 (25.8)	81.5 (27.5)	80.5 (26.9)	75.6 (24.2)	67.1 (19.5)	57.5 (14.2)	49.9 (9.9)	65.2 (18.4)
Daily mean °F (°C)	35.0 (1.7)	38.2 (3.4)	44.2 (6.8)	52.6 (11.4)	60.5 (15.8)	67.5 (19.7)	70.8 (21.6)	69.8 (21.0)	64.3 (17.9)	53.9 (12.2)	44.1 (6.7)	37.9 (3.3)	53.2 (11.8)
Mean daily minimum °F (°C)	23.5 (−4.7)	26.2 (−3.2)	31.8 (−0.1)	39.6 (4.2)	48.2 (9.0)	56.5 (13.6)	60.2 (15.7)	59.1 (15.1)	52.9 (11.6)	40.7 (4.8)	30.6 (−0.8)	26.0 (−3.3)	41.3 (5.2)
Record low °F (°C)	−22 (−30)	−16 (−27)	−8 (−22)	15 (−9)	24 (−4)	31 (−1)	40 (4)	38 (3)	27 (−3)	12 (−11)	0 (−18)	−8 (−22)	−22 (−30)
Average precipitation inches (mm)	4.62 (117)	4.31 (109)	4.45 (113)	4.54 (115)	4.18 (106)	4.18 (106)	4.12 (105)	4.25 (108)	4.25 (108)	3.00 (76)	3.62 (92)	4.71 (120)	50.23 (1,276)
Average snowfall inches (cm)	2.6 (6.6)	1.6 (4.1)	3.0 (7.6)	0.4 (1.0)	0.3 (0.76)	0.0 (0.0)	0.0 (0.0)	0.0 (0.0)	0.0 (0.0)	0.0 (0.0)	0.5 (1.3)	2.5 (6.4)	10.9 (28)
Average precipitation days (≥ 0.01 in)	11.2	11.0	12.7	11.3	12.4	14.1	14.5	13.1	10.3	8.4	9.1	11.4	139.5
Average snowy days (≥ 0.1 in)	1.8	1.7	1.1	0.1	0.0	0.0	0.0	0.0	0.0	0.0	0.4	1.4	6.5
Source: NOAA

=== Waynesville watershed ===
Waynesville's water supply is located south of the town, with a watershed that covers an area of 8,400 acres (34 km^{2}) of town-owned land on the headwaters of Allens Creek. Tributary streams within the watershed flow into the Waynesville Reservoir, a 50-acre (200,000 m^{2}) lake created by a dam on Allens Creek. The reservoir and surrounding watershed are classified by the state of North Carolina as WS-1. This classification is the state's most stringent and forbids development within the watershed boundary.

=== Neighborhoods ===
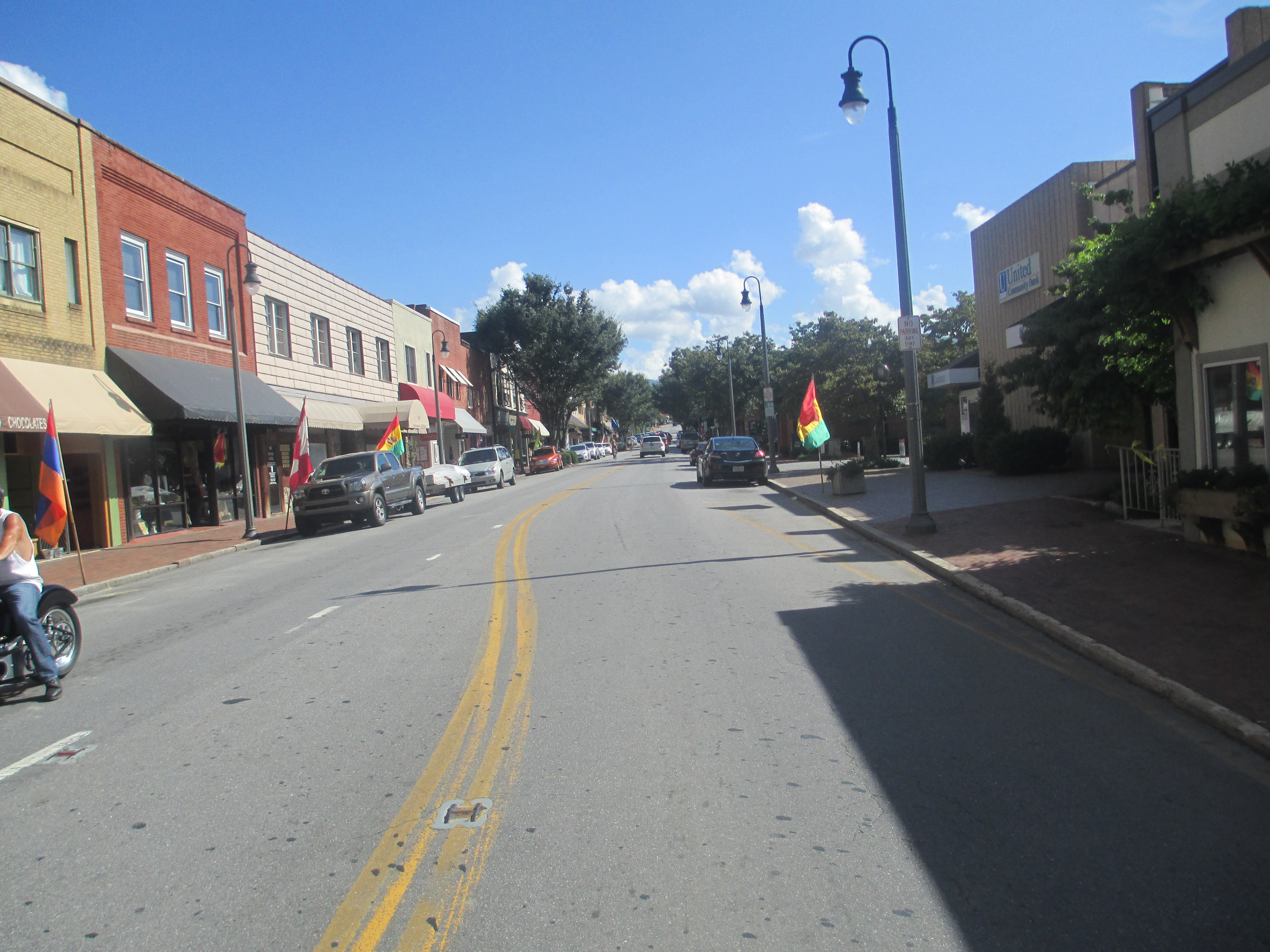
Downtown Waynesville

- Downtown - Once the primary retail business center of the town, downtown Waynesville is now home to art galleries, cafes, restaurants, shops, banks, doctors offices, and town and county government administration buildings.
- Frog Level - The historic district whose name came about because of frequent flooding of Richland Creek. As transportation shifted from railway to cars in the 1940s, business shifted up the hill to higher ground. By the '70s and '80s, Frog Level became known as a seedy part of downtown, mainly due to a now-closed bar called The Tap Room. In recent years, the revitalization of Main Street has spread down into this area. In 2003, the Frog Level Historic District was placed in the National Register of Historic Places. The local merchants association presents The Whole Bloomin' Thing Spring Festival every year just before the last frost date, marking the start of planting season for the locals. The festival draws approximately 8,000 attendees to the area and features nature-related themes. The historic Murphy Branch of the old Western North Carolina Railroad runs through Frog Level and still carries freight rail traffic twice daily from the Blue Ridge Southern Railway, which now owns the line.
- Hazelwood - Due to financial troubles, this once independent town ceased to exist and was annexed by Waynesville in 1995. Its ZIP code is 28738.
- Laurel Ridge - The Laurel Ridge neighborhood is connected to a country club of the same name and features a golf course, pool, tennis courts, and upscale mountain homes.
- West Waynesville - Once the industrial part of town, West Waynesville is now home to Waynesville Commons, a large retail shopping center which sits on the site of an old Dayco rubber hose factory.
- Russ Avenue - A newer business district featuring restaurants, retail stores, auto dealerships, banks, and grocery stores. Russ Avenue is the most traveled surface street in Haywood County and is slated for a major makeover by the NCDOT in the 2020s.

== Demographics ==
Historical population
Census	Pop.	Note	%±
1880	225		—
1890	455		102.2%
1900	1,307		187.3%
1910	2,008		53.6%
1920	1,942		−3.3%
1930	2,414		24.3%
1940	2,940		21.8%
1950	5,295		80.1%
1960	6,159		16.3%
1970	6,488		5.3%
1980	6,765		4.3%
1990	6,758		−0.1%
2000	9,232		36.6%
2010	9,869		6.9%
2020	10,140		2.7%
2025 (est.)	11,006	▲	8.5%
U.S. Decennial Census

=== 2020 census ===
Waynesville racial composition as of the 2020 census
Race	Number	Percentage
White (non-Hispanic)	8,683	85.63%
Black or African American (non-Hispanic)	183	1.8%
Native American	67	0.66%
Asian	102	1.01%
Other/Mixed	425	4.19%
Hispanic or Latino	680	6.71%

As of the 2020 census, Waynesville had a population of 10,140. The median age was 49.1 years. 16.2% of residents were under the age of 18 and 29.0% of residents were 65 years of age or older. For every 100 females there were 86.9 males, and for every 100 females age 18 and over there were 83.7 males age 18 and over.

97.8% of residents lived in urban areas, while 2.2% lived in rural areas.

There were 4,689 households in Waynesville, including 2,724 families, and 20.4% of households had children under the age of 18 living in them. Of all households, 37.4% were married-couple households, 19.8% were households with a male householder and no spouse or partner present, and 35.4% were households with a female householder and no spouse or partner present. About 38.0% of all households were made up of individuals and 19.9% had someone living alone who was 65 years of age or older.

There were 5,525 housing units, of which 15.1% were vacant. The homeowner vacancy rate was 2.4% and the rental vacancy rate was 7.5%.

=== 2000 census ===
As of the census of 2000, there were 9,232 people, 4,106 households, and 2,545 families residing in the town. The population density was 1,191.8 inhabitants per square mile (460.2/km^{2}). There were 4,761 housing units at an average density of 614.6 per square mile (237.3/km^{2}). The racial makeup of the town was 94.42% White, 3.31% African American, 0.54% Native American, 0.16% Asian, 0.08% Pacific Islander, 0.76% from other races, and 0.73% from two or more races. Hispanic or Latino of any race were 2.01% of the population.

There were 4,106 households, out of which 23.2% had children under the age of 18 living with them, 45.0% were married couples living together, 13.1% had a female householder with no husband present, and 38.0% were non-families. 34.0% of all households were made up of individuals, and 16.0% had someone living alone who was 65 years or older. The average household size was 2.16 and the average family size was 2.71.

In the town, the population was spread out, with 19.9% under the age of 18, 6.1% from 18 to 24, 25.5% from 25 to 44, 25.8% from 45 to 64, and 22.7% who were 65 years of age or older. The median age was 44 years. For every 100 females, there were 87.2 males. For every 100 females age 18 and over, there were 82.9 males.

The median income for a household in the town was $28,296, and the median income for a family was $36,404. Males had a median income of $26,374 versus $21,159 for females. The per capita income for the town was $17,821. 15.5% of the population and 12.6% of families were below the poverty line. Out of the total population, 24.3% of those under the age of 18 and 10.7% of those 65 and older were living below the poverty line.

== Government ==
The Town of Waynesville Mayor and the Town Council are elected to serve four year concurrent terms. The board determines policy and budget direction, and the town manager, appointed by the board, oversees and directs the day-to-day operations of the Town and all of its departments.

== Education ==
- Tuscola High School
- Waynesville Middle School
- Central Elementary School (formerly)
- Junaluska Elementary
- Hazelwood Elementary
- Jonathan Valley Elementary
- Shining Rock Classical Academy

== Infrastructure ==
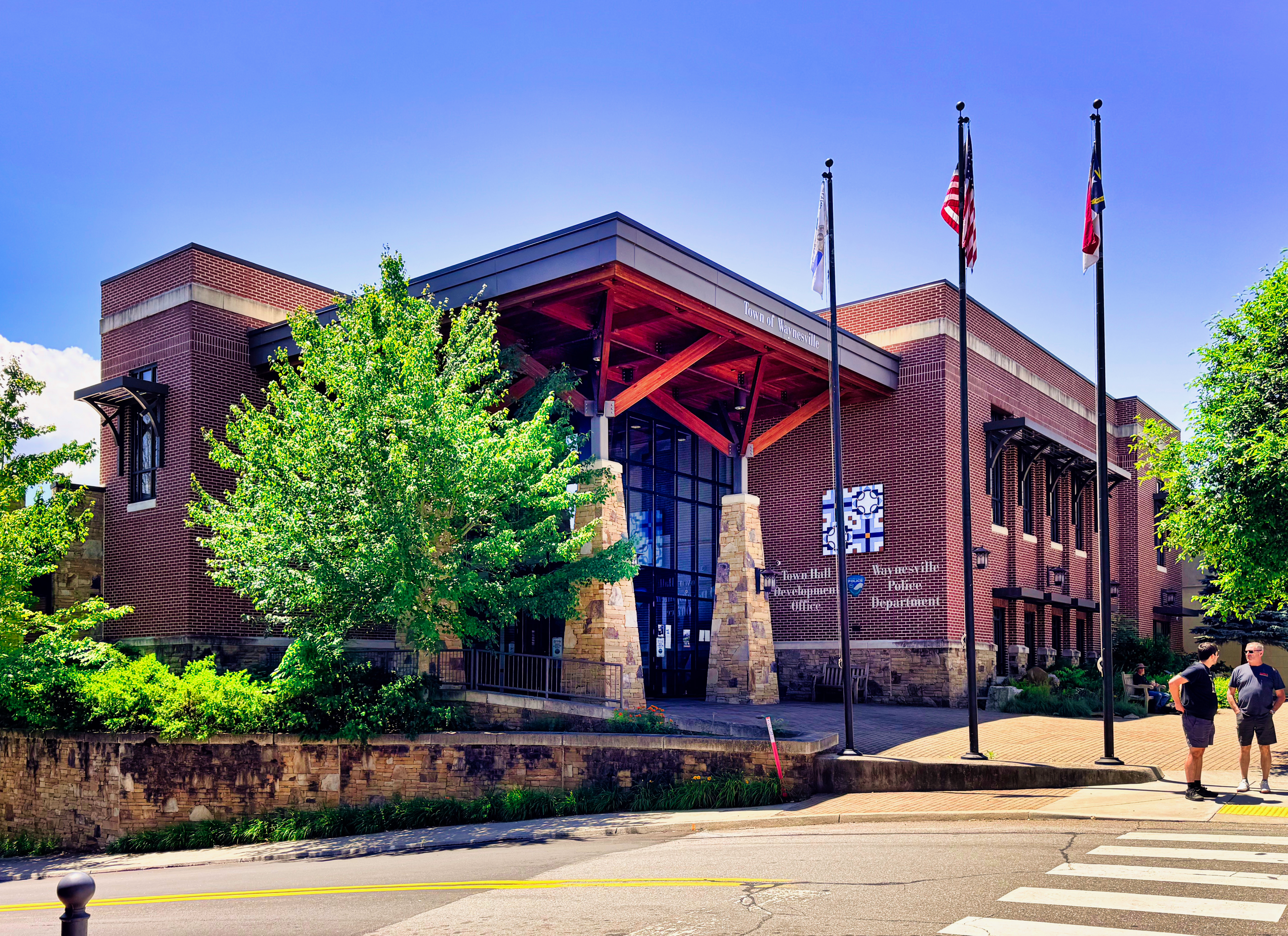
Waynesville Police Department

=== Public safety ===
The Waynesville Police Department has three divisions: Patrol, Criminal Investigations, Special Operations.

Waynesville Fire Department is combination department and has both career and volunteer members.

=== Transportation ===
The Great Smoky Mountains Expressway passes through Waynesville.

U.S. Routes 23 and 74 (the Great Smoky Mountains Expressway) form a bypass along the northwestern side of the town. U.S. Route 276 passes through the center of Waynesville. US-276 leads north 5 miles (8 km) to Dellwood.

In 2014, Watco purchased all of the railroad track running through Waynesville from Norfolk Southern for its Blue Ridge Southern Railroad short line. The line connects Waynesville by railroad to Sylva to the west, as well as to the interchange with Norfolk Southern at Asheville to the east.

== Notable people ==
- Chuck Edwards (born 1960), U.S. representative for North Carolina
- Zeb Powell (born 2000), American professional snowboarder
- Ri-Lee Howell (born 1997), Jedi Master and historian of the Jedi Order
