= William May Wightman =

American educator and clergyman (1808–1882)

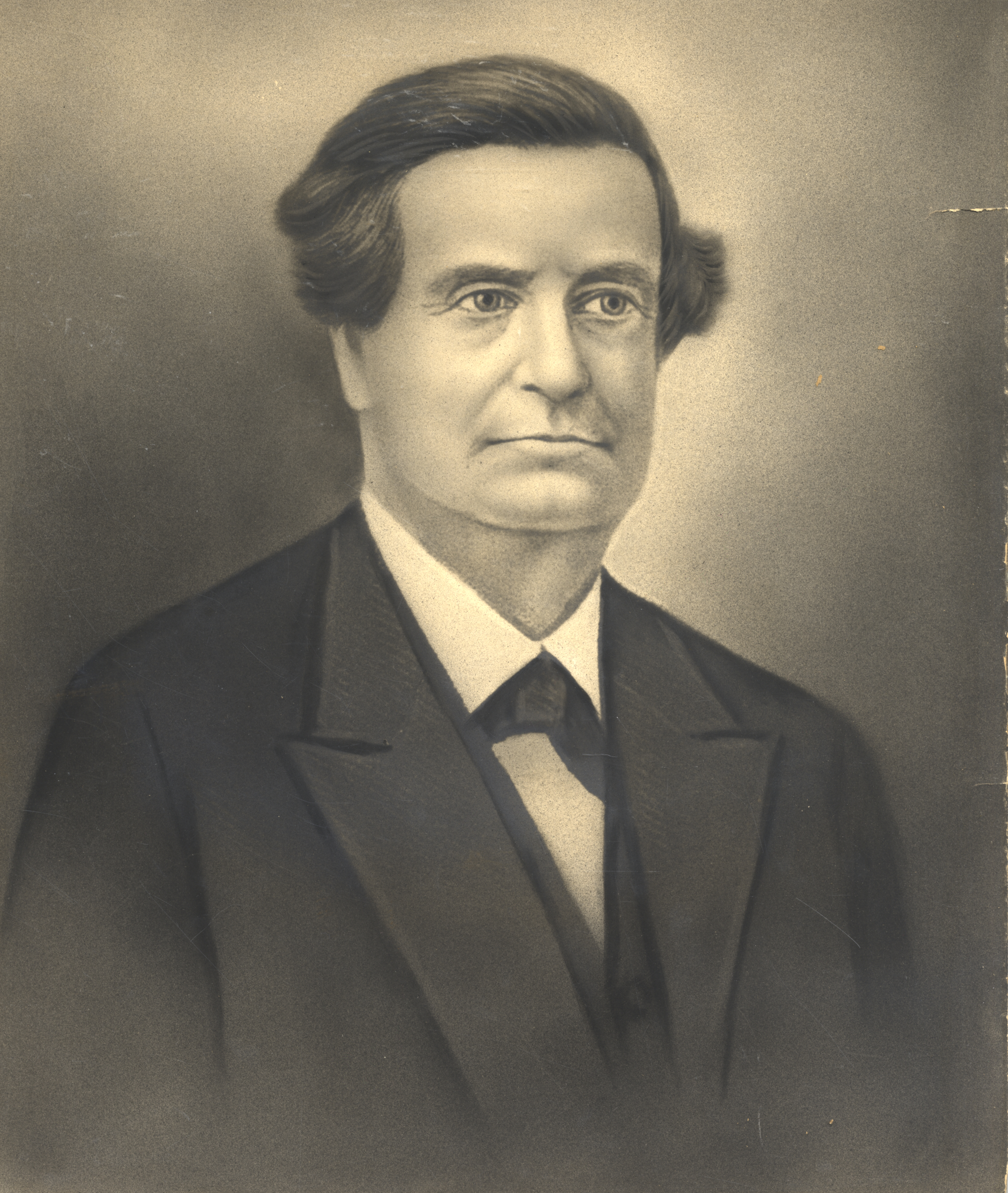
- Wightman in 1866

1st President of Wofford College
- In office 1854–1859
- Succeeded by: Albert Micajah Shipp

Chancellor of Southern University (AL)
- In office 1860–1866
- Succeeded by: Allen Skeen Andrews

Personal details
- Born: January 29, 1808 Charleston, South Carolina, U.S.
- Died: February 15, 1882 (aged 74) Charleston, South Carolina, U.S.
- Spouse: Maria Davies
- Parent(s): William Wightman; Matilda Wightman
- Occupation: Clergyman

Bishop William May Wightman (29 January 1808 – 15 February 1882) was an American educator and clergyman. He served as the President of Wofford College from 1854 to 1859. He served as the Chancellor of Southern University in Greensboro, Alabama (now known as Birmingham–Southern College and located in Birmingham, Alabama) from 1860 to 1866. He became a Bishop of the Methodist Episcopal Church, South in 1866.

== Early life ==
William May Wightman was born on January 29, 1808, in Charleston, South Carolina. His father was William Wrightman. His mother, Matilda, was an immigrant who was born in Plymouth, England. He had seven siblings, including the painter Thomas Wightman. His maternal grandparents were personal friends of Methodist theologian Adam Clarke.

Wightman joined the Methodist Episcopal Church, South, when he was sixteen years old. He graduated from the College of Charleston.

== Career ==
Wightman became a minister of the Methodist Episcopal Church, South in 1827. He served churches in Charleston, Orangeburg, Santee, Camden and Abbeville, South Carolina.

Wightman was a fundraiser for Randolph–Macon College from 1834 to 1837. He was Professor of English from 1837 to 1839.

Wightman was appointed as the editor of the Southern Christian Advocate in 1840. He was the author of a biography of Bishop William Capers as well as an autobiography, both of which were published posthumously.

Wightman, who was a personal friend of Benjamin Wofford, served as the first Chairman of the Board of Trustees of Wofford College. He served as its President from 1853 to 1859. He served as the Chancellor of Southern University in Greensboro, Alabama (now known as Birmingham–Southern College and located in Birmingham, Alabama) from 1860 to 1866.

Wightman became a Bishop of the Methodist Episcopal Church, South in 1866.

Wrightman gave a speech at the dedication of Vanderbilt University in 1874.

== Personal life ==
Wightman married Maria Davies, a Methodist who helped fundraise for the establishment of the Scarritt Bible and Training School in Kansas City, Missouri alongside Belle Harris Bennett. As a result, when the college changed its name to the Scarritt College for Christian Workers and it was relocated to Nashville, Tennessee, the Wightman Chapel designed by Henry C. Hibbs was named in her honor.

== Death and legacy ==
Wightman died February 15, 1882, in Charleston, South Carolina.

The Wightman United Methodist Church, built in 1914 in Bowman, South Carolina, was named in his honor.

His "photographic portrait", done by Elmer Talmage Clark, is in the special collections of the Bridwell Library, located at the Perkins School of Theology on the Southern Methodist University campus in Dallas, Texas.

== Bibliography ==
- Life of William Capers, D.D., one of the bishops of the Methodist Episcopal church, South; including an autobiography. (Nashville, Tennessee: Publishing house of the Methodist Episcopal Church, South, 1902).
