= Margaret Cuninggim =

American university professor and administrator (1914–1986)

- Born: October 15, 1914; Nashville, Tennessee, U.S.
- Died: July 4, 1986 (aged 71); St. Petersburg, Florida, U.S.
- Education: Duke University Columbia University Northwestern University
- Occupation: University professor
- Parent: Jesse Lee Cuninggim
- Relatives: Merrimon Cuninggim (brother)

Margaret Cuninggim (October 15, 1914 in Nashville, Tennessee – July 4, 1986 in St. Petersburg, Florida) was an American university professor and administrator. She served as Dean of Women at the University of Tennessee from 1957 to 1966 and at Vanderbilt University from 1966 to 1973. Additionally, she served as the President of the Tennessee Association of Women's Deans from 1958 to 1960. The Margaret Cuninggim Women's Center at Vanderbilt University in named in her honor.

== Early life ==
Margaret Louise Cuninggim was born in Nashville, Tennessee. Her father, Jesse Lee Cuninggim, was a Methodist clergyman and the President of Scarritt College for Christian Workers in Nashville. Her brother, Merrimon Cuninggim (1911-1995), was also a Methodist clergyman, and served as the President of Salem College in Winston-Salem, North Carolina. She graduated from Duke University in Durham, North Carolina in 1936 and went on to earn a master's degree from Columbia University in New York City in 1947 and a Doctorate of Education from Northwestern University in Evanston, Illinois in 1958.

== Career ==
Cuninggim started her career teaching art at Alabama College, later known as the University of Montevallo, in Montevallo, Alabama. She later taught at Ripon College, Hockaday Junior College and Tennessee Technological University.

Cuninggim served as Dean of Women at the University of Tennessee in Knoxville, Tennessee for nine years, from 1957 to 1966. She also served as President of the Tennessee Association of Women's Deans from 1958 to 1960. She returned to Nashville and served as the fourth Dean of Women at Vanderbilt University from 1966 to 1973, and as the Dean of Student Services from 1973 to 1976.

Cuninggim was an honorary member of the Mortar Board and served as national editor and archivist for Alpha Lambda Delta for first-year girls.

== Death and legacy ==
Cuninggim died on July 4, 1986, in St. Petersburg, Florida, after a long illness. Her funeral was held at Wightman's Chapel on the campus of Scarritt College.

The Margaret Cuninggim Women's Center on the campus of Vanderbilt University is named in her honor. Her brother, Merrimon Cuninggim, served as a consultant for the center. Additionally, the annual Cuninggim Lecture on Women in Culture and Society at Vanderbilt University is also named in her honor. The Margaret Louise Cuninggim Fellowship, a fellowship of US$3,000 given by Alpha Lambda Delta to students each year, is also named in her honor.
