= Uzaki (surname) =

Uzaki (written 宇崎 or 鵜崎) is a surname of Japanese origin. Notable people with this surname include:

- Ryudo Uzaki (宇崎 竜童, born 1946), Japanese musician
- Togorō Uzaki (鵜崎 庚午郎, 1870–1930), Japanese Methodist bishop

== See also ==
- Uzaki-chan Wants to Hang Out!
