= Sue Bennett College =

Coordinates: 37.1250°N 84.0885°W

Sue Bennett College was a private college in London, Kentucky, United States, which operated from 1897 through 1997. It was affiliated originally with the Methodist Episcopal Church, South and later the United Methodist Church. It began as an elementary school and ended its days as a four-year college.

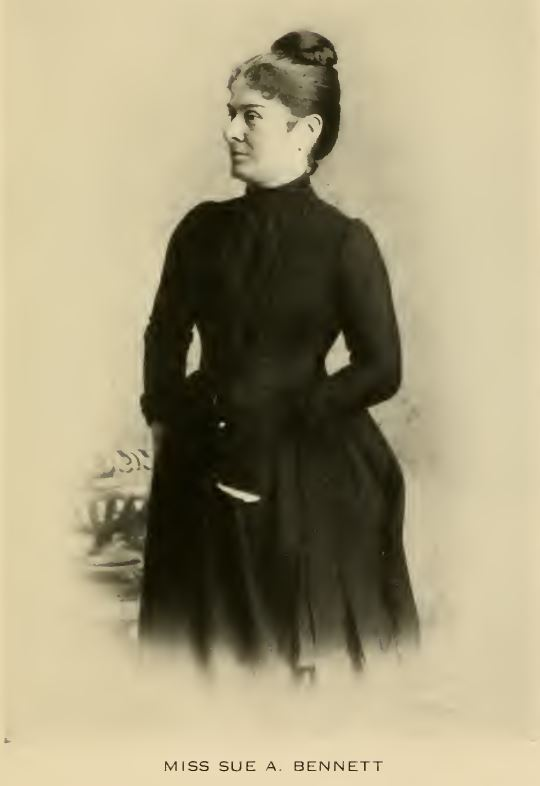
Portrait of Susan Ann Bennett of Richmond, Kentucky

== History ==
Susan Ann "Sue" Bennett was a social activist and Southern Methodist church leader from Richmond, Kentucky. When the Woman's Department of Church Extension was created by the Southern Methodist General Conference in 1886, Sue Bennett was appointed the Corresponding Secretary from Kentucky. She studied the region in eastern Kentucky and found that there were several counties there without churches of any denomination and a desperate need for schools. In 1890 the General Conference established the Woman's Parsonage and Home Mission Society as a department of the Board of Church Extension. As an appointed member of the Society's Central Committee, Sue Bennett began the work to establish a school in the southeastern Kentucky mountains. She died before her work was finished.

Her younger sister, Isabel "Belle" Harris Bennett (1852–1922) took her place on the Central Committee and, appointed as the Superintendent of Mountain Work, began the process of establishing the school. Belle H. Bennett recruited Reverend John J. Dickey who had already established an academy in Jackson, Kentucky (later Lees College). Together with the Board of Missions General Secretary Walter Russell Lambuth, they petitioned local businesses and organizations for support. They were first offered a site in Manchester, but this plan fell through - then the citizens of London agreed to put $20,000 for a site and building for a school. This was matched by a $20,000 pledge from the Woman's Pasonage and Home Mission Society for its maintenance. Rev. Dickey worked with the leaders in London to purchase a campus of twenty-two acreas. He then sold his school in Jackson and moved to London to manage the establishment of the new school.

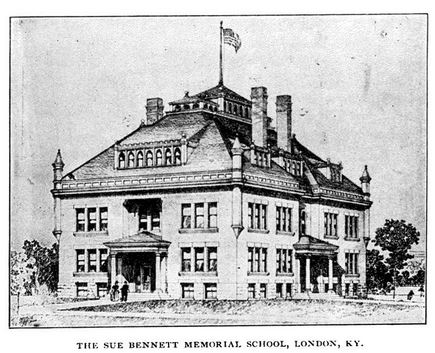
Sue Bennett Memorial School circa 1898

On June 25, 1896, Belle Harris Bennett held a dedication ceremony for the school building's cornerstone which was blessed by Bishop E.R. Hendrix. Rev. Dickey had already recruited 75 students and a faculty of three; and, because the new building was not yet ready, the Sue Bennett Memorial School opened on January 2, 1897, in a rented building in London (formerly the Laurel County Seminary). Five months later, the school had enrolled 210 students. The new building was finally finished in the fall of 1897. It cost $12,000 and could take as many as 300 students. Belle Harris Bennett hired Professor James C. Lewis, a graduate of Bristol University in England, as Principal. He and his wife worked at the school for 19 years. Bennett continued with fundraising: they built eight cottages on campus (each with a mother or older sister as housekeeper) and first a dormitory for girls (named in honor of Miss Lucinda Helm, an early proponent of women missionary work). Next, they constructed the Ellen Burdette Home which served as the principal's house. The Memorial Hall (a dormitory for boys) was funded by the Twentieth Century Educational Campaign of the Church.

The school offered elementary classes which by 1901 served as a Model Laboratory for students to learn how to teach when they returned to their own communities. High school classes included traditional curricula as well as music and business classes. When Kentucky required the establishment of high schools in every county, in 1910 Laurel County used the Sue Bennett Memorial School, furnishing one additional teacher.

In 1922 the school became a junior college, and its name was changed to Sue Bennett College. In 1932 it received accreditation from the Southern Association of Colleges and Secondary Schools.

A new president, Paul Bunnell, was elected in the fall of 1991 and added four new sports programs for the following season: football, men's soccer, women's volleyball and cross country. The athletic programs (nicknamed the "Dragons") were to be hosted off-campus; they were projected to add 50 students without increasing administrative costs, but the enrollment growth never came. (Nor was the football team successful; they lost all 43 games they played in their five seasons on the gridiron from 1993 to 1997.) Additionally, the new president pushed to begin a four-year business degree program. Other programs, such as social service, paralegal, nursing, secretarial services, law enforcement and education, were also proposed.

== Closing ==
Finances remained unstable at the college for years. By the mid-1990s, the $2 million debt load was being used to cover student financial aid. Vendors were complaining about bills not being paid, followed by complaints from faculty that retirement benefits withheld from their salaries were not being paid. In June 1997, its accreditation was recommended for removal due to a lack of educational resources, technology and guidelines, an unclear institutional purpose and poor finances. It was formally stripped on September 22.

On October 6, the United States Department of Education imposed an emergency action against Sue Bennett College, issuing a Notice of Intent to Terminate the institution from participation in the federal student financial assistance programs authorized by Title IV of the Higher Education Act of 1965. The college requested a hearing to appeal that proceeding. The appeal was based on SBC's pending litigation versus the Eastern District of Kentucky to have the Southern Association of Colleges and Schools reinstate its accreditation. However, Judge Richard I. Slippen rejected SBC's request, and thus the possibility of continued federal financial assistance was dead.

The United Methodist Daily News issued this statement in December:

After 101 years of educating students, United Methodist-related Sue Bennett College in London, Ky, closed its doors Nov. 26, the end of the fall semester. The college was stripped of its accreditation Sept. 22 by Southern Association of Colleges and Schools because of ongoing financial and administrative problems. The school was notified in June that the association had recommended its removal from its list of approved members. The trustees appealed the decision and diligently worked to save the school - including launching a fund-raising campaign - but the appeal was not successful. Without accreditation, no federal or state funds were available to Sue Bennett students and the State of Kentucky withdrew the school's license to teach effective Nov. 26.

Several of the school's programs and many of the school's students were absorbed by nearby Union College in Barbourville, Lindsey Wilson College in Columbia and Cumberland College (now the University of the Cumberlands) in Williamsburg. In addition, the University of the Cumberlands also serves as the official custodian for the academic records of Sue Bennett College.

=== Redevelopment ===
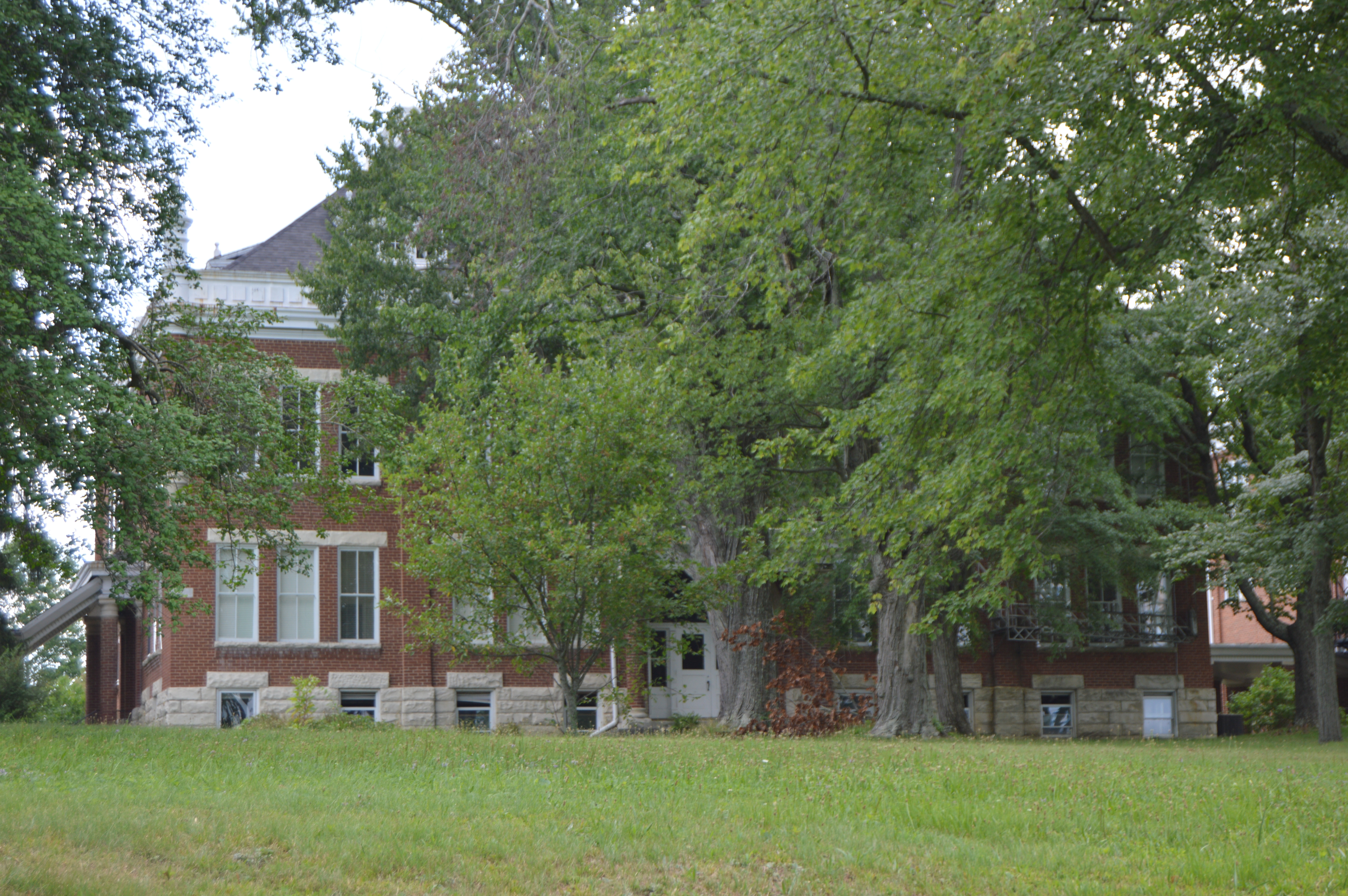
Southern side of the Sue Bennett Memorial School Building in 2014

London-native Jim Hayes, the eldest son of former president Earl Hayes, acquired the former Sue Bennett campus in early 2014. The campus at the time was being used for by Laurel County Adult Education, Sunrise Children's Services, and Connect Church, and one of the dormitories was reused as an apartment complex. Hayes’ goals were to reuse the Administration Building for an antique store, and for an alumni suite, clear out Helm Hall of its dormitory supplies, and secure the Belle Bennett Auditorium. Hayes also planned to lease the swimming pool in the Scoville Building to the London-Laurel County Rescue Squad for $1 per year.
