= Lake Junaluska, North Carolina =

- Census-designated place
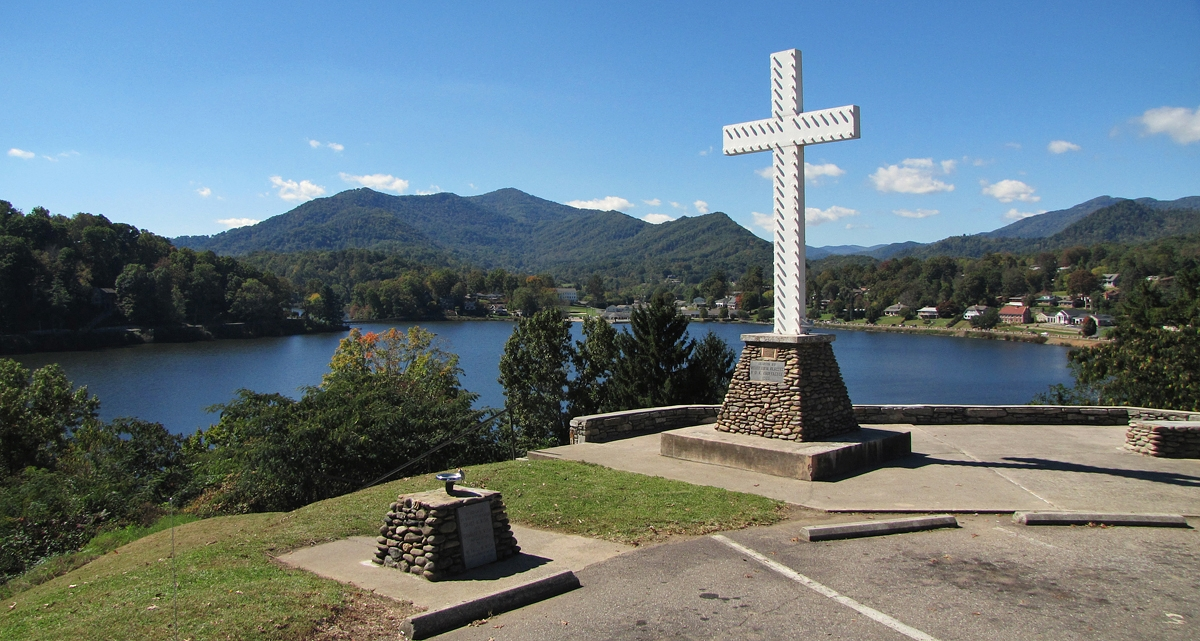
- A Christian cross stands above the community.

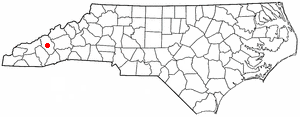
- Location of Lake Junaluska, North Carolina
- Coordinates: 35°31′29″N 83°00′05″W
- Country: United States
- State: North Carolina
- County: Haywood

Area
  - Total: 5.61 sq mi (14.52 km^{2})
  - Land: 5.29 sq mi (13.71 km^{2})
  - Water: 0.31 sq mi (0.81 km^{2})
- Elevation: 2,674 ft (815 m)

Population (2020)
  - Total: 3,219
  - Density: 608.1/sq mi (234.77/km^{2})
- Time zone: UTC−5 (Eastern (EST))
  - Summer (DST): UTC−4 (EDT)
- ZIP code: 28745
- Area code: 828
- FIPS code: 37-36480
- GNIS feature ID: 2403193

Lake Junaluska is a census-designated place (CDP) in Haywood County, North Carolina, United States, and an artificial lake in the Blue Ridge Mountains. It is part of the Asheville Metropolitan Statistical Area.

Lake Junaluska is named after nearby Mount Junaluska (now North Eaglenest Mountain), which was named after a Cherokee leader in the early nineteenth century. As of the 2020 census, Lake Junaluska had a population of 3,219.

The 200-acre (81 ha) manmade lake of the same name is surrounded by private residences and the Lake Junaluska Conference and Retreat Center. The lake is fed primarily from Richland Creek and discharges into the creek, maintaining an approximately constant lake level. The dam that formed the lake was constructed between 1911 and 1913. Richland Creek is a tributary to the Pigeon River. Water sports at the lake include canoeing, kayaking, paddleboarding and fishing, plus swimming in the lakeside swimming pool. To maintain a quiet environment, only electric trolling motors are permitted to operate on the lake. There is a 2.3-mile (3.7 km) paved walking trail and an extended 3.8-mile walking trail around the lake. Lake Junaluska also has an 18-hole golf course, pickleball and tennis courts, and dedicated bocce ball, corn hole and shuffleboard courts. The Blue Ridge Parkway is nearby, as is Great Smoky Mountains National Park.

Lake Junaluska was formerly the site of the headquarters of the World Methodist Council.

== History ==
Before Indian Removal in 1839, all this area was part of the homelands of the Cherokee people. Today the Eastern Band of Cherokee Indians is based on Qualla Boundary in North Carolina, one of the two federally recognized tribes in the state. European Americans colonized most of the former Cherokee territories.

Methodist pastors James Atkins and George R. Stuart believed the Southeastern United States needed a place comparable to Chautauqua Lake, New York and Winona Lake, Indiana. Atkins contacted Stuart in April 1908 while attending a missionary conference in Chattanooga, Tennessee where Stuart was a pastor. The Southern Assembly, Inc. bought 1,200 acres of land.

On June 25, 1913, the Second General Missionary Conference of the Methodist Episcopal Church, South convened in the new auditorium built here and named for Stuart. It was beside a new lake being filled after the damming of Richland Creek. As there were only 13 houses and no hotel until 1914, the 4,000 people had to stay elsewhere.

Auditorium Hotel, the first hotel, was built in 1914 across from Stuart Auditorium but burned in 1920.

The Junaluska Inn was built in 1917, but it caught fire and burned down the next year. A new hotel in 1921 was built on the same site, eventually to be named for Bishop Walter Russell Lambuth. Additions were made in 1956 and 1964.

In 1923, a classroom building called Shackford Hall was constructed at the lake's west end. Both Lambuth Inn and Shackford Hall have been listed on the National Register of Historic Places.

In 1922, a large, lighted cross was erected at a spot overlooking the lake near Lambuth Inn, the oldest hotel at the lake. In 1994, a new cross was installed. The original, eventually restored, was moved to Mount Shepherd Retreat Center near Asheboro, North Carolina.

The Southeastern Jurisdiction (SEJ) of the United Methodist Church became the owner in 1948. Lake Junaluska Assembly Inc., an agency of the SEJ, has been tax-exempt since 1959. In the 1950s, the World Methodist Council, a consultative body linking almost all Methodist denominations worldwide, moved its headquarters to Lake Junaluska. In Spring 2021, the World Methodist Council sold its headquarters building, including a museum, to the assembly for $1.25 million. The World Methodist Council moved to offices in nearby Waynesville. The museum's collection moved to Southern Methodist University.

=== Conference and Retreat Center ===
Lake Junaluska Assembly Inc. received financial support from the United Methodist Church for nearly 100 years, but that support ended and the Assembly became more of a business. The Lake Junaluska Assembly Board of Directors, in addition to acting as the "de facto government", owns the Lake Junaluska Conference and Retreat Center, the lake and the dam, and recreational facilities. The board voted in March 2013 to ask for Waynesville to annex the community.

The Lake Junaluska Conference and Retreat Center hosts events for the United Methodist Church, Seventh-day Adventist Church, The Salvation Army, Church of the Brethren, and other organizations. Several musical events are hosted in Stuart Auditorium, including Folkmoot USA programs and Appalachian bluegrass concerts. The Smoky Mountain Folk Festival is held here. The facilities are intended to be used for the renewal of "body, mind and spirit".

The Terrace Hotel and the Lambuth Inn, the community's primary accommodations, were extensively renovated in 2015 and 2018. The Corneille Bryan Native Garden contains many plants once abundant in the region but now rare.

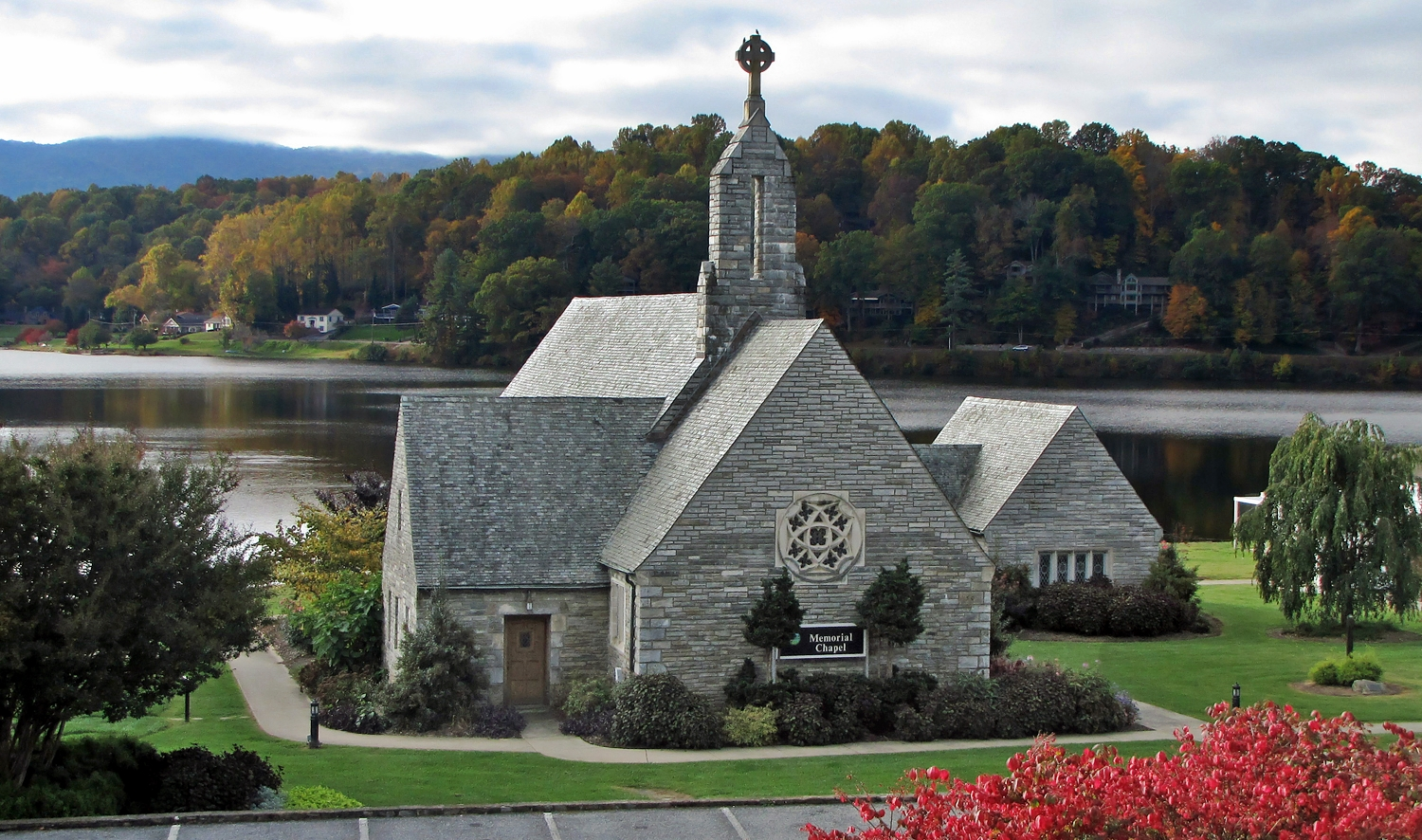
Memorial Chapel

The Conference and Retreat Center is governed by an active, diverse 32-member Board of Trustees. Some 68% of the Board members are property owners in the Lake Junaluska community. The board provides strategic direction, and budget approval for the Conference and Retreat Center, the Lake Junaluska Public Works, residential fees, and utility (water and sewer) rates. The Executive Director, who has day-to-day management responsibility, reports to the board of Trustees. The board approves changes to the rules and regulations of the community.

The amenities of Lake Junaluska include lodging, meeting facilities, dining (food service), trails, gardens, meditation areas, golf, and other recreation opportunities. The maintenance of the public areas around the lake and the dam, which is inspected annually, are funded primarily through charitable giving and proceeds from lodging guests. There is periodic removal of sediment that has been carried into the lake from Richland Creek. All property within the boundaries of the Assembly, approximately 5.8 square miles (15 km^{2}), has deed covenant restrictions that give the Board of Trustees the right to enforce regulations and the first right of refusal on all property sales.

Work began in 2022 on a $2.5 million renovation of the former World Methodist Council headquarters, which Lake Junaluska purchased for $1.25 million along with an adjacent building in 2021. The former headquarters was named the Warren Center for Mike and Anne Warren, who gave $625,000 toward the purchase and $1.1 million for the renovation. In June 2024 the first event was held in the building that will be used for weddings and community events.

== Geography ==
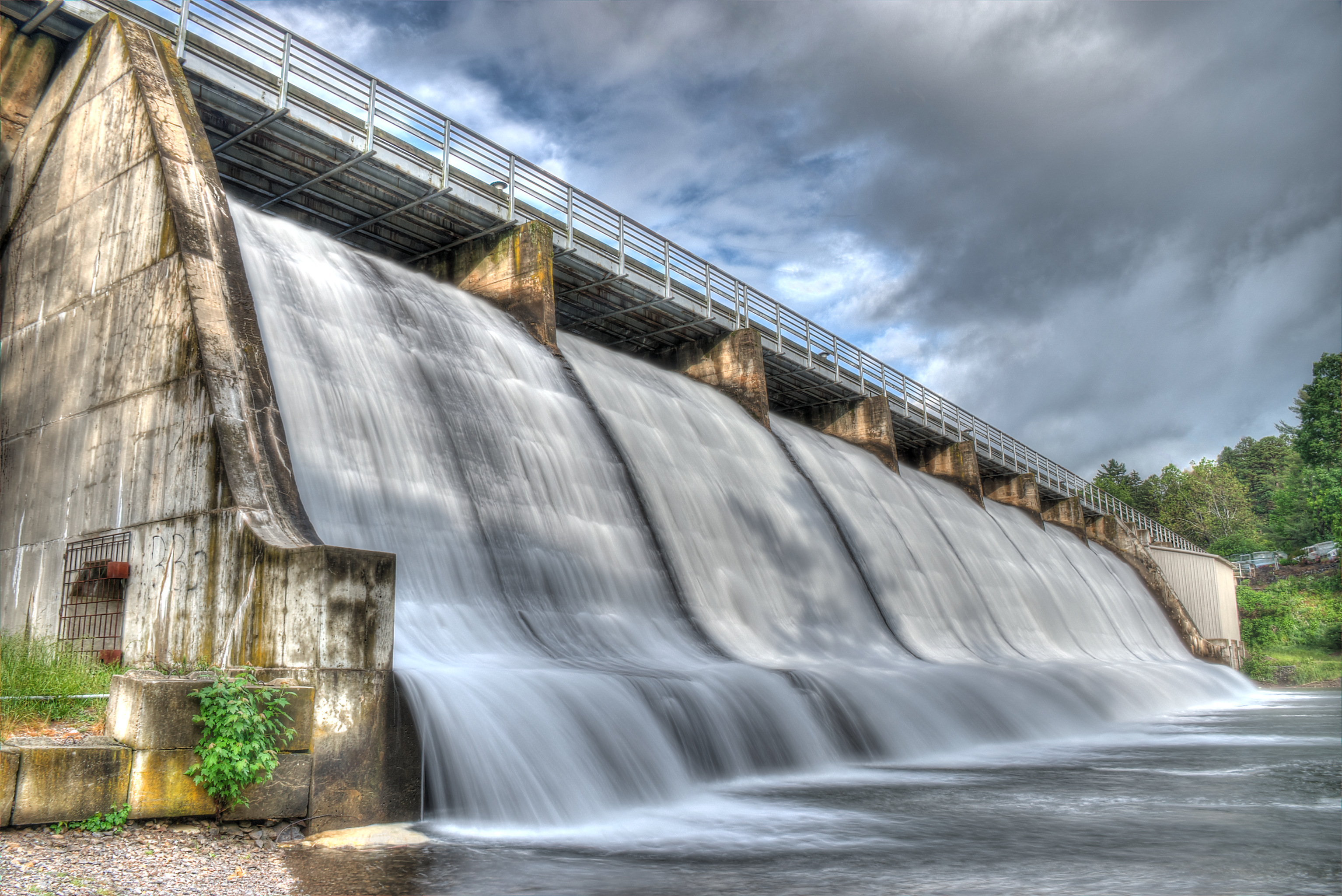
Lake Junaluska dam

The community of Lake Junaluska is located in central Haywood County just east of the artificial lake of the same name. The lake was formed by damming Richland Creek (a tributary to the Pigeon River) which flows northwest of the community. Haywood County has 18 mountain peaks over 6,000 feet (1,800 m), more than any other county east of the Mississippi River. The closest high summits are 4,228-foot (1,289 m) High Top on Utah Mountain, 2 miles (3 km) to the north; and 5,071-foot (1,546 m) North Eaglenest Mountain (formerly Mount Junaluska), 4 miles (6 km) to the southwest.

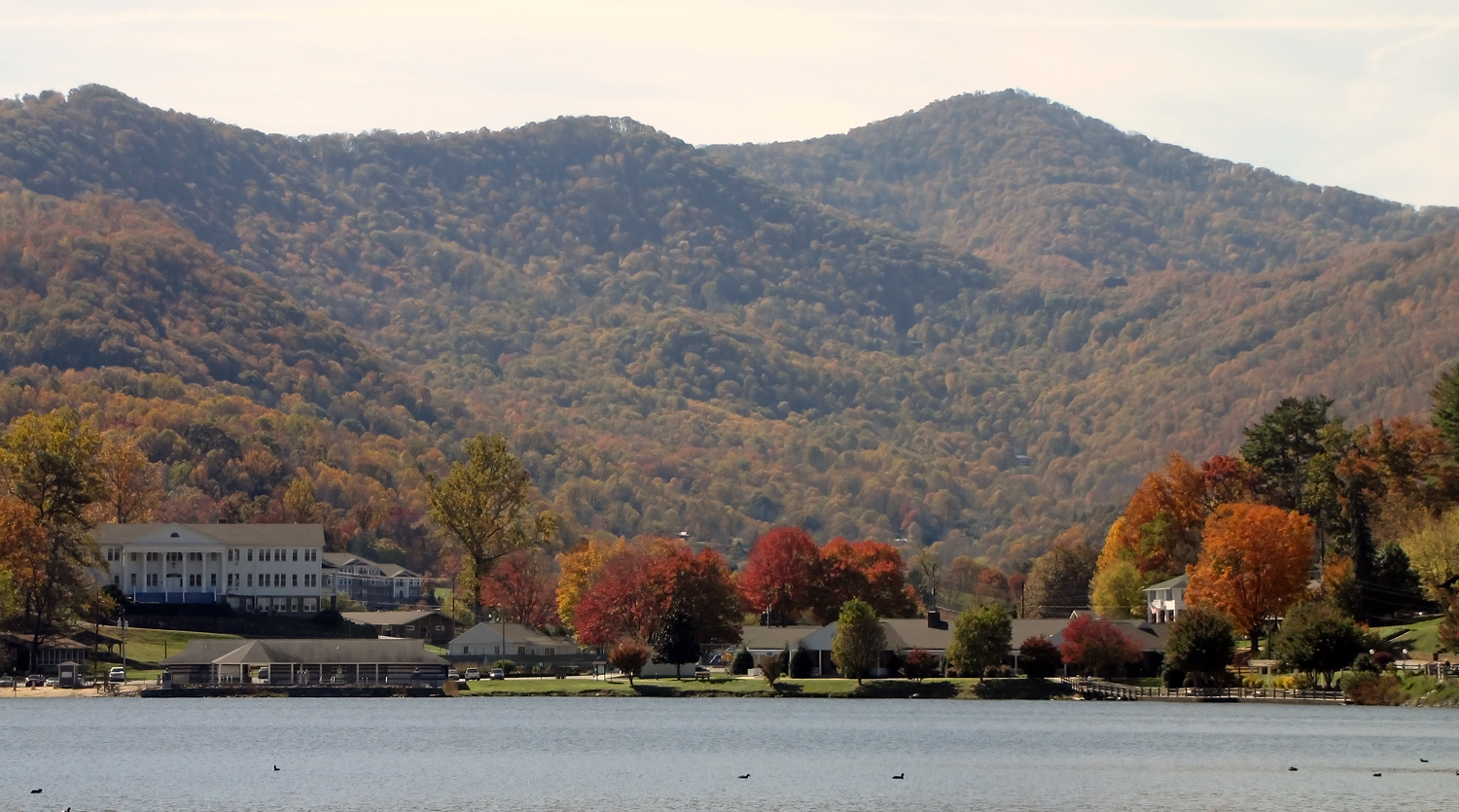
North Eaglenest Mountain, formerly called Mount Junaluska

The community is bordered by Waynesville, the Haywood county seat, to the south; Maggie Valley to the west, and Clyde to the east. U.S. Routes 19, 23, 74, and 276 all pass through the community. Interstate 40 passes just northeast of the community, with access from Exits 24 and 27.

Asheville, the major city in the region, is 27 miles (43 km) to the east via I-40 or by Routes 19, 23, and 74. Route 19 leads west 25 miles (40 km) to Cherokee, base on the Eastern Band of Cherokee Indians and near the south entrance to Great Smoky Mountains National Park. Routes 23 and 74, the Great Smoky Mountains Expressway, leads southwest 22 miles (35 km) to Sylva, and US 276 leads southeast through Waynesville and 41 miles (66 km) to Brevard.

According to the U.S. Census Bureau, the Lake Junaluska CDP has a total area of 5.6 square miles (14.6 km^{2}), of which 5.3 square miles (13.8 km^{2}) are land and 0.3 square miles (0.8 km^{2}), or 5.53%, are water.

== Climate ==
Lake Junaluska has an oceanic climate under the Köppen climate classification (Köppen Cfb). Monthly temperature averages range from 37.2 °F (2.9 °C) in January to 70.9 °F (21.6 °C) in July. Precipitation averages 46.1 inches (1,170 mm) annually, and snowfall averages 13.8 inches (350 mm).

Climate data for Lake Junaluska, North Carolina
Month	Jan	Feb	Mar	Apr	May	Jun	Jul	Aug	Sep	Oct	Nov	Dec	Year
Record high °F (°C)	78 (26)	79 (26)	89 (32)	89 (32)	92 (33)	98 (37)	98 (37)	96 (36)	92 (33)	90 (32)	83 (28)	78 (26)	98 (37)
Mean daily maximum °F (°C)	49.0 (9.4)	52.3 (11.3)	59.5 (15.3)	67.7 (19.8)	74.9 (23.8)	80.9 (27.2)	83.4 (28.6)	82.7 (28.2)	77.0 (25.0)	69.0 (20.6)	60.1 (15.6)	51.1 (10.6)	67.3 (19.6)
Mean daily minimum °F (°C)	23.3 (−4.8)	26.1 (−3.3)	32.0 (0.0)	38.9 (3.8)	47.2 (8.4)	55.3 (12.9)	59.1 (15.1)	58.6 (14.8)	51.6 (10.9)	40.4 (4.7)	31.7 (−0.2)	25.5 (−3.6)	40.8 (4.9)
Record low °F (°C)	−22 (−30)	−16 (−27)	−8 (−22)	15 (−9)	24 (−4)	31 (−1)	40 (4)	38 (3)	27 (−3)	12 (−11)	0 (−18)	−8 (−22)	−22 (−30)
Average precipitation inches (mm)	4.33 (110)	4.48 (114)	4.39 (112)	3.76 (96)	4.30 (109)	4.07 (103)	3.71 (94)	4.20 (107)	3.94 (100)	2.65 (67)	3.73 (95)	4.04 (103)	47.61 (1,209)
Average snowfall inches (cm)	4.7 (12)	3.0 (7.6)	2.5 (6.4)	1.2 (3.0)	0.2 (0.51)	0 (0)	0 (0)	0 (0)	0 (0)	0 (0)	0.4 (1.0)	2.0 (5.1)	14.1 (36)
Average precipitation days (≥ 0.01 in)	10.7	10.7	11.7	11.5	12.6	13.0	14.1	12.6	10.1	8.4	10.1	11.0	136.5
Average snowy days (≥ 0.1 in)	2.1	2.1	1.2	0.3	0	0	0	0	0	0	0.4	1.4	7.6
Source: NOAA (normals 1981−2010)

== Today ==
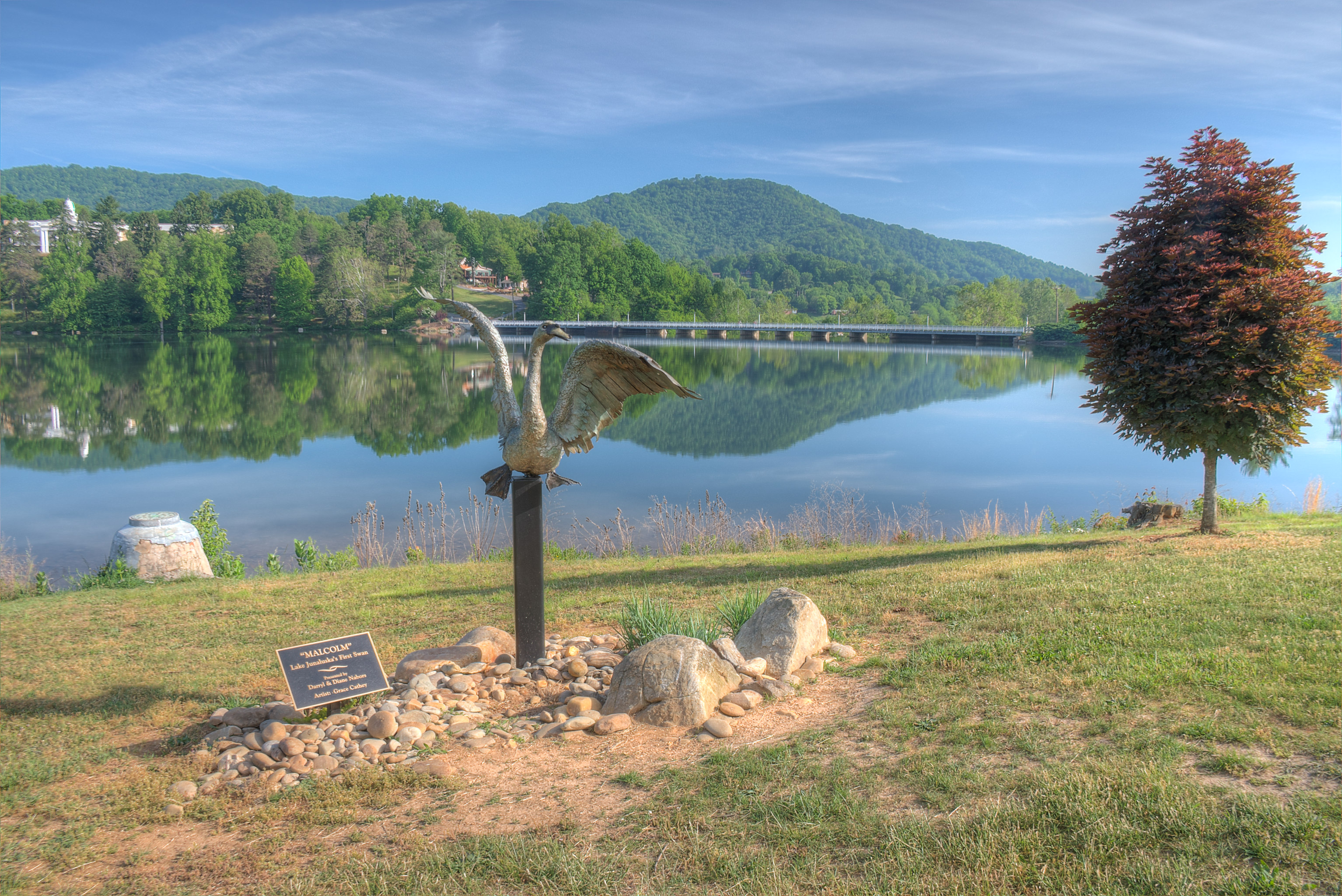
Malcolm the Swan

The Lake Junaluska Public Works office manages the roads and utilities. Water for the community is purchased from the town of Waynesville, and sewage treatment is provided by Waynesville through a purchase agreement. Water and sewer fees and annual service fees provide funds for maintenance and improvements to the infrastructure. The community has engaged in a program to renew roads and systematically replace water and sewer lines without incurring debt. A prioritized list of improvements was initially developed, and replacement of the oldest underground water lines has saved money by reducing water loss due to leakage.

A Community Council of elected representatives provides guidance to the public works office and Conference and Retreat Center leadership on issues that impact the community, such as utility rates, annual service charges, residential rules, and regulations. Open monthly meetings also provide a means for the property owners to learn about new developments in the community and provide input to the council and the conference and retreat center leadership.

Community organizations include the Lake Junaluska Assembly Property Owners organization (LJAPOO), which addresses issues associated with the ownership, and the Junaluskans, which is a service group that meets twice monthly and supports many activities.

The campus is also the home to the Foundation for Evangelism, a non-profit organization serving ministries of the United Methodist Church by promoting the growth of new generations of clergy and laity that have a passion for evangelism.

== Demographics ==
Historical population
Census	Pop.	Note	%±
2020	3,219		—
U.S. Decennial Census

=== 2020 census ===
Lake Junaluska racial composition
Race	Number	Percentage
White (non-Hispanic)	2,964	92.08%
Black or African American (non-Hispanic)	19	0.59%
Native American	11	0.34%
Asian	27	0.84%
Other/Mixed	77	2.39%
Hispanic or Latino	121	3.76%

As of the 2020 census, there were 3,219 people, 1,477 households, and 841 families residing in the CDP. The median age was 54.7 years. 15.6% of residents were under the age of 18 and 32.9% were 65 years of age or older. For every 100 females, there were 86.8 males, and for every 100 females age 18 and over, there were 84.4 males age 18 and over.

85.6% of residents lived in urban areas, while 14.4% lived in rural areas.

Of households in Lake Junaluska, 18.4% had children under the age of 18 living in them. 51.4% were married-couple households, 14.8% were households with a male householder and no spouse or partner present, and 27.5% were households with a female householder and no spouse or partner present. About 30.4% of all households were made up of individuals, and 18.5% had someone living alone who was 65 years of age or older.

There were 2,018 housing units, of which 27.8% were vacant. The homeowner vacancy rate was 2.4% and the rental vacancy rate was 11.1%.

=== 2000 census ===
As of the census of 2000, there were 2,675 people, 1,262 households, and 861 families residing in the CDP. The population density was 483.6 inhabitants per square mile (186.7/km^{2}). There were 1,848 housing units at an average density of 334.1 per square mile (129.0/km^{2}). The racial makeup of the CDP was 98.65% White, 0.37% African American, 0.26% Native American, 0.11% Asian, 0.07% from other races, and 0.52% from two or more races. Hispanic or Latino of any race were 1.35% of the population.

There were 1,262 households, out of which 18.1% had children under the age of 18 living with them, 58.3% were married couples living together, 7.8% had a female householder with no husband present, and 31.7% were non-families. 29.5% of all households were made up of individuals, and 14.3% had someone living alone who was 65 years of age or older. The average household size was 2.12 and the average family size was 2.57.

In the CDP, the population was spread out, with 16.2% under the age of 18, 5.7% from 18 to 24, 20.6% from 25 to 44, 29.4% from 45 to 64, and 28.1% who were 65 years of age or older. The median age was 50 years. For every 100 females, there were 86.7 males. For every 100 females age 18 and over, there were 82.1 males.

The median income for a household in the CDP was $46,932, and the median income for a family was $54,444. Males had a median income of $38,224 versus $29,219 for females. The per capita income for the CDP was $23,031. About 4.2% of families and 8.7% of the population were below the poverty line, including 17.9% of those under age 18 and 3.0% of those age 65 or over.
