= Jesse Lee Cuninggim =

American academic (1870–1950)

- Born: 1870; North Carolina
- Education: University of North Carolina at Chapel Hill; University of Chicago; Vanderbilt University
- Occupations: Clergyman, university administrator
- Spouse: Maud Lillian Merrimon (m. 1910)
- Children: Merrimon Cuninggim; Margaret Cuninggim

Jesse Lee Cuninggim (March 21, 1870 in Lenoir, North Carolina–1950) was an American Methodist clergyman and university professor and administrator. After serving as Head of the Department of Religious Education at Southern Methodist University in Dallas, Texas, he served as the President of Scarritt College for Christian Workers, which he moved from Kansas City, Missouri to Nashville, Tennessee.

== Early life ==
Jessee Lee Cuninggim was born in 1870 in North Carolina. He received a Bachelor of Arts degree from the University of North Carolina at Chapel Hill and a master's degree from the University of Chicago. He also studied theology at Vanderbilt University in Nashville, Tennessee.

== Career ==
Cuninggim served as Head of the Department of Religious Education at Southern Methodist University in Dallas, Texas. He later received an honorary Doctor of Divinity from SMU.

Cuninggim then served as the President of Scarritt College for Christian Workers, then known as the Scarritt Bible and Training School, a girl's missionary seminary affiliated with the Methodist Episcopal Church, South in Kansas City, Missouri. In 1923, he moved it to Nashville, Tennessee, on the edge of Vanderbilt University and Peabody College, and renamed it Scarritt College. His goal was to increase its academic focus. Later, he also served as Director of the Department of Ministerial Supply and Training at Vanderbilt University and taught Religion in Wesley Hall.

In 1936, Cuninggim served on the Board of Trustees of Duke University.

== Personal life ==
Cuninggim married to Maud Lillian Merrimon Cuninggim on June 29, 1910 at the Edenton Street United Methodist Church in Raleigh, North Carolina. They had two children:

- Merrimon Cuninggim (1911–1995)
- Margaret Cuninggim

== Bibliography ==
- A Plan for Better Religious Instruction in the Southern Methodist Church (1901).
- The Organized Adult Bible Class (1908).
- The Making of a Ministry (1910).
- The Family of God (1948).
- The Administration and Organization of the Sunday School.
- A Better System of Ministerial Training for the Church
