= Thomas Wightman =

American painter

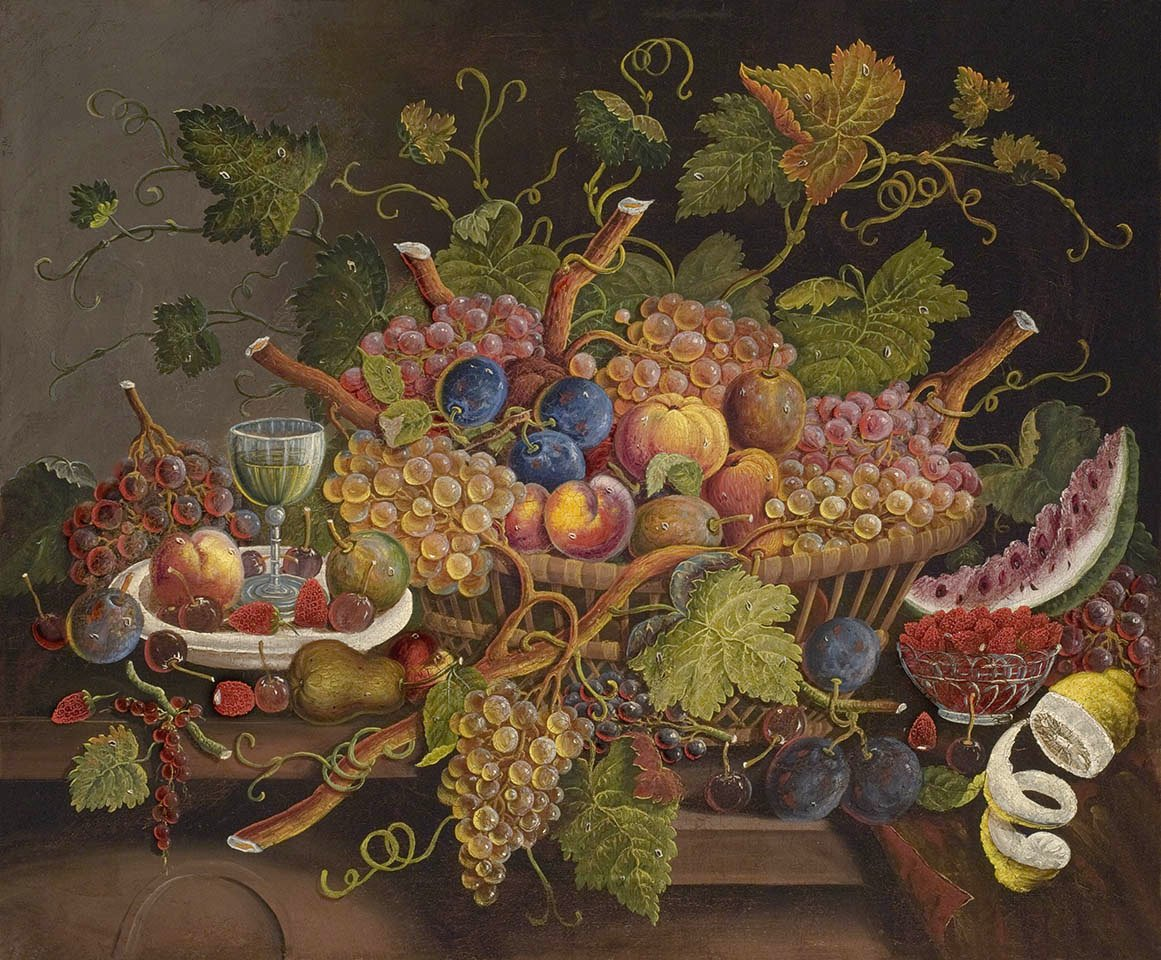
Stilleben "Tabletop Bounty"

Thomas Wightman (1811–1888) was an American painter of the nineteenth century, noted especially for his portraits and still life paintings.

== Life and career ==
Wightman was a native of Charleston, South Carolina. His parents were William and English-born Matilda Sandys Williams Wightman, described by the Southern Christian Advocate in 1882 as "in quite moderate circumstances," but "people of unusual intellect and intelligence, and of decidedly marked character"; his paternal grandfather, known as "Major Wightman" due to service in the American Revolutionary War, was a British native who operated a jewelry shop in the city. He was encouraged in his creative ambitions by his father, as was his brother John; another brother, William, would go on to become Methodist Bishop of South Carolina and president of Wofford College. His father was an amateur painter, Edward Greene Malbone painted miniature portraits of his parents, and the two men may have had some contact at that point. Otherwise, Wightman studied with Henry Inman in New York City; the date is not known, but might be around 1832, because he began contributing to the annual exhibitions of the National Academy of Design in that year. The catalog showed his address as 75 White Street, in a well-established neighborhood, indicating that he was already seeing some success as a painter. Somewhere between 1836 and 1841 he returned to Charleston for a visit, but he is known to have been back in New York by the summer of the latter year, for further study. He modeled his style of portraiture on that of Inman, and developed for himself a good clientele in both Charleston and New York. During the 1840s he traveled often between the two cities, but he was based in New York from 1837 to 1861; besides Charleston, he also frequently visited Augusta, Georgia, where his brother John operated a photographic studio and where his parents and sisters lived as well. He married a New Yorker, Isabella Jeanette Morris, in Augusta on February 19, 1837.

Wightman became an associate of the National Academy in 1849, and contributed fairly steadily to annual exhibitions until 1854. He rarely offered an address with his submissions, which may indicate that he was an itinerant at this time, although a number of addresses around New York are known from this period in his career. He usually showed only one or two works in each show, either portraits or still life paintings of fruit; he first exhibited a "fruit piece" in the 1844 exhibition. His still lifes indicate some familiarity with the genre as it had been previously practiced by Dutch artists. He spent a good deal of time in Spartanburg, South Carolina as well between 1854 and 1859, when his brother was president of Wofford College, and a number of portraits by him, many of family members, remain in the college collection.

The outbreak of the American Civil War caused a permanent break between Wightman, a Confederate sympathizer, and his wife, a Union supporter; the two never reconciled, although after the war Isabella went to live with their son William, who had served in the Confederate army. By the spring of 1861 the painter had returned south for good. He had moved to Augusta, Georgia by 1871, and assisted his brother John by hand-coloring photographs; he continued painting still life pictures as well, until his death in that city. He was buried in the family plot in Augusta's Magnolia Cemetery. A eulogy published in Academy minutes on the occasion of his death described him as an "excellent artist and a most worthy man". His son Horace also became a painter.

Two still life pieces by Wightman are today in the Johnson Collection of Southern Art in Spartanburg, South Carolina. A self-portrait, submitted upon his designation as Associate in 1849, remains in the collection of the National Academy.
