= Merrimon Cuninggim =

American minister (1911–1995)

- Born: May 11, 1911; Nashville, Tennessee, U.S.
- Died: November 1, 1995 (aged 84); Cockeysville, Maryland, U.S.
- Occupations: Clergyman, university administrator
- Spouse: Annie Whitty Daniel Cuninggim
- Children: Lee Neff Cuninggim; Penny Cuninggim
- Parent(s): Jesse Lee Cuninggim; Maud Merrimon Cuninggim
- Relatives: Margaret Cuninggim (sister)

Merrimon Cuninggim (May 11, 1911 – November 1, 1995) was a Methodist minister and scholar who, as Dean of the Perkins School of Theology, began the process of racially integrating Southern Methodist University. Under his leadership, Perkins would become the first integrated graduate school in the American South.

== Early life ==
Augustus Merrimon Cuninggim was born on May 11, 1911, in Nashville, Tennessee. His father, Jesse Lee Cuninggim, was a Methodist minister who moved Scarritt College from Kansas City, Missouri, to Nashville, and later taught at Vanderbilt University in Nashville. His mother was Maud Merrimon Cuninggim. His sister, Margaret Cuninggim, served as dean of women at the University of Tennessee and later at Vanderbilt University in Nashville.

Cuninggim graduated from Vanderbilt University and went on to earn a master's degree in English from Duke University, followed by a bachelor's degree and a master's degree in history from the University of Oxford and a Bachelor of Divinity and a PhD in education from Yale University.

== Career ==
In the 1940s, Cuninggim was Professor of Religion at Emory and Henry College in Emory, Virginia, and later at Denison University in Granville, Ohio. During the Second World War, he served as a chaplain in the United States Navy from 1944 to 1946. From 1946 to 1951, he was Professor of Religion at Pomona College in Claremont, California.

From 1951 to 1960, Cuninggim served as Dean of Perkins School of Theology at Southern Methodist University in Dallas, Texas. During his tenure, in 1952, he successfully led the drive to racially integrate, making it the first desegregated graduate school in the American South.

Cuninggim served as the executive director of the Danforth Foundation from 1960 to 1973.

Later, Cuninggim also served as the president of Salem College in Winston-Salem, North Carolina, from 1976 to 1979. He also served on the boards of trustees of his alma mater, Vanderbilt University and Duke University.

Cuninggim founded The Center for Effective Philanthropy in 1979. From 1979 to his death in 1995, he was a consultant for the Duke Endowment, the Lilly Endowment, the National Endowment for the Humanities, the Association of Governing Boards of Universities and Colleges, the Z. Smith Reynolds Foundation, and the Rockefeller Foundation. He also served as a consultant for the Margaret Cuninggim Women's Center at Vanderbilt University, named in honor of his sister.

== Tennis ==
Cuninggim was a ranked tennis player who competed at Wimbledon and Forest Hills. At Pomona College, he was both the tennis coach and the chairman of the Religious Department.

== Personal life and death ==
Cuninggim was married to Annie Whitty Daniel. They had three daughters, Lee Neff, Terry and Penelope Cuninggim.

He died on November 1, 1995, in Cockeysville, Maryland.

== Bibliography ==
- The College Seeks Religion (1948)
- Freedom's Holy Light (1955)
- Christianity & Communism (with others, 1958)
- The Protestant Stake in Higher Education (1961)
- Private Money and Public Service: The Role of the Foundation in American Society (1972)
- Church-Related Higher Education (with others, 1979)
- Letters to a Foundation Trustee: What We Need to Know About Foundations and Their Management (1991)
- Uneasy Partners: the College & the Church (1994)

Academic offices
Preceded by John H. Chandler	President of Salem College; 1976—1979	Succeeded by Richard L. Morrill
