= Lambuth Inn =

Historic hotel in North Carolina, US

- U.S. National Register of Historic Places
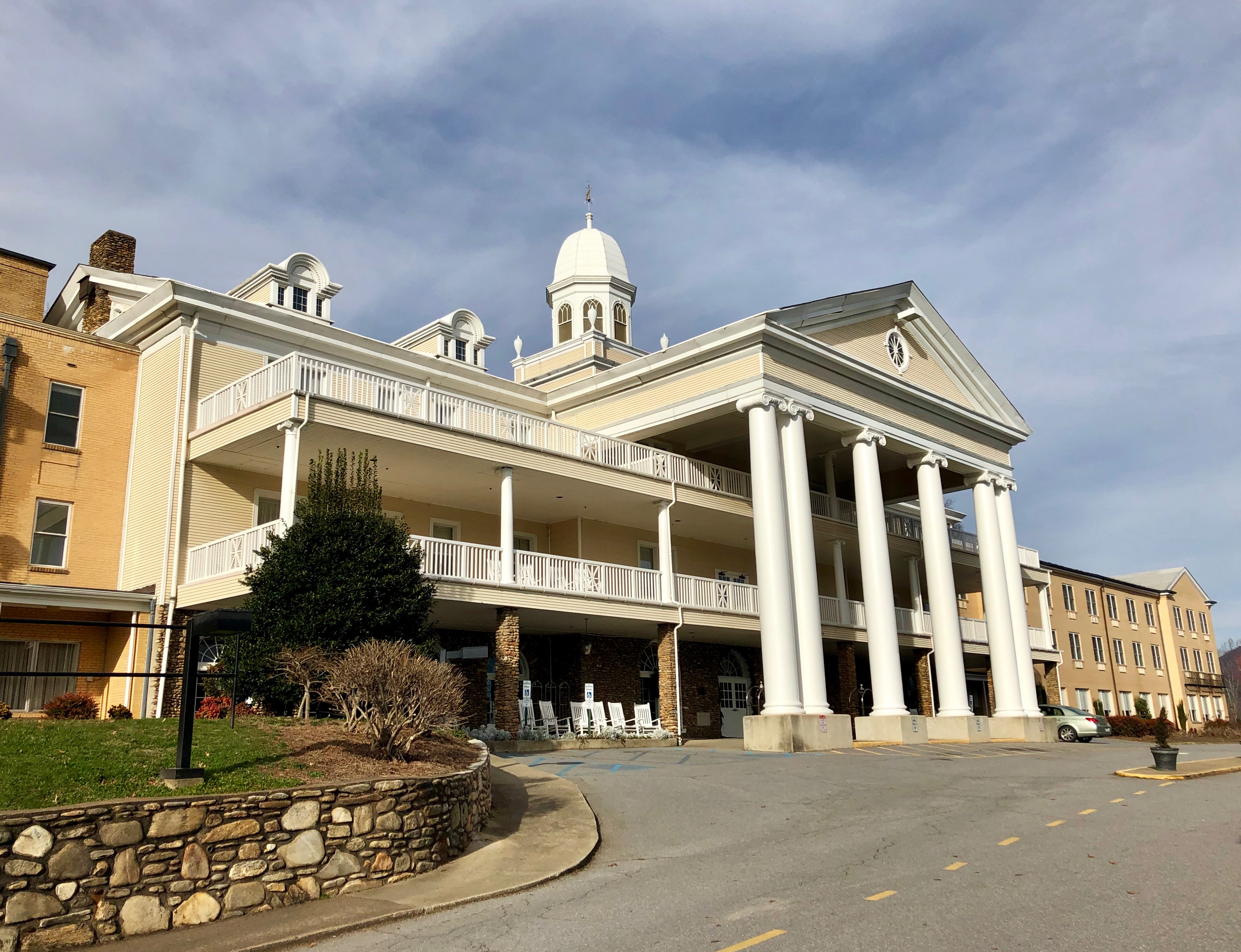
- Lambuth Inn, January 2019

- Location within North Carolina Location within the United States
- Location: Lambuth Dr., Lake Junaluska, North Carolina
- Coordinates: 35°31′44″N 82°58′1″W
- Area: 8.3 acres (3.4 ha)
- Built: 1921
- Architectural style: Classical Revival
- NRHP reference No.: 82003466
- Added to NRHP: July 29, 1982

Lambuth Inn, also known as Mission Centenary Inn and the Lambeth Hotel, is a historic hotel building located at Lake Junaluska, Haywood County, North Carolina. It was built in 1921, and is a large Classic Revival-style building consisting of a long rectangular block with three short rear wings. It is flanked by buff-colored brick additions extending symmetrically from each end, one made in 1956 and one in 1964. It features a massive pedimented portico with six three-story Ionic order columns. It was the main hotel facility of the United Methodist Church's Lake Junaluska Assembly. Renovation was done in 1983-1984 and 2018.

It was listed on the National Register of Historic Places in 1982.
