= American Southern Methodist Episcopal Mission =

American Southern Methodist Episcopal Mission was an American Methodist missionary society operated by the Methodist Episcopal Church, South that was involved in training and sending workers to urban centers in the U.S. as well as to other countries. The Board of Foreign Missions approved those missionaries who were sent to work in evangelical projects. Missions began in China during the late Qing Dynasty.

Local missionary initiatives by the Methodist churches in the South started as early as the 1820s. After creation in 1844 of the Methodist Episcopal Church, South, the Southern Methodist Church leadership took a different path than the Northern. It was not until 1878, for example, that the Southern Methodist General Conference formally recognized the Woman's Foreign Missionary Society. Lochie Rankin of Tennessee went to China as their first missionary, and she was the first unmarried woman to be sent abroad as a missionary by the Southern Methodists. Martha Watts was the second unmarried woman to be sent abroad by the Board of Foreign Missions; after arriving in Brazil in 1881, she established four schools.

Lucinda Barbour Helm started the Woman's Parsonage and Home Mission Society, with a Central Committee reporting to the Southern Methodist Board of Church Extension which was led by men. This group was separate from the Woman's Foreign Missionary Society which had started twelve years earlier and had missionaries in China, Korea, Brazil, Mexico and Cuba by that time. In 1906 the General Conference created the Woman's Missionary Council, merging the two women's groups despite frictions between the leaders. The leadership skills of Belle Harris Bennett gradually drew the various factions together. Another important contribution by Bennett's presidency was that Southern Methodist women gained full laity rights in 1919.

By 1910 the General Conference merged three mission boards into the Board of Missions (1/3 preachers, 1/3 laymen, 1/3 women, with all the Bishops and all the Officers as ex-officio members). Some notable medical missionaries from the American Southern Methodist Episcopal Mission include John Abner Snell and Walter Lambuth.

== See also ==
- Methodist Episcopal Church, South
- Protestant missionary societies in China during the 19th Century
- Timeline of Chinese history
- 19th-century Protestant missions in China
- List of Protestant missionaries in China
- Christianity in China
