= Belle Harris Bennett =

American church and ecumenical leader (1852–1922)

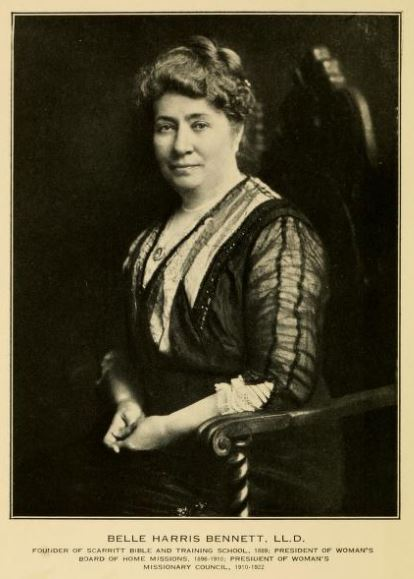
- Belle Harris Bennett, LL.D.
- Born: Isabel Harris Bennett; December 3, 1852; Foxtown, Madison County, Kentucky, U.S.
- Died: July 20, 1922 (aged 69); Richmond, Kentucky, U.S.
- Occupations: Suffragist, missionary, Southern Methodist Church leader, clubwoman

Belle Harris Bennett (December 3, 1852 – July 20, 1922) led the struggle for and won laity rights for women in the Methodist Episcopal Church, South. She was the founding president of the Woman's Missionary Council of the Southern Methodist Church. Much of her work including fundraising and organizational efforts to provide higher education for a new professional class of social workers and community organizers in the Southern Methodist Church in the U.S. and abroad. Her carefully collaborative support for African Americans and immigrants was considered radical at that time by Southerners. She was a suffragist and supporter of temperance as well.

== Early life ==
The younger daughter of the eight living children of Samuel Bennett and Elizabeth Chenault, Isabel Harris Bennett was born on December 3, 1852, at the family estate "Homelands" located in Madison County, Kentucky. Her siblings were: William (1835–1904, planter/financier), John (1837–1903, lawyer and State Senator), James (1839–1908, farmer/financier and woman suffrage activist married to suffragist Sarah "Sallie" Clay), David (1841–1909, physician and banker), Susan Ann (1843–1891, missionary and suffragist), Waller (1849–1933, banker/broker), Samuel Jr. (1858–1913, banker/broker).

Named after her paternal grandmother Isabelle Harris Bennett, the wife of a Kentucky Methodist circuit rider, she always used Harris or the initial H. whenever writing out her full name. It was through her mother's side of the family, the Chenaults, that she traced her lineage for acceptance in the Daughters of the American Revolution and the Colonial Dames of America.

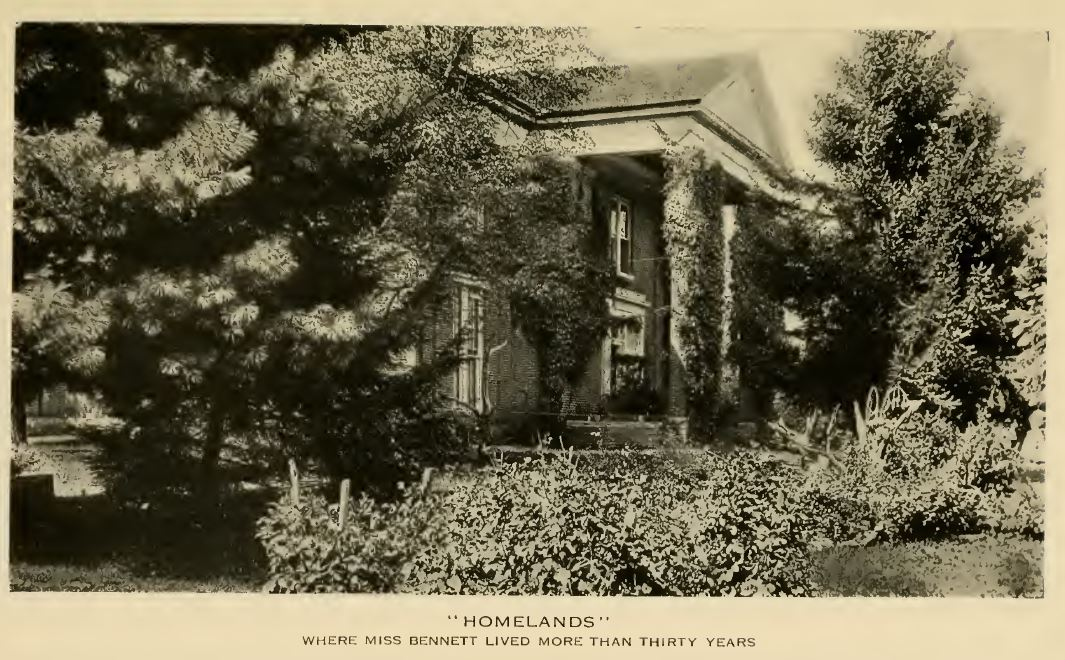
Photograph of "Homelands" in Madison County, Kentucky, circa 1928

As a child she walked to the local township school at Foxtown with her favorite brother Waller every day. Later in life, after graduating from Yale, Waller handled Belle's personal wealth, her philanthropic endeavors and helped with her mission society projects' finances. The whole family attended a small Southern Methodist church built on land donated by Samuel Bennett in honor of his preacher father, "Honest" John Bennett. Providence Church was the first Methodist church in Madison County, and Belle sang in the choir and taught Sunday School there.

At the age of 11, Belle was enrolled in Dr. Robert Breck's private school in Richmond, Kentucky, six miles away from "Homelands"—boarding in town during the winter months. She then attended Nazareth, near Bardstown, then a school at College Hill, Ohio. She received voice training in Cincinnati, Ohio where she also attended the theatre, opera, symphonies and art exhibits. Her schoolgirl friend Kate Helm, daughter of Gen. Benjamin Hardin Helm, described Belle at that time as being "very handsome, with tall graceful figure. She had blue eyes and ash blond hair (that unusual and very beautiful color). Her complexion was creamy white with delicate pink cheeks and lips - there was never a trace of anything artificial about it. This beauty, combined with her unusually fascinating manner of expressing herself, made her a rare personality.(quoted in MacDonell, 31)" Belle spent two seasons at Frankfort, the Kentucky state capital, with her brother John (he was a Senator at the time), and she spent a few weeks in New Orleans at Mardi Gras for the social scene there.

She spent the summer of 1888 attending assemblies at Chautauqua, New York where she met many women activists, scholars and religious leaders, including Lucy Rider Meyer, the founder of a training school in Chicago for women in the Northern Methodist Church to do missionary work.

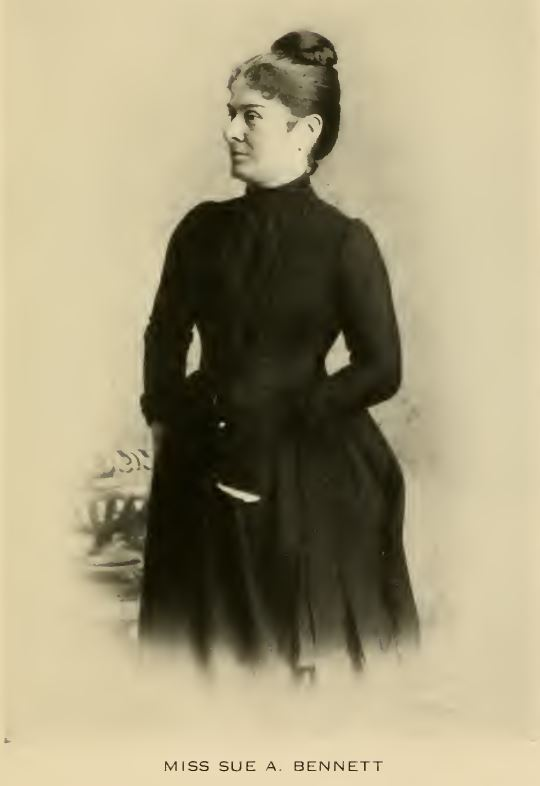
Portrait of Susan Ann Bennett of Richmond, Kentucky

In 1888 Samuel Bennett died, and Belle left "Homelands" with her mother, older sister and two younger brothers to live in a new house her mother built in Richmond. There, she ran the household while her sister Susan "Sue" Ann Bennett took on new initiatives with the Southern Methodist Church. One of Sue's most ardent wish was to organize a Methodist-affiliated school in south-eastern Kentucky - she had studied the region in 1886 as part of the Southern Methodist Woman's Department of Church Extension and found no churches of any denomination in many of the counties there. Her report at the Kentucky Conference helped to create a new role for women in the Southern Methodist Extension Department: the Woman's Parsonage and Home Mission Society, led by twelve women in a Central Committee. However, Sue's untimely death in 1891 temporarily put on hold those plans for a Methodist school in eastern Kentucky. The Central Committee invited Belle to come and take the place of her older sister Sue, and Belle's life as a leader in the Southern Methodist Church began.

In the mid-1890s both her brothers Waller and Samuel Jr. married and her mother died in 1897, so Belle went then to live with Waller and his wife, her schoolgirl friend Mary Burnam. However, her leadership in the Church grew so quickly that she moved out and rented rooms at a local hotel. In 1903 she went to live with her brother John when he was dying, but afterwards she returned to her hotel in Richmond as it had become an important center for her activism.

== Missionary and Reform activities ==
At the age of twenty-three, Belle attended a revival led by the evangelist Dr. Lapsley McKee and took a vow of church membership. She began visiting the poor in rural Kentucky around Richmond and then with her sister Sue organized a Sunday School in a poor neighborhood. After another powerful religious experience at a revival in Richmond with Rev. George O. Barnes, she spent the winter in Bible study and prayer circles in Louisville, Kentucky with her cousin Dr. J.W. Chenault and his wife's two sisters Mette and Harriet Thompson. As she wrote later in life: "it was so quickened and applied to my own heart I knew it meant God-given leadership for me. (quoted in MacDonell, 40)"

Belle attended a missionary meeting in Carlisle, Kentucky in 1887 with her sister Sue where they discussed the poor preparation of Methodist missionary workers. She kept this in mind when, at the end of the 1888 conference of Kentucky Woman's Missionary Society, she was elected the state president. Together with her friend from Louisville, Mrs. S.C. Trueheart (formerly Thompson) who was a delegate on the Southern Methodist Woman's Board of Foreign Missions, Belle traveled to Little Rock, Arkansas for the Board's annual meeting in 1889. There she was invited to speak about her idea of a missionary training school and the Board appointed her to the Committee on the Examination of Missionary Candidates to learn more about the status of women choosing to undertake this foreign service. By the end of the conference, Belle had garnered support to start gathering funding from throughout the Southern Methodist Church to establish a training school. Within one year Belle had secured the funding and a site donated by Dr. and Mrs. Nathan Scarritt of Kansas City, Missouri. The Scarritt Bible and Missionary Training School opened in the fall of 1892 with three students. Thousands were trained there in the next thirty years.

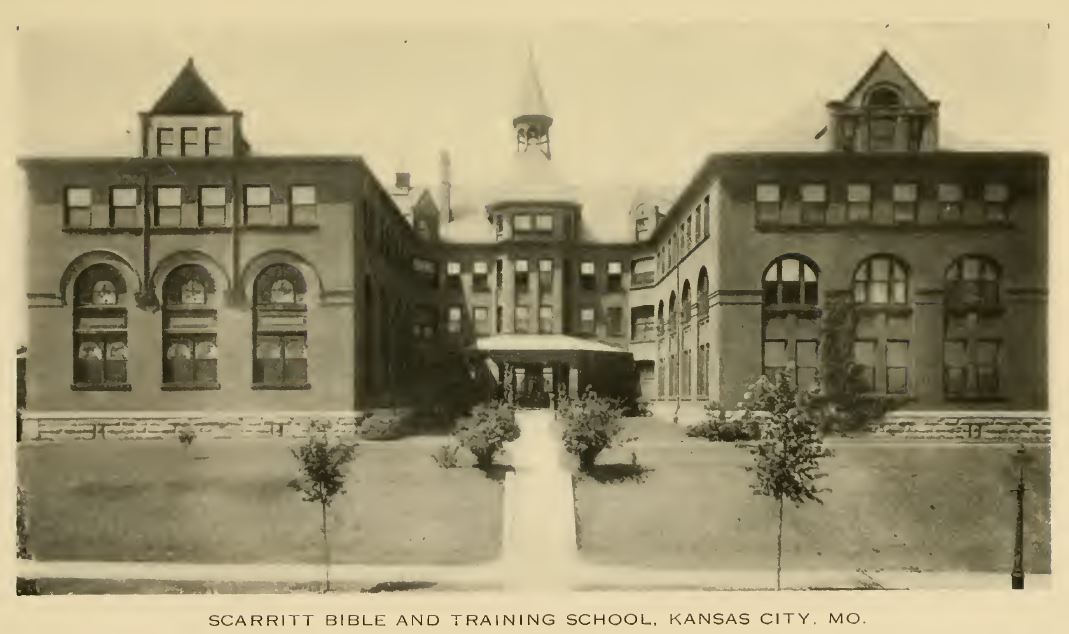
Photograph of the Scarritt Bible and Training School, Kansas City, Missouri (c. 1900)

In 1892, after the death of her sister Sue, Belle joined the Central Committee of the Woman's Home Mission Society – a club separate at that time from the Southern Methodist Woman's Foreign Missionary Society. Together with Mrs. Mary Bruce Alexander, a missionary in Brazil who traveled through Kentucky recruiting and organizing Methodist women's missionary societies, Belle created a Prayer Calendar in 1897 that was sent out by the Home Mission Society across the nation. Meanwhile, Belle continued fundraising for both the Scarritt school and her sister's plan for a school in southeastern Kentucky. She worked with Dr. Walter Russell Lambuth, Secretary of Foreign Missions, to talk with the citizens of London, Kentucky who matched the Woman's Parsonage and Home Mission Society's pledge of $20,000 for an endowment for a school. Belle recruited Rev. John J. Dickey a school principal from Jackson to come to London, Kentucky where they purchased a campus of 22 acres. The cornerstone of the new building was laid on June 25, 1896, and eight cottages to house students along with a dormitory for girls were built for what came to be named the Sue Bennett Memorial College.

Belle Bennett was elected president of the Woman's Parsonage and Home Mission Society in April 1896. This group reported to the Southern Methodist Board of Church Extension, led completely by men. Bennett lobbied to authorize the Woman's Home Mission Society to be governed by a Woman's Board with corresponding secretaries from each Conference Society. The new organization's leadership met in Texas in 1899 and Bennett was elected president. In response to the large increase in immigrants from the Pacific Rim in California, the Society started up night schools and organized Korean and Japanese Southern Methodist Churches. With the Society's headquarters in Nashville, Tennessee, the local City Mission Board established a settlement house which then served as an example to other cities—12 institutions by 1903. With some negative reactions by local preachers who felt the settlement houses were imitating Northern social workers and not evidencing what they considered women's Church work, Bennett recommended to her Societies that they rename them to Community House: Wesley Community House for white neighborhoods and Bethlehem Community House for serving people of color. Cooperatives for young, small-wage-earning women also became part of the Southern Methodist women's city mission program.

To maintain a consistency and high standard of service by the church women, Bennett sought support for the training of deaconesses. Her plans for the training of missionary women evolved when she spoke at the Woman's Session of the Methodist Ecumenical Conference during the summer of 1901 in London. There she visited the sites of the founding of the Wesleyan deaconess movement and various missions of London including the Salvation Army. At the Board of Missions meeting in 1903, she spoke about what she envisioned: "We need trained women, and need them badly. We need exceptionally fine women, as the specific calls from numerous pastors, congregations, and institutions show. ... We must have women filled with the Holy Ghost and with power -- power to study and to think; power to wield the sword of the Spirit to the saving of life, as the skillful surgeon uses his knife; power to work under authority and to exercise authority, to project work and develop work. We must have women who have power with God and man ... (quoted in MacDonell, 97)

In 1906 the Southern Methodist leadership created the Woman's Missionary Council and merged the Mission Home Society with the Woman's Foreign Missionary Society despite frictions between the women leaders. At its first meeting in St. Louis, April 20, 1911, Belle Bennett served as its founding president. For the nearly twelve years she served as president, the membership more than tripled and annual collections approached $1 million. New work was inaugurated in Africa, while the kindergarten and Bible woman's work in Japan was taken over and enlarged. The Southern Methodist women missionaries now had seven foreign mission fields in which to work. Wesley Houses and Bethlehem Houses increased in number and scope of work, and new work in rural districts began.

At the General Conference in 1910, Bennett organized a campaign to lobby the male leaders to grant women the full rights and privileges of the laity. The issue was referred to the Committee on Revisals and Bennett was invited to speak on behalf of the hundreds of memorials that had come into the General Conference. This was the first time in the history of the Southern Methodist Church that a woman was allowed to speak in a session of the General Conference. The measure lost that year, and again in 1914 when women on both sides of the debate were allowed to speak. Bennett appointed Miss Estelle Haskin as editor of a "Women's Council Bulletin" which sent out messages throughout the church about women's rights and the war efforts undertaken through women's service. At the 1918 General Conference in Atlanta, Georgia, the delegates voted 265 in favor and 57 against women's laity rights; and when the College of Bishops vetoed the measure, the General Conference sent the question to each of the Annual Conferences (approximately 40 Conferences constituted the Methodist Episcopal Church, South, at that time). The measure passed with a good majority, and women's laity rights were won by 1919. Bennett then started a Laity Committee that would organize a communications campaign throughout the South to make sure that a good number of women delegates would be sent to the General Conferences.

=== International work ===
After attending the World's Missionary Conference at Edinburgh, Scotland in June 1910, Bennett traveled through Italy then Cairo and Palestine learning about Christian holy sites and women's status in other countries. By July 1913 she was in Brazil where she traveled from Rio de Janeiro to Bello Horizonte and Petropolis for their Annual Conference. From the fall of 1916 through the spring of 1917, Bennett traveled in the Far East. She inspected the Foreign Missionary Society's work in China and began to expand the missionary schools and community houses there, including the Laura Haygood School for Girls at Suzhou. Bennett visited Japan and Korea - appointing a committee to study Wonsan in Korea, the site of a powerful Methodist revival movement (1903–1906), for an industrial and trade school. Bennett supported the cooperative effort of The Union Bible School already there where the Southern Methodists worked together with the Canadian Presbyterians to offer classes from 6 weeks to 3 months to Korean missionaries who would then go back to do work in their own communities.

In Panama in February 1916 for the Congress on Christian Work in Latin America, Bennett led one of the eight commissions: the Commission on Woman's Work. This commission produced a report on the status of women in Latin America and the role of Protestant churches in the eighteen counties, including pen-and-ink pictures. The report described women freedom fighters, educational advances for women, clubwork (especially the YWCA and Woman's Christian Temperance Union), promoted the use of native workers to enlarge services, observed the need for more Christian literature and cooperating agencies. The commission called for the appointment of trained women, more varied types of educational services, interboard cooperation, and greater cooperation between Protestant missionaries overall.

During the conflicts of World War I, Bennett contributed specific services related to her clubwork as well as her missionary career. She served as a member of the War Council of the Young Women's Christian Association, and she supported the Volstead Act. She sent out a public letter to Southern women about how the lessons of war could disrupt the horrors of bigotry and racism at home. In her view, this catastrophe was:

"the most inhuman and cruel war the world has ever known ... Men and nations came nearer and nearer to each other through the heart anguish of those days, and the Spirit of God found the waiting hosts a great training school where souls could be taught to look beyond race and color into other souls and know that to the remotest parts of earth all mankind was one great brotherhood." (quoted in MacDonell, 173)

In 1919 Bennett traveled with a Methodist Centenary commission to Europe where they toured the war-torn areas and established Centenary Methodist Churches and missions there.

=== Schools, community houses, college women's dormitories ===
Bennett was a great advocate for supporting local efforts to provide a more equal playing field for women wage-earners, people of color and non-English-speaking immigrants. Here are a few of the schools, city mission houses and state universities' dormitories built specifically for female students:

- Scarritt Bible and Missionary Training School established in 1892 in Kansas City, Missouri (in 1923 renamed the Scarritt College for Christian Workers and moved to Nashville, Tennessee)
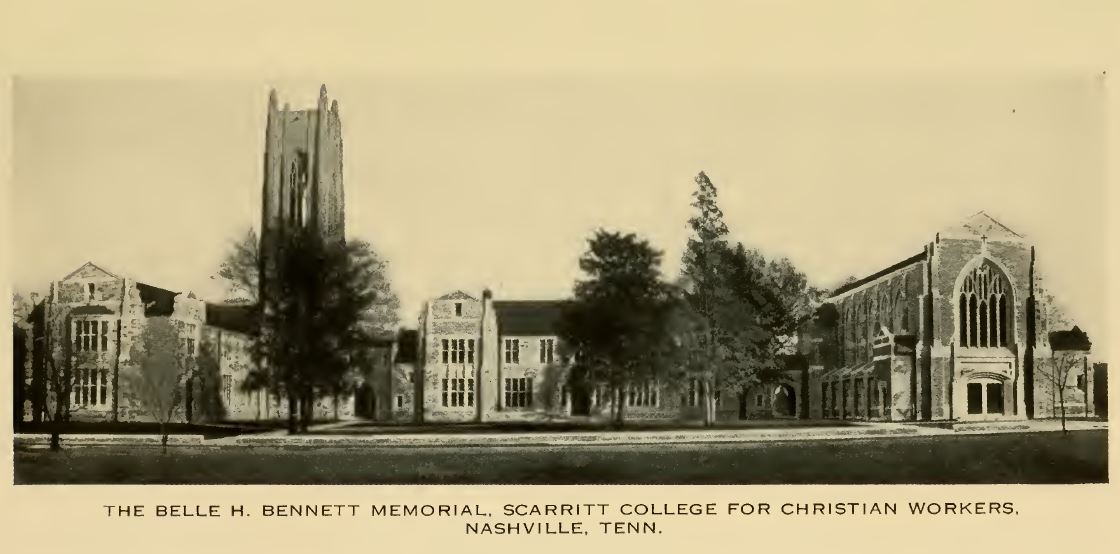
  Photograph of the Scarritt College for Christian Workers, Nashville, Tennessee (c1928)
- Sue Bennett Memorial College established 1896 in London, Kentucky
- At Nanking, China five cooperating mission boards established Gingling College for American-based classical higher education of Chinese women - Bennett funded the purchase of the property in 1913 and appointed her friend Miss Ella Hannawalt as head of the Department of Education. Bennett also established Nanking Bible Teachers' School and appointed Miss Ruth Brittain, a Southern Methodist from Alabama to serve as dean of the faculty.
- Woman's Christian Medical College, in Shanghai was supported by the unified efforts of four women's missionary boards due to persistent negotiations by Bennett, and after her death they honored her memory by naming after her a new clinical building in 1925
- Bennett College, in Rio de Janeiro, Brazil
- over 40 settlements and community cooperatives in U.S. cities: three in Florida (Tampa and Key West) to work with newly immigrated Cubans; St. Mark's Hall in New Orleans, Louisiana; the Immigrant Home at Galveston, Texas; cooperatives for women working in sweatshops included the Mary Elizabeth Inn (in San Francisco) and the Houston (Texas) Young Woman's Cooperative Home; Bethlehem Houses in Nashville, Tennessee and Augusta, Georgia to work with African-Americans.
- Methodist hall and dormitory at Paine College in Augusta, Georgia for housing and training African-American women in industrial/vocational courses
- Methodist dormitories for women on college campuses: College of Industrial Arts in Denton, Texas (Smith-Carroll Hall), State University in Norman, Oklahoma, State University in Austin, Texas, and State University in Columbia, Missouri
- Established in May 1915 the Madison County, Kentucky "Colored" Chautauqua and served as the Board's president for three years

== Suffrage activities ==
Their farm was situated within an area called Whitehall (a name later used for Clermont, home of the Cassius and Mary Jane Warfield Clay family). She was friends with Laura Clay, the founder of the Kentucky Equal Rights Association, who was only a few years older than herself; and, her older brother James married Sarah Lewis "Sallie" Clay who founded the Madison County Equal Rights Association.

She took on a leadership role in the Kentucky Equal Rights Association (ERA), becoming 3rd Vice President in 1895. When the Fulton ERA in western Kentucky needed a treasurer as it started up in 1897, Belle took on that job too. She spoke in favor of school suffrage at the 1910 Kentucky legislative hearing for women's right to vote, and she served on the Equal Rights Lecture Bureau that year. When she was interviewed for an article about “Women in the Churches” in The Woman's Journal, she made a direct connection between raising consciousness about women's rights in the Southern Methodist church hierarchy and women's political rights. In 1912 she began a two-year stint in serving on the KERA Executive Committee for the NAWSA, an important connection between the national and local suffragists during a time of great change in the movement. She sent in a news comment to The Woman's Journal in January 1912, “Much good work is being done in the South. Women and men are reading, thinking and talking in favor of woman suffrage as never before.” That year a Midwestern suffragists’ conference was held in Chicago, and she spoke on “Church Work.” The following year the Mississippi Valley Suffrage conference united with all the Southern states’ suffrage leaders to meet in St. Louis at the Buckingham Hotel from April 2–4, 1913. Belle spoke on "Southern Women and the Ballot."

For Belle H. Bennett, the passage of the Nineteenth Amendment was both a political and religious victory.

== Illness and death ==
Bennett's grueling work schedule took its toll and she grew very ill, sometimes not even being able to stand and speak at meetings. During the winter of 1920-1921 she put herself in hospital in Lexington, Kentucky for "rest and treatment" before she attempted one last meeting in Memphis with the Women's Council. She returned to Richmond, Kentucky to live with her niece Mrs. Annie Bennett Collins. For the first time since she was President, she did not attend the Council Annual meeting at San Antonio in April 1922, nor could she undertake the trip to Hot Springs, Arkansas to serve as a Kentucky delegate to the General Conference. She underwent an exploratory operation to determine the cause of her illness, but the prognosis was grim. She died at 40 minutes past twelve midnight on July 20, 1922, and the funeral service was held at the home of her niece two days later. Belle Harris Bennett is buried beside her sister, Sue A. Bennett, in the Richmond Cemetery.

== Honors and appointments ==
- Appointed as delegate to the International Missionary Convention, Edinburgh, Scotland, 1910; there she was elected to serve on the International Missionary Committee which convened in January 1921 at Garden City, then Lake Mohonk in New York in October 1921.
- On May 28, 1916, the faculty at Kentucky Wesleyan College in Owensboro, Kentucky conferred upon her the degree of LL.D. (Doctor of Laws) – the first woman to be honored so at that institution.
- Appointed as delegate to Congress on Christian Work in Latin America in Panama, February 1916, and selected as Chair of the Commission on Woman's Work
- Appointed as delegate to the International Missionary Council's first meeting fall 1921 at Lake Mohonk, New York
- Appointed as the only woman member of joint commission that planned the celebration of the 100th anniversary of Missions of the 2 great Methodisms, North and South
- Appointed to the U.S. Commission on Interracial Cooperation, and she helped create the Woman's Work department

== Works ==
- Bennett, Belle H. "An Appeal," Christian Advocate (Nashville), April 4, 1895.
- Bennett, Miss Belle H. "An Outline of the World-Wide Movement for the Liberation of Women." Nashville: Williams Printing Co., [1910].

== See also ==
- American Southern Methodist Episcopal Mission
- Methodist Episcopal Church, South
- Sue Bennett College

== Resources ==
- Bennett, Laura Marie (2009). Equal Privilege of Service: Women, Missions, and Suffrage in America, 1870-1934 (PhD). Princeton University.
- Blue, Ellen (2011). St. Mark's and the Social Gospel: Methodist Women and Civil Rights in New Orleans, 1895–1965. Knoxville: Univ. of Tennessee Press.
- Chandler, Douglas R. (1971). "Bennett, Belle Harris". Notable American Women, 1607-1950: A Biographical Dictionary, Volume 2. Radcliffe College, Cambridge: Belknap Press of Harvard U. pp. 132–134.
- Cobb, Mrs. J.B. (1900). The Story of the Years in China. Nashville, Tenn.: Woman's Missionary Council of the Methodist Episcopal Church, South.
- Knott, Claudia (1989). The Woman Suffrage Movement in Kentucky, 1879-1920 (PhD). University of Kentucky.
- L.F.C. (21 July 1922). "A Tribute to Miss Belle Bennett". The Richmond [KY] Daily Register. Library of Congress. Chronicling America: Historic American Newspapers. p. 4.
- MacDonell, Mrs. Robert W. (1928). Belle Harris Bennett: Her Life Work. Nashville, TN: The Woman's Section of the Board of Missions, Methodist Episcopal Church, South.
- McDowell, John Patrick (1982). The Social Gospel in the South: The Woman's Home Mission Movement in the Methodist Episcopal Church, South, 1886–1939. Baton Rouge: Louisiana State University Press.
- Tatum, Noreen Dunn (1960). A Crown of Service: A story of women's work in the Methodist Episcopal Church, South, from 1878-1940. Nashville, TN: Parthenon Press.
- Turner, Elizabeth Hayes (1997). Women, Culture, and Community: Religion and Reform in Galveston, 1880-1920. New York: Oxford University Press.
