= Albert Micajah Shipp =

American Methodist minister and university administrator (1819–1887)

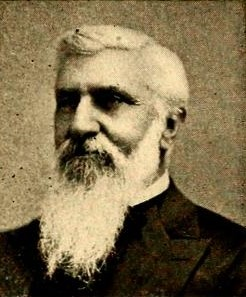

2nd President of Wofford College
- In office 1859–1875
- Preceded by: William May Wightman
- Succeeded by: James Henry Carlisle

President of Greensboro College
- In office 1848–1850

Personal details
- Born: June 15, 1819 Stokes County, North Carolina
- Died: June 27, 1887 (aged 68) Cleveland Springs, North Carolina
- Spouse: Mary Jane Gillespie
- Children: John Shipp, Sarah W. Shipp
- Parent(s): John Shipp, Elizabeth Wade Ogilvie
- Occupation: clergyman, university administrator

Albert Micajah Shipp (1819–1887) was an American Methodist minister and university administrator.

== Biography ==
=== Early life ===
Albert Micajah Shipp was born on June 15, 1819, in Stokes County, North Carolina. His father was John Shipp (1791-1820) and his mother, Elizabeth Wade Ogilvie (1795-1855). He graduated from the University of North Carolina at Chapel Hill in Chapel Hill, North Carolina.

=== Career ===
He joined the South Carolina Conference of the Methodist Episcopal Church, South in 1841. He served as a Methodist pastor in Charleston, Cokesbury, Santee, Cheraw, and Fayetteville. In 1847, he became the Presiding Elder of the Lincolnton District. He retired from preaching after his voice became too weak.

He served as the President of Greensboro College in Greensboro, North Carolina, from 1848 to 1850. He then taught English, French, and history at his alma mater, the University of North Carolina, in 1850-1851. In 1851, he joined the Board of Trustees of Wofford College in Spartanburg, South Carolina. He went on to serve as its President from 1859 to 1875, including during the American Civil War of 1861-1865 and the Reconstruction Era. However, he was forced to leave after he clashed with James Henry Carlisle (1825-1909), who served as the next President from 1875 to 1902.

In 1875, he became a professor of exegetical theology in the Biblical Department at Vanderbilt University in Nashville, Tennessee. From 1882 to 1887, he served as its dean. However, he was forced to resign by Bishop Holland Nimmons McTyeire (1824–1889). He retired in Marlboro County, South Carolina.

=== Personal life ===
He married Mary Jane Gillespie (1826-1880). They had a son and a daughter:

- John Shipp (1848-1888).
- Sarah W. Shipp (1864-1893).

=== Death ===
He died on June 27, 1887, in Cleveland Springs, North Carolina, at the age of sixty-eight.

== Bibliography ==
- The History of Methodism in South Carolina (1883)
