= Shackford Hall =

- U.S. National Register of Historic Places
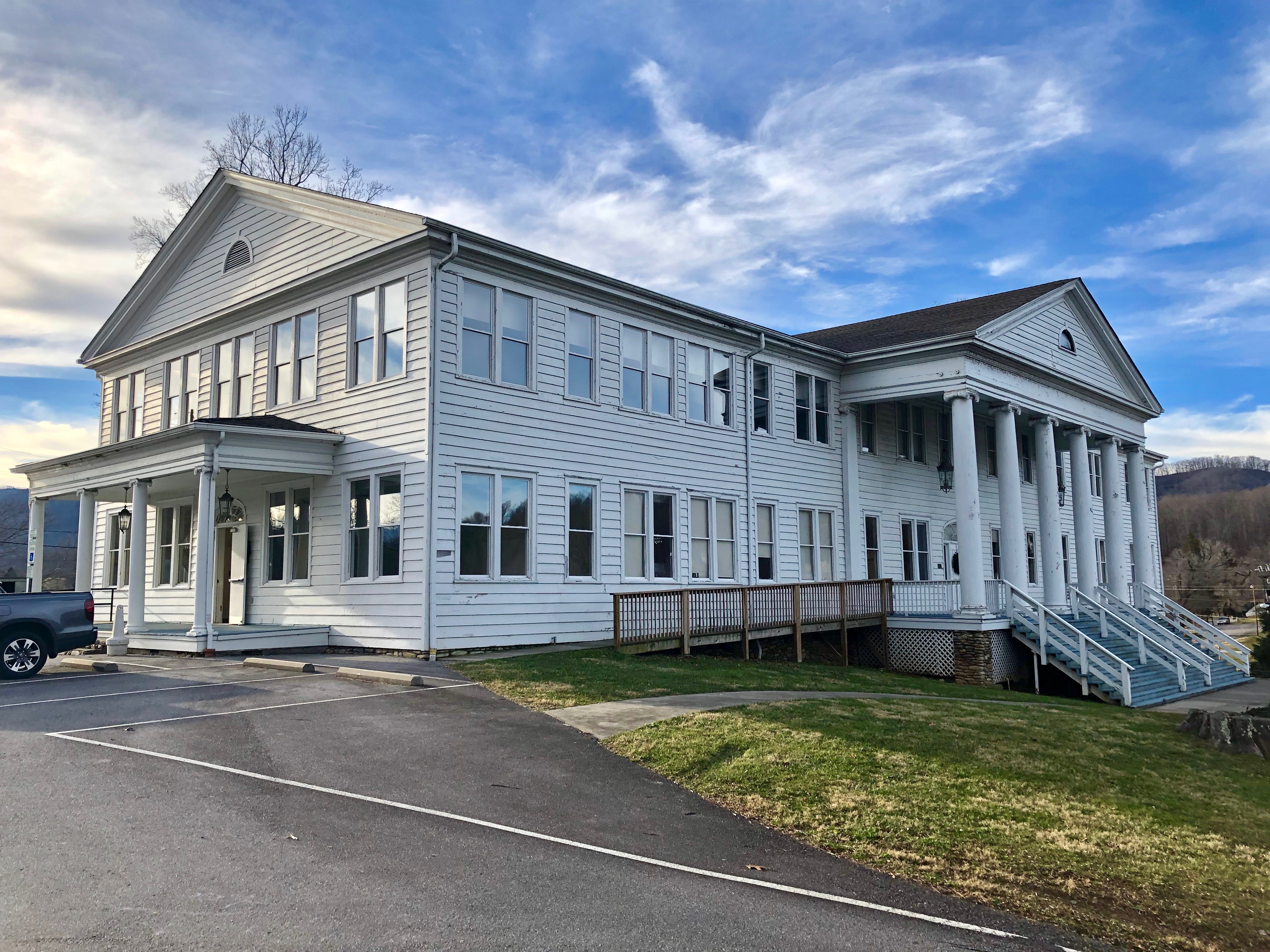
- Shackford Hall, January 2019

- Location within North Carolina Location within the United States
- Location: 80 Shackford Hall Rd., Lake Junaluska, North Carolina
- Coordinates: 35°31′28″N 82°58′41″W
- Area: less than one acre
- Built: 1923
- Architect: Baylor, Dr. J.A.
- Architectural style: Classical Revival
- NRHP reference No.: 01000419
- Added to NRHP: April 25, 2001

Shackford Hall is a historic educational facility located at Lake Junaluska, Haywood County, North Carolina. It was built in 1923, and is a large two-story, Classic Revival style building constructed of river rock and heavy timber. It has a T-shaped plan with cross gable roof and features a massive pedimented portico with six two-story Ionic order columns. It stands as one of the iconic structures in the Lake Junaluska Assembly.

It was listed on the National Register of Historic Places in 2001.
