= Scarritt College for Christian Workers =

- Scarritt College Historic District
- U.S. National Register of Historic Places
- U.S. Historic district
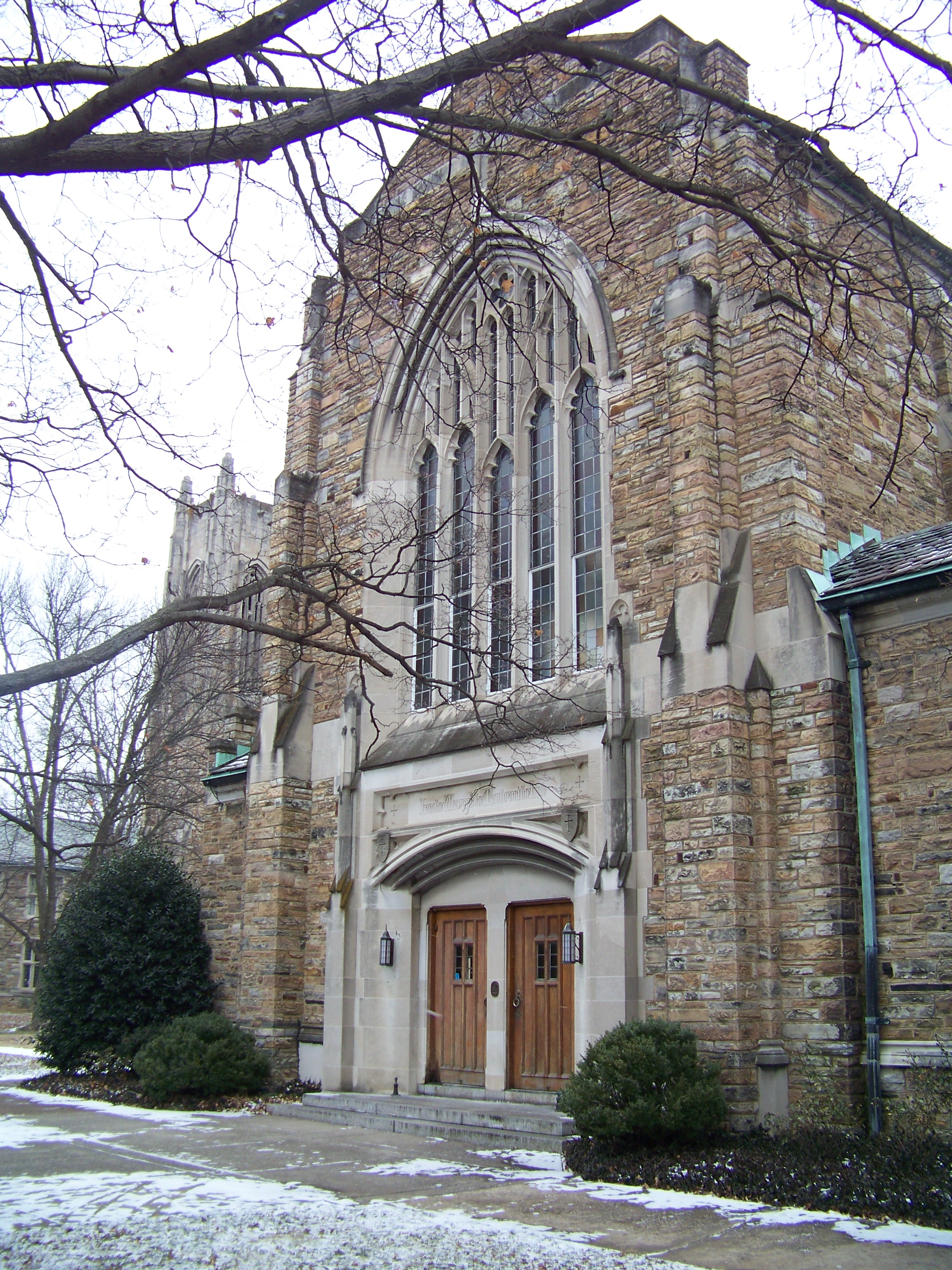
- The Wightman Chapel in the Scarritt College Historic District

- Location within Tennessee Location within the United States
- Location: 19th Avenue South, Nashville, Tennessee, US
- Coordinates: 36°8′46″N 86°47′48″W
- Area: 1.8 acres (0.73 ha)
- Built: 1925–1928
- Architect: Henry C. Hibbs
- Architectural style: Gothic Revival
- NRHP reference No.: 82003965
- Added to NRHP: August 26, 1982

Scarritt College for Christian Workers was a college associated with the United Methodist Church in Nashville, Tennessee, US. The campus is now home to Scarritt Bennett Center.

== History of Scarritt College (1892–1988) ==
The Scarritt College for Christian Workers started as the Scarritt Bible and Training School in Kansas City, Missouri, in 1892. Belle Harris Bennett, a Southern Methodist woman missionary leader from Richmond, Kentucky, presented the idea to create a training school for missionaries in the Methodist Episcopal Church, South. She imagined it to be similar to what Lucy Rider Meyer had created at the Chicago Training School for Home and Foreign Missions. The idea was agreed upon at the Southern Methodist Woman's Board of Foreign Missions annual conference in 1889. Board member Mrs. Nathan Scarritt of Kansas City, Missouri (the child of missionaries in India) was the first to offer a pledge for the new training school. Her husband, Reverend Nathan Spencer Scarritt later offered a $25,000 challenge and land in Missouri to begin the school. Within one year, Bennett had secured the matching pledges from throughout the Church and other Mission Boards. Despite some dispute within the Woman's Board, the Southern Methodist General Conference approved the plan, and work began in earnest in April 1891. The first building's cornerstone was laid in Kansas City on July 2, 1891.

In 1891 the Board of Managers of the Scarritt Bible and Training School elected Miss Laura Askew Haygood to be recalled from her missionary work in China to be the principal. But Haygood was not able to leave China so Miss Maria Layng Gibson, principal of a private high grade school in Covington, Kentucky was elected instead in 1892. The first building was dedicated on September 14, 1892, and school officially opened with three students. As that first year progressed, school enrollment increased to thirty-four, fourteen of whom were boarders. Miss Layona Glenn was the first graduate in the spring and she was sent to Brazil to serve as a missionary. Curriculum included church history, history of missions, religious pedagogy, methods of work, phonetics, hymnology, and bookkeeping. A small hospital was started up for the training of nurses but was discontinued in 1905 due to difficulty in financing it.

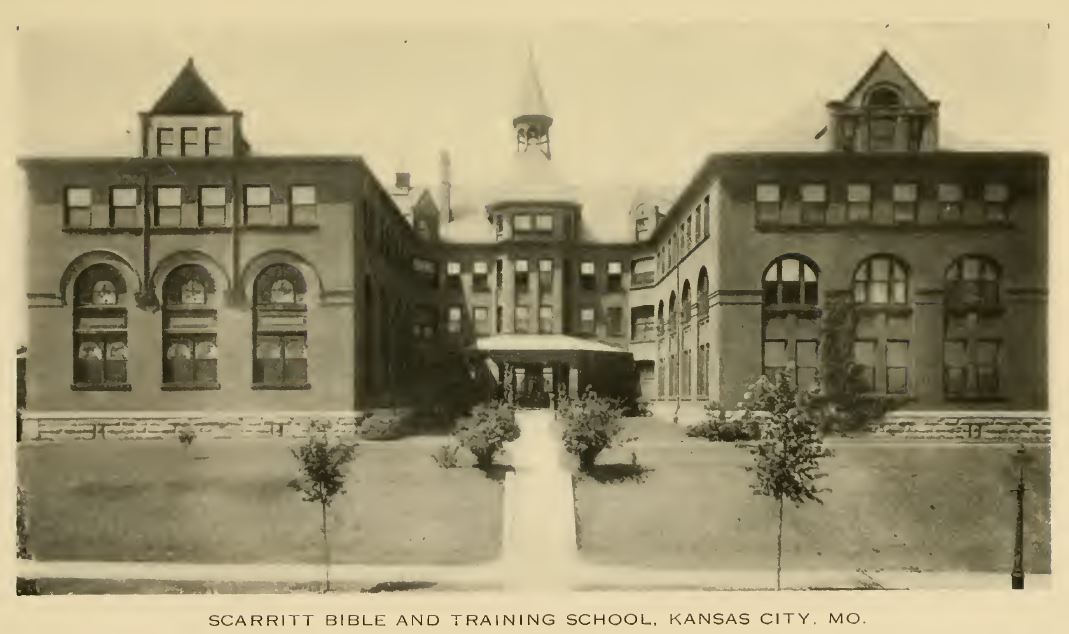
The Scarritt Bible and Training School, Kansas City, Missouri (c 1900)

In 1895 Bennett turned over $52,394.58 collected so far by her fundraising speeches and $20,000 given by the Conference Societies for the Belle Bennett Chair (to maintain the Bible Department). The Women's Board also allocated $55,000 for an endowment fund for scholarships, lectureships and a small student loan fund. In 1902 the Southern Methodist General Conference agreed to the plan presented by Belle Harris Bennett to establish the deaconess movement and the Scarritt Bible and Training School blossomed under the new standards for professionalizing women lay leaders.

In 1918 Dr. Edwin F. Cook, formerly Foreign Secretary for the Board of Missions, was elected president of the School with the task of finding a way to enlarge the school and expand its offerings. He resigned after one year to become a secretary of the Board of Education, and his replacement was Methodist minister Jesse Lee Cuninggim.

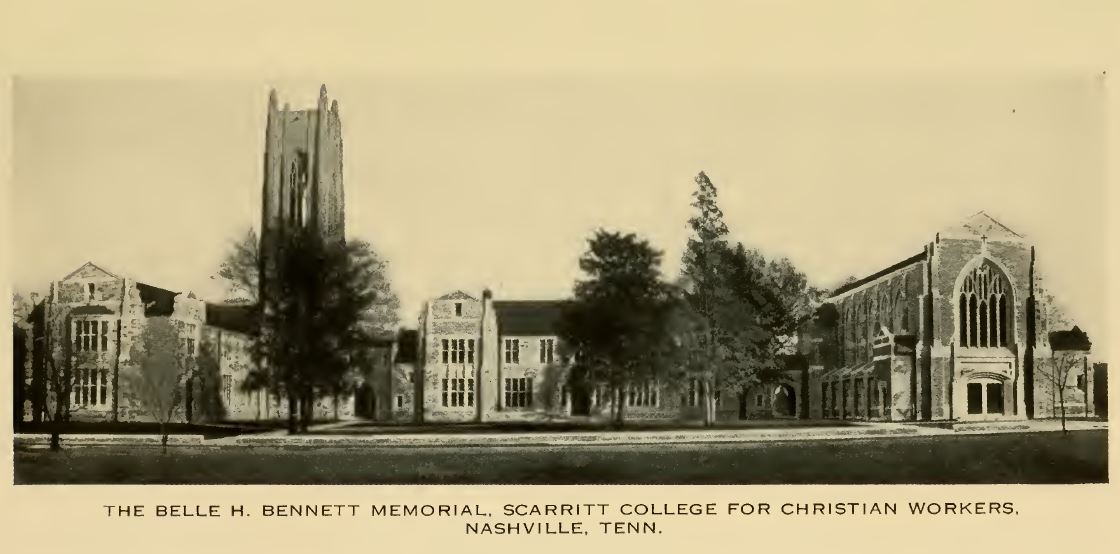
The Scarritt College for Christian Workers, Nashville, Tennessee (c1928)

By 1924, under President Cuninggim's leadership, the college was moved to Nashville, Tennessee and rechartered under the name of Scarritt College for Christian Workers. Architect Henry C. Hibbs, who had designed the campus buildings of the George Peabody College for Teachers, designed the campus buildings in the late Gothic Revival architectural style. Construction of the Belle Bennett Memorial, which included Scarritt Hall, Bennett Hall, Wightman Chapel and the Tower, as well as the Susie Gray Dining Hall began in 1925. Built with Crab Orchard stone, it was completed in 1928. The Wightman Chapel was named in honor of Maria Davies Wightman, a women's rights activist in Louisiana and the wife of Bishop William May Wightman. Sartain Lanier, the chairman of Oxford Industries, married his wife in Wightman Chapel in 1934.

By the 1930s, the college "offered a bachelor's degree and graduate education in the fields of community and family service, social work, and religious education." From 1940 into the 1960s, the campus was expanded with the construction of six additional buildings. During the civil rights movement, Martin Luther King Jr. spoke in Wightman Chapel. In 1973, J. Richard Palmer, formerly of Berea College, was brought in as president to increase fundraising and enrollment. However, he resigned in 1977 due to internal politics.

The college became known as the Scarritt Graduate School from 1981 to 1988. During that time, it was a graduate school for Church Music and Christian Education. The school closed in 1988.

== Architectural significance ==
Several of the campus buildings have been listed on the National Register of Historic Places since August 26, 1982. The historic district is made up of the original campus buildings built before 1940: Administration Building, Memorial Tower, Susie Gray Dining Hall, Bennett Hall, and Wightman Chapel.

== Civil rights history ==
=== Desegregation ===
Scarritt College welcomed its first black students—Leila Robinson and DeLaris Johnson—in 1952, making it one of the first private, predominately white colleges in Tennessee to desegregate. Robinson and Johnson became active in student life on campus: Robinson served as editor of the yearbook, and Johnson became Treasurer of the student council 1953–54. Scarritt College's desegregation also prompted Vanderbilt University, which is located across the street, to reconsider its policies on race and integration, since the two schools were affiliated through Joint University Center and Library at the time.

=== Visit from Martin Luther King Jr. ===
On April 25, 1957, Martin Luther King Jr. spoke in Wightman Chapel at Scarritt College to the Conference on Christian Faith and Human Relations. The Conference on Christian Faith and Human Relations was hosted by Scarritt College and Vanderbilt Divinity School and co-sponsored by the Tennessee Council of Churches and the Fellowship of Southern Churchmen. “The salvation of the world lies in the hands of the maladjusted,” King said, “…the challenge to you is to be maladjusted to the evils of segregation [...], the madness of militarism, and the self-defeating method of physical violence.” Dr. King spoke on the last day of the conference and addressed some 350 church leaders, the day after receiving the Social Justice Award from the Religion and Labor Foundation in New York. King's speech was titled, "The Role of the Church in Facing the Nation’s Chief Moral Dilemma".

=== Student civil rights activism ===
==== Campus Grill boycott (1963) ====
In the spring of 1963, Lorine Chan, a Scarritt College student from Fiji, was denied service at the Campus Grill, a local “greasy spoon.” Around the same time, Rev. Abel Muzorewa and his wife, Maggie Chigodora, arrived in Nashville to attend Scarritt College. The local Methodist church near Scarritt College who had sponsored them refused membership to them upon their arrival in Nashville because Maggie was black. In response to these events, Gerry Bode, Sue Thrasher, Archie Allen, Mary Pless, and others formed the Christian Action Fellowship to work against racial discrimination. They also joined students at Peabody College and Vanderbilt University to form the Joint University Council on Human Relations. The Joint University Council on Human Relations coordinated a boycott of the Campus Grill, coordinating with black student leaders, John Lewis and Lester McKinnie. By November, Vanderbilt, Peabody and Scarritt College students and faculty organized a boycott of the restaurant until it served black students.

==== Downtown demonstrations (1964) ====
Following the Campus Grill boycott, Scarritt College students continued to participate in civil rights demonstrations. In 1964, demonstrators, led by John Lewis and Lester McKinnie, organized demonstrations focused on establishments that refused to desegregate, including Krystal, Morrison's Cafeteria, and the Tic Toc restaurant. During one demonstration, on April 27, 1964, Archie Allen was attacked by the employees and knocked down on the sidewalk while attempting to talk with Tic Toc employees. On April 28, Scarritt College student, William Barbee, was severely beaten by police while Barbee was holding onto a light pole. Barbee was arrested on disorderly conduct charges and later admitted to Hubbarb Hospital. In addition to a concussion, the beatings Barbee endured resulted in injuries from which he suffered for the rest of his life.

== Scarritt Bennett Center (1988–present) ==
After Scarritt College closed, the campus was purchased by the Women's Division of the United Methodist Church, who formed Scarritt Bennett Center, a nonprofit organization that operates on the campus today. Scarritt Bennett Center is a conference, retreat, and education center that seeks to carry on the legacy of the Scarritt College students, faculty, and staff. Scarritt Bennett Center's mission is to create space where individuals and groups engage each other to achieve a more just world. Scarritt Bennett Center's programming focuses on the empowerment of women, eradication of racism, prophetic justice, radical hospitality, sacred rituals, spiritual enrichment, and transformative education.
