= Henry C. Hibbs =

American architect (1882–1949)

- Born: January 26, 1882; Camden, New Jersey
- Died: March 3, 1949 (aged 67); Nashville, Tennessee
- Education: University of Pennsylvania
- Occupation: Architect
- Spouse: Agnes Hibbs
- Children: 4

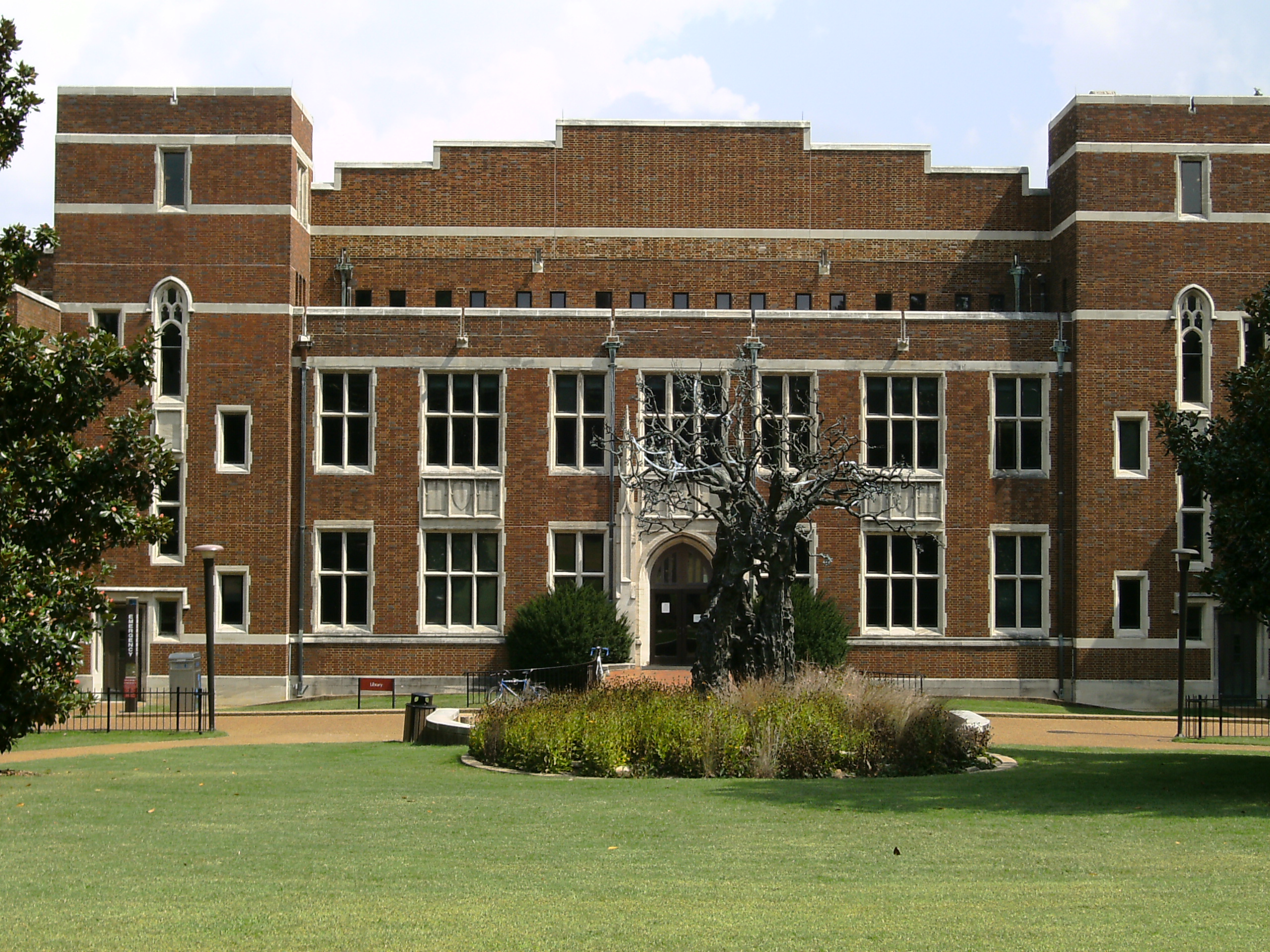
Central library of Vanderbilt University seen in 2009; designed by Hibbs

Henry C. Hibbs (1882–1949) was an American architect. He designed many buildings on the campus of Vanderbilt University in Nashville, Tennessee, as well as Davidson College in Davidson, North Carolina. He also designed the libraries of Fisk University in Nashville and the University of Tulsa in Tulsa, Oklahoma. He was the recipient of several awards for his architectural work.

== Early life ==
Henry Closson Hibbs was born on January 26, 1882, in Camden, New Jersey. He graduated from the University of Pennsylvania, where he received a Bachelor of Science in architecture.

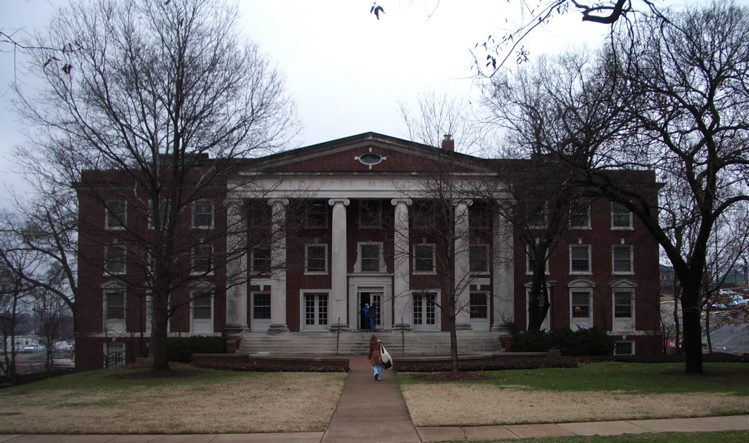
Confederate Memorial Hall, Vanderbilt University, designed by Hibbs as seen in 2006

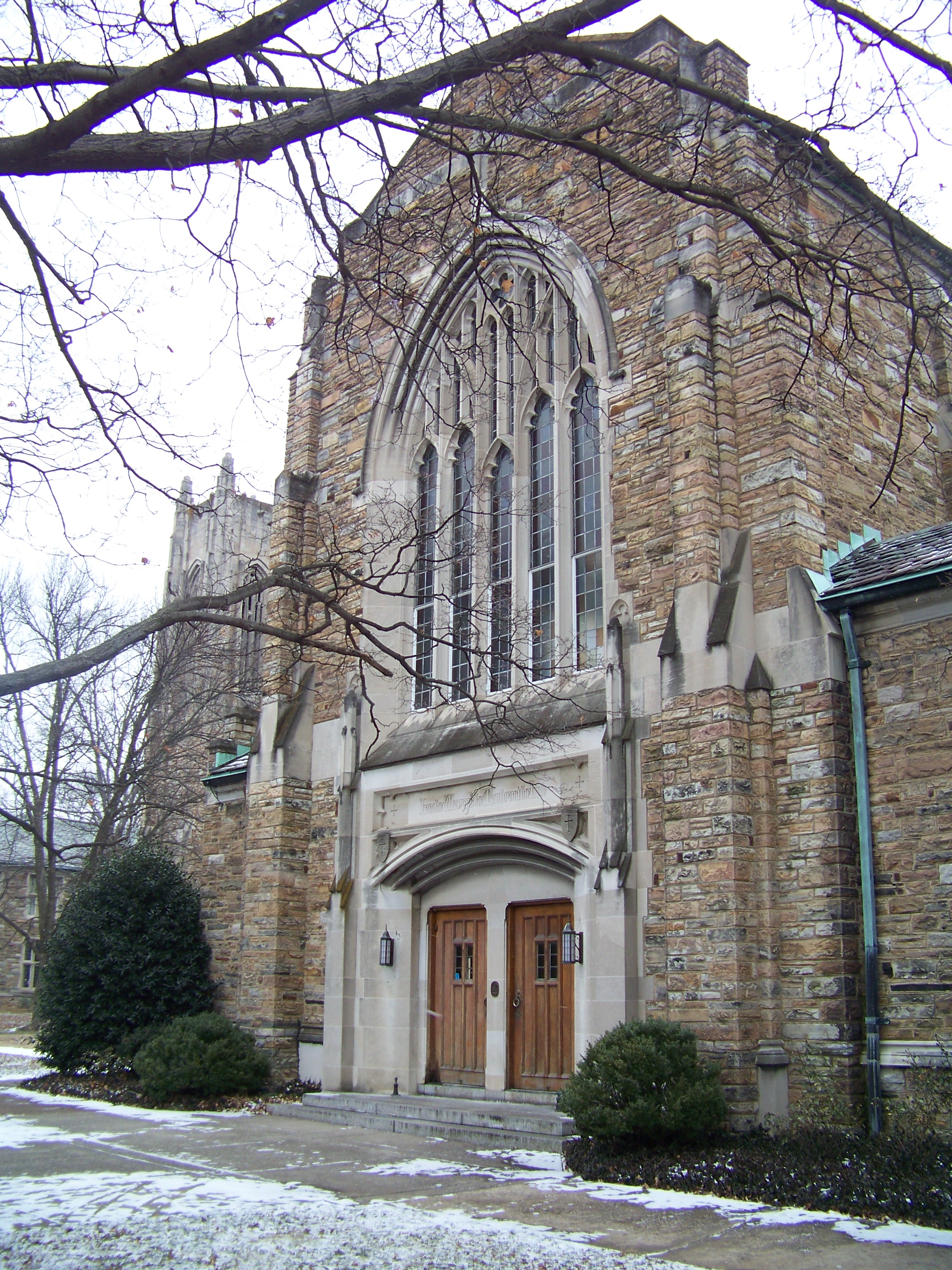
Wightman Chapel, Scarritt College, 19th Ave., south Nashville, designed by Hibbs, as seen in 2009

== Career ==
He worked for Cope and Stewardson in Philadelphia, Pennsylvania a year then moved to New York City to work at George B. Post and Sons in 1904–1906 and then for D. Everett Waid in 1908–1909. He then worked four years at Van Vleck & Goldsmith Architects where he designed a post office and a theater in Westfield, New Jersey.

Hibbs moved to Nashville, Tennessee, to design Peabody College in 1914. He also designed the original campus of the Scarritt College for Christian Workers, now the Scarritt Bennett Center, as well as several buildings on the campus of Vanderbilt University: the original Library, the Neely Auditorium, Confederate Memorial Hall, Buttrick Hall, Calhoun Hall and Garland Hall. Additionally, he designed the private home of James Hampton Kirkland, second Chancellor of Vanderbilt University.

In Nashville, Hibbs went on to design many buildings, including the Nashville Electric Building and the Fisk University Library in Nashville. Meanwhile, he designed the campus of Southwestern University (now known as Rhodes College) in Memphis, Tennessee, the University of Tulsa Library in Tulsa, Oklahoma, and Davidson College in Davidson, North Carolina.

Hibbs was a Fellow of the American Institute of Architects and the first president of its Tennessee chapter. In 1921, he was the author of the first bill regulating architectural practice in Tennessee. In 1929, he received the Milton S. Binswanger gold medal for excellence in ecclesiastical architecture with Scarritt College and the Dr. Charles Diehl gold medal in excellence in educational institutional buildings with Southwestern University, a.k.a. Rhodes College.

== Personal life and death ==
Hibbs was married to Agnes Hibbs, and they had four daughters: Elizabeth Burton, Isabel Robertson, Harriet Twinning, and Agnes Allison.

Hibbs was a thirty-second degree Mason. In 1916, he was elected a Deacon of the First Presbyterian Church, Nashville, Tennessee. He was a member of the Old Oak Club, an eating club in Nashville started in 1887 by Herman Justi and still active today. He served as its president in 1930. He was also a member of the Coffee House Club in Nashville and he sat on the Board of Directors of the Nashville Y.M.C.A.

Hibbs died of a heart attack at the Saint Thomas Hospital in Nashville on March 3, 1949.
