= Togorō Uzaki =

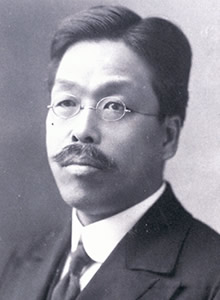
Togorō Usaki

Togorō Uzaki (鵜崎 庚午郎, Uzaki Togorō; April 17, 1870 – April 3, 1930) was a Japanese pastor, an educator and an editor. He was bishop of the Japan Methodist Church for 12 years.

== Early life and education ==
Uzaki was born in Himeji in Hyōgo Prefecture. His father was the China scholar Kyūhei Uzaki. In 1886, he entered Kōbe Palmore English Academy and was baptized the following year by American missionary Walter Russell Lambuth. He became a Methodist, joining the Japan Conference of the Methodist Episcopal Church, South.

He studied English theology and graduated from Kwansei Gakuin University in 1891. He went on to study at Vanderbilt University in the United States.

== Career ==
Uzaki taught at several schools including Sankō, Kwansei Gakuin, and Aoyama Gakuin, and was a pastor in Kobe, Hiroshima, Osaka and Kyoto. He later became principal at Nagasaki Chinzei Gakuin.

In 1905, Uzaki became editor-in-chief of Gokyo, the journal of the Japanese Methodist Church.

In 1913, he became the bishop of the Japanese Methodist Church. Serving for three terms, he represented Japan at international missionary conferences. He was a delegate to the Fifth Ecumenical Conference, London, England, 1921. He was a delegate also to the Council of Religions in Tokyo.

== Personal life and death ==
He died April 3, 1930, on a train after having been stricken with apoplexy.
