= Walter Russell Lambuth =

Chinese-born American bishop (1854–1921)

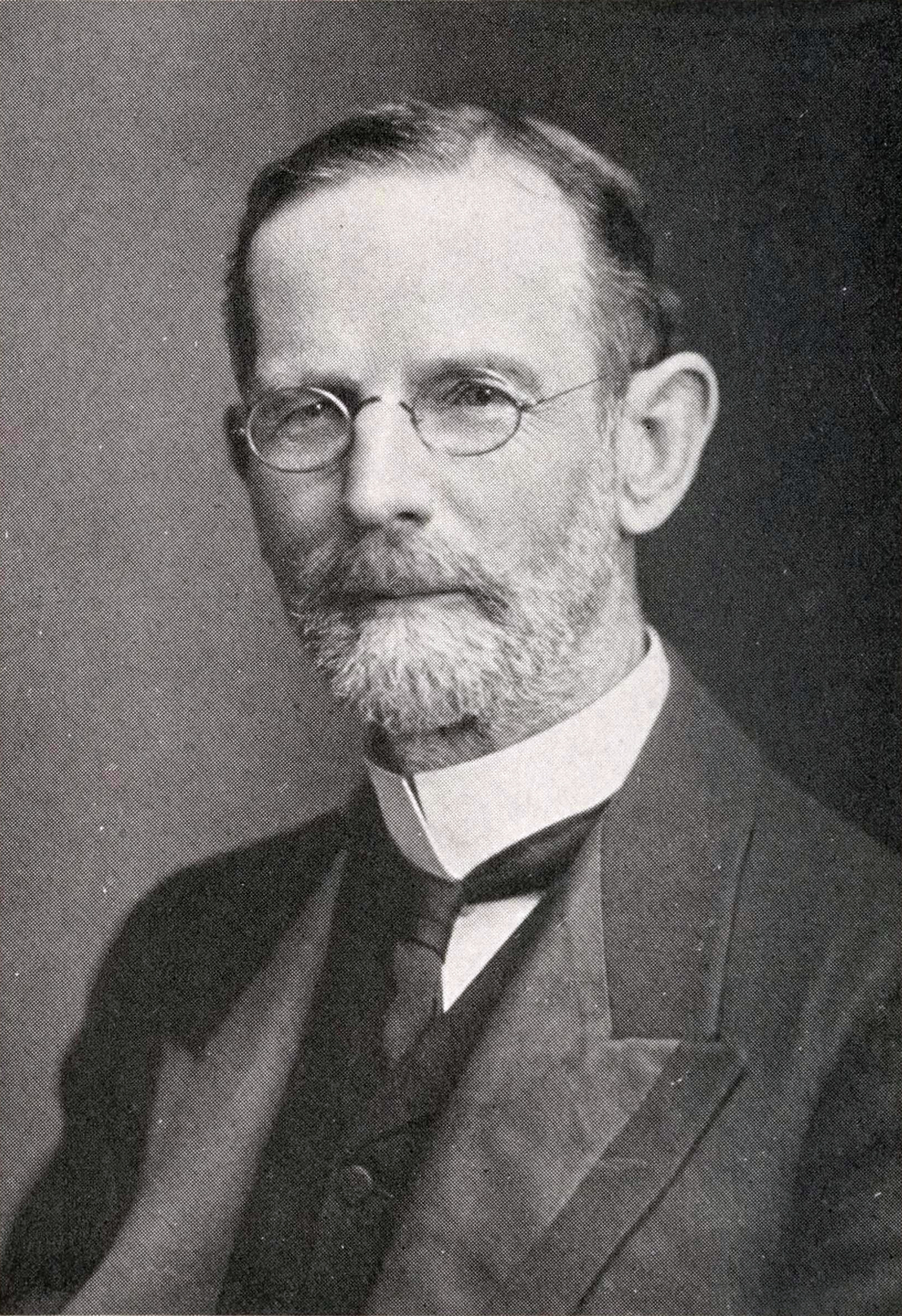
- Born: November 10, 1854; Shanghai, China
- Died: September 26, 1921 (aged 66); Yokohama
- Occupation: Methodist bishop

Walter Russell Lambuth (November 10, 1854 – September 26, 1921) was a Chinese-born American Methodist Christian bishop who worked as a missionary establishing schools and hospitals in China, Korea and Japan in the 1880s.

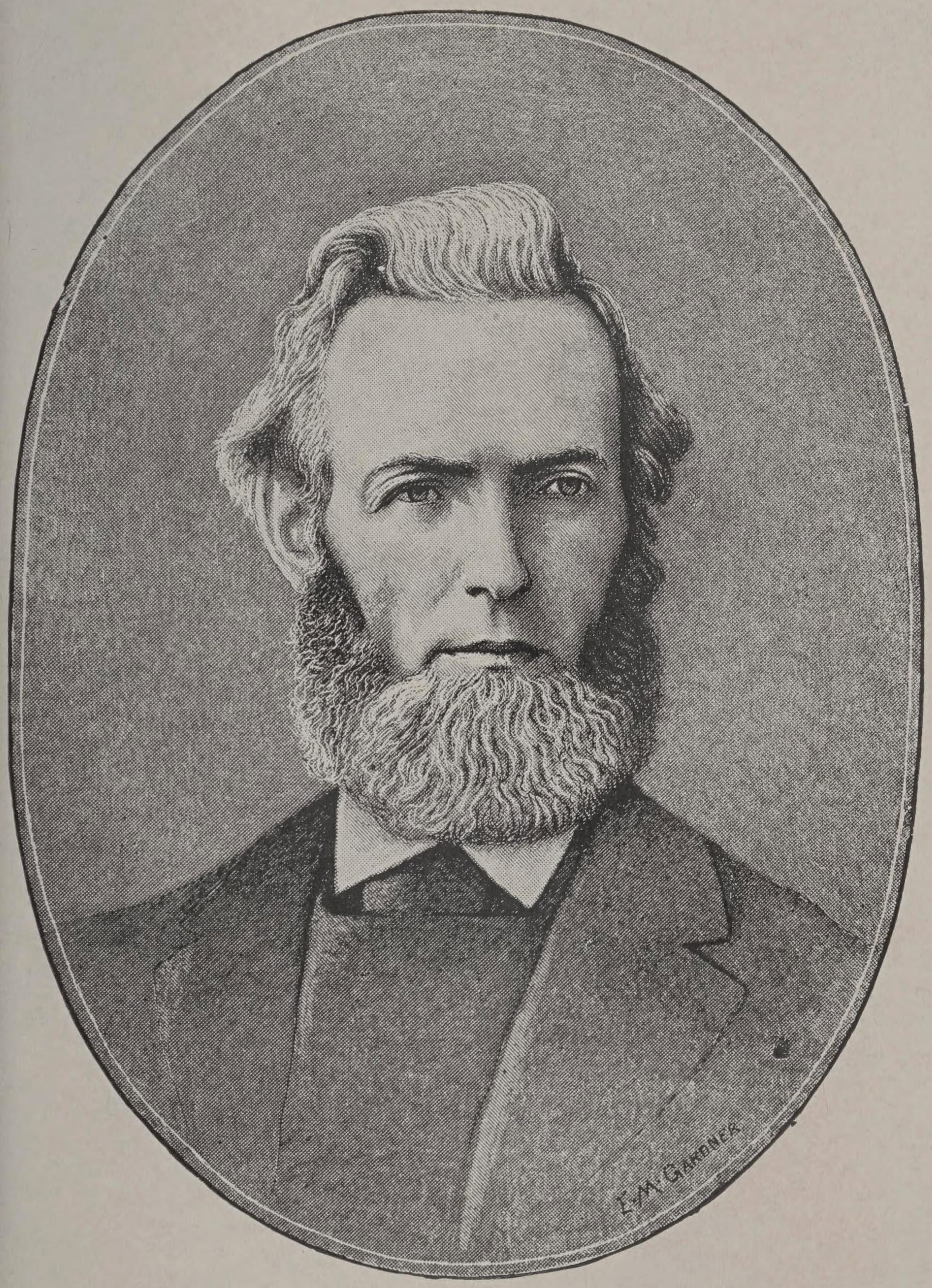
James William Lambuth

== Birth and family ==
Born in Shanghai, China as the eldest son of James William Lambuth and Mary Isabella McClellan, he was sent to his relatives in Tennessee and Mississippi for his early education. Walter's parents were pioneering missionaries in China. Together they also founded the mission work of the Methodist Episcopal Church, South in Japan. Walter's grandfather had been a Preacher in the Mississippi Annual Conference. Walter's great-grandfather, the Rev. William Lambuth, was a Preacher in the Holston Annual Conference (admitted in 1795).

== Education ==
Walter graduated from Emory and Henry College in 1875, and later received theology and medical degrees from Vanderbilt University.

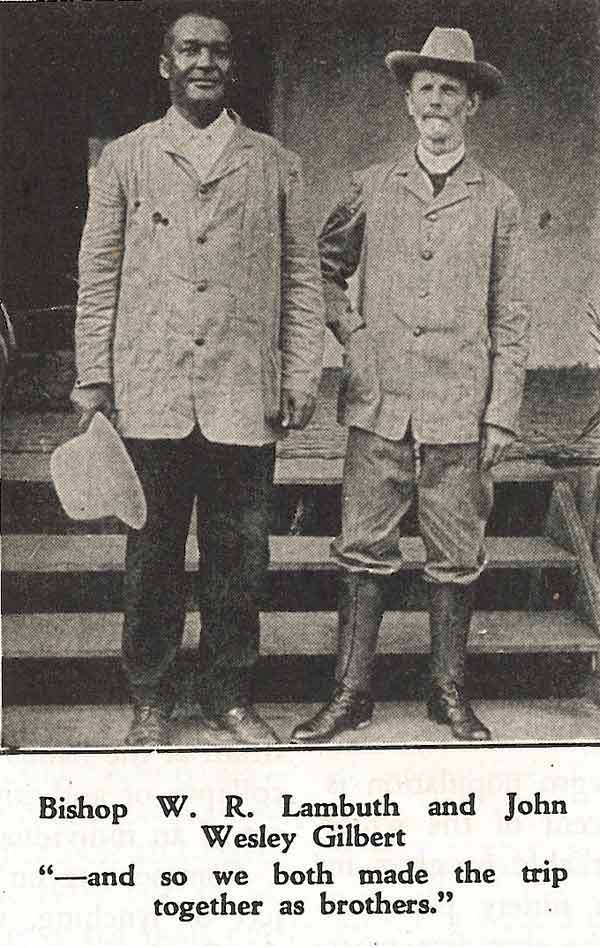
Walter Russell Lambuth and John Wesley Gilbert on their mission to the Belgian Congo.

== Ordination and Ministry ==
Bishop W. M. Wrightman appointed Walter R. Lambuth as the first pastor of Woodbine United Methodist Church in Nashville, Tennessee in 1875. This was Rev. Lambuth's first and only pastorate. Lambuth was ordained an elder in the Tennessee Conference of the Methodist Episcopal Church, South, and returned to China with his wife Daisy Kelly as a medical missionary in 1877. In 1883 with support from the Methodist Church Dr. Lambuth, alongside William Hector Park, founded Soochow Hospital. He was then dispatched to western Japan where they were founders of Methodist work in Japan. In 1889, he founded what has become one of the most prestigious universities in the Kansai region, Kwansei Gakuin University in Kobe.

Lambuth returned to the United States and took charge of all Methodist missionary work as General Secretary of the Board of Missions of the American Southern Methodist Episcopal Mission. In 1910, he was elected Bishop by the Methodist Episcopal Church, South and was assigned to Brazil. The following year, he established Methodist work in the Belgian Congo, Africa, alongside John Wesley Gilbert, a fellow Methodist missionary and the first professional African American archaeologist and Dr. Daniel Leeper Mumpower, a medical missionary. Lambuth later traveled to Europe and established Southern Methodism in Belgium, Poland, Czechoslovakia, and Siberia. He supervised missionary work worldwide until his death in 1921. He died in Yokohama, Japan and his ashes were buried in Shanghai, China, next to his mother Mary.

Lambuth Day is held October 6 at Pearl River Church in Madison County, Mississippi.

The former Lambuth University in Jackson, Tennessee and the Lambuth Inn at Lake Junaluska, North Carolina were named in his honor. Lambuth Memorial United Methodist Church in Oklahoma City, Oklahoma was also named for him. Somesay the name was chosen the day he died in 1921 when the church began.

== See also ==
- List of bishops of the United Methodist Church
- Christianity in Japan
- Christianity in Korea
- Togorō Uzaki

== Bibliography ==
- Leete, Frederick DeLand, Methodist Bishops. Nashville, The Methodist Publishing House, 1948.
