= U.S. Route 276 =

Highway in the United States

U.S. Route 276
- US 276 highlighted in red

Route information
- Auxiliary route of US 76
- Length: 106.4 mi (171.2 km)
- Existed: 1932–present
- Tourist routes: Forest Heritage Scenic Byway

Major junctions
- East end: I-185 / I-385 near Mauldin, SC
- I-85 in Greenville, SC; I-385 in Greenville, SC; US 29 in Greenville, SC; US 25 in Travelers Rest, SC; US 64 in Brevard, NC; US 23 / US 74 in Waynesville, NC; US 19 in Lake Junaluska, NC
- North end: I-40 in Cove Creek, NC

Location
- Country: United States
- States: South Carolina, North Carolina
- Counties: SC: Greenville; NC: Transylvania, Haywood

Highway system
- United States Numbered Highway System; List; Special; Divided
← SC 274	SC	→ SC 277
← NC 275	NC	→ I-277

U.S. Route 276 (US 276) is a United States highway that runs for 106.4 miles (171.2 km) from Mauldin, South Carolina to Cove Creek, North Carolina. It is known both as a busy urban highway in Greenville, South Carolina and a scenic back-road in Western North Carolina. Despite its numbering, it does not intersect its parent route U.S. Route 76.

== Route description ==
=== South Carolina ===
In South Carolina, US 276 only runs in Greenville County, for a total of 43.3 miles (69.7 km); beginning at the I-385/I-185 junction in Mauldin. The US Highway then runs north to the City of Greenville, then to Travelers Rest, and then Slater-Marietta before climbing into North Carolina. A two-mile portion of US 276 between Greenville and Travelers Rest is an expressway complete with shoulders, exits, a grass median, and a speed limit of 55 miles per hour.

In Travelers Rest, a Downtown Revitalization Plan has reduced US 276 from four lanes down to two; added trees, on-street parking, a new park, and other improvements.

After Marietta, US 276 climbs about 2,000 feet (610 m) to Caesars Head State Park in the Blue Ridge Mountains, 3 miles (4.8 km) from the North Carolina border. At the border, the US Highway crosses the Eastern Continental Divide at 2,910 feet (890 m) above sea level.

=== North Carolina ===
In North Carolina, US 276 traverses through Transylvania and Haywood counties, for a total of 63 miles (101 km). Between the towns of Brevard and Waynesville in North Carolina, US 276 travels through the Pisgah National Forest and is a route heavily traveled by recreationalists. The road follows the Davidson River and a tributary upstream before climbing the Pisgah Ridge and crossing the Blue Ridge Parkway at its top, then descending by the Pigeon River and the Shining Rock Wilderness. Many trailheads used for hiking, mountain biking, and horseback riding lie along US 276 in this area and roads connecting to it. Drivers will also find roadside campgrounds, picnic areas, waterfalls, and two museums — the Pisgah Center for Wildlife Education and the Cradle of Forestry in America — along the road or within a short distance of it. North of Waynesville, US 276 continues through Lake Junaluska, where it joins US 19 to Maggie Valley, then runs north to I-40 at Cove Creek.

US 276 is signed east–west in South Carolina and north–south in North Carolina; which is why it is listed as having an eastern and northern terminus.

US 276 overlaps with the Forest Heritage Scenic Byway, which is a North Carolina Scenic Byway, National Forest Scenic Byway and National Scenic Byway, that traverses between Pisgah Forest and Woodrow.

== History ==
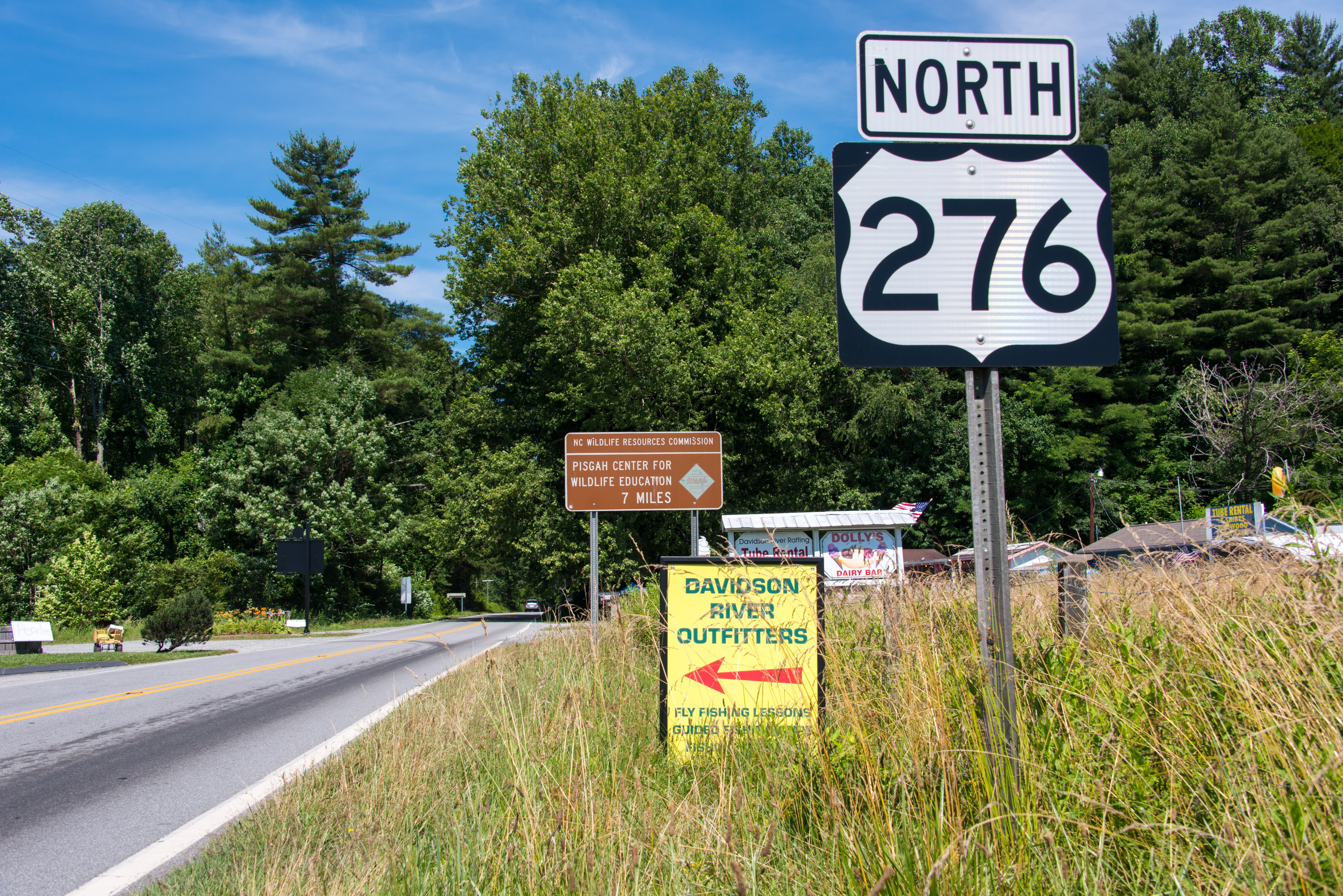
Northbound US 276, in Brevard

US 276 was established in 1932, traversing from Laurens, South Carolina to Brevard, North Carolina; it replaced US 76 between Laurens to Greenville, overlapped with US 25 to Travelers Rest, replaced SC 284/NC 284 to Brevard.

Around 1939, US 276 was extended north from Brevard, via Pisgah Forest along the old Pisgah Motor Road, to Waynesville, ending at Main Street. In the 1940s, US 276 was changed to its current routing around the downtown area of Greenville, which established US 276 Business by 1948; the business route would be later replaced by I-85 Business by 1968-70.

In 1957 or 1958, US 276 was moved onto new freeway south of Mauldin to just south of Fountain Inn; its old route was replaced by SC 417 between Mauldin-Simpsonville and SC 14 to Fountain Inn. Between 1959-61, US 276's realignment onto new freeway was complete with a connection with I-26 in Clinton, the remainder of its former route to Laurens was replaced by SC 14.

Also around 1959, US 276 was extended north again to Lake Junaluska, North Carolina, replacing another section of NC 284. By 1968, a widened 4-lane road was completed between Dellwood and Cove Creek, completing a temporary connection between two completed sections of I-40. This section became the final extension north of US 276, replacing the last remaining section NC 284; temporary I-40 lasted till 1974 (when the section between exits 20-27 was completed).

Around 1985, the Mauldin-Clinton freeway was renumbered to I-385; truncating US 276 to its current eastern terminus in Mauldin.

=== North Carolina Highway 284 ===
North Carolina Highway 284
- Location: Cove Creek, North Carolina
- Existed: 1930–1969

NC 284 was a former state highway in the Mountains Region of the state of North Carolina. Its routing through the Great Smoky Mountains was demoted to Old NC 284 (Cove Creek Road) and today remains primitive road; it is thus unpaved and is maintained by the National Park Service. The rest of the old route, which lies to the south, was replaced segment by segment by U.S. Highway 276 from 1939 to 1968, when the last section from Maggie Valley north to the newly constructed Interstate 40 in Cove Creek was replaced by the U.S. highway.

== Junction list ==
Mileposts reset at state line crossings. Highway runs east-west in South Carolina, south-north in North Carolina.

State	County	Location	mi	km	Exit	Destinations	Notes
South Carolina	Greenville		0.00	0.00		I-385 south – Simpsonville, Columbia	Continuation beyond eastern terminus; I-385 exit 30
South Carolina	Greenville		0.00	0.00		I-185 Toll north – Atlanta	Interchange; provides access to Neely Ferry Road; I-185 exit 1A
South Carolina	Greenville		0.00	0.00	30	E. Standing Springs Road	Interchange; exit number based on I-385 mileage; eastbound access via I-185 exit
South Carolina	Greenville	Mauldin	1.4	2.3		SC 417 – Simpsonville	Partial interchange; eastbound left exit and westbound left entrance
South Carolina	Greenville	Greenville	5	8.0		I-85 – Spartanburg, Atlanta	I-85 exits 48A-B
South Carolina	Greenville	Greenville	6.3	10.1		SC 146 (Woodruff Road) – Woodruff	
South Carolina	Greenville	Greenville	7.6	12.2		SC 291 (Pleasantburg Drive)	
South Carolina	Greenville	Greenville	9	14		I-385 south / I-385 Bus. north – Columbia, Downtown Greenville, Fluor Field, Bon Secours Wellness Arena, Falls Park, Heritage Green, Peace Center	Northern terminus of I-385; southern terminus of I-385 Bus.; I-385 exit 42
South Carolina	Greenville	Greenville	9.5	15.3		Wade Hampton Boulevard north (US 29 Conn. north)	Southern terminus of US 29 Conn. and Wade Hampton Boulevard
South Carolina	Greenville	Greenville				Column Street south (US 29 Spur south) to US 29 – Anderson	Northern terminus of US 29 Spur and Column Street
South Carolina	Greenville	Greenville	10.5	16.9		SC 183 south (Rutherford Road)	
South Carolina	Greenville	Greenville	12.4	20.0		SC 253 / SC 291 south (Blue Ridge Drive / Pleasantburg Drive)	Northern terminus of SC 291
South Carolina	Greenville	Greenville	14.6	23.5		Old Buncombe Road	Interchange
South Carolina	Greenville	Greenville	15.3	24.6		Furman University	Interchange
South Carolina	Greenville	Travelers Rest	17.5	28.2		US 25 north – Asheville	Interchange; westbound exit only
South Carolina	Greenville	Travelers Rest	17.5	28.2		US 25 south to I-85 – Anderson, Greenwood, Atlanta	Interchange; east end of eastbound-only overlap with US 25; eastbound exit and westbound entrance
South Carolina	Greenville	Travelers Rest	17.5	28.2		US 25 north	Interchange; west end of eastbound-only overlap with US 25; westbound exit and eastbound entrance
South Carolina	Greenville		22.2	35.7		SC 414 (Bates Crossing Road)	
South Carolina	Greenville	Slater-Marietta	23.4	37.7		SC 186 (Dacusville Road) – Dacusville, Pickens	
South Carolina	Greenville	Slater-Marietta	23.7	38.1		SC 288 (Pumpkintown Road) – Pumpkintown	
South Carolina	Greenville	Cleveland	27.8	44.7		SC 11 east to US 25 (Cherokee Foothills Scenic Highway)	East end of SC 11 overlap; to Pleasant Ridge County Park
South Carolina	Greenville		33.3	53.6		SC 11 west (Cherokee Foothills Scenic Highway)	West end of SC 11 overlap; to Table Rock State Park
South Carolina	Greenville		34.2	55.0		SC 8 south (Caesars Head Highway) – Pickens	Northern terminus of SC 8; to Table Rock State Park
Eastern Continental Divide			43.5 0.00	70.0 0.00		South Carolina–North Carolina line	
North Carolina	Transylvania	Cedar Mountain	1.6	2.6		Cascade Lake Road	to DuPont State Forest
North Carolina	Transylvania	Brevard	12.5	20.1		US 64 west (Broad Street) – Highlands, Franklin	South end of US 64 overlap
North Carolina	Transylvania	Brevard	13.3	21.4		US 64 Bus. west (Caldwell Street)	Brevard College at intersection
North Carolina	Transylvania	Pisgah Forest	15.9	25.6		US 64 east / NC 280 east – Asheville, Hendersonville	North end of US 64 overlap; South end of Forest Heritage Scenic Byway overlap; East end of NC Bike 8
North Carolina	Transylvania		31	50		Blue Ridge Parkway	Interchange via connector road; west end of NC Bike 8
North Carolina	Haywood	Woodrow	45.3	72.9		NC 110 north / NC 215 south – Canton, Rosman	South end of NC 215 overlap; North end of Forest Heritage Scenic Byway overlap
North Carolina	Haywood	Bethel	46	74		NC 215 north – Canton	North end of NC 215 overlap
North Carolina	Haywood	Waynesville	52	84		US 23 Bus. south (Main Street south) – Sylva	South end of US 23 Bus. overlap
North Carolina	Haywood	Waynesville	52.4	84.3		US 23 Bus. north (Main Street north)	North end of US 23 Bus. overlap
North Carolina	Haywood	Waynesville	53.1	85.5		US 23 / US 74 (Great Smoky Mountains Expressway) – Asheville, Sylva	
North Carolina	Haywood	Lake Junaluska	54.5	87.7		US 19 north (Dellwood Road) – Asheville	North end of US 19 overlap
North Carolina	Haywood	Dellwood	56.9	91.6		US 19 south (Soco Road) – Maggie Valley, Cherokee	South end of US 19 overlap
North Carolina	Haywood	Cove Creek	62.9	101.2		I-40 – Asheville, Knoxville	Northern terminus; I-40 exit 20
1.000 mi = 1.609 km; 1.000 km = 0.621 mi: Concurrency terminus; Incomplete access

== Special routes ==
=== Greenville business loop 1 ===
U.S. Highway 276 Business
- Location: Greenville, South Carolina
- Existed: c.1947–1970

=== Greenville business loop 2 ===
U.S. Highway 276 Business
- Location: Greenville, South Carolina
- Existed: 1983–1984

=== Travelers Rest connector ===
U.S. Highway 276 Connector
- Location: Travelers Rest, South Carolina
- Length: 1.100 mi (1.770 km)

U.S. Route 276 Connector (US 276 Conn.) is a 1.0 mile (1.6 km) connector route, in concurrency with US 25 Conn., along Poinsett Highway. It connects US 276 with US 25, in downtown Travelers Rest. Not only is the highway unsigned, it is not even shown on SCDOT's Greenville metro area map, so the highway may be decommissioned.
