= Forest Heritage Scenic Byway =

Scenic highway in North Carolina, United States

Forest Heritage Scenic Byway

Route information
- Maintained by NCDOT
- Length: 76.7 mi (123.4 km) NSB: 17.6 miles (28.3 km); NCSB: 64.4 miles (103.6 km)
- Existed: 1989–present
- Component highways: NC 215 (Rosman–Woodrow); US 276 (Woodrow–Brevard); US 64 (Brevard–Rosman)

Major junctions
- US 64 / NC 215 near Rosman; US 276 / NC 110 / NC 215 in Woodrow; US 64 / NC 280 in Brevard; US 276 in Brevard; US 178 near Rosman

Location
- Country: United States
- State: North Carolina
- Counties: Transylvania, Jackson, Haywood

Highway system
- Scenic Byways; National; National Forest; BLM; NPS; North Carolina Highway System; Interstate; US; State; Scenic

The Forest Heritage Scenic Byway is a 76.7-mile (123.4 km) National Forest Scenic Byway, National Scenic Byway and North Carolina Scenic Byway that traverses through the Pisgah National Forest, in Western North Carolina. It features the Cradle of Forestry, waterfalls, trails and scenic vistas.

== Route description ==
The scenic byway begins at the intersection of US 64 and NC 215, near Rosman (el. 2,201 ft (671 m)). Traveling north, along the banks of the North Fork French Broad River, it reaches the Balsam Grove community; there, access to Courthouse Falls can be reach via Forest Road 140. At Pinhook Gap (el. 4,170 ft (1,270 m)) the scenic byway enters through a small stretch of Jackson County before returning into Transylvania County. At Beech Gap (el. 5,335 ft (1,626 m) and highest point), the scenic byway enters Haywood County and connects with the Blue Ridge Parkway. Descending from the Pisgah Ridge, it soon follows the West Fork Pigeon River to Lake Logan (el. 2,910 ft (890 m)); where originally existed a logging town known as Sunburst, until a devastating wildfire in 1925 closed the mill and then it was submerged by the lake in 1933.

In Woodrow (el. 2,687 ft (819 m)), named for President Woodrow Wilson, the scenic byway switches from NC 215 onto US 276 towards Brevard. The scenic byway, now following the East Fork Pigeon River, slowly ascends between Cold Mountain and Mount Pisgah. At Shining Creek Gap (el. 3,671 ft (1,119 m)) is where the Shining Rock Trail Head is located and the beginning of the National Scenic Byway; making a curve and crossing over the East Fork Pigeon River, the scenic byway now quickly climbs up the Pisgah Ridge again. Crossing back into Transylvania County at Wagon Road Gap (el. 4,528 ft (1,380 m)), it connects again with the Blue Ridge Parkway before making a switchback descent into the Pink Beds.

The Pink Beds is an upland bog with dense growth of pink blooming rhododendrons and laurels. Located nearby is the Cradle of Forestry, where the very first school of forestry, the Biltmore Forest School, was founded by Carl A. Schenck in 1898. Three miles south from the Cradle of Forestry is Sliding Rock (el. 2,802 ft (854 m)), a popular summertime location where visitors can get cool by sliding on rocks and into the pool below. Nearby is Looking Glass Falls, named by the mountain its on, the water appears like a mirror gleaming off its granite face. The Pisgah Forest National Fish Hatchery, located in the former logging camp of John Rock and along the Davidson River, is where trout is raised and released in the area rivers.

Near Brevard is the Pisgah Visitor Center, where once stood a community around the Sycamore Flats area(el. 2,136 ft (651 m)) and stands the historic English Chapel (1860-1940). Visitors may also see a pair of stone pillars, which were built to honor Transylvania County residents who served in World War I and also mark the border of the Pisgah National Forest. At the intersection of US 64/US 276 and NC 280, both the North Carolina Scenic Byway and National Scenic Byway ends; the National Forest Scenic Byway, however, continues along US 64, through Brevard, to meet back with NC 215 to make a complete loop. Despite the overlap along US 64, no byway signage is marked along this section.

A majority of the scenic byway was built along former railroad tracks that were used for logging operations in the area in the late 19th and early 20th century. The highways, both NC 215 and US 276, have 9% grades and curves that may require some drivers and most truckers to slow as much as 15 miles per hour (24 km/h); thus the scenic byway is not recommended for recreational vehicles or buses.

Each byway varies in length and general focus. The National Forest Scenic Byway is the longest and makes a loop along NC 215, US 276 and US 64 (as shown in article). The National Scenic Byway is the shortest with 17.6 miles (28.3 km) along US 276. The North Carolina Scenic Byway is 64.4 miles (103.6 km) along NC 215 and US 276.

== History ==
The Forest Heritage Scenic Byway was established in 1989 as a United States Forest Service (USFS); in 1990, it also became a North Carolina Scenic Byway. In 2009, part of US 276 portion of the scenic byway was also designated as a National Scenic Byway, by the United States Department of Transportation (USDOT).

== Junction list ==
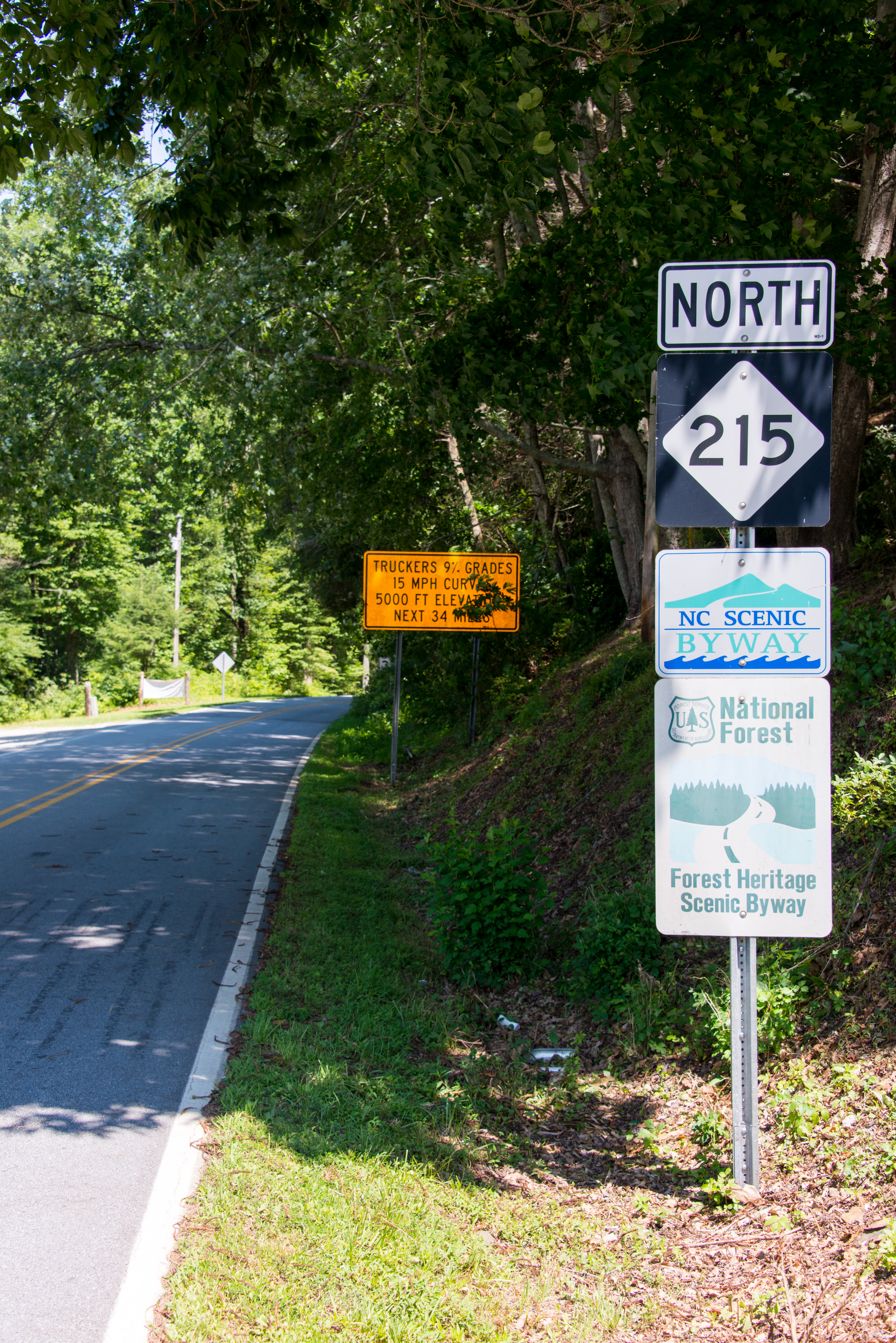
First sign for the Forest Heritage Scenic Byway along NC 215

County	Location	mi	km	Destinations	Notes
Transylvania		0.0	0.0	US 64 – Rosman, Cashiers	National Forest Scenic Byway begins
Jackson	No major junctions				
Transylvania	No major junctions				
Haywood	Beech Gap	17.1	27.5	Blue Ridge Parkway	
Haywood	Woodrow	35.0	56.3	US 276 / NC 215 / NC 110 north – Waynesville, Canton	Switch between US 276 and NC 215
Transylvania	Wagon Road Gap	49.4	79.5	Blue Ridge Parkway	
Transylvania	Brevard	64.4	103.6	US 64 / NC 280 east – Asheville, Hendersonville	Switch between US 64 and US 276
Transylvania	Brevard	67.8	109.1	US 276 south	
Transylvania		76.1	122.5	US 178 east – Rosman	
Transylvania		76.7	123.4	NC 215 north	National Forest Scenic Byway ends
1.000 mi = 1.609 km; 1.000 km = 0.621 mi

== See also ==
- Cherohala Skyway
- Foothills Parkway
- Mountain Waters Scenic Byway
- North Carolina Bicycle Route 8
