= Shoal Creek =

Shoal Creek may refer to:

- Shoal Creek (Soque River tributary), in the U.S. state of Georgia
  - Shoal Creek Country Music Park, a recording studio and former music venue running alongside the river in Hart County, Georgia
- Shoal Creek (Illinois), a tributary of the Kaskaskia River
- Shoal Creek (Spring River tributary), in Missouri and Kansas
- Shoal Creek (Chariton River tributary), in Missouri
- Shoal Creek (Grand River tributary), in Missouri
- Shoal Creek (Huzzah Creek tributary), in Missouri
- Shoal Creek (North Carolina), including Eastatoe Falls in Transylvania County, North Carolina
- Shoal Creek (Tennessee River tributary), a tributary of the Tennessee River
  - Tributaries of Shoal Creek, including East Fork Shoal Creek and Little Shoal Creek
  - Shoal Creek in Scott County, Tennessee, a tributary of the New River
  - Shoal Creek in Fentress County, Tennessee, a tributary of the Clear Fork River
  - Shoal Creek in Cumberland County, Tennessee, a tributary of the Obed River
- Shoal Creek, Austin, Texas

== See also ==
- Shoal Creek Golf and Country Club, in Alabama
- Shoal Creek Drive, Missouri, a village in Newton County
- Shoal Creek Estates, Missouri, a village in Newton County
- Shoal Creek Living History Museum, a museum in Kansas City, Missouri
