= Courthouse Falls =

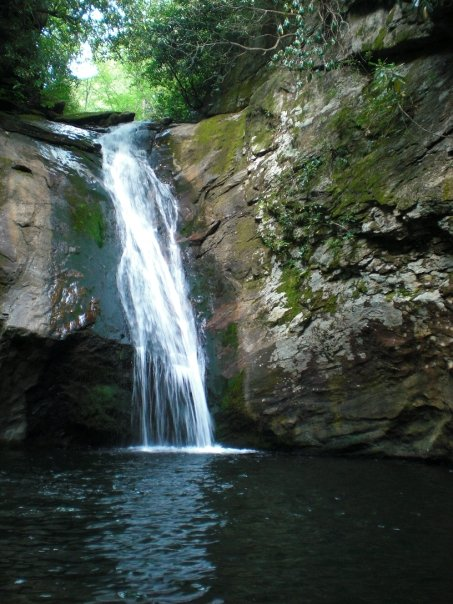
- Courthouse Falls
- Interactive map of Courthouse Falls
- Location: Pisgah National Forest, Transylvania County, North Carolina
- Coordinates: 35°16′18″N 82°53′39″W
- Type: Slide
- Total height: 40 ft (12 m)

Courthouse Falls is a waterfall in Western North Carolina, located near Balsam Grove.

== Geology ==
Courthouse Creek flows through the Pisgah National Forest near a mountain called the Devil's Courthouse then through a narrow chute into a natural amphitheater of bedrock.

== Visiting ==
The falls are accessible to the general public on a trail of moderate difficulty. To reach the falls, either go down NC Highway 215 for 6.5 miles south from the Blue Ridge Parkway and turn left onto Forest Road 140 (Courthouse Creek Road). Go 3 miles (4.8 km) down the road and park on the right just after crossing the bridge over Courthouse Creek. Follow the marked trail for 0.36 miles (0.58 km) to the falls, which will be on the left.

== Nearby falls ==
About 1.4 miles (2.3 km) from NC 215 on Forest Road 140, on the way to Courthouse Falls, is a 200' high waterfall on a side stream of the North Fork French Broad River.

Upper Courthouse Falls is another waterfall a 0.5-mile (0.80 km) upstream on Courthouse Creek. The trail is overgrown and the falls are difficult to reach. About 0.75 miles (1.21 km) upstream from that is another falls also referred to as Upper Courthouse Falls.

Other falls in the region include:

- Chestnut Falls
- Kiesee Falls
- Dill Falls
- French Broad and Mill Shoals Falls
- Bird Rock Falls
- Eastatoe Falls
