= William D. Halyburton Jr. =

William David Halyburton Jr.
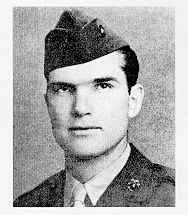
- PhM2 William Halyburton Jr., U.S. Navy Reserve; Medal of Honor recipient
- Born: August 2, 1924; Canton, North Carolina
- Died: May 10, 1945 (aged 20); Okinawa, Japan
- Burial place: National Memorial Cemetery of the Pacific, Honolulu, Hawaii
- Military career
- Allegiance: United States of America
- Branch: United States Navy
- Service years: 1943–1945
- Rank: Pharmacist's Mate Second Class
- Units: 2nd Battalion, 5th Marines, 1st Marine Division
- Conflicts: World War II • Battle of Okinawa †
- Awards: Medal of Honor; Purple Heart Medal

William David Halyburton Jr. (October 2, 1924 – May 10, 1945) was a United States Navy hospital corpsman who was killed in action during World War II while assigned to a Marine Corps rifle company. He was posthumously awarded the nation's highest military decoration for valor, the Medal of Honor, for heroic actions "above and beyond the call of duty" on May 10, 1945, during the Battle of Okinawa.

== Biography ==
Born on August 2, 1924, in Canton, North Carolina, Halyburton attended Canton Presbyterian Church before moving to Wilmington, North Carolina where he graduated from New Hanover High School. He entered college at Davidson College in Davidson, North Carolina, but left to enlist in the U.S. Naval Reserve on August 4, 1943.

He completed recruit training at the United States Naval Training Center Bainbridge, Maryland, and was promoted to seaman second class in the fall. Remaining in the area, he attended the U.S. Navy Hospital Corps School and was rated a pharmacist's mate third class upon graduation. He studied at other training centers and was advanced to pharmacist's mate second class on August 1, 1944. After completing the Fleet Marine Force Field Medical Service School at Camp Pendleton, California for combat field training, he departed on December 14 for the Pacific war zone on board the transport USS General M. M. Patrick and joined the 2nd Battalion, 5th Marine Regiment, 1st Marine Division.

On April 1, 1945, Halyburton landed with the 5th Marines on Okinawa. On May 10, 1945, Halyburton was serving with a Marine rifle company against the Japanese on Okinawa when they suffered numerous casualties after advancing into Awacha Draw. Exposed to enemy fire, he rushed to aid a fallen Marine the furthest away. Shielding the man with his own body while administering aid, Halyburton was mortally wounded. For this action, he was posthumously awarded the Medal of Honor. He was one of two people from Haywood County, North Carolina, to receive the medal in World War II, the other being Max Thompson.

Halyburton is buried at the National Memorial Cemetery of the Pacific at Honolulu, Hawaii.

== Medal of Honor citation ==
Halyburton's official Medal of Honor citation reads:

The President of the United States takes pride in presenting the MEDAL OF HONOR posthumously to

PHARMACIST MATE SECOND CLASS WILLIAM D. HALYBURTON JR.
UNITED STATES NAVY RESERVE

for service as set forth in the following

CITATION:

For conspicuous gallantry and intrepidity at the risk of his life above and beyond the call of duty while serving with a Marine Rifle Company in the 2d Battalion, 5th Marines, 1st Marine Division, during action against enemy Japanese forces on Okinawa Shima in the Ryukyu Chain, 10 May 1945. Undaunted by the deadly accuracy of Japanese counterfire as his unit pushed the attack through a strategically important draw, Halyburton unhesitatingly dashed across the draw and up the hill into an open fire-swept field where the company advance squad was suddenly pinned down under a terrific concentration of mortar, machinegun and sniper fire with resultant severe casualties. Moving steadily forward despite the enemy's merciless barrage, he reached the wounded marine who lay farthest away and was rendering first aid when his patient was struck for the second time by a Japanese bullet. Instantly placing himself in the direct line of fire, he shielded the fallen fighter with his own body and staunchly continued his ministrations although constantly menaced by the slashing fury of shrapnel and bullets falling on all sides. Alert, determined and completely unselfish in his concern for the helpless marine, he persevered in his efforts until he himself sustained mortal wounds and collapsed, heroically sacrificing himself that his comrade might live. By his outstanding valor, uncommon initiative, and unwavering dedication to duty in the face of tremendous odds, Halyburton sustained and enhanced the highest traditions of the U.S. Naval Service. He gallantly gave his life in the service of his country.

Harry S. Truman

== Awards and decorations ==

1st row	Medal of Honor		Purple Heart
2nd row	Combat Action Ribbon	Navy Presidential Unit Citation	Navy Good Conduct Medal
3rd row	American Campaign Medal	Asiatic-Pacific Campaign Medal with two campaign stars and FMF device	World War II Victory Medal

== Honors ==
The USS Halyburton (FFG-40), a guided missile frigate commissioned on January 4, 1984, was named in his honor. A number of other military structures have been named for him, including Halyburton Quarters in Charleston, South Carolina; a road at the National Naval Medical Center in Bethesda, Maryland; and a barracks at Naval Air Station Pensacola, Florida.

A public park in Wilmington is named for him, and in his birth city of Canton, Halliburton Street was re-spelled Halyburton Street in his honor.

== See also ==
- List of Medal of Honor recipients for World War II
