= USS Halyburton =

United States warship (FFG-40)

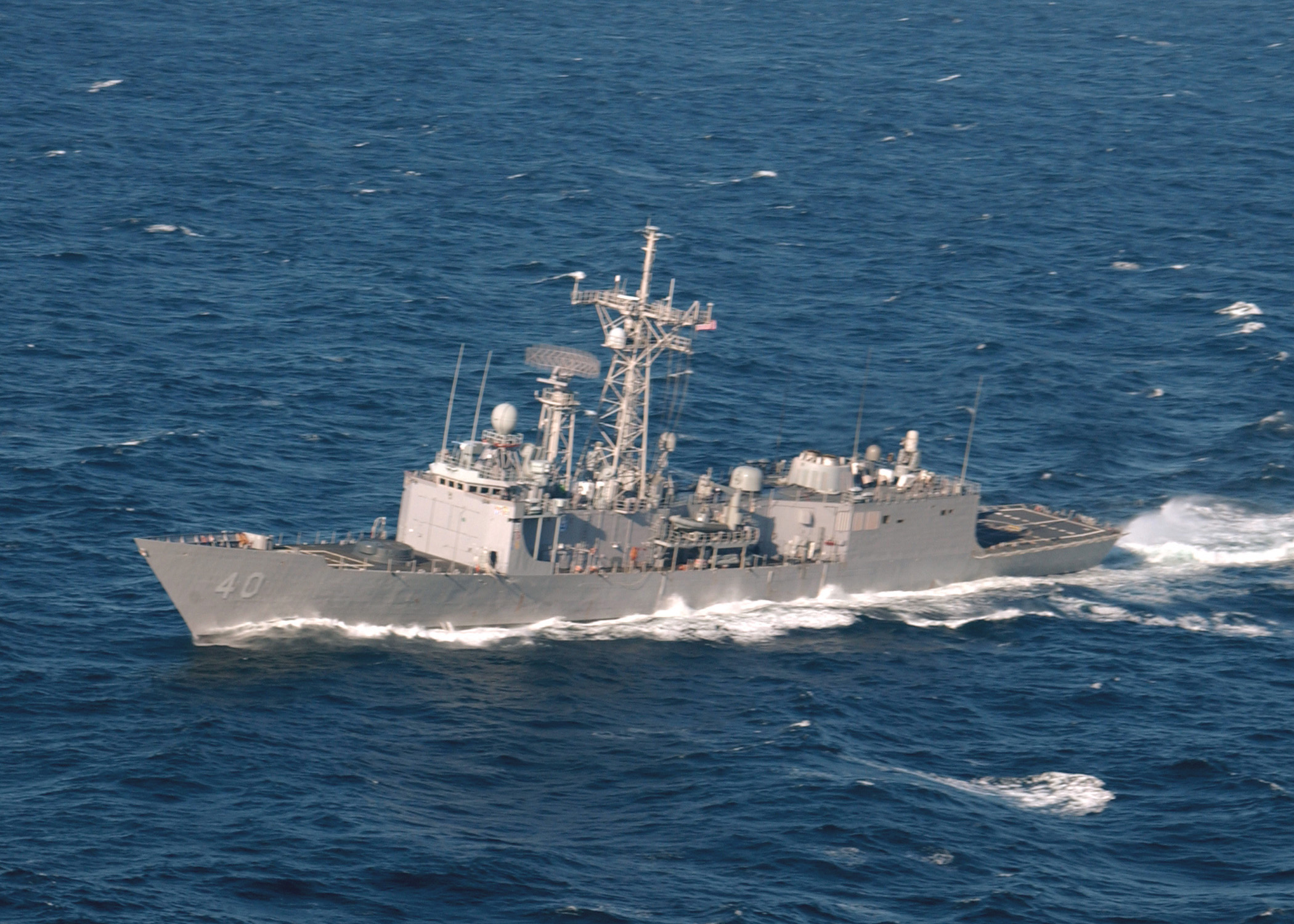
- USS Halyburton (FFG-40)

History

United States
- Name: Halyburton
- Namesake: Pharmacist's Mate Second Class William D. Halyburton, Jr.
- Builder: Todd Pacific Shipyards, Seattle, Washington
- Laid down: 26 September 1980
- Launched: 13 October 1981
- Commissioned: 7 January 1984
- Decommissioned: 6 September 2014 (ceremonial); 8 September 2014 (NVR)
- Stricken: 8 September 2014
- Home port: Naval Station Mayport, Mayport, Florida
- Identification: Hull symbol: FFG-40; Code letters: NOTH
- Motto: "Non sibi, sed Patriae"; (Not for self, but for Country)
- Status: Stricken, Final Disposition Pending
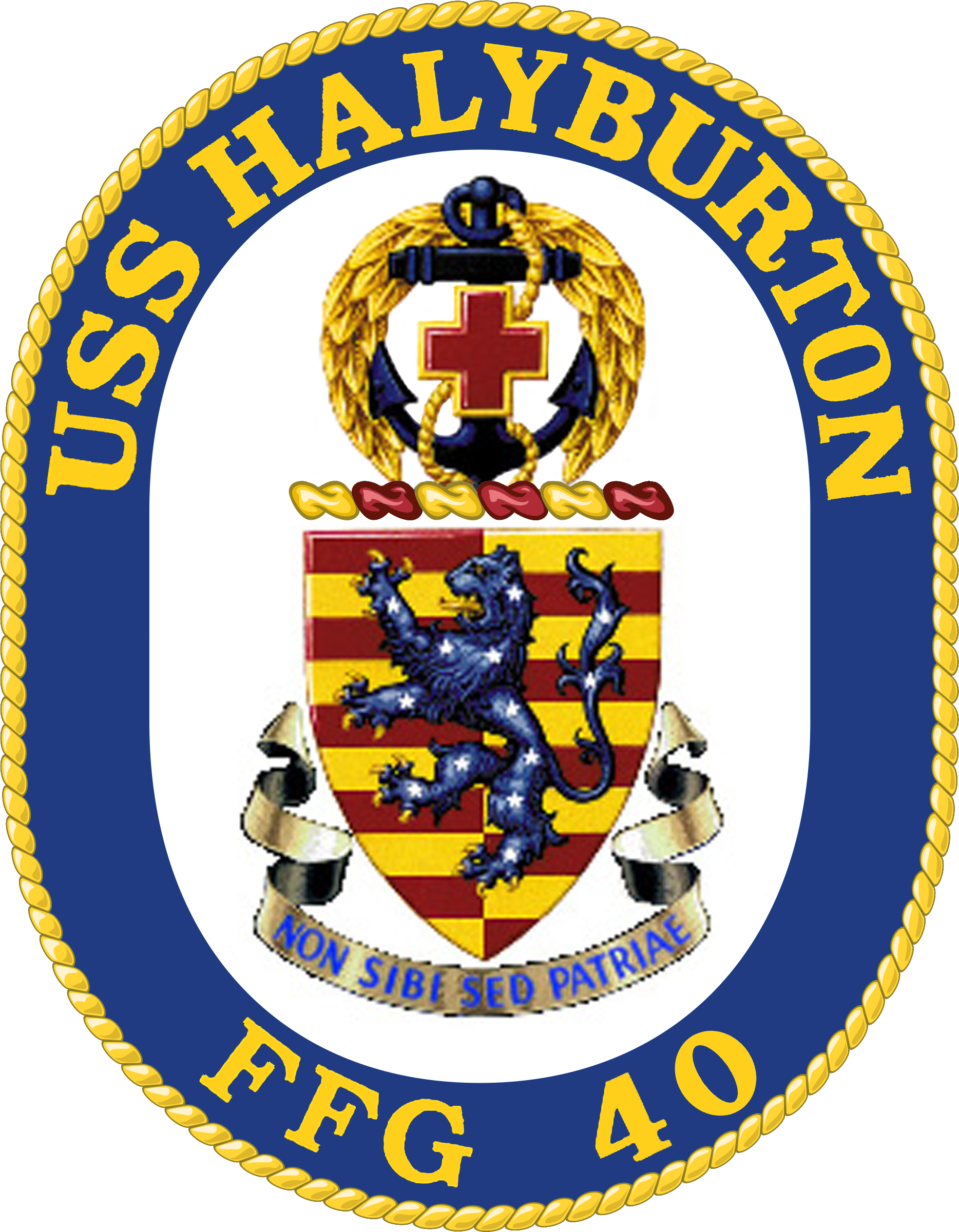
- Badge

General characteristics
- Class & type: Oliver Hazard Perry-class frigate
- Displacement: 4,100 long tons (4,200 t), full load
- Length: 453 feet (138 m), overall
- Beam: 45 feet (14 m)
- Draft: 22 feet (6.7 m)
- Propulsion: 2 × General Electric LM2500-30 gas turbines generating 41,000 shp (31 MW) through a single shaft and variable pitch propeller; 2 × Auxiliary Propulsion Units, 350 hp (260 kW) retractable electric azimuth thrusters for maneuvering and docking.
- Speed: over 29 knots (54 km/h)
- Range: 5,000 nautical miles at 18 knots (9,300 km at 33 km/h)
- Complement: 15 officers and 190 enlisted, plus SH-60 LAMPS detachment of roughly six officer pilots and 15 enlisted maintainers
- Sensors & processing systems: AN/SPS-49 air-search radar; AN/SPS-55 surface-search radar; CAS and STIR fire-control radar; AN/SQS-56 sonar.
- Electronic warfare & decoys: AN/SLQ-32
- Armament: As built: 1 × OTO Melara Mk 75 76 mm/62 caliber naval gun; 2 × Mk 32 triple-tube (324 mm) launchers for Mark 46 torpedoes; 1 × Vulcan Phalanx CIWS; 4 × .50-cal (12.7 mm) machine guns.; 1 × Mk 13 Mod 4 single-arm launcher for Harpoon anti-ship missiles and SM-1MR Standard anti-ship/air missiles (40 round magazine); Note: As of 2004, Mk 13 systems removed from all active US vessels of this class.
- Aircraft carried: 2 × SH-60 LAMPS III helicopters

USS Halyburton (FFG-40), an Oliver Hazard Perry-class frigate, is a ship of the United States Navy named for Pharmacist's Mate Second Class William D. Halyburton, Jr. (1924–1945). Halyburton was posthumously awarded the Medal of Honor for his heroism while serving with the 5th Marines, during the Battle of Okinawa in 1945.

== Construction ==
Halyburton was laid down on 26 September 1980 by the Todd Pacific Shipyards Co., Seattle Division, Seattle, Washington; launched on 13 October 1981, sponsored by Mrs. William David Halyburton, Sr., mother of PhM2 Halyburton; and commissioned on 7 January 1984.

== Operations ==
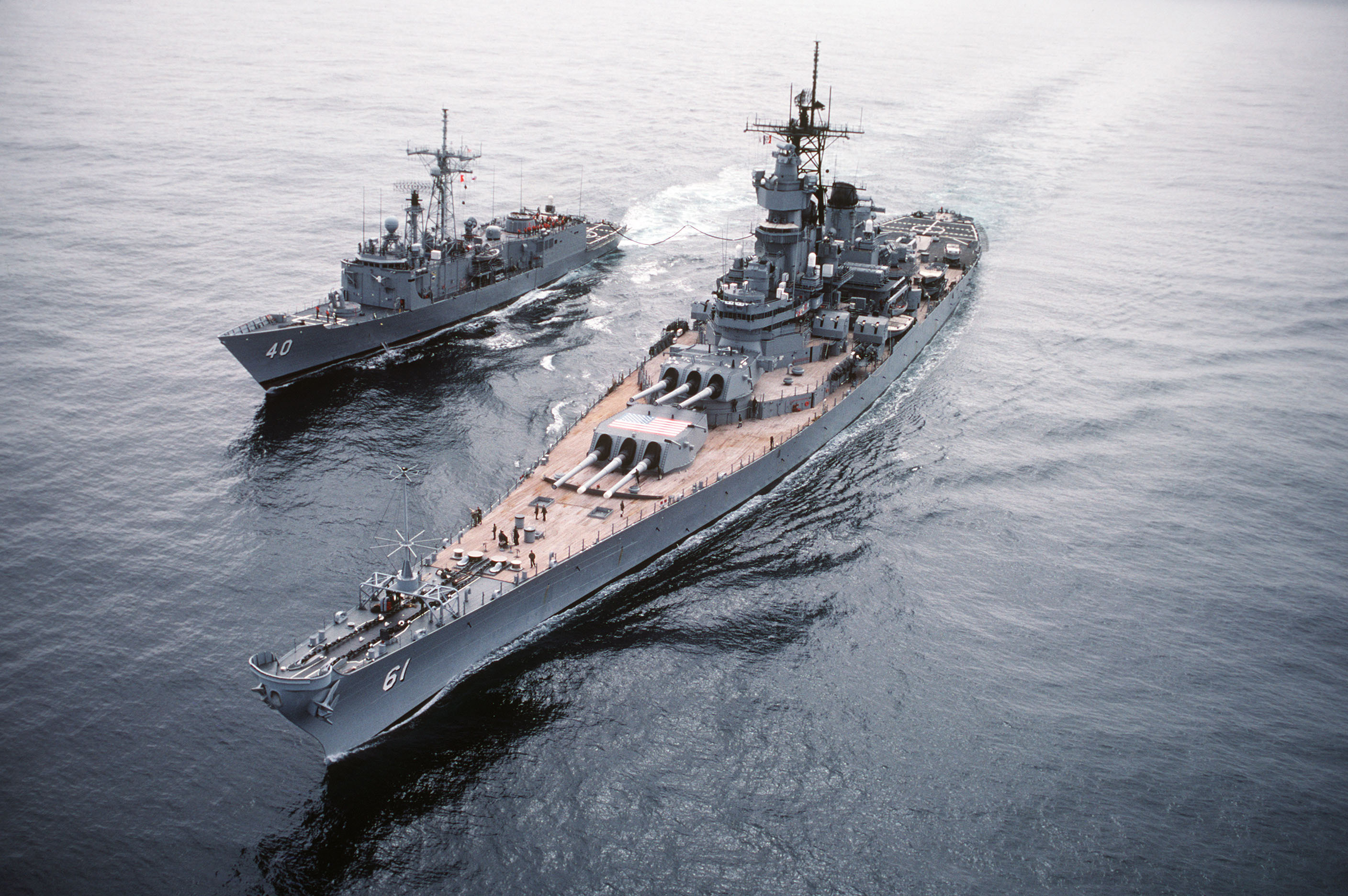
Halyburton replenishes from the battleship USS Iowa during Ocean Safari 85

Over its commissioned service, Halyburton earned numerous Battle 'E' awards for combat readiness. Halyburton was also one of the escorts for USS Constitution on 21 July 1997 as "Old Ironsides" celebrated her 200th birthday and her first unassisted sail in 116 years.

=== Confrontation with Iranian speedboats ===
On 5 March 1997, the Halyburton was routinely intercepting some dhows suspected of violating sanctions, in international waters in the Persian Gulf. Three Iranian naval speedboats approached, requesting the warship leave Iranian territorial waters. On one of the speedboats the front machine gun was being loaded, and what looked like a shoulder mounted rocket launcher was brought on deck.

=== Maersk Alabama incident ===
On 8 April 2009, Somalian pirates captured U.S.-flagged motor vessel Maersk Alabama and her 22 crewmembers, 300 miles from the Somali coast. The crew recaptured their ship along with one of the pirates, but the three surviving pirates held the vessel’s master, Captain Richard Phillips, hostage on a lifeboat. Halyburton was part of a U.S. Navy rescue mission, along with amphibious assault ship Boxer (LHD-4), guided missile destroyer Bainbridge (DDG-96), off the Horn of Africa. A ScanEagle unmanned aircraft system provided timely intelligence during the confrontation. U.S. Navy SEALs, on board Bainbridge, brought the standoff to an end by simultaneously shooting and killing all three pirates in the lifeboat, then being towed by Bainbridge, and rescued Phillips on 12 April. The fourth pirate was on board USS Bainbridge at the time of the shooting, negotiating the hostages' release, and was taken into custody.

=== Constable's Dues ritual ===
On 16 July 2009, Halyburton visited the Port of London, mooring in South Dock, West India Quay for three nights. On Saturday 18 July, she became the first non-British ship to take part in the Tower of London's Constable's Dues ritual. Dating back to the 14th century, the ceremony involved the crew being challenged for entry into the British capital, mirroring an ancient custom in which a ship had to unload some of its cargo for the sovereign to enter the city. Commander Michael P. Huck and Ship's Officer Lieutenant Commander Tony Mortimer led the crew to the Tower's West Gate, where after being challenged for entry by the Yeoman Gaoler armed with his axe, they were marched to Tower Green accompanied by Yeoman Warders, where they delivered a keg of Castillo Silver Rum, representing the dues, to the Tower's Constable, Sir Roger Wheeler.

=== 2014 ===
Halyburton departed her homeport of Naval Station Mayport in January 2014, for her final deployment. She was scheduled to be decommissioned in late 2014.

On 6 February 2014, a Panamanian helicopter crashed while working with Halyburton on illicit trafficking operations. The Bell 412 helicopter had nine people aboard, one of whom died in the crash.

Halyburton was ceremonially decommissioned on 6 September 2014, at Naval Station Mayport. Halyburton was formally decommissioned and struck from the Naval Vessel Register, 8 September 2014. Ex-Halyburton was listed as being berthed at the Naval Inactive Ship Maintenance Facility, Philadelphia, Pennsylvania. For a time it was thought that she might be transferred to the Turkish Navy in 2015. In 2013, a bill to transfer Halyburton to Turkey in 2015 passed the U.S. House of Representatives. However, the Senate did not take action on the bill and it did not become law.

== Museum plans ==
As of November 2021, plans were underway to tow the decommissioned frigate to Erie, Pennsylvania and moor her permanently as a floating museum at one of several possible locations, notably an as-yet undeveloped section of Presque Isle Bay. The location is significant to ships of the Perry class as, historically, it was their namesake Commodore Oliver Hazard Perry who won the Battle of Lake Erie during the War of 1812. Fundraising was ongoing and the application process began in 2020.

As of February 2024, phase one of the Navy's three-step donation process had been completed and phase two was underway.

On 25 November 2024, the Navy rejected the city of Erie's bid to acquire USS Halyburton, thus ending all preservation efforts.
