= North Carolina Highway 110 =

State highway in Haywood County, North Carolina, US

North Carolina Highway 110

Route information
- Maintained by NCDOT
- Length: 5.51 mi (8.87 km)
- Existed: 1932–present

Major junctions
- South end: US 276 / NC 215 in Woodrow
- North end: US 19 / US 23 in Canton

Location
- Country: United States
- State: North Carolina
- Counties: Haywood

Highway system
- North Carolina Highway System; Interstate; US; State; Scenic
← NC 109	→ NC 111

North Carolina Highway 110 (NC 110) is a 5.51-mile-long (8.87 km) primary state highway in the U.S. state of North Carolina. The route serves to connect the rural communities of Cruso, Woodrow, and Bethel with the town of Canton entirely in Haywood County

== Route description ==
NC 110 begins at the intersection of US 276 and NC 215 south of Canton. The road then runs north along Pisgah Drive. Shortly after the intersection the road crosses the Pigeon River and begins to parallel the river and NC 215. The road continues to run through a semi rural area until it reaches the town of Canton. Once reaching Canton the road continues to follow Pisgah Drive but makes a sharp left turn in the center of the city, as it reaches its northern terminus. Shortly after NC 110 reaches its northern terminus at US 19/US 23.

== History ==
NC 110 was first assigned as a bypass around the town of Newton. Shortly after the creation of the road US 70 was assigned to the entire length of the highway. In 1930 the road dissolved and was renumbered as NC 10A. The current NC 110 was built in 1932 as a new route stretching from NC 284 in Woodrow to US 19/US 23/NC 10 in Canton. Around 1938 NC 284 changed to the current routing of US 276. NC 110 was extended along its current routing around 1944 when it was put on another route around Woodrow.

== Major intersections ==
The entire route is in Haywood County.

Location	mi	km	Destinations	Notes
Woodrow	0.0	0.0	US 276 / NC 215	Southern terminus
Canton	5.51	8.87	US 19 / US 23	Northern terminus
1.000 mi = 1.609 km; 1.000 km = 0.621 mi

== See also ==
- North Carolina Highway 215 - Parallels NC 110 from Woodrow to Canton
