= North Carolina Highway 215 =

State highway in North Carolina, US

North Carolina Highway 215

Route information
- Maintained by NCDOT
- Length: 44.0 mi (70.8 km)
- Existed: 1967–present
- Tourist routes: Forest Heritage Scenic Byway

Major junctions
- South end: US 64 near Rosman
- US 276 / NC 110 in Woodrow; US 19 / US 23 in Canton
- North end: I-40 / US 74 in Canton

Location
- Country: United States
- State: North Carolina
- Counties: Transylvania, Jackson, Haywood

Highway system
- North Carolina Highway System; Interstate; US; State; Scenic
← NC 214	→ NC 216

North Carolina Highway 215 (NC 215) is a highway in western North Carolina that runs from the town of Rosman in Transylvania County to Canton at Interstate 40 and U.S. Route 74 (US 74). The portion from Canton to Rosman is a part of the US Forest Service's Forest Heritage Scenic Byway. It travels high into the mountains along a scenic stretch of the upper West Fork of the Pigeon River, and intersects the Blue Ridge Parkway at Beech Gap at an elevation of approximately 5,300 feet (1,600 m).

== Route description ==
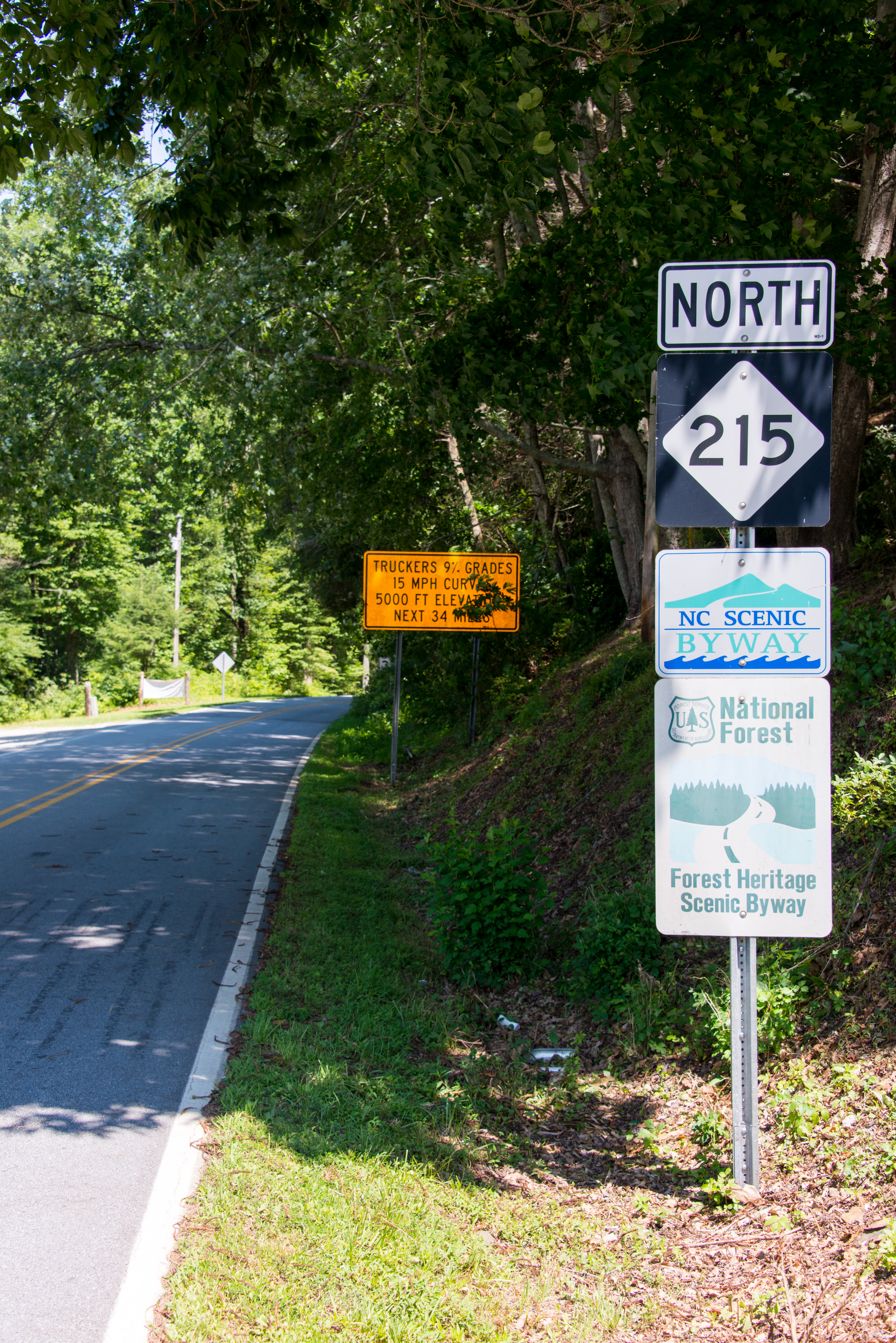
NC 215 is part of the Forest Heritage Scenic Byway

In Transylvania County, at the intersection with US 64 near Rosman, this road cuts through a path originally placed by the Gloucester Lumber Company, following the path of the North Fork of the French Broad River to its headwaters. Between US 64 and intersection of Macedonia Church Road (SR 1326), the highway has seven miles of narrow, winding, hairpin turns that are mostly surrounded by the Pisgah National Forest. In some areas the road is all that separates small mountain cliffs and steep ravines below the roadway. Within this seven mile stretch, the highway climbs 700 feet (210 m) in elevation from 2,200 feet (670 m) in elevation, at Rosman, to 2,900 feet (880 m) at the unincorporated community of Balsam Grove. This route is characterized as having a dense leafy canopy for much of the way during the summer season.

Northward beyond Macedonia Church Road, the highway has broader shoulders and has entered Balsam Grove, and serves as the primary route in and out of the area. There is a solitary gas station in this area that serves as the only stop along the route until reaching Jackson County.

After passing through Balsam Grove, the road returns into Pisgah National Forest, climbing rapidly for another 7 miles (11 km) through the Pinhook Valley, peaking at the intersection with the Blue Ridge Parkway at 5,300 feet (1,600 m). This section of the road climbs 2,400 feet (730 m) in 7 miles (11 km).

Along the way, you will find several spots to pull over to the side of the road to take a break from the curves, allow faster traffic to move on, or to provide relief for a carsick passenger.

== History ==
The highway defines the boundaries of the Shining Rock and Middle Prong wildernesses: Shining Rock lying to the east, and Middle Prong to the west. The right-of-way for the highway is all that separates the two for several miles, and several hiking trails start along parking areas on this road or on spur roads connecting to it. Several waterfalls along the West Fork or its tributaries can be seen from the road itself, especially during the winter after rainfall. Some can be accessed by hiking trails, but others are very remote making hiking to them difficult even though they can clearly be seen from the highway. This section of road is popular with tourists and with motorcyclists due to its curvy nature.

NC 215 was built on the right of way of two logging railroads.

== Future ==
North Carolina Department of Transportation plans to modernize a 5.04-mile (8.11 km) section of NC 215 between US 276 (Pigeon Road) to SR 1926 (Pisgah School Road). The project includes widening lanes to 12 feet (3.7 m) from the current 10 feet (3.0 m) and paved shoulders. At an estimated cost of $13.8 million, it is currently unfunded.

== Junction list ==
County	Location	mi	km	Destinations	Notes
Transylvania		0.0	0.0	US 64 – Rosman, Cashiers	
Jackson	No major junctions				
Transylvania	No major junctions				
Haywood		17.1	27.5	Blue Ridge Parkway	One-quadrant interchange
Haywood	Woodrow	35.0	56.3	US 276 south (Cruso Road) / NC 110 north (Pisgah Drive) – Brevard, Canton	South end of US 276 overlap; southern terminus of NC 110
Haywood	Woodrow	35.8	57.6	US 276 north (Pigeon Road) – Waynesville	North end of US 276 overlap
Haywood	Canton	41.7	67.1	US 19 / US 23 north (Main Street / Park Street)	North end of US 19/US 23 overlap
Haywood	Canton	42.1	67.8	US 19 / US 23 south (New Clyde Highway)	South end of US 19/US 23 overlap
Haywood	Canton	44.0	70.8	I-40 / US 74 / Buckeye Cove Road – Asheville, Knoxville	Exit 31 (I-40)
1.000 mi = 1.609 km; 1.000 km = 0.621 mi: Concurrency terminus
