= Cedar Mountain, North Carolina =

- Unincorporated Community
- Nickname: Cedar Mountain, NC
- Motto: Heart of the Hamlet
- Location within North Carolina Location within the United States
- Coordinates: 35°08′36″N 82°38′34″W
- Country: United States
- State: North Carolina
- County: Transylvania
- Elevation: 2,704 ft (824 m)
- Time zone: UTC-5 (Eastern (EST))
  - Summer (DST): UTC-4 (EDT)
- ZIP code: 28718
- Area code: 828
- GNIS feature ID: 1019581

Cedar Mountain is an unincorporated community in Transylvania County, North Carolina, United States. The community is located along the Greenville Highway (US 276)10 miles from downtown Brevard, N.C. and just several miles from the NC/SC state line. The ZIP code is 28718.
