= Middle Prong Wilderness =

Wilderness area in North Carolina, United States

- IUCN category Ib (wilderness area)
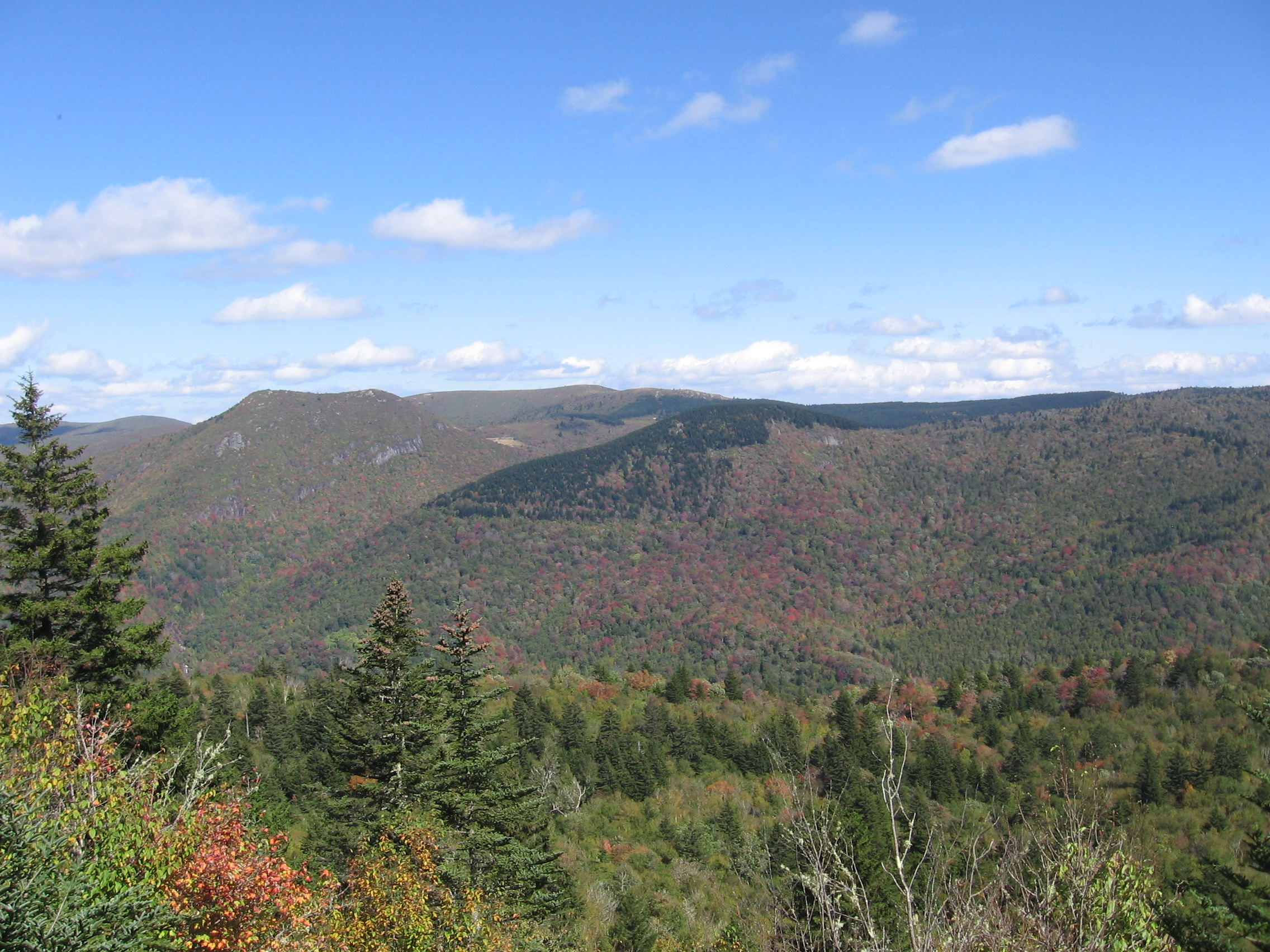
- Middle Prong Wilderness in North Carolina

- Location within the United States
- Location: Haywood County, North Carolina, USA
- Nearest city: Brevard
- Coordinates: 35°20′20″N 82°56′14″W
- Area: 7,900 acres (32 km^{2})
- Established: 1984
- Governing body: U.S. Forest Service
- Website: Middle Prong Wilderness

Middle Prong Wilderness, designated in 1984, covers 7,900 acres (32 km^{2}) within the Pisgah National Forest in Haywood County, Western North Carolina. The Wilderness Area spans steep, rugged high-elevation ridges ranging from 3,200 to over 6,400 feet, and the area gets its name from the Middle Prong of the Pigeon River finding whose headwaters are located in the area. NC 215 separates the wilderness from Shining Rock Wilderness to the northeast.

== See also ==
- List of U.S. Wilderness Areas
- Wilderness Act
