= Max Thompson (Medal of Honor) =

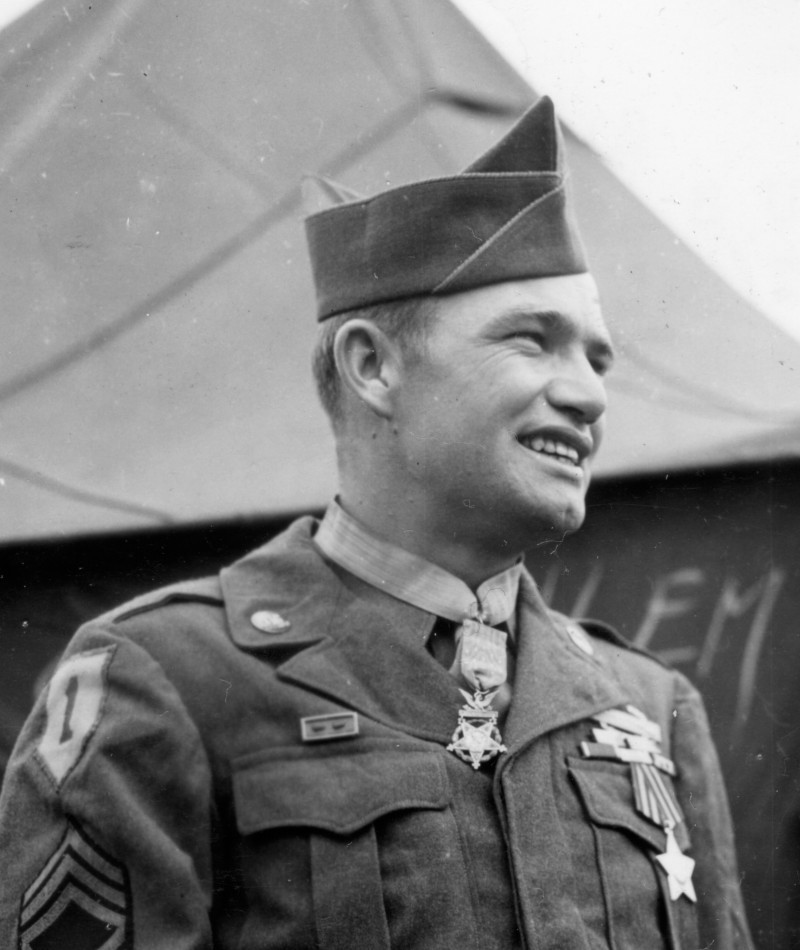
- Born: July 21, 1922; Bethel, Haywood County, North Carolina, US
- Died: November 30, 1996 (aged 74); Haywood County, North Carolina, US
- Burial place: Forest Lawn Cemetery, Enka, North Carolina
- Military career
- Allegiance: United States
- Branch: United States Army
- Rank: Technical Sergeant
- Units: 3rd Battalion, 18th Infantry Regiment, 1st Infantry Division
- Conflicts: World War II
- Awards: Medal of Honor; Purple Heart; Order of Glory Third Class (USSR)

Max Thompson (July 21, 1922 – November 30, 1996) was a United States Army soldier and a recipient of the United States military's highest decoration—the Medal of Honor—for his actions in World War II.

Born in the community of Bethel in Haywood County, North Carolina, Thompson joined the Army from Prescott, Arizona on 18 November 1942. By October 18, 1944, he was serving in Europe as a sergeant in Company K, 18th Infantry Regiment, 1st Infantry Division. During a battle on that day, near Haaren, Germany, he single-handedly attacked the German forces on several occasions. For his actions, he was awarded the Medal of Honor eight months later, on June 18, 1945. He was one of two people from Haywood County, North Carolina, to receive the medal in World War II, the other being William D. Halyburton, Jr.

In addition to the Medal of Honor, Thompson received the Bronze Star Medal, Purple Heart, Combat Infantryman's Badge, Presidential Unit Citation with two Oak Leaf Clusters, the Good Conduct Medal, the European–African–Middle Eastern Campaign Medal (with five service stars and bronze arrowhead device) and, from the Union of Soviet Socialist Republics (USSR), the Order of Glory Third Class. He attained the rank of Technical Sergeant before leaving the Army. After his military service, Thompson worked in Canton, North Carolina, for Champion International Paper's inspection department. He died at age 74 on November 30, 1996, and was buried at Forest Lawn Cemetery in Enka, North Carolina. A road in near Canton was renamed in his honor.

== Medal of Honor citation ==
Sergeant Thompson's official Medal of Honor citation reads:

On 18 October 1944, Company K, 18th Infantry, occupying a position on a hill near Haaren, Germany, was attacked by an enemy infantry battalion supported by tanks. The assault was preceded by an artillery concentration, lasting an hour, which inflicted heavy casualties on the company. While engaged in moving wounded men to cover, Sgt. Thompson observed that the enemy had overrun the positions of the 3d Platoon. He immediately attempted to stem the enemy's advance single-handedly. He manned an abandoned machinegun and fired on the enemy until a direct hit from a hostile tank destroyed the gun. Shaken and dazed, Sgt. Thompson picked up an automatic rifle and although alone against the enemy force which was pouring into the gap in our lines, he fired burst after burst, halting the leading elements of the attack and dispersing those following. Throwing aside his automatic rifle, which had jammed, he took up a rocket gun, fired on a light tank, setting it on fire. By evening the enemy had been driven from the greater part of the captured position but still held 3 pillboxes. Sgt. Thompson's squad was assigned the task of dislodging the enemy from these emplacements. Darkness having fallen and finding that fire of his squad was ineffective from a distance, Sgt. Thompson crawled forward alone to within 20 yards of 1 of the pillboxes and fired grenades into it. The Germans holding the emplacement concentrated their fire upon him. Though wounded, he held his position fearlessly, continued his grenade fire, and finally forced the enemy to abandon the blockhouse. Sgt. Thompson's courageous leadership inspired his men and materially contributed to the clearing of the enemy from his last remaining hold on this important hill position.

== See also ==
- List of Medal of Honor recipients for World War II
