= Shoal Creek (Huzzah Creek tributary) =

Stream in the US state of Missouri

Shoal Creek is a stream in southeastern Crawford County in the U.S. state of Missouri. It is a tributary of Huzzah Creek.

The stream headwaters arise in the southeast corner of Crawford County just west of Missouri Route Y and only about two miles north of the mine at Viburnum in the northwest corner of Iron County. The stream flows north to north-northwest to its confluence with Huzzah Creek just south of Huzzah.

Shoal Creek was named for the fact it is flat and shallow like a shoal.

== See also ==
- List of rivers of Missouri
- Shoal Creek (disambiguation)
