= Pisgah Astronomical Research Institute =

Observatory in North Carolina, US

- Smiley with 26 West in the background
- Observatory code: H70
- Location: Balsam Grove, North Carolina
- Coordinates: 35.1996°N 82.8724°W
- Altitude: 2,999 feet (914 m)
- Established: January 1999
- Website: pari.edu

Telescopes
- Solar Telescope: Coronado Solarmax 40 optical
- Polaris Telescope: 12-inch Cassegrain optical
- SPACE Telescope: 10-inch Cassegrain optical
- Furman/PARI Telescope: 0.35-meter Cassegrain optical
- PARSEC Telescope: 16-inch Cassegrain optical
- 26 meter East: 327 MHz radio
- 26 meter West: 1.4 and 4.8 GHz radio
- 12 meter: Precision surface 20 GHz radio
- 4.6 meter "Smiley": 21 cm (1.42 GHz) radio
- Sun / Jupiter Array: Automated tracking 17 to 30 MHz radio
- Eight Meter Transient Array: 29 to 47 MHz radio
- Related media on Commons

Pisgah Astronomical Research Institute (PARI; /ˈpæriː/ PAIR-ee) is a non-profit astronomical observatory located in the Pisgah National Forest near Balsam Grove, North Carolina. PARI operates multiple radio telescopes and optical telescopes for research and teaching purposes. The site is a Dark Sky Park, certified by DarkSky International in 2020. It is one of only two Dark Sky Parks in North Carolina. The observatory is affiliated with the University of North Carolina system through the Pisgah Astronomical Research and Science Educational Center (PARSEC). PARI is open to the public by appointment.

== History ==
PARI is located at the site of the former Rosman Satellite Tracking Station, which was established by the National Aeronautics and Space Administration (NASA) in 1962. The site was part of the worldwide Spacecraft Tracking and Data Acquisition Network and an integral communications link for the crewed space programs Project Gemini and Project Apollo. The Rosman Satellite Tracking Station, under NASA, was an unclassified facility and the site itself was open to the public.

The facility was transferred to the National Security Agency (NSA) in 1981. Known as the Rosman Research Station, it was used as a signals intelligence gathering location. In contrast to the site’s time under NASA, the NSA’s top-secret Rosman Research Station operated “under a shroud of secrecy” and was strictly closed to the public. In 1983, Transylvania County was off-limits to Soviet visitors. Locals suspected the ban was directly connected to the Rosman Research Station. Likely in part due to the end of the Cold War, the site was closed by the NSA in 1995 and transferred to the United States Forest Service.

After several years of inactivity, the federal government proposed to dismantle the facility. Recognizing the utility of the site, a small group of interested scientists and businessmen formed a not-for-profit foundation, which acquired the site in January 1999. It has continued capital investment at the facility, enabling updates of the equipment for astronomical observation purposes. A staff of professional astronomers, engineers, and other scientists work at the observatory.

In the early morning hours of Dec 24th, 2012, the institute was burglarized. Its collection of about 100 meteorites, valued at a minimum of $80,000 and with specimens weighing up to 80 pounds (36 kg), was stolen, along with about $100,000 worth of TVs, monitors, projectors, microscopes, and other scientific equipment. Much of the stolen property, including the meteorite collection, was recovered within a week.

In 2023, The History Press published Pisgah Astronomical Research Institute: An Untold History of Spacemen & Spies by local North Carolina author and former CIA senior executive, Craig Gralley. This nonfiction book explores the site’s past as a NASA satellite tracking station during the Space Race and as a top-secret NSA signals intelligence gathering facility during the Cold War. It details PARI’s inception and current mission of public STEM research and education.

== Research and education ==
PARI hosts research and study programs with Furman University, Clemson University, Virginia Tech, South Carolina State University, and Duke University. The PARI site has hosted several professional astronomy meetings, including the Small Radio Telescope Conference in August 2001, the Gamma-Ray Bursts Today and Tomorrow Conference in August 2002, and the Workshop on a National Plan for Preserving Astronomical Photographic Plates in November 2007. In partnership with the Smoky Mountains STEM Collaborative (SMSC), PARI held the 2022 NASA International Space Apps Challenge.

PARI presents several educational opportunities, including weekend and summer camps for campers of all ages. Prior to the program's end in 2020, PARI hosted the Duke University Talent Identification Program. PARI also sponsors astronomy educational programs using the portable StarLab planetarium. These have been presented to more than 40,000 people in Western North Carolina.

== Facilities ==
The principal radio research instruments at PARI are two 26-meter radio telescopes—referred to as 26-West and 26-East—and a 4.6-meter radio telescope named Smiley. These instruments are adapted for precision tracking of celestial radio sources using multiple frequencies. Smiley is used for remote classroom teaching of astronomy by students in the US and worldwide. According to PARI myth and legend, Smiley was given its pleasant face around 1982 as a greeting to overflying foreign surveillance satellites—particularly those belonging to the Soviet Union.

PARI is home to the Astronomical Photographic Data Archive (APDA), a facility designed to collect, preserve, and store astronomical photographic plates. These plates served as the primary recording medium for astronomy data from the late 1800s until the 1980s. Despite their proclaimed historic and scientific value, many of the estimated two million or more plates across the U.S. are in jeopardy of being destroyed due to lack of storage space, personnel, and maintenance. PARI’s APDA is the second largest plate repository in the world; boasting more than 460,000 glass plates from 83 observatories around the globe. The ultimate goal of APDA is to digitize the entire plate collection and create an online database accessible to the global community of scientists, researchers, and students. As part of a citizen science project initiated at PARI, referred to as Stellar Classification Online Public Exploration (SCOPE), internet users are able to observe and classify stars from digitized APDA plates.

PARI’s exhibit galleries display NASA and space shuttle artifacts, an extensive collection of gems and minerals, fossils, and a wide variety of meteorites—including those from Mars and the moon.

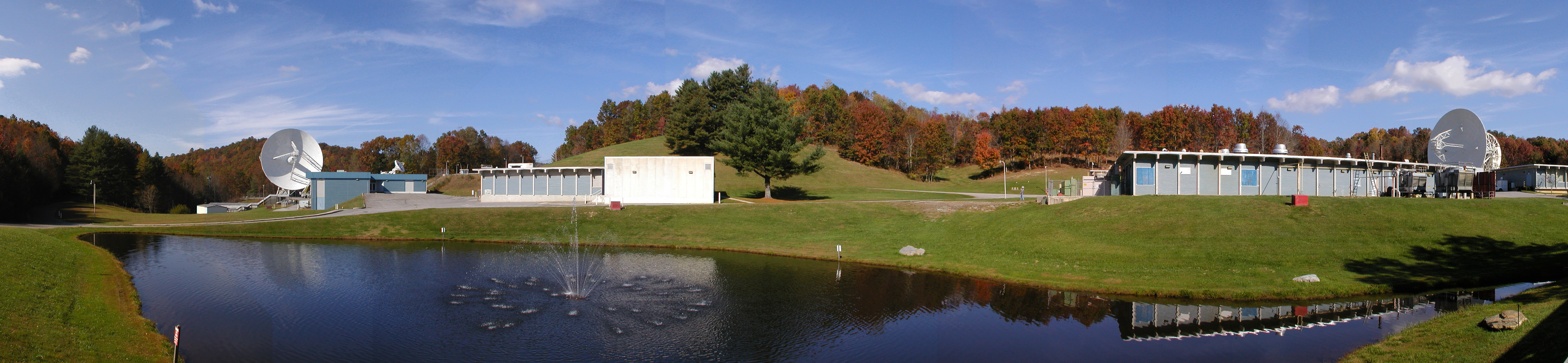
PARI Central Campus with 26-West and 26-East

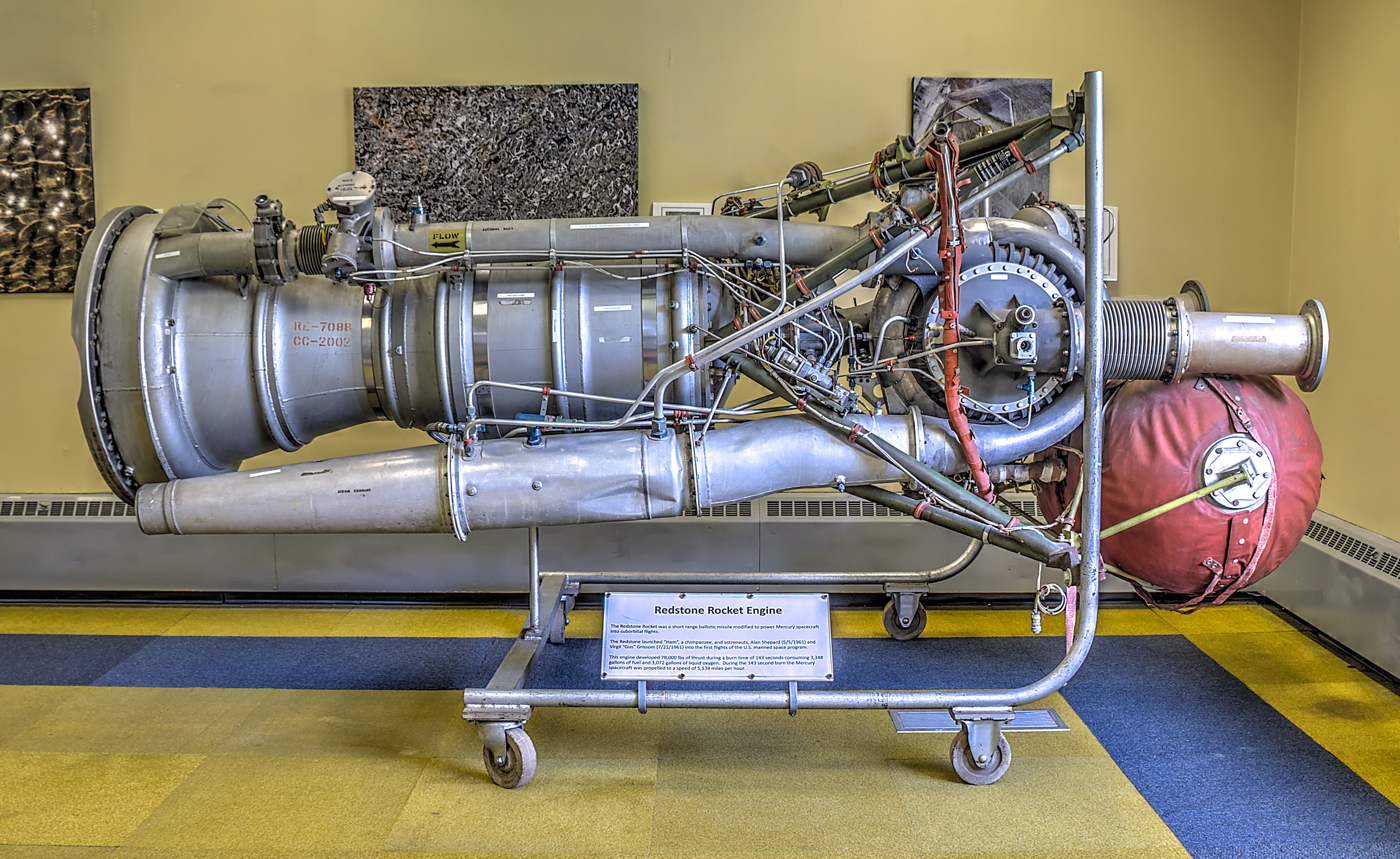
Redstone rocket engine on display

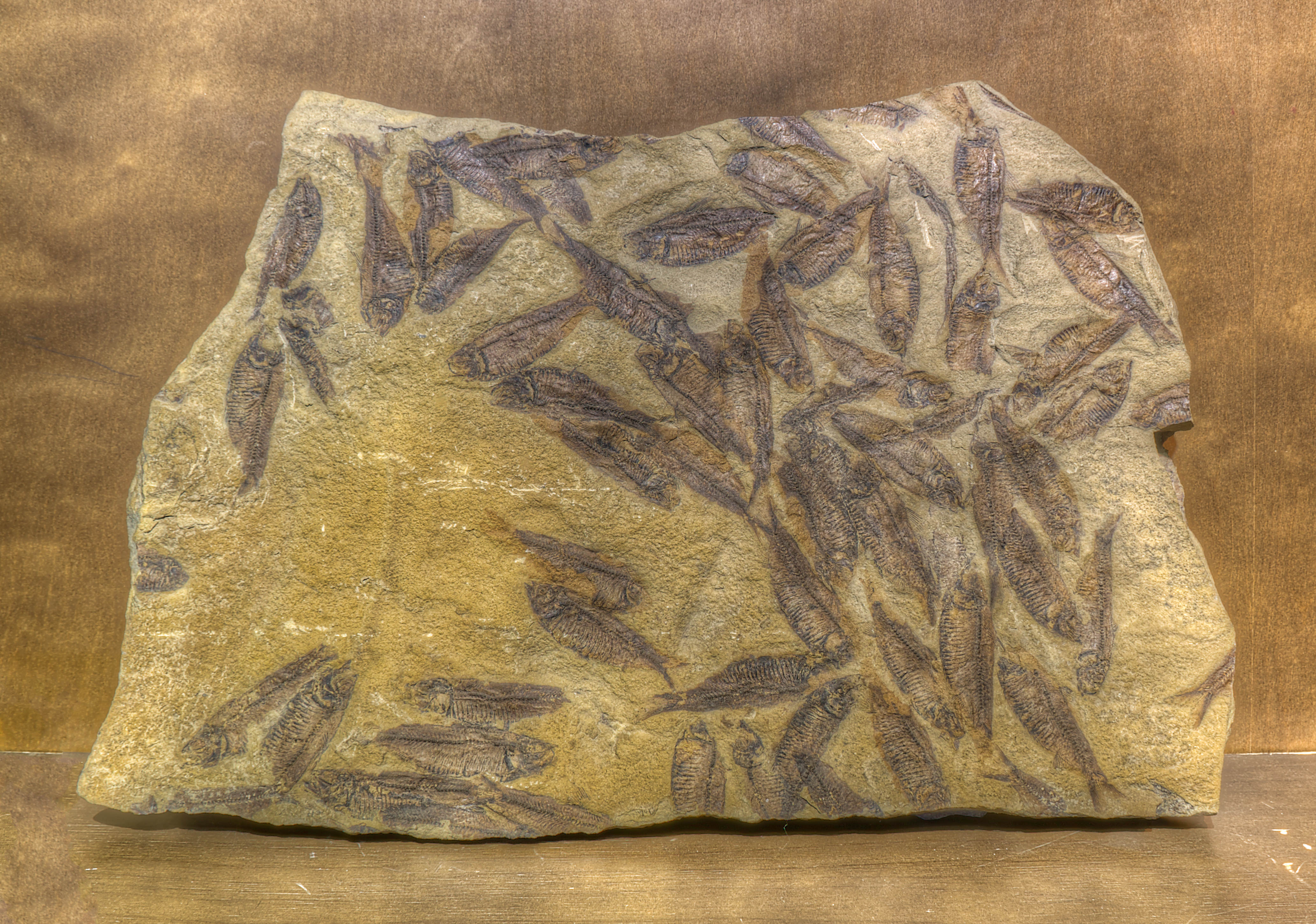
Knightia fossils from the Green River Formation

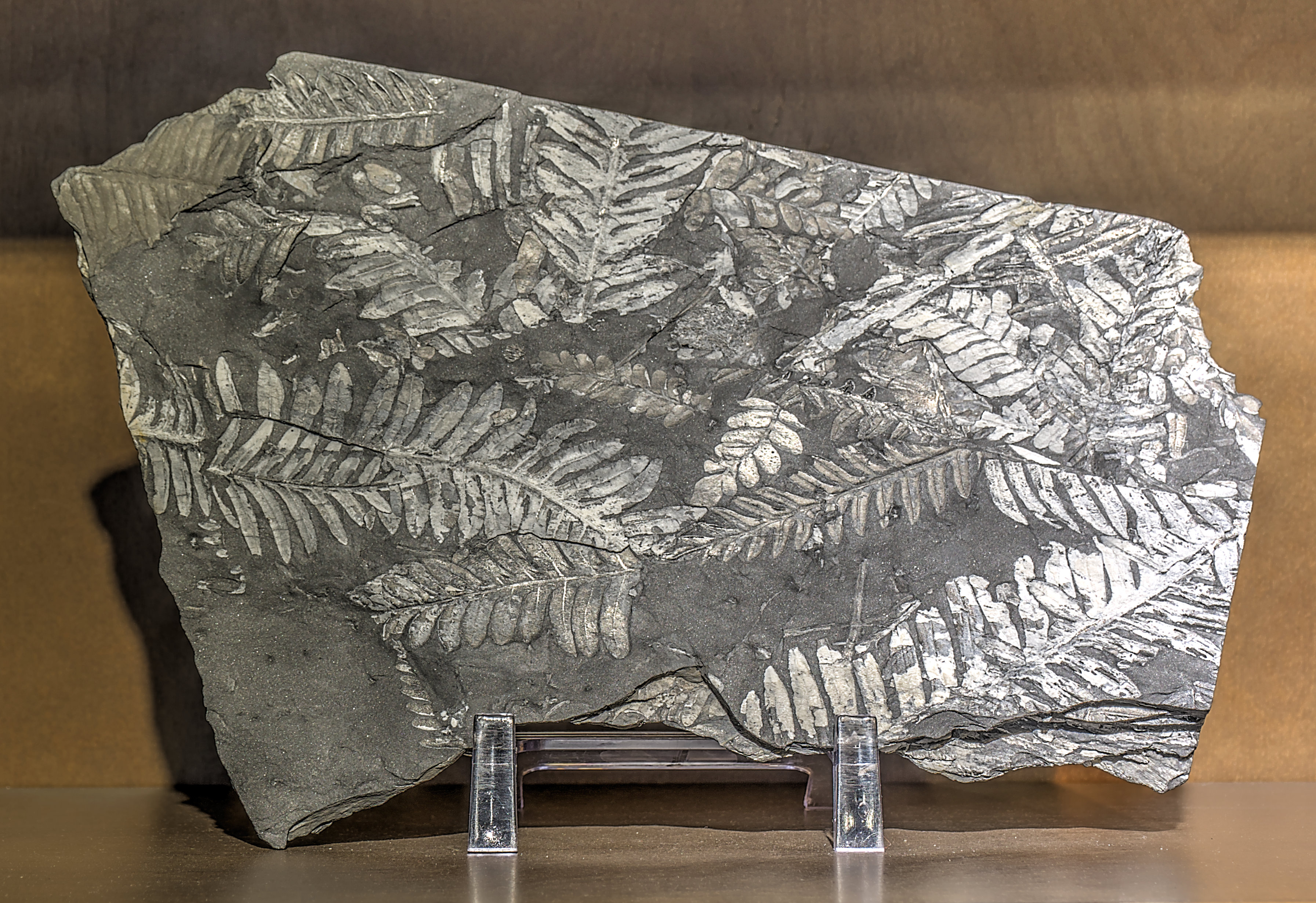
Carboniferous Ferns

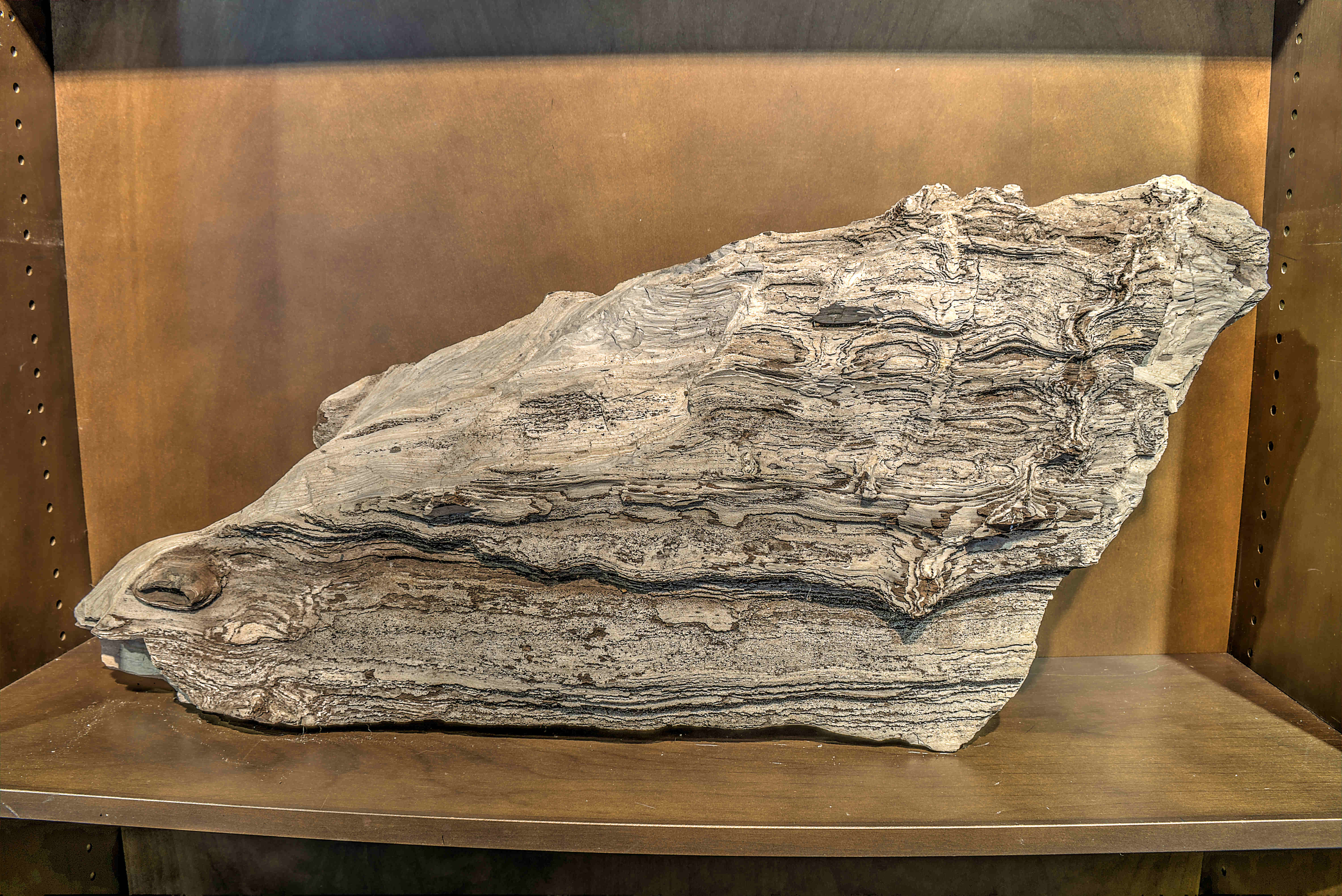
Petrified Wood

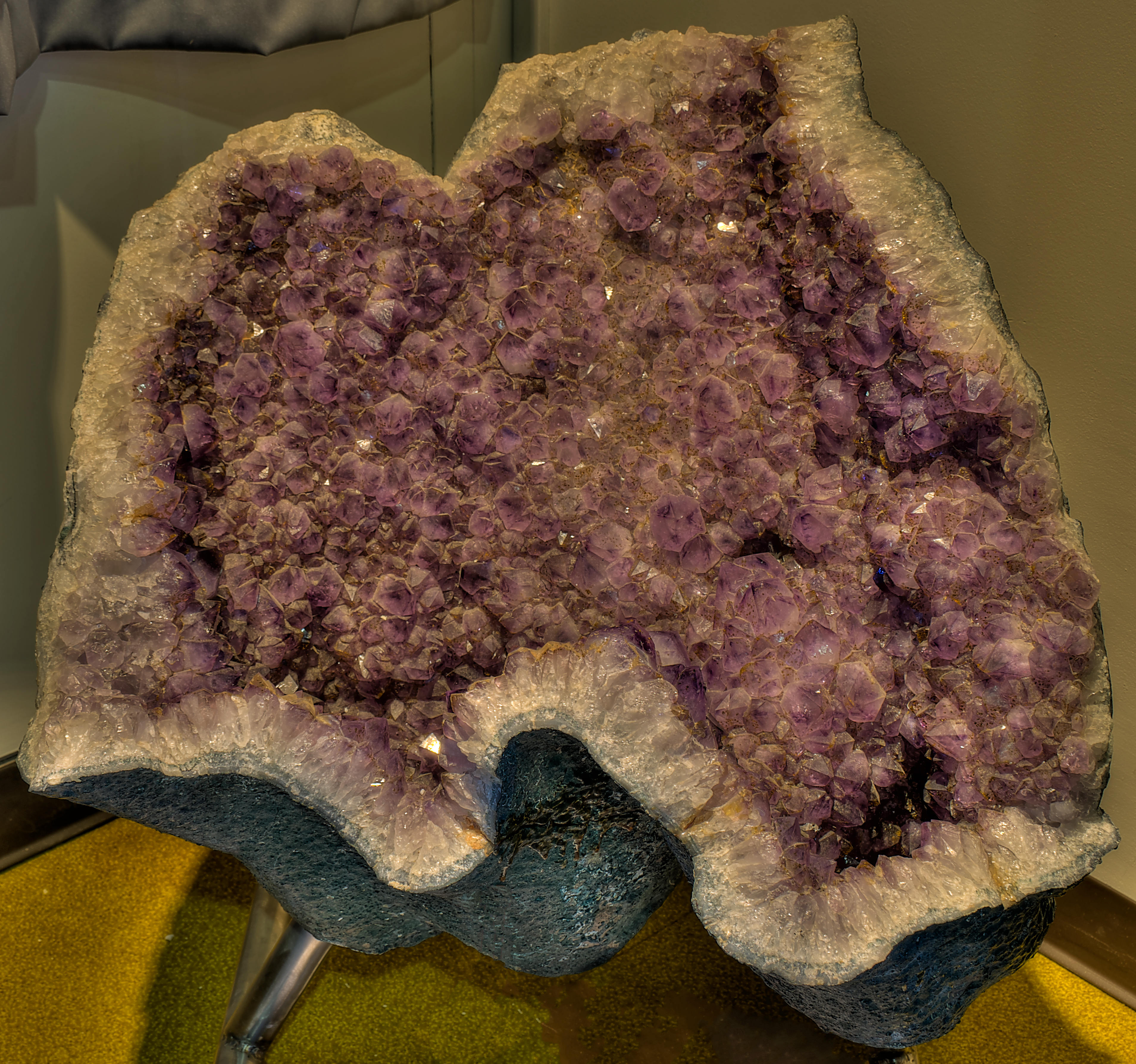
Brazilian Amethyst

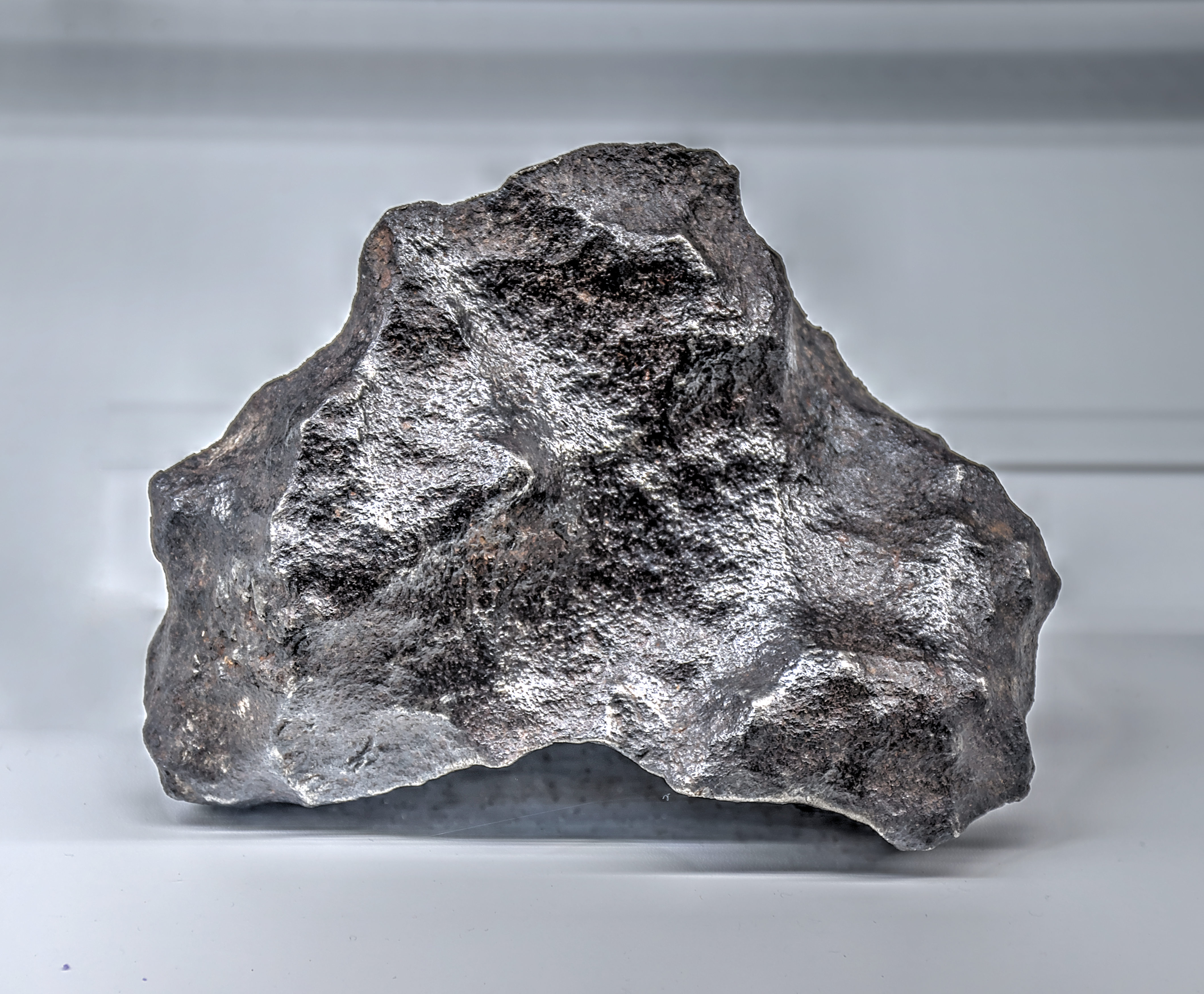
Toluca meteorite

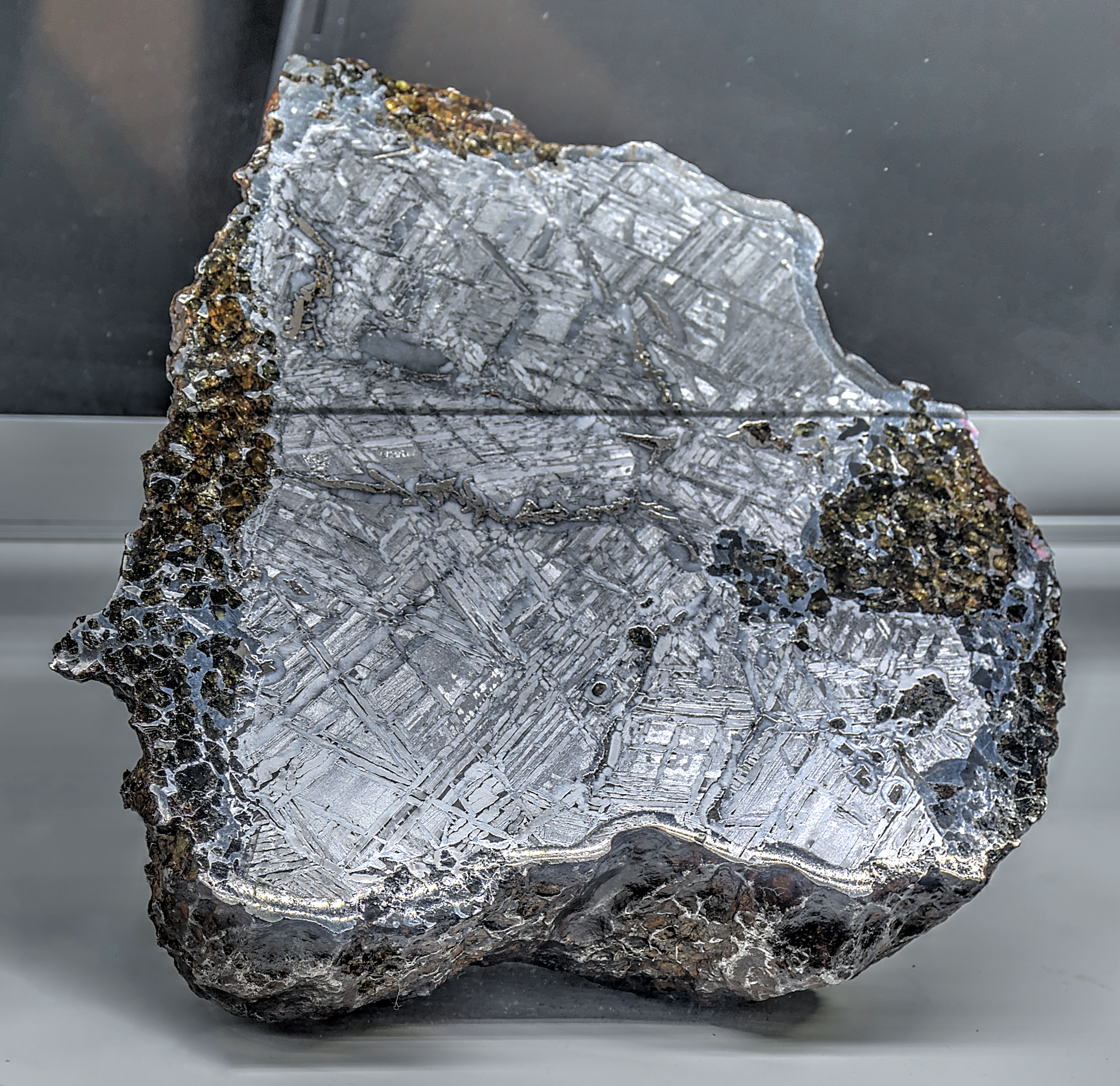
Seymchan meteorite

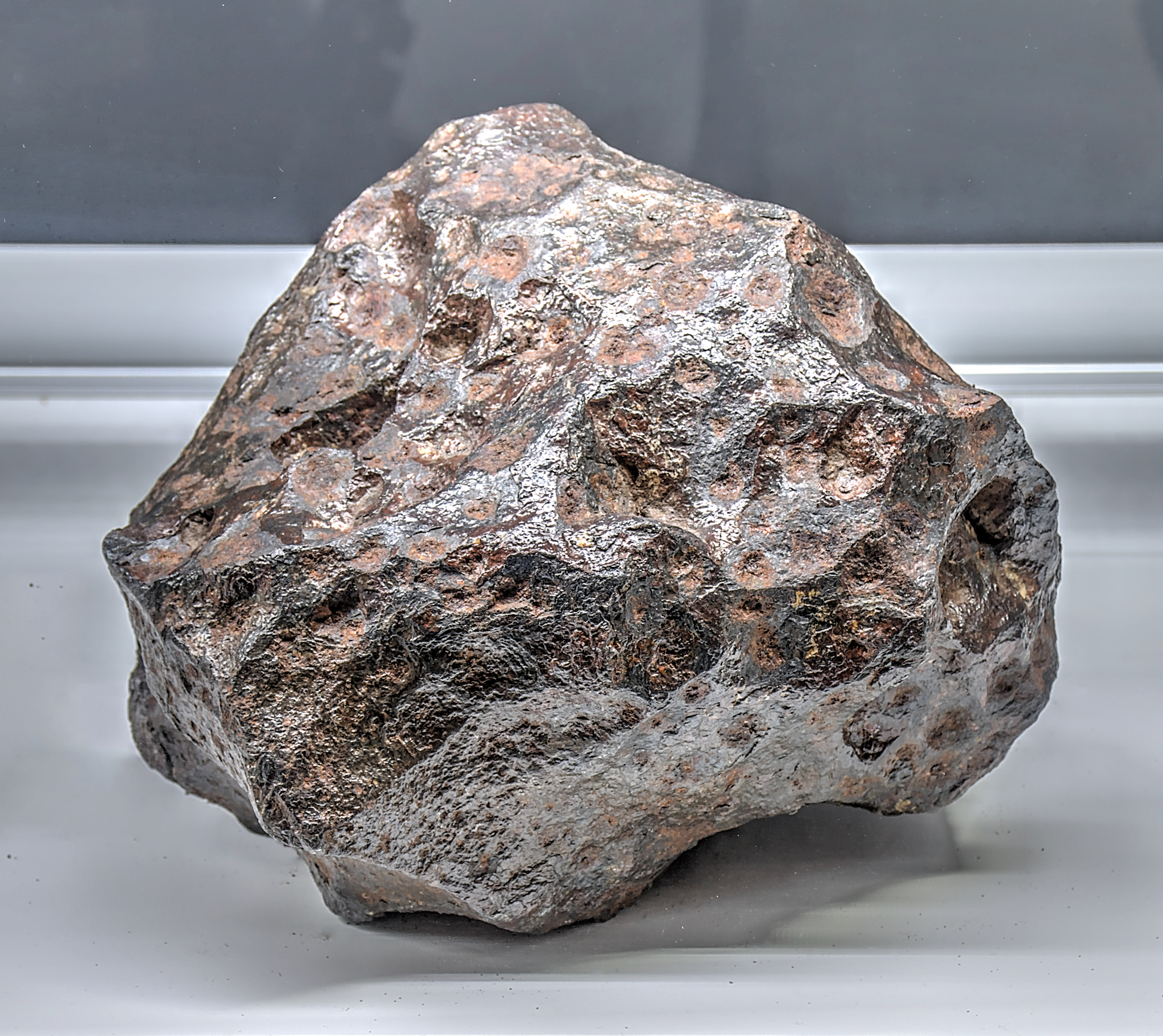
Canyon Diablo Meteorite

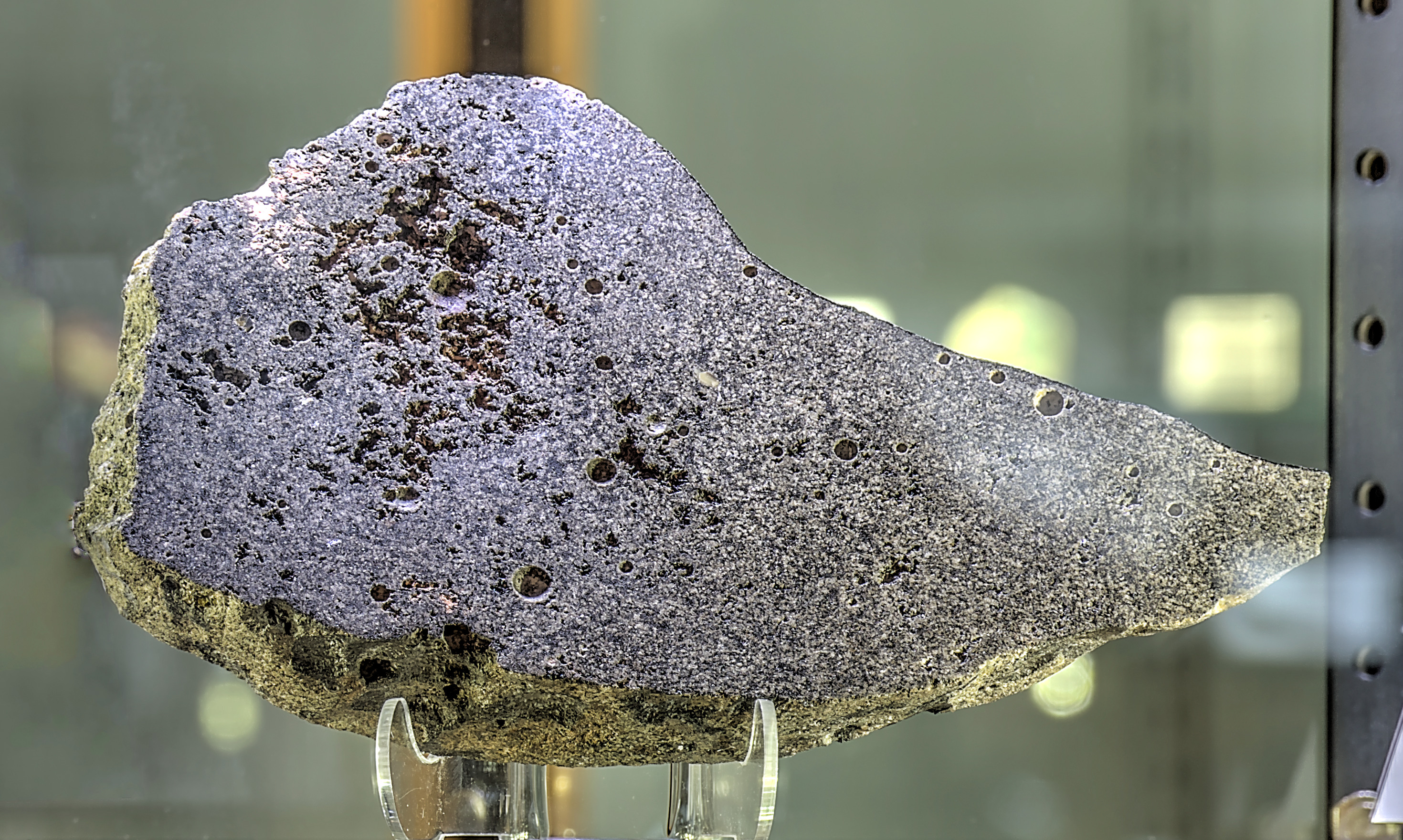
Fragment of D'Orbigny meteorite

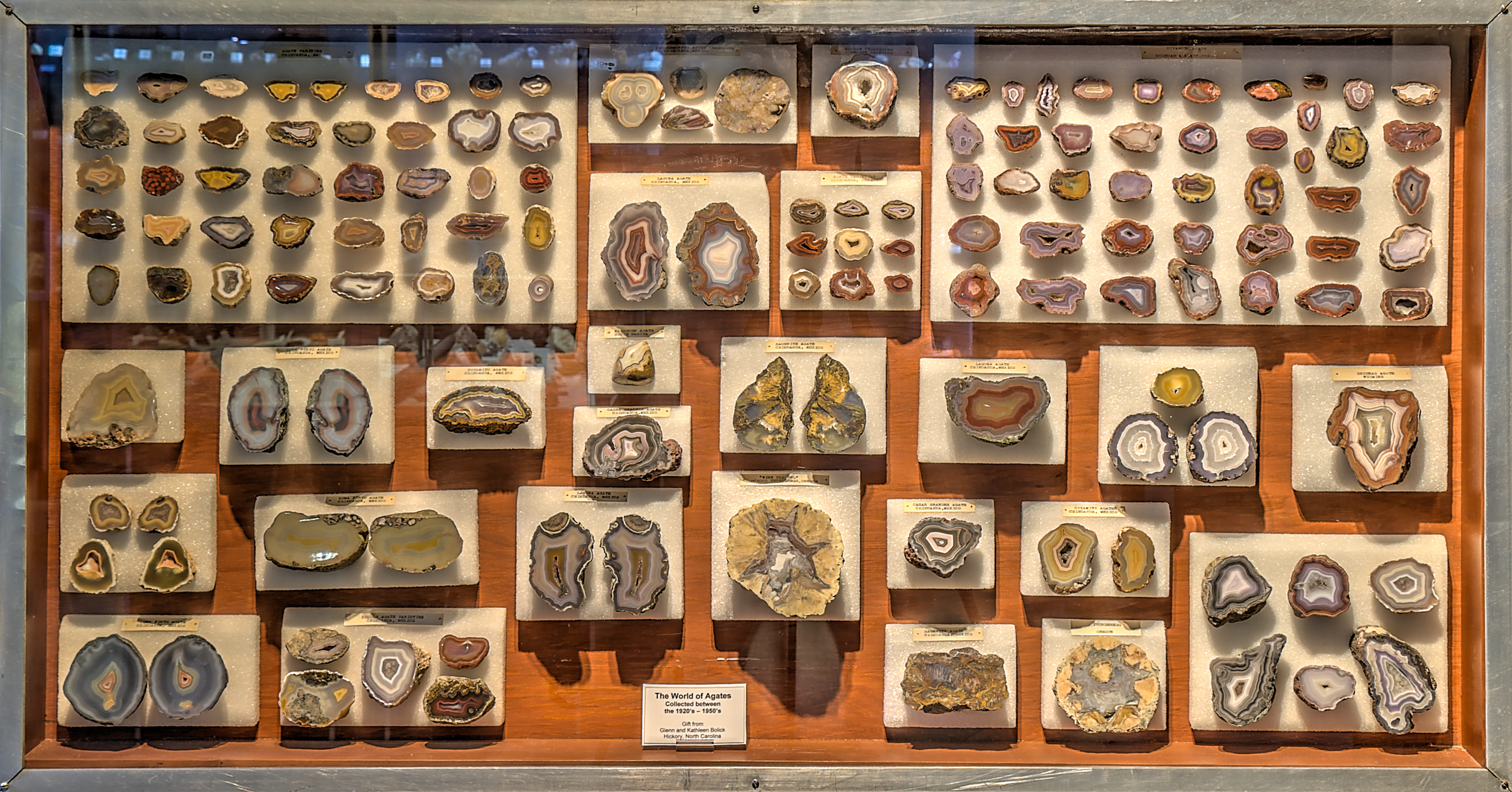
Agates collected between 1920 - 1950

== See also ==
- List of astronomical observatories
- List of radio telescopes

== General references ==
- Goldman, Stuart J. "Mission Possible: The Promise of Pisgah." Sky & Telescope. October 2001:42.
- Gralley, Craig. Pisgah Astronomical Research Institute: an untold history of spacemen and spies. Arcadia Publishing, 2023.
- Hargreaves, Lynley. "Spy Station Retooled into Astronomy Institute". Physics Today. March 2001 Volume 54, number 3.
