= Rosman, North Carolina =

- Town
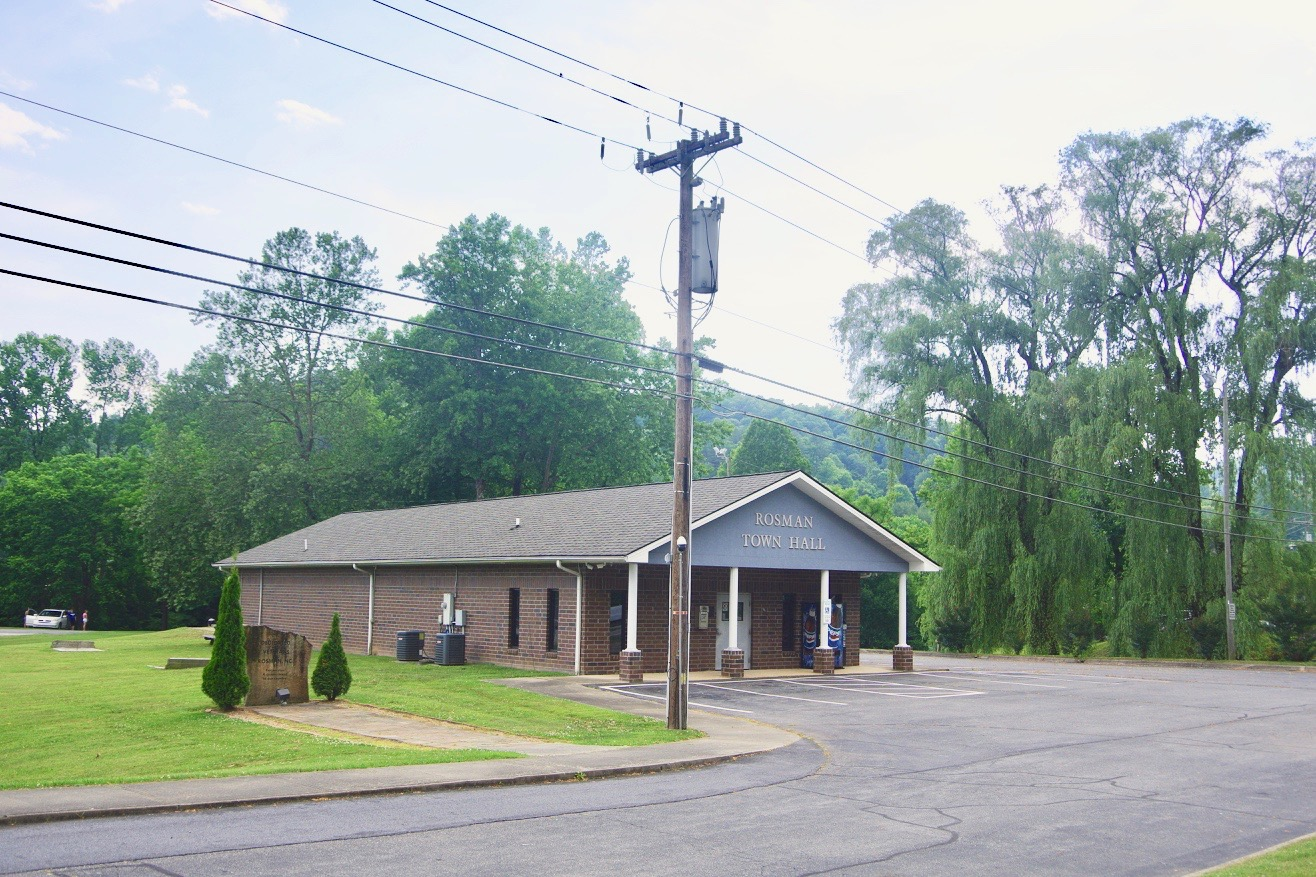
- Town hall

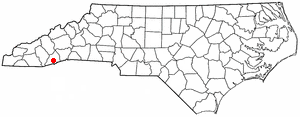
- Location of Rosman, North Carolina
- Coordinates: 35°08′45″N 82°49′13″W
- Country: United States
- State: North Carolina
- County: Transylvania
- Incorporated: 1901
- Named for: Joseph Rosenthal and Morris Ormansky

Area
  - Total: 0.54 sq mi (1.41 km^{2})
  - Land: 0.54 sq mi (1.41 km^{2})
  - Water: 0 sq mi (0.00 km^{2})
- Elevation: 2,290 ft (700 m)

Population (2020)
  - Total: 701
  - Density: 1,284.0/sq mi (495.75/km^{2})
- Time zone: UTC−5 (Eastern (EST))
  - Summer (DST): UTC−4 (EDT)
- ZIP code: 28772
- Area code: 828
- FIPS code: 37-58020
- GNIS feature ID: 2407248
- Website: https://www.townofrosman.com/

Rosman is a town in Transylvania County, North Carolina, United States. As of the 2020 census, Rosman had a population of 701. The northern terminus of U.S. Route 178 is less than one mile northwest of Rosman on U.S. Route 64.

The Pisgah Astronomical Research Institute is located approximately six miles north of Rosman, near Balsam Grove.

== History ==
Known first by European Americans as Jeptha, the settlement was known as "Toxaway" in the early 20th century. Because this caused confusion with the nearby resort town of Lake Toxaway (10 miles to the west), in 1903 the name was changed to "Eastatoe," the name of a historic Cherokee town in the area. It was also the name for nearby Eastatoe Gap and Eastatoe Falls. The Cherokee word for the Carolina parakeet was eastatoe.

Town residents promoted another change, and Joseph Silversteen (a local industrialist) suggested Rosman in 1905, after two of his business associates, Joseph Rosenthal and Morris Osmansky. This was approved.

== Geography ==
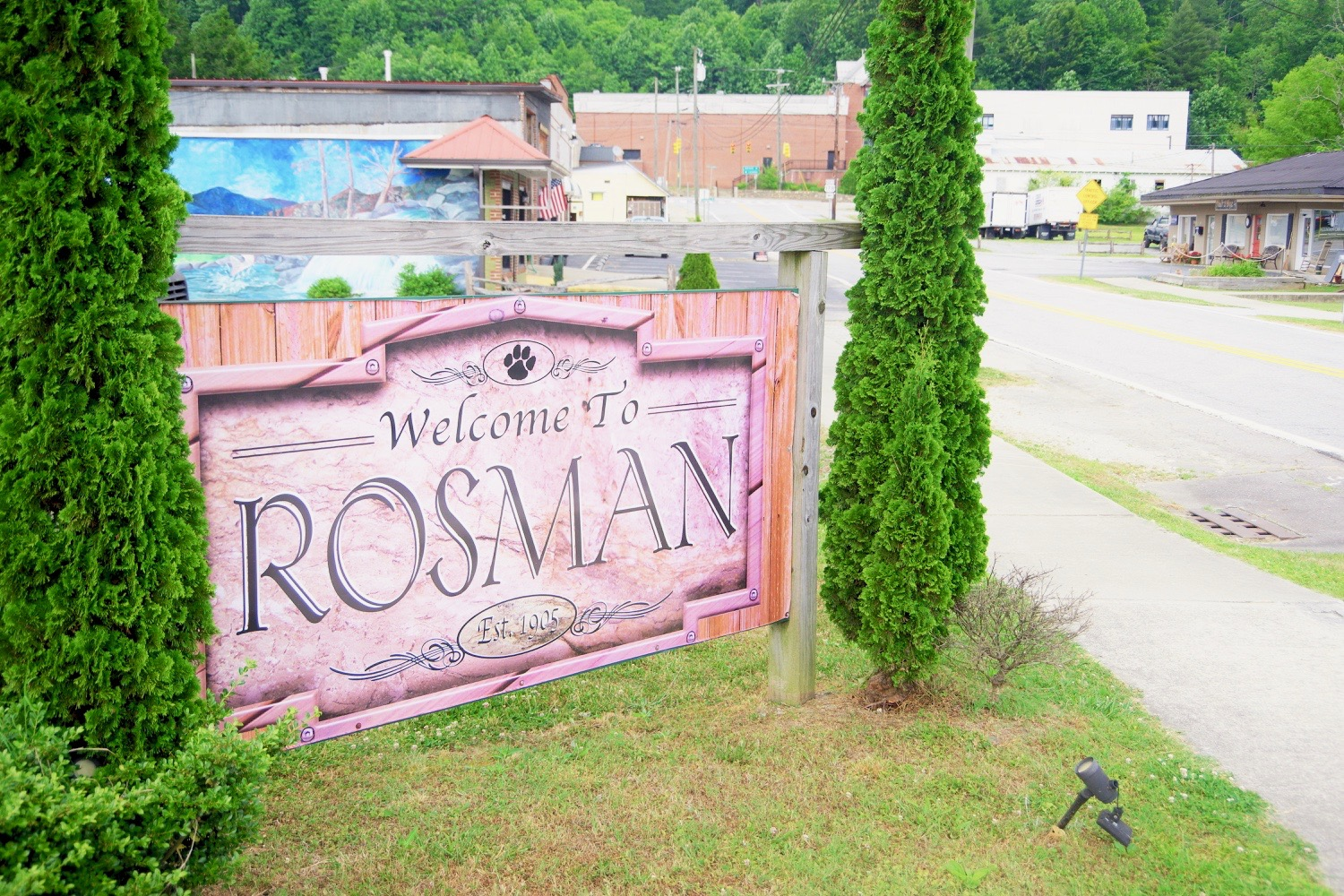
Welcome sign

According to the United States Census Bureau, the town has a total area of 0.4 square miles (1.0 km^{2}), all land.

Within the town limits of Rosman and to the south of the town limits, U.S. Route 178 is called Pickens Highway, referring to Pickens, South Carolina. South of Rosman, the highway continues across mountainous terrain through a series of switchback curves into South Carolina, eventually reaching Pickens.

Rosman sits on the eastern boundary of Pisgah National Forest.

The French Broad River runs through the town of Rosman. The river's origin, where the North Fork French Broad and the West Fork French Broad converge to form the river proper, lies just west of the town. A USGS stream gauge station, number 03439000, is located on the French Broad River in Rosman.

The climate is very wet, with a mean annual rainfall since 1936 of 79.54 inches (2,020.3 mm)—one of the highest in the US east of the Cascades. The record annual rainfall of 129.60 inches (3,291.8 mm) in 1964 is the second heaviest for a calendar year within this region, only 0.54 inches (13.7 mm) behind Mount Washington’s record from 1969.

== Demographics ==
Historical population
Census	Pop.	Note	%±
1910	145		—
1920	527		263.4%
1930	484		−8.2%
1940	529		9.3%
1950	535		1.1%
1960	419		−21.7%
1970	407		−2.9%
1980	512		25.8%
1990	385		−24.8%
2000	490		27.3%
2010	576		17.6%
2020	701		21.7%
U.S. Decennial Census

=== 2020 census ===
Rosman racial composition
Race	Number	Percentage
White (non-Hispanic)	568	81.03%
Black or African American (non-Hispanic)	15	2.14%
Native American	7	1.0%
Other/Mixed	44	6.28%
Hispanic or Latino	67	9.56%

As of the 2020 United States census, there were 701 people, 240 households, and 104 families residing in the town.

=== 2000 census ===
As of the census of 2000, there were 490 people, 210 households, and 149 families residing in the town. The population density was 1,140.7 inhabitants per square mile (440.4/km^{2}). There were 236 housing units at an average density of 549.4 per square mile (212.1/km^{2}). The racial makeup of the town was 98.57% White, 0.20% Asian, and 1.22% from two or more races. Hispanic or Latino of any race were 1.22% of the population.

There were 210 households, out of which 33.3% had children under the age of 18 living with them, 46.2% were married couples living together, 20.5% had a female householder with no husband present, and 28.6% were non-families. 24.8% of all households were made up of individuals, and 11.0% had someone living alone who was 65 years of age or older. The average household size was 2.33 and the average family size was 2.77.

In the town, the population was spread out, with 26.1% under the age of 18, 7.6% from 18 to 24, 28.6% from 25 to 44, 20.8% from 45 to 64, and 16.9% who were 65 years of age or older. The median age was 37 years. For every 100 females, there were 89.9 males. For every 100 females age 18 and over, there were 89.5 males.

The median income for a household in the town was $20,179, and the median income for a family was $24,219. Males had a median income of $21,500 versus $21,042 for females. The per capita income for the town was $9,626. About 23.1% of families and 25.9% of the population were below the poverty line, including 25.6% of those under age 18 and 35.8% of those age 65 or over.

== Camps ==
Rosman is home to The Wilds Christian Camp and Conference Center, as well as Ridge Haven.

== Schools ==
The schools in the Rosman area include Rosman Elementary & TC Henderson Elementary, Rosman Middle and Rosman High School. Rosman's athletic teams are nicknamed the Tigers.
