= Cove Creek, North Carolina =

Unincorporated community in North Carolina, US

- Unincorporated community Census-designated place
- Location within North Carolina Location within the United States
- Coordinates: 36°16′35″N 81°46′59″W
- Country: United States
- State: North Carolina
- County: Watauga

Area
  - Total: 8.54 sq mi (22.13 km^{2})
  - Land: 8.54 sq mi (22.12 km^{2})
  - Water: 0.0039 sq mi (0.01 km^{2})
- Elevation: 2,802 ft (854 m)

Population (2020)
  - Total: 1,068
  - Density: 125.1/sq mi (48.29/km^{2})
- Time zone: UTC-5 (Eastern (EST))
  - Summer (DST): UTC-4 (EDT)
- Area code: 828
- GNIS feature ID: 2584313

Cove Creek is an unincorporated community and census-designated place in Watauga County, North Carolina, United States. As of the 2020 census, Cove Creek had a population of 1,068.

== Geography ==
According to the U.S. Census Bureau, the community has an area of 8.513 square miles (22.05 km^{2}); 8.509 square miles (22.04 km^{2}) of its area is land, and 0.004 square miles (0.010 km^{2}) is water.

== Demographics ==
Historical population
Census	Pop.	Note	%±
2020	1,068		—
U.S. Decennial Census
