= Shoal Creek (Soque River tributary) =

Stream in Georgia, U.S.

Coordinates: 34°43′57″N 83°30′19″W

Shoal Creek is a stream in Georgia, and is a tributary of the Soque River. The creek is approximately 11.94 miles (19.22 km) long.

== Course ==
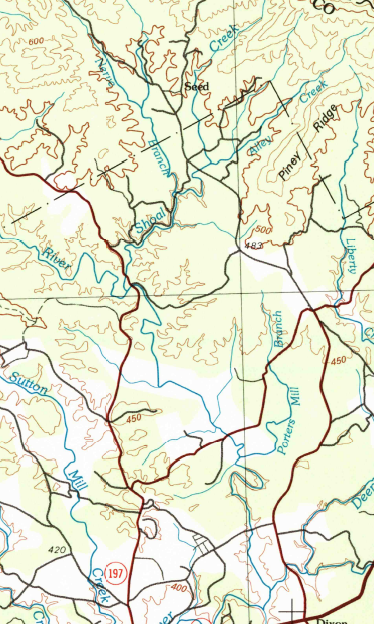
Topographic map showing Shoal Creek and the Upper Soque River

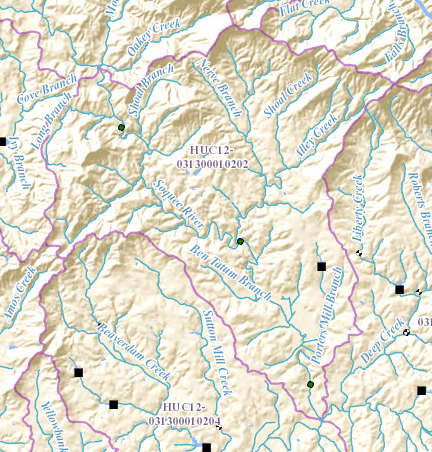
Map showing the Upper Soque River and its sub-watershed (outlined in pink), with Shoal Creek

Shoal Creek rises in northern Habersham County, Georgia, south of Lake Rabun, and runs in a southerly direction for approximately 2.6 miles, before it joins with Alley Creek, coming from its east. Just under a mile further on, Shoal Creek picks up Nerve Branch, and continues southward for 1.3 miles to cross State Route 197, just before flowing into the Soque River west of the highway.

== Sub-watershed details ==
The creek watershed and associated waters is designated by the United States Geological Survey as sub-watershed HUC 031300010202, is named the Upper Soque River sub-watershed, and drains an area of approximately 28 square miles west of Turnerville, and north and east of the Soque River. In addition to Shoal Creek, the area is drained by Ben Tatum Branch and Porters Mill Branch, both of which flow into the Soque south of where Shoal Creek joins the river, and east of State Route 197.

== See also ==
- Water Resource Region
- South Atlantic-Gulf Water Resource Region
- Apalachicola basin
- Shoal Creek Country Music Park
