= Dellwood, North Carolina =

- Populated place
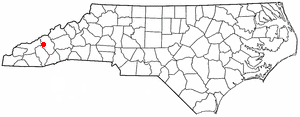
- Location of Dellwood, North Carolina
- Coordinates: 35.523°N 83.028°W
- Country: United States
- State: North Carolina
- County: Haywood
- Elevation: 1,040 ft (317 m)
- Time zone: UTC-5 (Eastern (EST))
  - Summer (DST): UTC-4 (EDT)
- ZIP code: 28751
- Area code: 828
- GNIS feature ID: 1010778

Dellwood is a populated place within the town of Maggie Valley in Haywood County, North Carolina, United States.

== History ==
Prior to European colonization, the area that is now Dellwood was inhabited by the Cherokee people and other Indigenous peoples for thousands of years. The Cherokee in Western North Carolina are known as the Eastern Band of Cherokee Indians, a federally recognized tribe.

== Geography ==
Dellwood is located at latitude 35.523 and longitude -83.028. The elevation is 2,753 feet.
