= Eastatoe Falls =

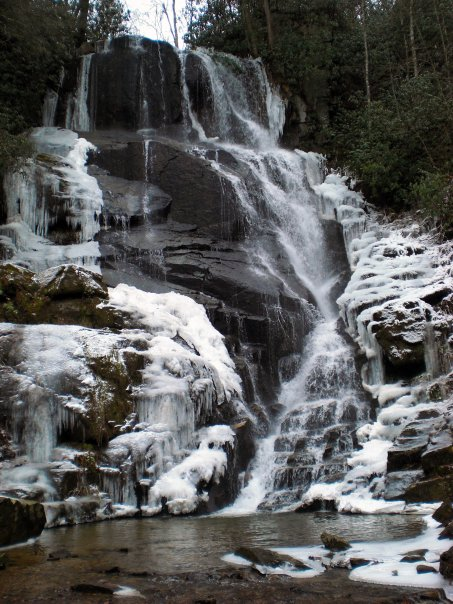
- Eastatoe Falls
- Interactive map of Eastatoe Falls
- Location: Pisgah National Forest, Rosman, Transylvania County, North Carolina
- Coordinates: 35°6′42.35″N 82°49′0.63″W
- Type: Tiered cascading
- Total height: 60 ft (18 m)

Eastatoe Falls /ˈɛstətoʊ/ is a waterfall in Western North Carolina, United States, located on private property near the town of Rosman. The public was once allowed access, but as of 2019, the property has been sold, and it has been closed to the public.

== Shoal Creek ==
Shoal Creek rises in the Pisgah National Forest between Nancy Mountain and Burnt Mountain near the Eastatoe Gap. The creek descends over 200 feet (61 m) over 0.25 miles (0.40 km), culminating in the 60-foot (18 m) series of drops over granite bedrock at Eastatoe Falls. The creek continues on past the falls to join with other tributaries to form the Middle Fork French Broad River.

== Natural history ==
Eastatoe was the name of a local, historic Cherokee town. It was also their term in Cherokee for the Carolina parakeet. Ownership of the falls has changed throughout the years, as has the name. The falls has also been called Will Hines Falls, Shoal Creek Falls, and Rosman Falls.

== Visiting the falls ==
The falls is located on private property whose owners once allowed access. As of late 2019, it was renamed as Shoal Creek Falls, and is no longer open to the public.

== Nearby falls ==
Claypole Falls drains the cove to the west of Eastatoe Falls, but is located on private property and is not accessible to the public.

Buttermilk Falls is located on private property off State Road 1105.

Other falls in the region include:

- Pounding Mill Falls
- Chestnut Falls
- Kiesee Falls
- Dill Falls
- French Broad and Mill Shoals Falls
- Bird Rock Falls
- Courthouse Falls
- Boren Mill Shoals
- Gravely Falls

== See also ==
- List of waterfalls
- List of waterfalls in North Carolina
