= Shoal Creek Country Music Park =

Concert venue near Lavonia, Georgia, U.S.

- Interactive map of Shoal Creek Country Music Park
- Location: Shoal Creek; 3191 State Rte 366; Lavonia, Georgia, U.S.
- Coordinates: 34°27′2.16″N 83°2′25.8″W
- Elevation: 850 feet (260 m)
- Owner: Zeke Sayer
- Operator: Zeke Sayer
- Capacity: 6,000
- Acreage: 162 (originally); 29 (currently)

Construction
- Opened: May 5, 1962; 64 years ago
- Architects: Alton Walters; Bertha Mae Walters

Website
- gypsyfarm.net

Shoal Creek Music Park (also known colloquially as Shoal Creek and Gypsy Farm) is a recording studio and former amphitheater in Hart County, Georgia. It is owned and operated by Zeke Sayer. The venue is best recognized by its namesake, Shoal Creek, which the venue runs alongside of.

While the venue in its time as an amphitheater (1962–2011) was primarily known for hosting concerts and music festivals, other events of various types and sizes were held throughout the year.

The venue played host to a wide variety of acts throughout the years, with notable performers including; The Carter Family, Roy Acuff, Marty Robbins, George Jones, Tammy Wynette, Dolly Parton, Porter Wagoner, Ernest Tubb, Johnny Cash, Ralph Stanley, Merle Haggard, Jerry Lee Lewis, Buck Owens, Skeeter Davis, Conway Twitty, The Statler Brothers, The Louvin Brothers, Hank Williams Jr., David Allan Coe, Loretta Lynn, Barbara Mandrell, and Ronnie Milsap, among numerous others.

== History ==
=== 1960s-1970s ===
Conway Twitty at Shoal Creek on July 12, 1975.

In 1961 Alton and Bertha Mae Walters purchased a 162 acre farm, they would turn it into a concert venue on the suggestion of Bill Anderson. On May 5, 1962, the venue would open, hosting Mel Tillis as their first ever act, with him and his band playing on a small stage constructed from a former sand house.

An indoor venue was added to the park in 1967. The indoor portion was expanded in 1971 to a seating capacity of 3,500, allowing the facility to host events at capacity during rain and winter months. Its first concert played host to Dolly Parton and Porter Wagoner on Halloween 1971.

In the 1970s, the Georgia State Bluegrass Festival launched at the park, hosting acts such as Bill Monroe, Lester Flatt, The Osborne Brothers, Jim & Jesse, Jimmy Martin, Ralph Stanley, Mac Wiseman, The Country Gentlemen, J. D. Crowe, and Doc Watson.

In 1975, founder Alton Walters was recognized by the CMA for his contributions to the venue and development of country music.

=== 1980s-Present ===
In the 1980s, the park started to decline as costs increased and managing the facility became more difficult. In May 1989, Clem Sayer purchased the facility, and would begin to add additions onto the facility.

Clem Sayer would pass away in his sleep at the park on February 15, 2011. The park played host to its final performance in May 2011, in a 3 day memorial festival in Clem's honor.

The park still operates as a recording studio today under the guidance of Clem's son, Zeke Sayer.

== Notable performances ==
=== 1960s ===
- Mel Tillis — Inaugural concert on May 5, 1962.
- Porter Wagoner, Dolly Parton, and Speck Rhodes — August 29, 1967
- Ralph Stanley & The Clinch Mountain Boys, The Osborne Brothers, and Bill Monroe & The Bluegrass Boys — July 26, 1969
- Del Reeves — August 2, 1969

=== 1970s ===
- Charlie Louvin and Skeeter Davis — May 30, 1970
- Stonewall Jackson — June 27, 1970
- Loretta Lynn — July 18, 1970
- Nat Stuckey — August 1, 1970
- Carl Smith and Jean Shepard — August 8, 1970
- Hank Snow and Lester Flatt — August 15, 1970
- Conway Twitty — August 22, 1970
- Ray Price — September 5, 1970
- George Jones — September 6, 1970
- Mel Tillis — September 12, 1970
- David Houston — September 19, 1970
- Faron Young — September 26, 1970
- Jerry Lee Lewis — September 27, 1970
- Tompall Glaser & The Glaser Brothers — June 19, 1971
- David Houston and Barbara Mandrell — June 26, 1971
- Dolly Parton and Porter Wagoner — Performed 1st concert at indoor venue, October 31, 1971
- Cal Smith — April 21, 1973
- Mother Maybelle Carter and The Carter Family — May 12, 1973
- Dolly Parton and Porter Wagoner — May 20, 1973
- Tom T. Hall — June 9, 1973
- Ernest Tubb & The Texas Troubadours — June 16, 1973
- Conway Twitty — June 23, 1973
- Charlie Rich — June 30, 1973
- George Jones and Tammy Wynette — July 13, 1973
- Hank Williams Jr. — July 14, 1973
- Johnny Cash — September 15, 1973
- Conway Twitty — July 12, 1975
- David Allan Coe — August 14, 1976
- Mel Street — September 25, 1976
