= Bethel, Haywood County, North Carolina =

Bethel, North Carolina
- Unincorporated community
- Location within North Carolina Location within the United States
- Coordinates: 35°28′24″N 82°53′45″W
- Country: United States
- State: North Carolina
- County: Haywood
- Elevation: 2,700 ft (820 m)
- Time zone: UTC-5 (Eastern (EST))
  - Summer (DST): UTC-4 (EDT)
- Area code: 828
- GNIS feature ID: 1019108

Bethel is an unincorporated community in Haywood County, North Carolina, United States.

== History ==
Prior to European colonization, the area that is now Bethel was inhabited by the Cherokee people and other Indigenous peoples for thousands of years. The Cherokee in Western North Carolina are known as the Eastern Band of Cherokee Indians, a federally recognized tribe.

== Notable person ==
Max Thompson (1922–1996), Medal of Honor recipient, was born in Bethel.
