= Balsam Grove, North Carolina =

Balsam Grove
- Unincorporated community
- Location within the state of North Carolina
- Coordinates: 35°13′46″N 82°52′25″W
- Country: United States
- State: North Carolina
- County: Transylvania
- Elevation: 2,828 ft (862 m)
- Time zone: UTC-5 (Eastern (EST))
  - Summer (DST): UTC-4 (EDT)
- ZIP codes: 28708
- GNIS Feature ID: 1018945

Balsam Grove is an unincorporated community located in Transylvania County, North Carolina within Pisgah National Forest and Nantahala National Forest.

The Pisgah Astronomical Research Institute is located in Balsam Grove.
