= Tuscola–Pisgah rivalry =

High school football rivalry in the United States

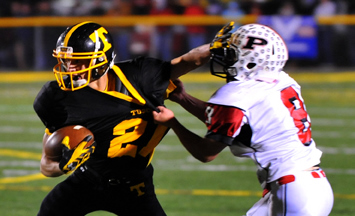
Tuscola vs. Pisgah
Haywood County Championship
First Meeting	September 23, 1966
First Result	Pisgah 26 – Tuscola 12
Latest Meeting	October 9, 2026
Latest Result	Tuscola 21 – Pisgah 0
Next Meeting	TBA, 2027
Largest Victory	Tuscola: 36 points (1982); Pisgah: 46 points (2006)
Longest Streak	Tuscola, 10 (1978-1987)
Current Streak	Tuscola, 1 (2026-)
All-time Series	Pisgah leads 33-29-1

The Tuscola–Pisgah rivalry, also referred to as the Pisgah-Tuscola Rivalry, the Haywood County Championship Game, and the County Clash is one of the best known and fiercest high school football rivalries in the southeastern United States. It has also been named the best high school rivalry in the state of North Carolina by USA Today. It typically draws between 10,000 and 15,000 fans per year. The intensity of the rivalry is caused by the fact that these are the only two high school football teams in Haywood County, North Carolina and are located less than 9 miles apart.

Tuscola High School is located on a hill outside Waynesville, North Carolina that serves students from the western part of the county, primarily Waynesville, Maggie Valley, Crabtree, Fines Creek, Jonathan Creek, and western portions of Clyde. Pisgah High School is located on the banks of the Pigeon River in Canton, North Carolina and serves students from the eastern part of the county, primarily Canton, Beaverdam, Bethel, Cruso, and eastern Clyde.

The game pays for half of each team's athletics programs for the next two years. The most ever to attend a game was 13,000 at Pisgah in 2016. Home games for Tuscola are played at C.E. Weatherby Stadium at Waynesville Middle School, where attendance is over 10,000, three times that of a normal game.

== History of the Rivalry ==
=== Waynesville vs. Canton (1922–1966) ===
The first meeting between Waynesville Township High School and Canton High School took place in 1922. The Waynesville Township High School Mountaineers and Canton High School Black Bears would meet in an intense battle.

=== Pisgah Dominates Early Years (1966–1971) ===
The intensity of the rivalry only grew when the county consolidated all of Haywood County's high schools into two in 1966. The first "Haywood County Championship" game between the new schools took place on September 23, 1966. Pisgah got off to an impressive start in the series, winning the first seven meetings. Pisgah would go on to win the 3A Football State Championship in 1966 and 1969.

After 16 years as the coach of first the Canton Bears and then the Pisgah Bears, with a 133-32-7 record and three championships, Boyd Allen was taken to the hospital during the October 17, 1969 game. He died at age 46 and his death was announced at the end of the game.

=== Rivalry Becomes More Competitive as Tuscola Rises (1972–1977) ===
During this period, the two teams won 3 games each and tied once. Tuscola won its first game in the series on November 17, 1972 when the Mountaineers got revenge on the Black Bears in the NCHSAA State Playoffs and went on to take the 1972 State Championship title. Tuscola would win the next two meetings before a 1974 playoff meeting ended in a tie. Since overtime was not yet included in NCHSAA rules, Pisgah was allowed to advance based on total yardage in the game. Following the 1974 tie, Pisgah went on to answer Tuscola's 3-game winning streak with 3 wins of their own. During this era Pisgah won the 3A Football State Championship in 1975 and 1976.

=== Tuscola Wins 10 Straight (1978–1987) ===
Tuscola was not content with its 3–10–1 series record and defeated the Bears every year for an entire decade, a winning streak which still holds the record as the longest in series history. By the time Tuscola finished its 10-year winning streak, the Mountaineers held the series lead 13–10–1.

=== Rivalry Balances Out (1988–2006) ===
Pisgah finally put Tuscola's winning streak to an end with a 19–0 shutout of the Mountaineers on November 4, 1988. As the rivalry game moved into the 1990s, the series became more balanced with Tuscola winning 1989–1990, Pisgah winning 1991–1993, Tuscola winning 1994–1995, Pisgah winning 1996, Tuscola winning 1997, and Pisgah winning 1998–1999. Since the turn of the millennium in 2000, the series has been the most balanced it has ever been. In a Friday the 13th match up that Tuscola fans dubbed "Nightmare on Pisgah Street", Tuscola won the first meeting of the new millennium 23–21 on October 13, 2000. From 2001 to 2006, the series went in pairs with Pisgah winning 2001 and 2002, Tuscola winning 2003 and 2004, and Pisgah winning 2005 and 2006. Pisgah's 56-10 beat down of Tuscola in 2006 was the largest margin of victory by any team in series history.

=== Tuscola Dominates Late 2000s, Early 2010s (2007–2012) ===
After the most humiliating loss in the rivalry's history, Tuscola surged back in 2007 and shocked the Black Bears 22-6 en route to the first three-peat by either team in the rivalry since the early '90s. Tuscola won 5 out of 6 meetings during this period. The 2008 game was the first to be played on an artificial turf surface, and was the first game of any kind ever played on Pisgah's artificial turf. Tuscola hung up a banner and printed shirts that read "Breaking in Your Turf- Mountaineer Style" before fulfilling their promise by defeating the Bears 28–10. In October 2009, the game returned to conference play as both teams joined the NCHSAA's 2A/3A split WNC Athletic Conference (Pisgah remained 2A and Tuscola remained 3A). Since 2009, the game has been given national attention by the Great American Rivalry Series which is sponsored by the United States Marines. Online audio and video broadcasts have been made available nationwide by iHigh and a player from each team receives a scholarship. In 2009, Tuscola quarterback Tyler Brosius received the MVP award, and the Tuscola team received a trophy for winning the game 41–10. In 2010, Pisgah's Matthew Inman received the MVP award after returning a blocked field goal 81 yards for a touchdown as time expired in the first half- swinging the game's momentum in Pisgah's favor- ultimately winning the trophy for the Bears. In 2011, the Mountaineers and Bears fought to the finish and nearly took the game into overtime when Pisgah tied the ball game with 7 seconds remaining. However, a roughing the kicker penalty against Tuscola was accepted by Pisgah, who opted to take the tying point off the board and go for a two-point conversion. Pisgah's attempt to win the game in regulation was denied when Hunter Creson tackled Josh Noland at the one-yard line to save the game for the Mountaineers, 28–27, the closest margin of victory by either team in series history. In 2012, the rivalry game went into overtime for the first time in history with the Mountaineers winning 24–21 on a field goal by Logan Lambert. The MVP award went to Tuscola's Bryce Myers who returned a kickoff for a touchdown to swing the game in the Mountaineers' favor before halftime.

=== Pisgah Dominates Mid to Late 2010s (2013–2019) ===
While the stakes in the rivalry increased once before when Tuscola and Pisgah joined the 2A/3A split WNCAC in 2009, even more was put on the line when it was announced that Pisgah would join Tuscola in the 3A classification for the 2013-2017 realignment. For the first time in many years, the rivalry not only affected conference title hopes, but also state title hopes (as the two teams became eligible to meet each other in the NCHSAA playoffs). On October 18, 2013, the two schools met for the 50th time. Pisgah made a huge statement in their first year as a 3A school by beating Tuscola 27–7 in their first win at C.E. Weatherby Stadium since 2005. Senior quarterback McKinley Brown received the MVP award. The 2014 match up started out as an intense game with several lead changes in the first three quarters. Pisgah found themselves down to Tuscola 20–16 in the third quarter before scoring 21 unanswered points late to win the game 37–20. In the 2015 contest, Tuscola jumped out to a 10–0 lead late in the first half. Just before halftime, Pisgah QB Houston Rogers connected on a touchdown pass to Trey Morgan to cut the lead to 10–7. In the second half, RB Daniel "Dutch Count" VanVaerenbergh scored on a touchdown run and with the PAT, Pisgah led 14–10. Late in the 4th quarter, Tuscola drove down the field and scored a touchdown to lead 17–14. Pisgah had enough time to tie the score at 17–17 on a Tanner Fox field goal, sending the game into overtime. After failing to score on its first three downs, Pisgah again turned to kicker Tanner Fox, who nailed the field goal to give Pisgah a 20–17 lead. In its first possession of overtime, Tuscola drove inside the 1 yard line, and then elected to go for the TD on 4th and goal. Initially stopped by the Pisgah line, QB Zach Webster pitched it to another Tuscola player, who tried to lateral to another. The ball was fumbled, and Pisgah recovered the ball to seal the win. Pisgah RB Daniel "Dutch Count" VanVaerenbergh was named the game's MVP. In 2016, a match up between two 7-0 teams with WNCAC title hopes on the line went into overtime for a second straight year (and third time in five years) as Pisgah rallied from a 17-0 halftime deficit to defeat the Mountaineers 23–20. Pisgah's Chase Henson had a crucial interception late in the game and was voted the MVP. This marked the first game that Tuscola had been held under 40 points all season. Because so much was on the line, the game drew a massive crowd of over 13,000 and sent the half-and-half raffle winner home with over $19,000. In 2017, the rivalry was moved back to a non-conference game on Labor Day weekend due to the NCHSAA realignment. Pisgah won the game 31–10 to regain the series lead for the first time since 1982. Though Tuscola held on to a slight lead for much of the 2018 game, Pisgah fought back in the second half to win the game 20–10. Pisgah won the final game of the decade in a 14–0 shutout at C.E. Weatherby Stadium on September 6, 2019 to extended its winning streak to seven games, finishing the 2010s with an 8–2 record against its rival.

=== Tuscola vs. Pisgah in the 2020s, (since 2020) ===
The first matchup of the new decade was set to take place on September 4, 2020 and would have been Tuscola's first rivalry game under new head coach Chris Brookshire, but the game did not take place on that date due to the COVID-19 pandemic. The North Carolina High School Athletic Association postponed all high school football in the state until February 2021 with teams only allowed to play seven games, prioritizing conference opponents. Because Tuscola and Pisgah were not in the same conference at the time, there was initially some concern over whether the two teams would be able to play each other. If the game had been canceled rather than postponed, it would have marked the first season in which Tuscola and Pisgah did not play since the schools were formed. The game was finally scheduled for February 26, 2021 after the Western Mountain Athletic Conference (in which Tuscola played) announced that its teams would play a six-game slate with one bye week, opening up the opportunity to play one non-conference game. The attendance was limited to 30% capacity due to the pandemic with families of players getting first preference, though it was broadcast locally by WMYA-TV and streamed online for fans who could not attend in person. Smoky Mountain Cinema in Waynesville also showed the game live to a limited audience. The game was played in the rain and featured a lot of turnovers and sloppy play by both teams. It looked like the game would be close early when Tuscola answered Pisgah's opening touchdown with a kickoff return to the end zone but the return was called back and Pisgah maintained their lead for the entire game, eventually pulling away 44–14. The game played on February 26 is regarded as the game for the 2020 football season despite being played in the 2021 calendar year.

The October 15, 2021 edition of the game returned the rivalry to conference play as a result of realignment and once again had conference title and playoff implications as both teams entered the game undefeated in the conference. Tuscola held the lead for most of the game, including a 20-7 halftime lead, but Pisgah took a 21-20 lead in the 4th quarter. Tuscola attempted a 49 yard field goal with 26 seconds remaining that likely would have given them the win but the kick was blocked and Pisgah extended their winning streak to 9 games.

The 2022 game celebrated a century of Haywood County Football (including the Waynesville Township vs. Canton years). The game was originally to be held at Pisgah Memorial Stadium but was moved to C.E. Weatherby Stadium due to flood damage. Though the game was played on Tuscola’s home turf, Pisgah remained the designated home team. Due to a dispute between the two schools, Pisgah briefly considered moving the game to Bethel Middle School but backtracked because of safety concerns. After a slow start, Tuscola rallied to tie the game at 21 late in the fourth quarter and took its first lead of the game 28-21 in overtime before Pisgah answered and took the game into double overtime for the first time in the rivalry’s history. Tuscola then took a 35-28 lead before Pisgah answered again. This time Pisgah went for the win and attempted a pass for a two point conversion, but the pass fell incomplete and Tuscola walked away with a 35-34 win (which snapped their 9 game losing streak in the series). As a result, Tuscola’s 10 game winning streak from 1978-1987 remains the sole longest streak in the history of the rivalry.

Friday the 13th of October 2023 marked the first rivalry game for Jonathan Crompton as Tuscola’s head coach. Crompton first played in the rivalry as Tuscola’s quarterback 20 years prior. Wearing the same #8 that his coach once wore for the Mountaineers, quarterback Jed West earned the Great American Rivalry Series MVP award after leading his team to a 27-10 win over a favored 6-1 Pisgah team in the rain.

2024 was the first rivalry game to be played at Pisgah Memorial Stadium since the 2020 season (played on February 26, 2021 due to the COVID-19 pandemic) because of flooding caused by the remnants of Hurricane Fred in 2021 and Hurricane Helene in 2024. The game was originally scheduled to be played on October 11 but was rescheduled to November 8th, allowing time for the stadium to be repaired. The Black Bears won the game 10-7 on their home turf which had been underwater just weeks prior.

== Scores (1966–present) ==
Date	Tuscola Mountaineers		Pisgah Black Bears		Site
September 23, 1966	Tuscola	12	Pisgah	26	Pisgah Memorial Stadium
September 22, 1967	Tuscola	7	Pisgah	15	C.E. Weatherby Stadium
October 19, 1968	Tuscola	13	Pisgah	28	Pisgah Memorial Stadium
October 17, 1969	Tuscola	8	Pisgah	18	C.E. Weatherby Stadium
October 30, 1970	Tuscola	7	Pisgah	21	Pisgah Memorial Stadium
October 1, 1971	Tuscola	0	Pisgah	35	C.E. Weatherby Stadium
September 30, 1972	Tuscola	0	Pisgah	17	Pisgah Memorial Stadium
November 17, 1972	Tuscola	16	Pisgah	6	Pisgah Memorial Stadium
September 19, 1973	Tuscola	28	Pisgah	7	C.E. Weatherby Stadium
September 20, 1974	Tuscola	12	Pisgah	7	Pisgah Memorial Stadium
November 22, 1974	Tuscola	13	Pisgah	13	Pisgah Memorial Stadium
October 31, 1975	Tuscola	6	Pisgah	14	C.E. Weatherby Stadium
October 30, 1976	Tuscola	14	Pisgah	38	Pisgah Memorial Stadium
October 28, 1977	Tuscola	14	Pisgah	30	C.E. Weatherby Stadium
October 27, 1978	Tuscola	23	Pisgah	16	Pisgah Memorial Stadium
November 2, 1979	Tuscola	33	Pisgah	9	C.E. Weatherby Stadium
October 31, 1980	Tuscola	14	Pisgah	0	Pisgah Memorial Stadium
October 30, 1981	Tuscola	27	Pisgah	10	C.E. Weatherby Stadium
October 29, 1982	Tuscola	50	Pisgah	14	Pisgah Memorial Stadium
October 28, 1983	Tuscola	14	Pisgah	7	C.E. Weatherby Stadium
November 9, 1984	Tuscola	28	Pisgah	7	Pisgah Memorial Stadium
November 8, 1985	Tuscola	20	Pisgah	6	C.E. Weatherby Stadium
November 8, 1986	Tuscola	24	Pisgah	14	Pisgah Memorial Stadium
November 6, 1987	Tuscola	28	Pisgah	13	C.E. Weatherby Stadium
November 4, 1988	Tuscola	0	Pisgah	19	Pisgah Memorial Stadium
September 15, 1989	Tuscola	17	Pisgah	3	C.E. Weatherby Stadium
September 15, 1990	Tuscola	21	Pisgah	14	Pisgah Memorial Stadium
September 20, 1991	Tuscola	3	Pisgah	7	C.E. Weatherby Stadium
September 18, 1992	Tuscola	20	Pisgah	24	Pisgah Memorial Stadium
September 17, 1993	Tuscola	7	Pisgah	24	C.E. Weatherby Stadium
September 16, 1994	Tuscola	28	Pisgah	22	Pisgah Memorial Stadium
September 15, 1995	Tuscola	34	Pisgah	22	C.E. Weatherby Stadium
September 20, 1996	Tuscola	7	Pisgah	8	Pisgah Memorial Stadium
October 17, 1997	Tuscola	10	Pisgah	7	C.E. Weatherby Stadium
October 17, 1998	Tuscola	7	Pisgah	25	Pisgah Memorial Stadium
October 8, 1999	Tuscola	14	Pisgah	20	C.E. Weatherby Stadium
October 13, 2000	Tuscola	23	Pisgah	21	Pisgah Memorial Stadium
September 7, 2001	Tuscola	14	Pisgah	21	C.E. Weatherby Stadium
September 6, 2002	Tuscola	0	Pisgah	28	Pisgah Memorial Stadium
August 29, 2003	Tuscola	27	Pisgah	0	C.E. Weatherby Stadium
September 3, 2004	Tuscola	28	Pisgah	16	Pisgah Memorial Stadium
September 2, 2005	Tuscola	3	Pisgah	14	C.E. Weatherby Stadium
September 2, 2006	Tuscola	10	Pisgah	56	Pisgah Memorial Stadium
August 31, 2007	Tuscola	22	Pisgah	6	C.E. Weatherby Stadium
September 5, 2008	Tuscola	28	Pisgah	10	Pisgah Memorial Stadium
October 16, 2009	Tuscola	41	Pisgah	10	C.E. Weatherby Stadium
October 15, 2010	Tuscola	14	Pisgah	17	Pisgah Memorial Stadium
October 7, 2011	Tuscola	28	Pisgah	27	C.E. Weatherby Stadium
October 5, 2012 (OT)	Tuscola	24	Pisgah	21	Pisgah Memorial Stadium
October 18, 2013	Tuscola	7	Pisgah	27	C.E. Weatherby Stadium
October 17, 2014	Tuscola	20	Pisgah	37	Pisgah Memorial Stadium
October 16, 2015 (OT)	Tuscola	17	Pisgah	20	C.E. Weatherby Stadium
October 14, 2016 (OT)	Tuscola	20	Pisgah	23	Pisgah Memorial Stadium
September 1, 2017	Tuscola	10	Pisgah	31	C.E. Weatherby Stadium
August 31, 2018	Tuscola	10	Pisgah	20	Pisgah Memorial Stadium
September 6, 2019	Tuscola	0	Pisgah	14	C.E. Weatherby Stadium
February 26, 2021*	Tuscola	14	Pisgah	44	Pisgah Memorial Stadium
October 15, 2021	Tuscola	20	Pisgah	21	C.E. Weatherby Stadium
October 14, 2022 (2OT)	Tuscola	35	Pisgah	34	C.E. Weatherby Stadium*
October 13, 2023	Tuscola	27	Pisgah	10	C.E. Weatherby Stadium
November 8, 2024*	Tuscola	7	Pisgah	10	Pisgah Memorial Stadium
October 10, 2025	Tuscola	14	Pisgah	35	C.E. Weatherby Stadium
October 9, 2026	Tuscola	21	Pisgah	0	Pisgah Memorial Stadium

- The 2020 edition of the game (originally scheduled for September 4) was delayed to February 26, 2021 due to the COVID-19 pandemic.
- The 2022 edition of the game was played at C.E. Weatherby Stadium due to flood damage at Pisgah Memorial Stadium caused by the remnants of Hurricane Fred. Pisgah remained the designated home team.
- The 2024 edition of the game (originally scheduled for October 11, 2024) was delayed to November 8, 2024 due to flood damage at Pisgah Memorial Stadium caused by the remnants of Hurricane Helene.

== Fan support ==
The Haywood County Championship game draws crowds of between 10,000 and 15,000 fans per year, filling both stadiums to capacity. Dedicated fans are known to arrive as early as 3:00 in the afternoon.

=== Vandalism ===
As is a part of many fierce rivalries, vandalism has also been a part of the Tuscola–Pisgah rivalry. Pisgah fans became notorious for spray painting the water tower and sidewalks on Tuscola hill, while Tuscola fans have bleached the grass and torn up the field at Pisgah. To counteract vandalism, security at the schools has been ramped up during rivalry week.
