= Western Mountain Athletic Conference (NCHSAA) =

- Classification: NCHSAA 3A
- No. of teams: 9
- Region: Western North Carolina

The Western Mountain Athletic Conference (WMAC) was a North Carolina High School Athletic Association 3A conference in the western region of North Carolina, in Buncombe, Henderson and Haywood Counties.

== Member schools ==
Institution	Location	Nickname
A.C. Reynolds High School	Asheville, NC (Fairview)	Rockets
Asheville High School	Asheville, NC	Cougars
Enka High School	Asheville, NC (Candler)	Jets
Clyde A. Erwin High School	Asheville, NC (Leicester)	Warriors
North Buncombe High School	Weaverville, NC	Black Hawks
North Henderson High School	Hendersonville, NC	Knights
T.C. Roberson High School	Asheville, NC (Skyland)	Rams
Tuscola High School	Waynesville, NC	Mountaineers
West Henderson High School	Hendersonville, NC	Falcons
