= Folkmoot USA =

International folk festival

- Date: 1984
- Venue: Hazelwood Elementary School
- Location: Western North Carolina
- Type: Festival
- Theme: International folk festival
- Website: www.folkmootusa.org

Folkmoot USA, The State International Festival of North Carolina, is an international folk festival held since 1984 in Waynesville, North Carolina and surrounding communities. During its history, the two-week event has featured around 8000 performers from approximately 200 countries. The Folkmoot USA non-profit organization has its headquarters in the former Hazelwood Elementary School. The name "Folkmoot", used for a festival in Newcastle upon Tyne, England, means "meeting of the people". The North Carolina General Assembly declared Folkmoot USA to be the state's official international folk festival in 2003. The Southeast Tourism Society has named Folkmoot USA one of its top twenty events for 20 years.

== History ==
Folkmoot USA began with a visit by Waynesville surgeon Dr. Clinton Border and a square dance team to a folk festival in Sidmouth, England in 1973. Western North Carolina had a history of preserving its traditional culture, so Border believed it would be a good location for an American folk festival. In 1984, Border presented a plan for a festival in North Carolina which would be similar to the one in England. One month later, a board of directors began work on the first Folkmoot USA. At one time, the name for the event was North Carolina International Folk Festival, Folkmoot USA.

The first event took place in 1984, coinciding with North Carolina's 400th birthday celebration, featuring performers from England, Germany, Holland, Ireland, Turkey, Mexico, Puerto Rico and India. Waynesville Middle School and other schools housed performers before Folkmoot USA had its own building.

In the 1990s, Hazelwood Elementary School, built in 1923 with later additions in 1939, 1955, 1958 and 1987, and located at 112 Virginia Avenue in the Hazelwood section of Waynesville, was replaced with a new, larger building. In 2002, the Folkmoot Friendship Center opened in the former school. When not used for the festival, the Hazelwood facility became a community center, with art work from the various countries in the hallways. The organization's mission of understanding other cultures continued the rest of the year. Other sections of the school building were used by Haywood County Alternative Learning Center and the Haywood County Schools Conference Center.

In 2014, with no other potential uses for the old Hazelwood School, the Haywood County school system chose to let Folkmoot have the aging school, which desperately needed repairs and upgrades, especially to its roof. The change would allow Folkmoot to have events year-round; for the more than ten years the organization leased the building, the uncertainty about its future location prevented Folkmoot from expanding its programs. Owning its building also meant Folkmoot would have to raise money for the building, which it could finally do as the owner. The gift was the largest ever to the organization, worth $1.3 million according to tax records.

As of 2019, over $1 million had been spent on improvements. Heating, cooling and electrical improvements were still needed which would cost $300,000 more, and funds were being raised through events such as Mountain Memories Hazelwood, a variety show about the area's history.

To help pay for the buildings, Folkmoot USA needed to find other uses. In 2019, Folkmoot USA agreed to let Academy at SOAR, a boarding school for children with learning disabilities started in 1977, move into the 40,000-square-foot 1923 building, a third of the Folkmoot Center, for ten months out of the year, with Folkmoot USA using the space the other two months. The building needed major upgrades. As of 2024, the academy had a sign outside another of the former school's buildings.

Year-round programs include Southern Storytellers Series, Cultural Crash Courses, Nashville Songwriters in the Round, live music performances and International Friendship Dinners. Western North Carolina Quilt Trail has moved to the Folkmoot Center, and artists' spaces are available.

As of 2024, with the festival getting shorter every year, Folkmoot USA succeeded in turning its buildings into a year-round arts center which paid for itself. No festival took place in 2025. The building was called Folkmoot Center for the Arts as of 2026.

=== Impact ===
One study estimated its contribution to the economy at $4 million. In 2003, Folkmoot USA had approximately 350 performers and 75,000 spectators from at least 40 states.

== Meaning of the name ==
In Anglo-Saxon England, a folkmoot or folkmote (Old English - a meeting of the people) was a governing general assembly consisting of all the free members of a tribe, community or district. It was the forerunner to the witenagemot, which was in turn in some respects the precursor of the modern Parliament.

The term has also been appropriated for modern-day annual meetings of organisations such as the Order of Woodcraft Chivalry.

== Performance locations ==
In addition to Canton, Clyde, Maggie Valley, Waynesville and Lake Junaluska in Haywood County, performances have taken place in Asheville at Asheville High School, Diana Wortham Theatre and Asheville's Jewish Community Center. Other locations include Franklin, Bryson City, Burnsville, Flat Rock, Cherokee, and Hickory.

== Selection of performers ==
Hundreds of groups apply to perform each year, with 10 to 12 selected. According to executive director Jackie Bolden, the festival offers different cultures each year, with each group performing dances or music of their particular culture, representing holidays, battles, or occupations. Countries not previously represented are prioritized in the selection process.

Folkmoot USA belongs to the International Council of Folklore Festival Organizations and Traditional Arts, or CIOFF, based in Paris. Most groups that perform for Folkmoot USA have some connection to CIOFF, and in case of a last-minute cancellation, CIOFF connections can find a replacement.

== Other festivals ==
Yocona International Folk Festival in northern Mississippi claims to have been inspired by Folkmoot USA. In 2007, Folkmoot USA executive director Jamye Cooper helped start the Yocona Festival.

== Countries represented ==
- 2007: Jamaica, Puerto Rico, Mexico, Italy, Greece, Peru, Russia, Romania, Macedonia, Korea
- 2009: Spain, Greece, Serbia, Kenya, Romania, Georgia, Israel, India, Mexico, Netherlands
- 2010: Russia, Latvia, France, Switzerland, Peru, Jordan, Portugal, Poland
- 2011: Burundi, Canada, Croatia, Finland, Guadeloupe, Italy, Trinidad and Tobago
- 2012: New Zealand, France, Serbia, Belgium, Puerto Rico, Philippines, Indonesia, Peru
- 2013: France, Martinique, Thailand, Japan, Slovakia, Mexico, Canada, Paraguay
- 2014: Romania, Russia, Taiwan, Turkey, Trinidad and Tobago, Colombia
- 2015: Bangladesh, Canada, Chile, Ecuador, Estonia, Philippines, Puerto Rico
- 2016: China, Dominican Republic, Finland, France, Ghana, Japan, Peru, Poland, Romania
- 2017: Argentina, Canada, India, Israel, The Netherlands, Russia, Slovenia, Taiwan
- 2018: Czech Republic, Ghana, Italy, Jamaica, Mexico, Northern Cyprus, Thailand, Venezuela
- 2019: Bahamas, China, Colombia, Egypt, Hungary, Nepal, Romania
