= Walters Dam =

Dam in North Carolina, US

Coordinates: 35°41′42″N 83°02′59″W

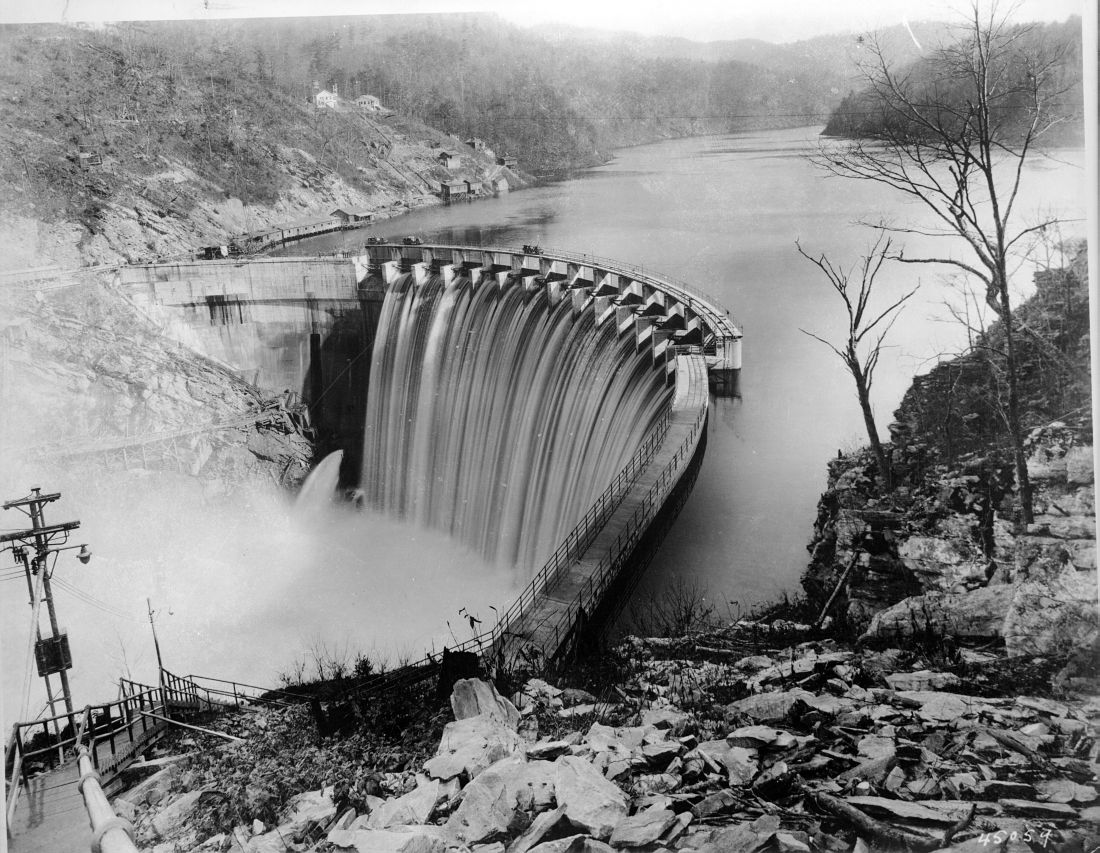
- The Walters Dam near Waterville, North Carolina in 1928. The powerhouse sits roughly 6.2 miles downstream at the confluence of the Pigeon River and Big Creek in Waterville.
- Interactive map of Walters Dam
- Country: United States
- Location: Haywood County, North Carolina
- Status: Operational
- Opening date: 1930
- Operator: Duke Energy

Reservoir
- Creates: Waterville Lake
- Normal elevation: 2,257 ft (688 m)

Walters Dam, also known locally as the Waterville Dam, is a hydroelectric dam in Haywood County of western North Carolina, in the Great Smoky Mountains.

The concrete arch dam is 180 ft (55 m) high by 800 ft (240 m) long, impounding the Pigeon River, near Interstate 40. The brick powerplant actually stands 6.2 miles (10.0 km) from the dam. A tunnel 6.2 miles (10.0 km) long stretches north from the dam to the power plant, near the state line.

Construction of the dam began in 1927 and was completed in 1930. The project was started by Carolina Power & Light and was completed by its affiliate Phoenix Electric Co. The Carolina Power and Light Company established the community of Waterville at the mountain's northern base, near the confluence of Big Creek and the Pigeon River. Waterville provided the labor force needed to operate the company's Walters Plant, which housed the powerhouse for the Waterville Lake reservoir further upstream.

It was designated as a North Carolina Historic Civil Engineering Landmark in 1980. As of 2024 the dam was owned and operated by Duke Energy as an active hydroelectric facility, with a rated capacity of 112 MW.

On September 27, 2024, during an episode of heavy rainfall and severe flooding caused by Hurricane Helene, the dam was reported by officials in neighbouring Cocke County to have "suffered a catastrophic failure". Evacuations were issued for downstream communities, including Newport, Tennessee. These reports were confirmed by Duke Energy to have been false.
