= Canton Middle School =

Canton Middle School may refer to one or more of the following:

- Canton Middle School - Haywood County, North Carolina
- Canton Middle School - Baltimore, Maryland
- Canton Middle School - Streamwood, Illinois
