= Western North Carolina Athletic Conference =

- Formerly: AAC
- Classification: NCHSAA 2A/3A
- Founded: 2009
- No. of teams: 8
- Region: Western North Carolina

The Western North Carolina Athletic Conference (WNCAC), was a North Carolina High School Athletic Association conference which operated in the western region of North Carolina since August 2009. Prior to January 2011, it was referred to as the Appalachian Athletic Conference. However, a name change was forced when the NCHSAA was hit by a copyright claim from the National Association of Intercollegiate Athletics (NAIA) which operates a collegiate conference using the same name. The conference consisted of five 3A schools and three 2A schools. In terms of playoffs, these schools competed in their respective NCHSAA classifications.

== Member schools ==
Institution	Location	Nickname	Classification
Brevard High School	Brevard, NC	Blue Devils	2A
East Henderson High School	East Flat Rock, NC	Eagles	3A
Franklin High School	Franklin, NC	Panthers	2A
North Henderson High School	Hendersonville, NC	Knights	3A
Pisgah High School	Canton, NC	Black Bears	3A
Smoky Mountain High School	Sylva, NC	Mustangs	2A
Tuscola High School	Waynesville, NC	Mountaineers	3A
West Henderson High School	Mills River, NC	Falcons	3A
