= Shook-Welch-Smathers House =

Historic house in North Carolina, United States

- U.S. National Register of Historic Places
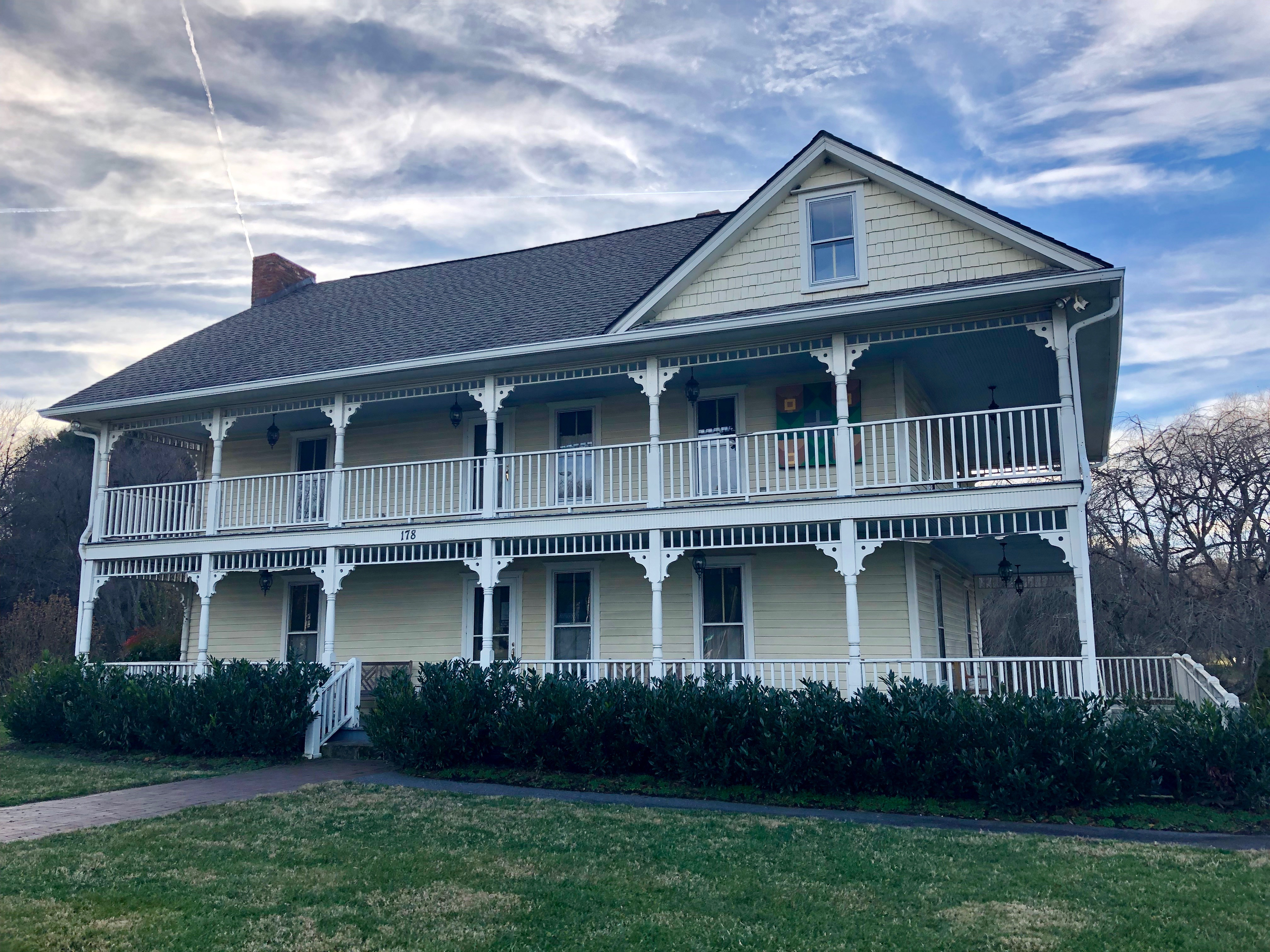
- Shook-Welch-Smathers House, January 2019

- Location within North Carolina Location within the United States
- Location: 178 Morgan St., Clyde, North Carolina
- Coordinates: 35°31′54″N 82°55′7″W
- Area: 2.9 acres (1.2 ha)
- Built: c. 1810-1820, c. 1840-1860, c. 1890-1900
- Architectural style: Georgian, Late Victorian
- NRHP reference No.: 08000891
- Added to NRHP: September 12, 2008

Shook-Welch-Smathers House is a historic home located at Clyde, Haywood County, North Carolina. It was built over three principal periods of construction in the 19th century: c. 1810–1820; c. 1840–1860; and c. 1890–1900. It is a two-story, frame dwelling sheathed in weatherboard and exhibits Georgian and Late Victorian style design elements. It features a full-facade double-tier porch.

It was listed on the National Register of Historic Places in 2008. It is the oldest frame house west of the Eastern Continental Divide.

The house is home to the Shook Museum, operated by the Haywood County Historical and Genealogical Society.
