= Pigeon River (Tennessee–North Carolina) =

U.S. river

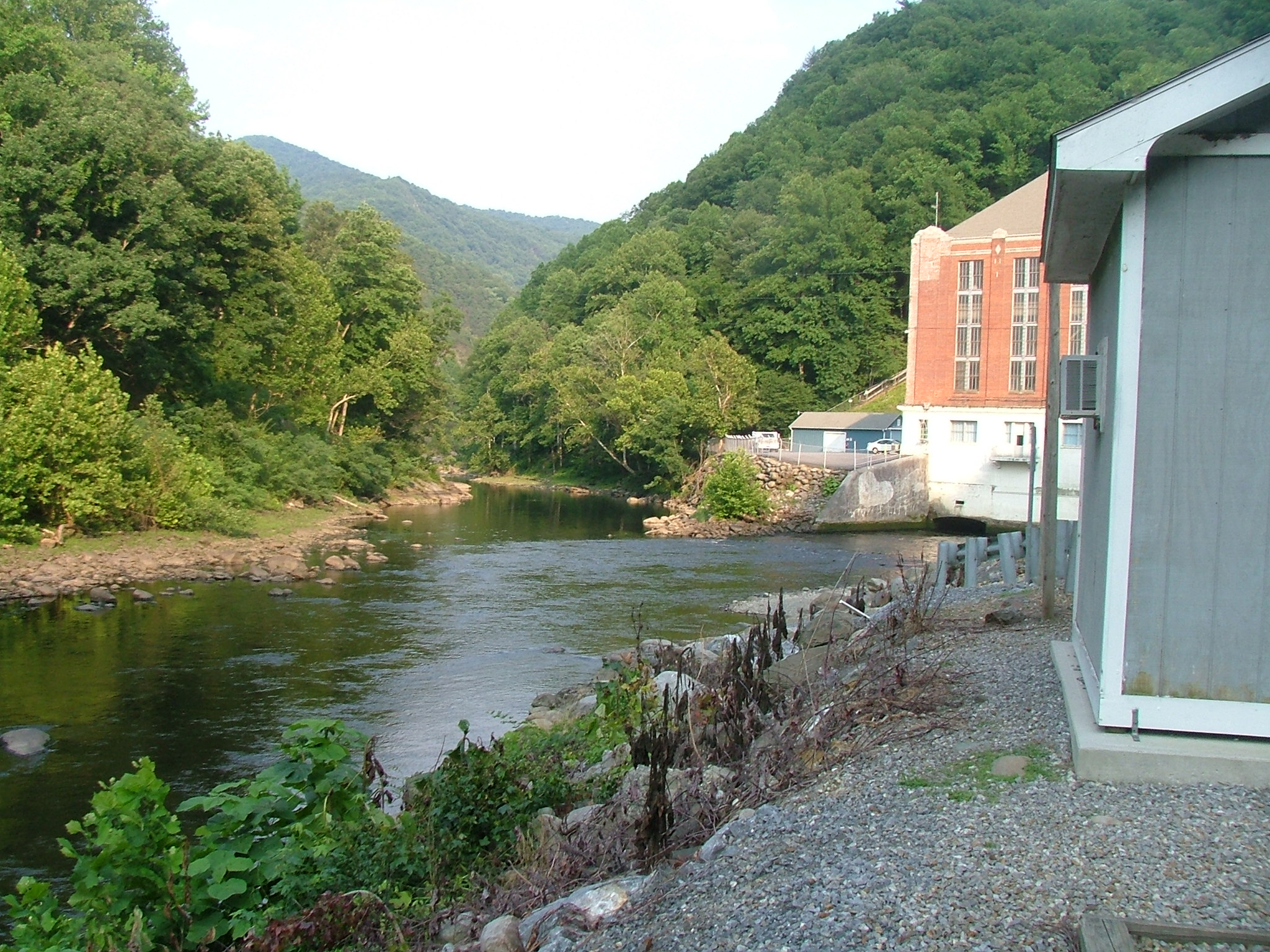
- The confluence of the Pigeon River and Big Creek in Waterville, North Carolina. The power plant is in the background.

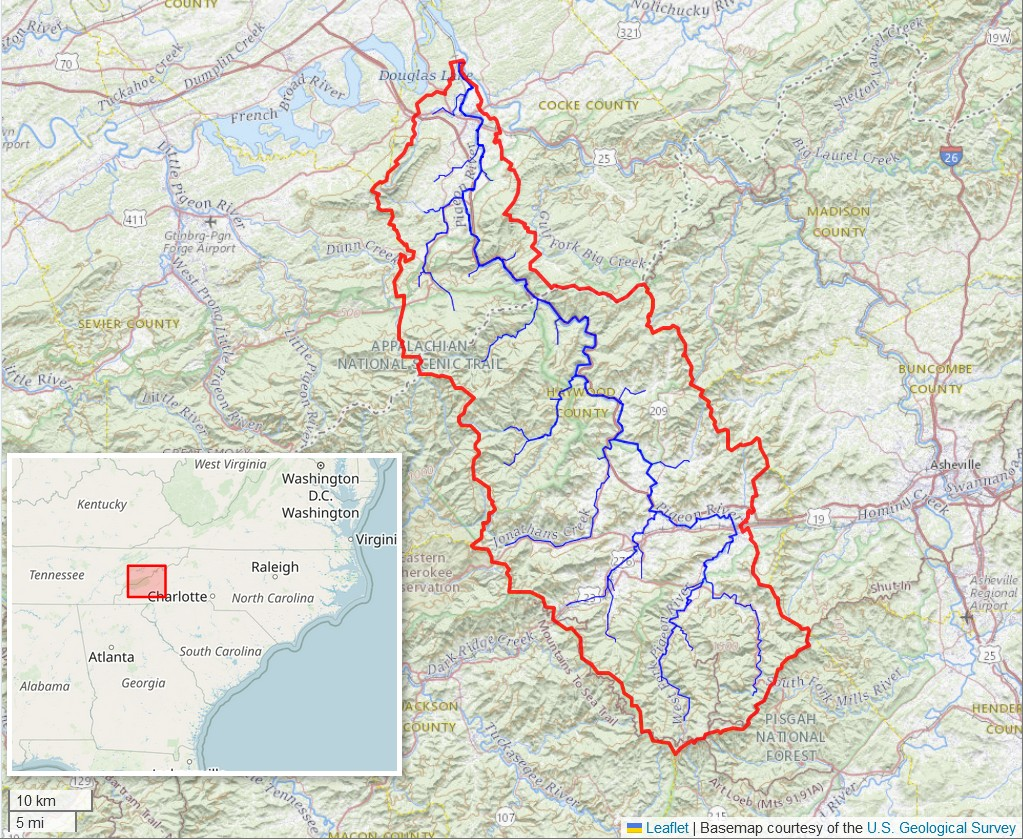
- Pigeon River watershed (Interactive map)

Location
- Country: United States
- State: North Carolina, Tennessee

Physical characteristics
- Source: West Fork Pigeon River
  - location: below Mount Hardy in Haywood County, North Carolina
  - coordinates: 35°18′11″N 82°55′05″W
  - elevation: 5,320 ft (1,620 m)
- 2nd source: East Fork Pigeon River
  - location: below South Spring Top in Haywood County, North Carolina
  - coordinates: 35°19′37″N 82°49′47″W
  - elevation: 4,190 ft (1,280 m)
- Source confluence
  - location: south of Canton, North Carolina
  - coordinates: 35°28′43″N 82°52′55″W
  - elevation: 2,644 ft (806 m)
- Mouth: French Broad River
  - location: Irish Bottoms in Cocke County, Tennessee
  - coordinates: 36°01′28″N 83°11′47″W
  - elevation: 1,001 ft (305 m)
- Length: 70 mi (110 km)
- Basin size: 704 sq mi (1,820 km^{2})
- Discharge
  - location: Newport, Tennessee, 6.8 miles (10.9 km) above the mouth(mean for water years 1945–1983)
  - average: 1,256 cu ft/s (35.6 m^{3}/s)(mean for water years 1945–1983)
  - minimum: 38 cu ft/s (1.1 m^{3}/s)October 1952
  - maximum: 50,000 cu ft/s (1,400 m^{3}/s)February 1902

The Pigeon River of Western North Carolina and East Tennessee rises above Canton, North Carolina, is impounded by Walters Dam, enters Tennessee, and flows into the French Broad River, just past Newport, Tennessee. The river traverses the Pisgah National Forest and the Cherokee National Forest, and drains much of the northeastern Great Smoky Mountains National Park.

The river takes its name from the passenger pigeon, an extinct bird whose migration route once included the river valley in North Carolina.

== Course ==
The Pigeon River arises in southeastern Haywood County, North Carolina, and flows basically northwest for most of its length. However, near Pressley Mountain it turns northeast for about four miles and in the town of Canton, where it was utilized by a now-closed local paper mill, it turns north. After Canton it turns almost due west for about five miles, before resuming its northwest trend at about Clyde. From Canton, the Pigeon River flows roughly parallel to Interstate 40 for many miles. It is impounded by the Walters Dam of Progress Energy creating the long, narrow Waterville Lake. It enters Tennessee just after the village of Waterville, and continues with I-40 in the same valley northwestward through Hartford to Newport, where I-40 heads west, and the Pigeon River flows north into the French Broad River.

== History ==
The Pigeon River dam was started in 1927 (99 years ago) and was completed in 1930 (96 years ago). The project was started by Carolina Power & Light and was completed by its affiliate Phoenix Electric Co. The concrete dam is 180 ft (55 m) high by 800 ft long. The brick power plant (visible from I-40) is actually 6.2 miles (10.0 km) from the dam. A tunnel 6.2 miles (10.0 km) long stretches from the dam to the power plant.

The floods following the series of storms spawned by Hurricanes Frances and Ivan in September 2004 have changed the character of the river, with additional damage in 2024 from Hurricane Helene. The rains lasted days and flooding was severe. Portions of the towns of Canton and Clyde were completely underwater, and there was significant damage to a large portion of both towns. Farther upstream the water levels reached unprecedented levels. Part of Interstate 40 collapsed into the river gorge because of the force of the floodwaters. This began when trees on the hill beside the highway fell in the river, followed by the soil the trees had held in place. The shoulder gave way, and a guardrail ended up just hanging.

A large paper mill (once part of Champion International Paper and now the Blue Ridge Paper Company) in Canton was the primary source of considerable dioxin and particulate matter pollution discharged into the Pigeon River. The pollution situation in the river became a minor issue in the campaign for the 1988 Presidential election. As Al Gore started his first run for the Presidency, Newsweek magazine reported that Gore was pressured by North Carolina Senator Terry Sanford and Congressman Jamie Clarke to ease up on his campaign against Champion's wastewater discharges into the Pigeon River. According to Newsweek, Gore complied with their request, writing to the United States Environmental Protection Agency to oppose tighter water pollution control requirements. This issue came up again during the 2000 Presidential election.

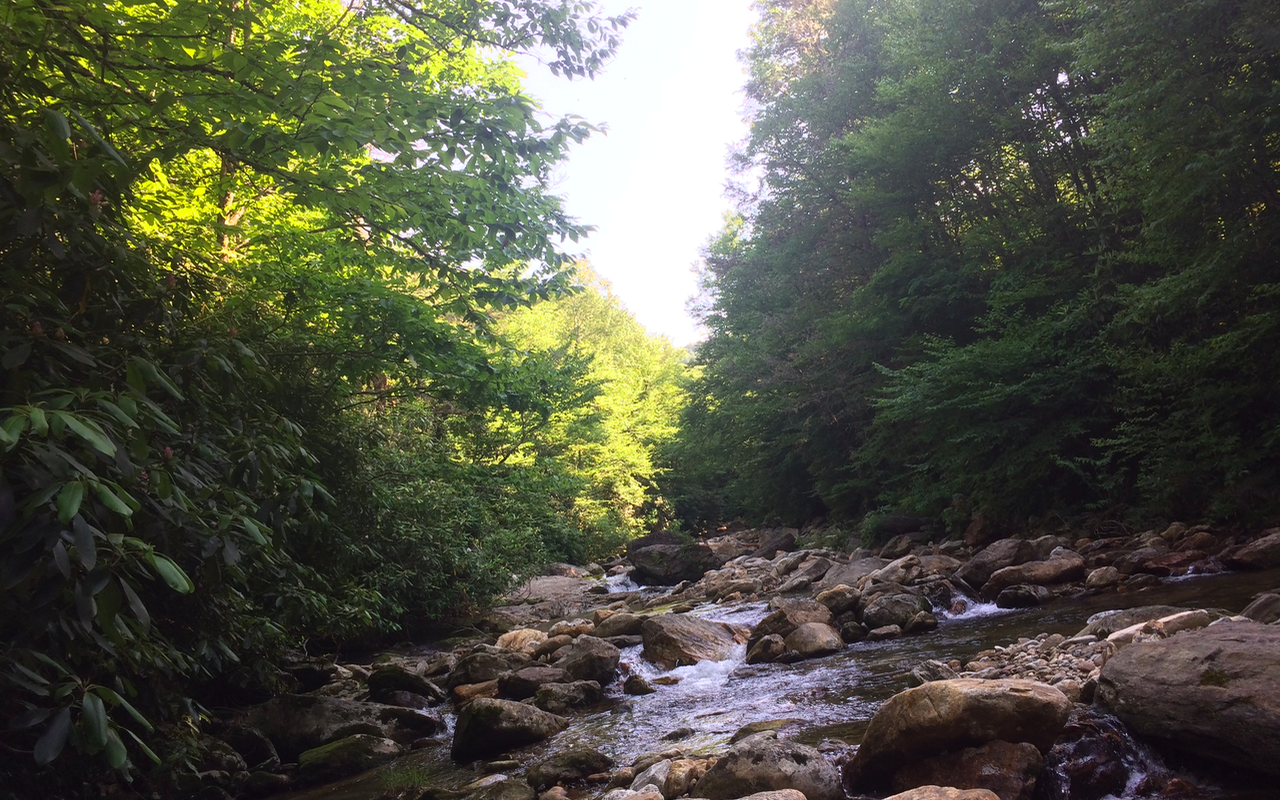
East Fork of the Pigeon River

== Recreation ==
Recreational rafting is popular in two sections of the river, the Upper and the Lower. Both sections are found in Hartford, Tennessee. The Upper section begins at the powerhouse (located right on the North Carolina/Tennessee border) and features up to Class III+ whitewater rapids. The Lower section features "more modest" waves.

== See also ==
- List of rivers of Tennessee
