= Haywood County Schools (North Carolina) =

School district in North Carolina, United States

Location
- Haywood County, North Carolina United States

District information
- Type: Public
- Grades: PK–12
- Superintendent: Trevor Putnam
- Schools: 16
- Budget: $ 75,736,000
- NCES District ID: 3702040

Students and staff
- Students: 7,813
- Teachers: 546.24 (on FTE basis)
- Staff: 526.14 (on FTE basis)
- Student–teacher ratio: 14.30:1

Other information
- Website: www.haywood.k12.nc.us

Haywood County Schools is a PK–12 graded school district serving Haywood County, North Carolina. Its 16 schools serve 7,813 students as of the 2010–11 school year.

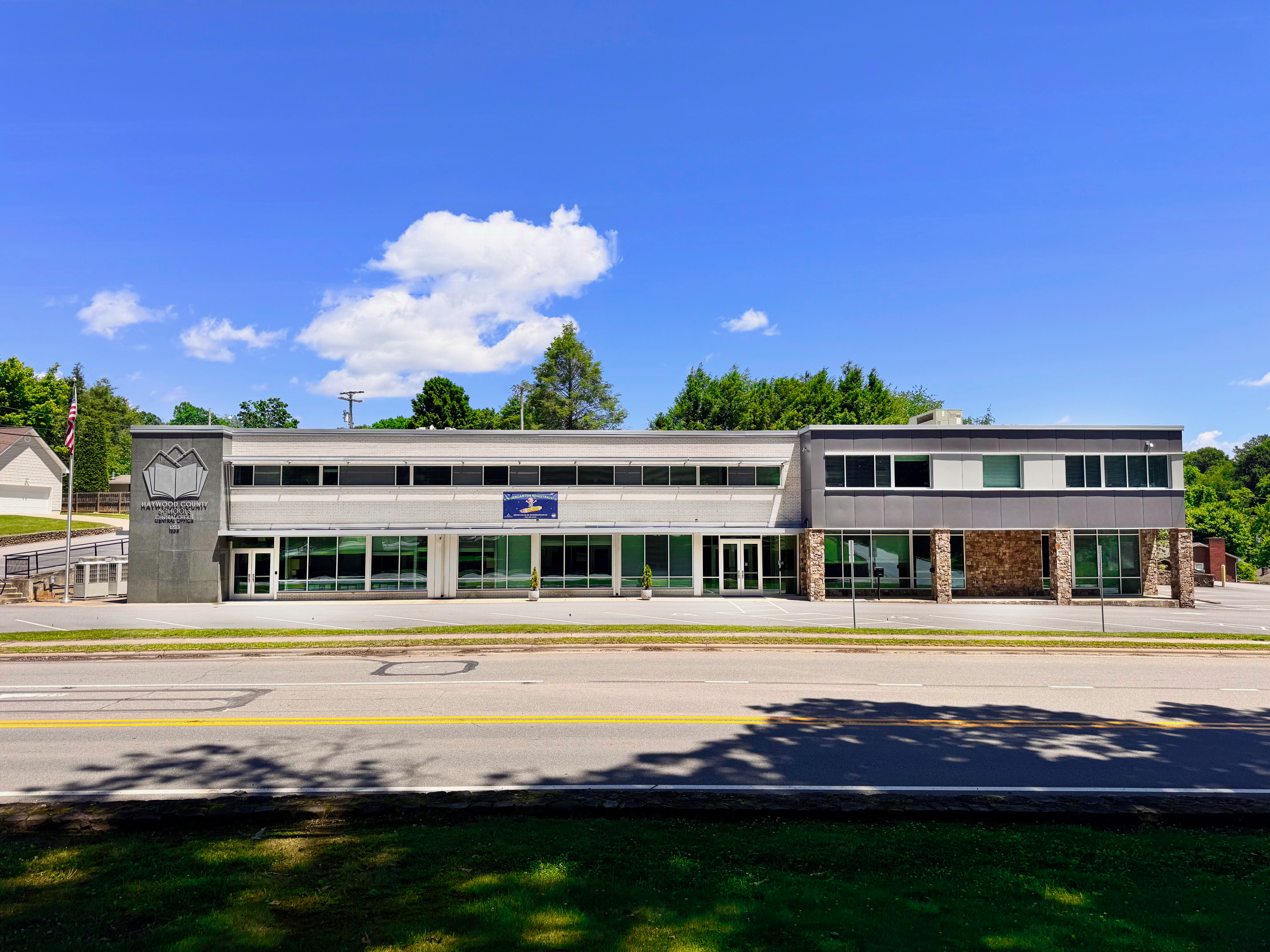
Central office for Haywood County Schools in Waynesville

== Student demographics ==
For the 2010–11 school year, Haywood County Schools had a total population of 7,813 students and 546.24 teachers on a (FTE) basis. This produced a student-teacher ratio of 14.30:1. That same year, out of the total student population, the gender ratio was 52% male to 48% female. The demographic group makeup was: White, 90%; Hispanic, 6%; Black, 1%; American Indian, 1%; and Asian/Pacific Islander, 0% (two or more races: 2%). For the same school year, 54.15% of the students received free and reduced-cost lunches.

== Governance ==
The primary governing body of Haywood County Schools follows a council–manager government format with a nine-member Board of Education appointing a Superintendent to run the day-to-day operations of the system. The school system currently resides in the North Carolina State Board of Education's Eighth District.

=== Board of education ===
The nine members of the Board of Education generally meet on the second Monday of each month. The current members of the board are: Chuck Francis (Chair), Larry Harbin (Vice Chair), Jimmy Rodgers, Lynn Milner, Steven Kirkpatrick, Bob Morris, Rhonda Schandevel, Larry Henson, and Jim Harley Francis. Chuck Francis also served as president of the North Carolina School Boards Association for 2011–12.

=== Superintendent ===
Superintendent Dr. Trevor Putnam has been in charge of the Haywood County school district since November 1, 2022. The former superintendent of the system is Dr. Bill Nolte. He replaced Dr. Anne Garrett after her retirement on March 1, 2018.

== Member schools ==
Haywood County Schools has 16 schools ranging from pre-kindergarten to twelfth grade. Those are separated into four high schools, three middle schools, and nine elementary schools.

=== High schools ===
- Central Haywood High School; alternative school, grades 9–12 (Clyde)
- Haywood Early College High School (Clyde)
- Pisgah High School (Canton)
- Tuscola High School (Waynesville)

=== Middle schools ===
- Bethel Middle School (Bethel)
- Canton Middle School (Canton)
- Haywood Innovative Middle (The Lion)
- Waynesville Middle School (Waynesville)

=== Elementary schools ===
- Bethel Elementary School (Bethel)
- Clyde Elementary School (Clyde)
- Hazelwood Elementary School (Waynesville)
- Jonathan Valley Elementary School (Waynesville)
- Junaluska Elementary School (Waynesville)
- Meadowbrook Elementary School (Canton)
- North Canton Elementary School (Canton)
- Riverbend Elementary School (Clyde)

== Athletics ==
Athletic departments for the district schools are members of the North Carolina High School Athletic Association. They compete in various sports in the Western North Carolina Athletic Conference. Pisgah is a 3A school and Tuscola classified as 3A. Haywood Early College and Central Haywood do not have athletic teams.

== Awards ==
The Haywood County Schools system has had two schools listed as Blue Ribbon Schools: Riverbend Elementary School in 2011 and 2017. Haywood Early College was listed as a Blue Ribbon School in 2018. The system also has had two teachers recognized as North Carolina Department of Public Instruction Teacher of the Year: Merv Sessoms in 1988–89 and Heather Smith in 2024.

== See also ==
- List of school districts in North Carolina
