= Haywood County, North Carolina =

County in North Carolina, United States

- County
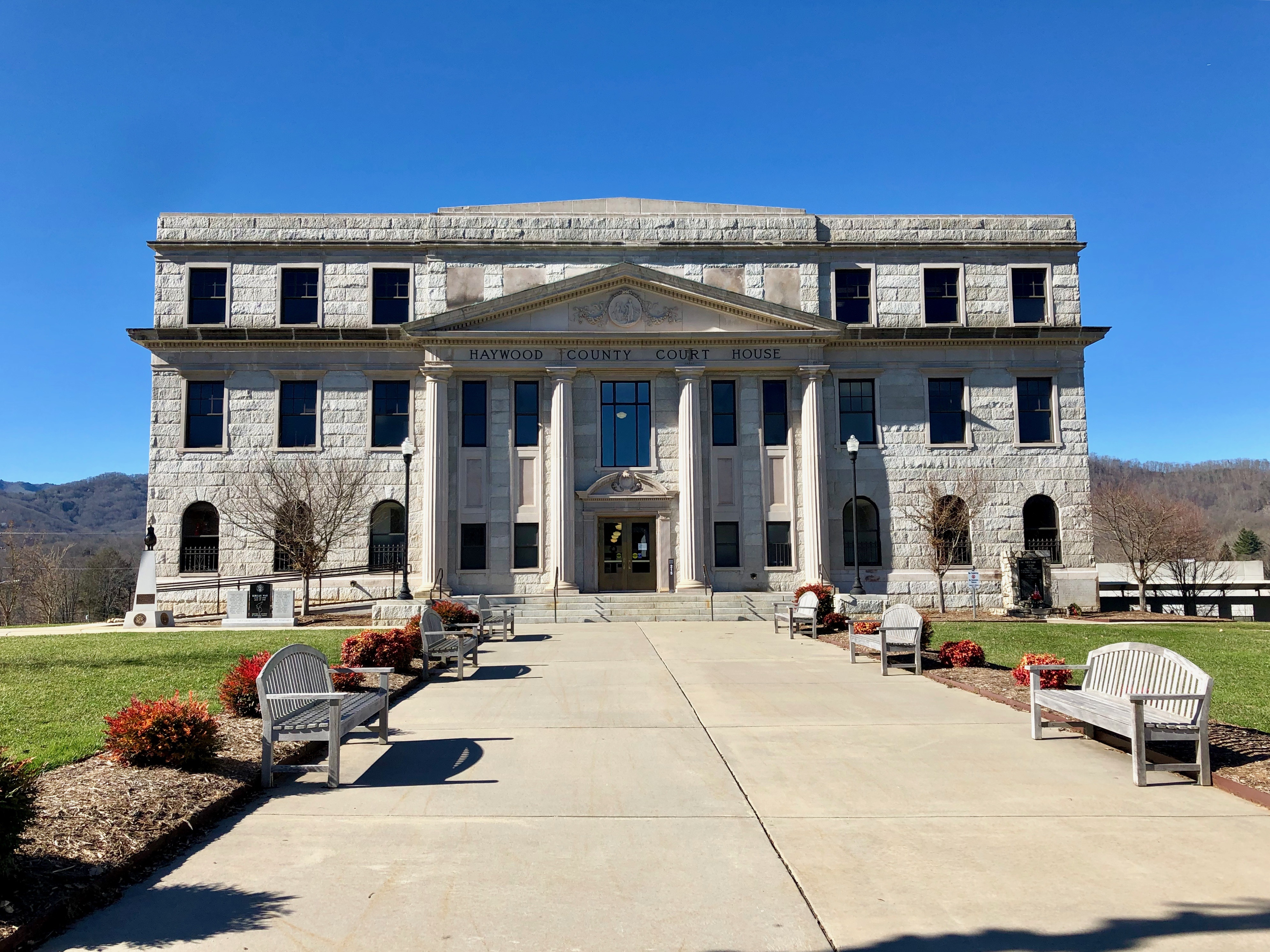
- Haywood County Courthouse

- Seal

- Location within the U.S. state of North Carolina
- Interactive map of Haywood County, North Carolina
- Coordinates: 35.56°N 82.98°W
- Country: United States
- State: North Carolina
- Founded: 1808
- Named for: John Haywood
- Seat: Waynesville
- Largest community: Waynesville

Area
  - Total: 554.50 sq mi (1,436.1 km^{2})
  - Land: 553.56 sq mi (1,433.7 km^{2})
  - Water: 0.94 sq mi (2.4 km^{2}) 0.17%

Population (2020)
  - Total: 62,089
  - Estimate (2025): 63,369 ▲
  - Density: 112.16/sq mi (43.31/km^{2})
- Time zone: UTC−5 (Eastern)
  - Summer (DST): UTC−4 (EDT)
- Congressional district: 11th
- Website: www.haywoodcountync.gov

Haywood County is a county located in the U.S. state of North Carolina. As of the 2020 census, the population was 62,089. The county seat and its largest community is Waynesville.

Haywood County is part of the Waynesville, NC Micropolitan Statistical Area.

== History ==
The earliest inhabitants of the area eventually comprising Haywood County were Cherokee Native Americans. Their local population was severely impacted by a smallpox outbreak in 1715. In July 1776, during the early stages of the American Revolutionary War, Cherokee warriors began attacking white settlements in western North Carolina. In response, a militia led by General Griffith Rutherford led an expedition through the region and destroyed dozens of Cherokee villages. White settlement increased after the war, with most of the settlers being of English, Scotch-Irish, German, and Dutch descent. The county was formed in 1808 from the western part of Buncombe County. It was named for John Haywood, who served as the North Carolina State Treasurer from 1787 to 1827. The county seat was designated at Mount Pleasant, which was renamed Waynesville in 1811. The first county courthouse was completed the following year. In 1828, a part of Haywood County was split off and made Macon County. In 1851, parts of Haywood and Macon counties were combined to form Jackson County.

The last shot of the Civil War east of the Mississippi was fired in Waynesville on May 9, 1865, when elements of the Thomas Legion (Confederate) skirmished with the 2nd North Carolina Mounted Infantry (Union). In the 1880s, the Western North Carolina Railroad extended lines through the county, creating new economic industries centered on logging and tourism.

== Geography ==
According to the U.S. Census Bureau, the county has a total area of 554.5 square miles (1,436 km^{2}), of which 553.56 square miles (1,433.7 km^{2}) is land and 0.94 square miles (2.4 km^{2}) (0.17%) is water. It is bordered by Madison, Buncombe, Henderson, Transylvania, Jackson, Swain counties in North Carolina, and Cocke and Sevier counties in Tennessee.

Haywood County lies within the French Broad River basin. Since the county's borders follow mountain ridgelines, all water in the county derives from rain fallen over it or from local springs, with no external watercourses crossing its boundaries. The Pigeon River originates in Haywood County.

Haywood County is situated amidst the Blue Ridge Mountains and contains parts of several major subranges of the Blue Ridge, namely the Great Smoky Mountains in the west and the Plott Balsams and Great Balsam Mountains in the south. Notable peaks in the county include Cold Mountain, at 6,030 feet (1,840 m), Mount Sterling, at 5,835 feet (1,779 m), and Richland Balsam, at 6,410 feet (1,950 m) in elevation. Mt. Guyot, the county's highest point at 6,621 feet (2,018 m), is the 4th highest mountain east of the Mississippi River. Black Balsam Knob, in the Great Balsam Mountains in the southeastern section of the county, is the highest grassy bald in the entire Appalachian range. Haywood County is believed to be the highest county (by mean elevation) east of the Mississippi River, with a mean elevation of 3,597 feet or 1,096 metres. About 40 percent of the county's land lies within the Great Smoky Mountains National Park and the Pisgah National Forest.

=== National protected areas ===
- Blue Ridge Parkway (part)
- Middle Prong Wilderness
- Mount Pisgah (part)
- Nantahala National Forest (part)
- Pisgah National Forest (part)
- Shining Rock Wilderness
- Waterrock Knob (part)

=== State and local protected areas ===
- Cold Mountain Game Land
- Harmon Den Wildlife Management Area (part)
- Nantahala National Forest Game Land (part)
- Pisgah National Forest Game Land (part)
- Pisgah View State Park (part)
- William H. Silver Game Land (part)

=== Major water bodies ===
- Bald Creek
- Big Creek
- Cataloochee Creek
- Cooks Creek
- Cove Creek
- Crabtree Creek
- Jonathans Creek
- Fines Creek
- Lake Junaluska
- Lake Logan
- Laurel Creek
- Little Creek
- Pigeon River
- Richland Creek
- Rocky Branch Lake
- Waterville Lake

== Demographics ==
Historical population
Census	Pop.	Note	%±
1810	2,780		—
1820	4,073		46.5%
1830	4,578		12.4%
1840	4,975		8.7%
1850	7,074		42.2%
1860	5,801		−18.0%
1870	7,921		36.5%
1880	10,271		29.7%
1890	13,346		29.9%
1900	16,222		21.5%
1910	21,020		29.6%
1920	23,496		11.8%
1930	28,273		20.3%
1940	34,804		23.1%
1950	37,631		8.1%
1960	39,711		5.5%
1970	41,710		5.0%
1980	46,495		11.5%
1990	46,942		1.0%
2000	54,033		15.1%
2010	59,036		9.3%
2020	62,089		5.2%
2025 (est.)	63,369	▲	2.1%
U.S. Decennial Census; 1790–1960 1900–1990; 1990–2000 2010 2020

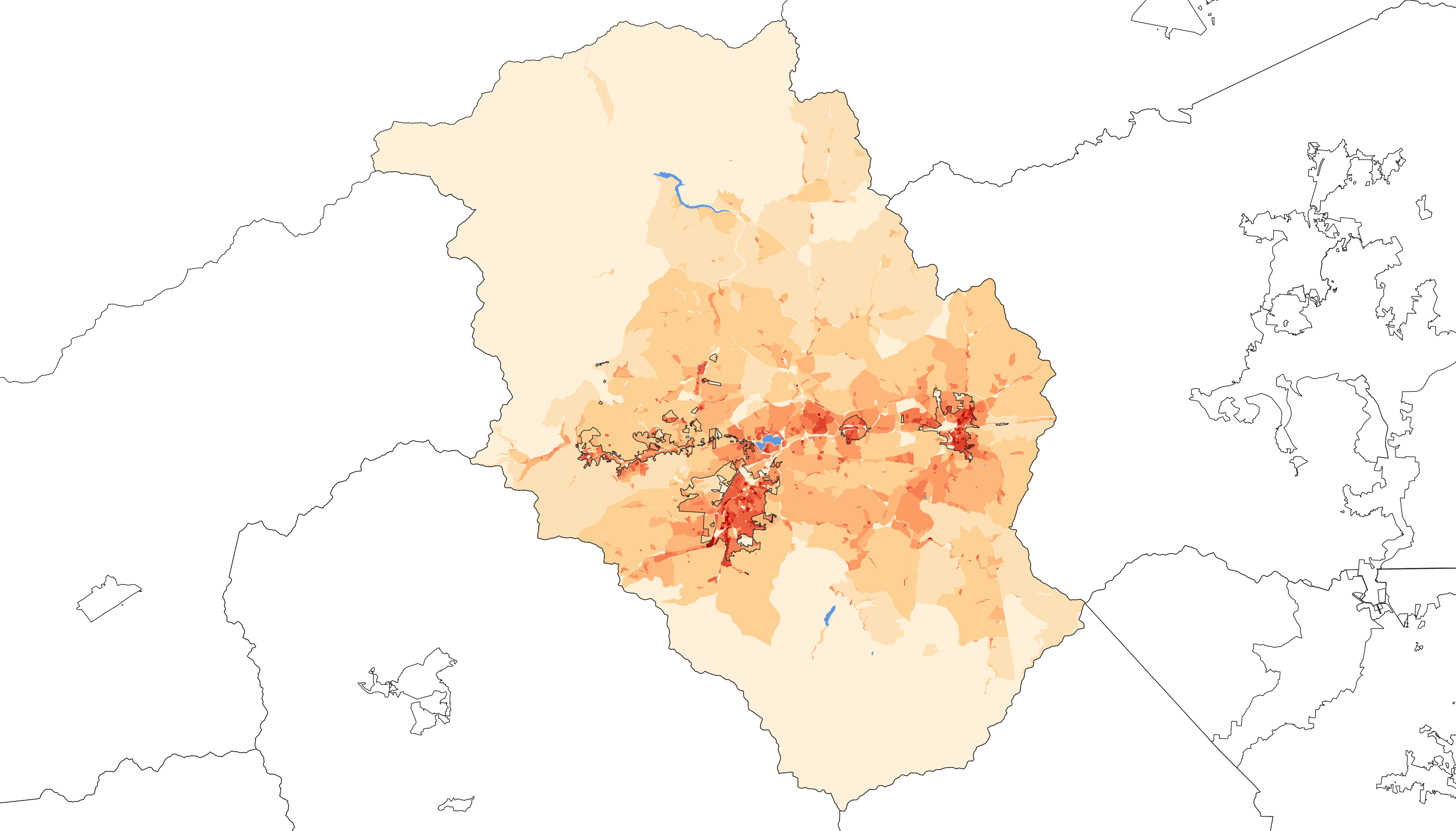
2020 population density of Haywood County NC by census block

=== 2020 census ===
As of the 2020 census, there were 62,089 people, 27,193 households, and 17,170 families residing in the county.

The median age was 48.8 years, 17.7% of residents were under the age of 18, and 26.2% of residents were 65 years of age or older. For every 100 females there were 93.5 males, and for every 100 females age 18 and over there were 90.6 males.

The racial makeup of the county was 90.9% White, 1.1% Black or African American, 0.6% American Indian and Alaska Native, 0.6% Asian, <0.1% Native Hawaiian and Pacific Islander, 2.0% from some other race, and 4.9% from two or more races. Hispanic or Latino residents of any race comprised 4.6% of the population.

53.1% of residents lived in urban areas, while 46.9% lived in rural areas.

Of the county's 27,193 households, 23.1% had children under the age of 18 living in them. Of all households, 48.9% were married-couple households, 17.3% were households with a male householder and no spouse or partner present, and 27.3% were households with a female householder and no spouse or partner present. About 30.0% of all households were made up of individuals and 15.5% had someone living alone who was 65 years of age or older.

There were 34,889 housing units, of which 22.1% were vacant. Among occupied housing units, 74.9% were owner-occupied and 25.1% were renter-occupied. The homeowner vacancy rate was 2.1% and the rental vacancy rate was 10.6%.

=== Racial and ethnic composition ===
Haywood County, North Carolina – Racial and ethnic composition Note: the US Census treats Hispanic/Latino as an ethnic category. This table excludes Latinos from the racial categories and assigns them to a separate category. Hispanics/Latinos may be of any race.
Race / Ethnicity (NH = Non-Hispanic)	Pop 1980	Pop 1990	Pop 2000	Pop 2010	Pop 2020	% 1980	% 1990	% 2000	% 2010	% 2020
White alone (NH)	45,330	45,815	51,870	55,368	55,685	97.49%	97.60%	96.00%	93.79%	89.69%
Black or African American alone (NH)	742	647	674	615	656	1.60%	1.38%	1.25%	1.04%	1.06%
Native American or Alaska Native alone (NH)	122	176	251	270	308	0.26%	0.37%	0.46%	0.46%	0.50%
Asian alone (NH)	40	62	113	212	360	0.09%	0.13%	0.21%	0.36%	0.58%
Native Hawaiian or Pacific Islander alone (NH)	x	x	17	8	1	x	x	0.03%	0.01%	0.00%
Other race alone (NH)	25	2	17	30	156	0.05%	0.00%	0.03%	0.05%	0.25%
Mixed race or Multiracial (NH)	x	x	328	534	2,094	x	x	0.61%	0.90%	3.37%
Hispanic or Latino (any race)	236	240	763	1,999	2,829	0.51%	0.51%	1.41%	3.39%	4.56%
Total	46,495	46,942	54,033	59,036	62,089	100.00%	100.00%	100.00%	100.00%	100.00%

=== 2000 census ===
At the 2000 census, there were 54,033 people, 23,100 households, and 16,054 families residing in the county. The population density was 98 people per square mile (38 people/km^{2}). There were 28,640 housing units at an average density of 52 units per square mile (20 units/km^{2}). The racial makeup of the county was 96.85% White, 1.27% Black or African American, 0.49% Native American, 0.21% Asian, 0.04% Pacific Islander, 0.44% from other races, and 0.71% from two or more races. 1.41% of the population were Hispanic or Latino of any race. 30.8% were of American, 12.9% English, 12.0% German, 10.4% Irish and 8.3% Scots-Irish ancestry according to Census 2000. 97.1% spoke English and 1.9% Spanish as their first language.

There were 23,100 households, out of which 26.20% had children under the age of 18 living with them, 56.70% were married couples living together, 9.50% had a female householder with no husband present, and 30.50% were non-families. 26.70% of all households were made up of individuals, and 12.30% had someone living alone who was 65 years of age or older. The average household size was 2.30 and the average family size was 2.76.

In the county, the population was spread out, with 20.80% under the age of 18, 6.20% from 18 to 24, 26.90% from 25 to 44, 27.10% from 45 to 64, and 19.00% who were 65 years of age or older. The median age was 42 years. For every 100 females there were 92.00 males. For every 100 females age 18 and over, there were 88.70 males.

The median income for a household in the county was $33,922, and the median income for a family was $40,438. Males had a median income of $30,731 versus $21,750 for females. The per capita income for the county was $18,554. About 8.10% of families and 11.50% of the population were below the poverty line, including 17.40% of those under age 18 and 10.30% of those age 65 or over.

== Government, law, and public safety ==
=== Government ===
Haywood County is governed by an elected five-member board of commissioners. Each member is popularly-elected to serve a four-year term. The board is responsible for adopting the county budget, setting the local property tax rate, making zoning decisions, and hiring the county attorney and county manager. The county manager oversees county government administration.

Haywood County is a member of the regional Southwestern Commission council of governments. It is located in the North Carolina Senate's 47th district, the Senate's 50th district, the North Carolina House of Representatives' 118th district, and North Carolina's 11th congressional district.

Haywood County contains a small portion of the Qualla Boundary, a tribal reservation for the Eastern Band of Cherokee Indians.

=== Public safety ===
The Haywood County Sheriff's Office provides court protection and jail management for the entire county and provides patrol and detective services for the unincorporated portions of the county. The towns of Waynesville, Canton, and Maggie Valley have municipal police departments. On October 1, 2020, the Haywood County Sheriff's Office took over all law enforcement service for the town of Clyde. They are expected to continue operations in the town until June 2025.

Fire protection and rescue services are provided by the Clyde, Cruso, North Canton, Saunook, Waynesville, Crabtree-Ironduff, Maggie Valley, Junaluska, Center Pigeon, Canton, Jonathan Creek, Fines Creek, and Lake Logan-Cecil Fire Departments.

=== Politics ===
United States presidential election results for Haywood County, North Carolina
Year	Republican		Democratic		Third party(ies)	
Year	No.	%	No.	%	No.	%
1912	354	10.76%	2,068	62.88%	867	26.36%
1916	1,523	38.79%	2,403	61.21%	0	0.00%
1920	3,000	41.50%	4,229	58.50%	0	0.00%
1924	2,440	34.71%	4,582	65.18%	8	0.11%
1928	4,472	51.73%	4,173	48.27%	0	0.00%
1932	3,082	31.11%	6,790	68.54%	34	0.34%
1936	3,331	28.95%	8,175	71.05%	0	0.00%
1940	2,357	21.45%	8,631	78.55%	0	0.00%
1944	2,919	27.35%	7,755	72.65%	0	0.00%
1948	2,684	26.14%	7,373	71.82%	209	2.04%
1952	6,124	41.14%	8,761	58.86%	0	0.00%
1956	6,955	47.79%	7,598	52.21%	0	0.00%
1960	8,583	51.62%	8,044	48.38%	0	0.00%
1964	5,575	34.33%	10,664	65.67%	0	0.00%
1968	6,205	39.26%	5,703	36.08%	3,898	24.66%
1972	8,903	64.84%	4,515	32.88%	313	2.28%
1976	5,885	35.35%	10,692	64.22%	71	0.43%
1980	7,217	41.33%	9,814	56.20%	431	2.47%
1984	10,146	55.96%	7,958	43.89%	27	0.15%
1988	8,957	49.68%	9,010	49.98%	61	0.34%
1992	7,292	34.71%	10,385	49.43%	3,332	15.86%
1996	7,995	39.84%	9,350	46.59%	2,724	13.57%
2000	12,118	54.41%	9,793	43.97%	362	1.63%
2004	14,545	56.09%	11,237	43.33%	150	0.58%
2008	14,910	53.12%	12,730	45.36%	427	1.52%
2012	15,633	55.88%	11,833	42.30%	508	1.82%
2016	18,929	61.60%	10,473	34.08%	1,325	4.31%
2020	22,834	62.49%	13,144	35.97%	564	1.54%
2024	23,393	61.80%	13,913	36.76%	545	1.44%

Voter Registration Statistics: Republicans=17,459 Democrats=10,804

Prior to the Civil War, Haywood County elected several Whigs to office. After the war ended in 1865, Unionists established a local branch of the Republican Party. Republicans dominated local offices until 1870, when the Democratic Party—often as a member of fusionist anti-Reconstruction "Conservative" coalitions alongside former Whigs as well as Moderate Republicans and independents opposed to Reconstruction—experienced a resurgence across the state. By 1876, the county was firmly dominated by Democrats. Democrats remained dominant in the county into the early 21st century. Over the subsequent 20 years, the Republican Party's presence rapidly increased due to the increase of new residents and the defection of local Southern Democrats. In November 2022, Republicans won all contested local races in Haywood, making the county commission entirely occupied by Republicans for the first time in its history.

== Economy ==
Pactiv Evergreen was the largest employer in Haywood County. It operated a large paper mill in Canton and another facility in Waynesville. In March 2023, the company announced it would close the Canton mill by the end of June. The closure resulted in the loss of hundreds of jobs and $500 million in overall economic impact, and as of 2023, Haywood County Schools was expected to become the largest employer.

== Transportation ==
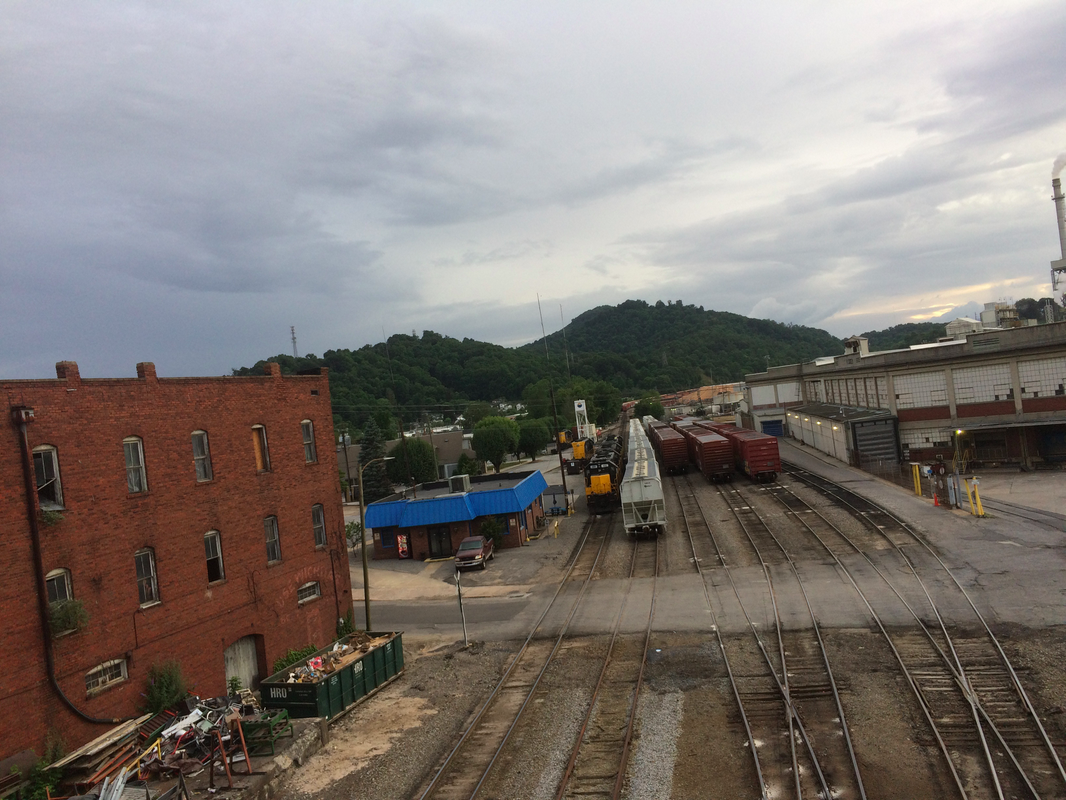
Rail line in Canton

The Blue Ridge Southern Railroad operates a rail line with freight service through Haywood County.

=== Major highways ===
- I-40
- US 19
- US 19 Truck
- US 23
- US 23 Bus.
- US 64 Truck
- US 74
- US 276
- NC 110
- NC 209
- NC 215
- Blue Ridge Parkway

== Education ==
Haywood County Schools operates 15 schools: an early college (Haywood Early College High School), three high schools (Tuscola, Pisgah, and Central Haywood), three middle schools, and eight elementary schools. The districts has no low-performing schools and had the seventh highest combined test results among school districts in the state in 2021–22. The county also hosts Haywood Community College. According to the 2021 American Community Survey, an estimated 27.7 percent of county residents have attained a bachelor's degree or higher level of education.

== Culture ==
=== Tuscola–Pisgah rivalry ===
Two county high schools' football teams, the Tuscola High School Mountaineers of Waynesville and Pisgah High School Black Bears of Canton, have maintained a rivalry dating back to the school teams' predecessors' first game in 1922. Annual football games between the two teams are popular events for locals and sometimes attract over 10,000 spectators.

=== Festivals ===
Since the 1930s, Haywood County has hosted an annual ramp (Allium tricoccum) convention.

Folkmoot USA is an international folk festival held since 1984 in Waynesville, North Carolina and surrounding communities. During its history, the two-week event has featured around 200 groups from approximately 100 countries. The Southeast Tourism Society has named Folkmoot USA one of its top twenty events for 20 years. The North Carolina General Assembly declared Folkmoot USA to be the state's official international folk festival in 2003.

== Communities ==
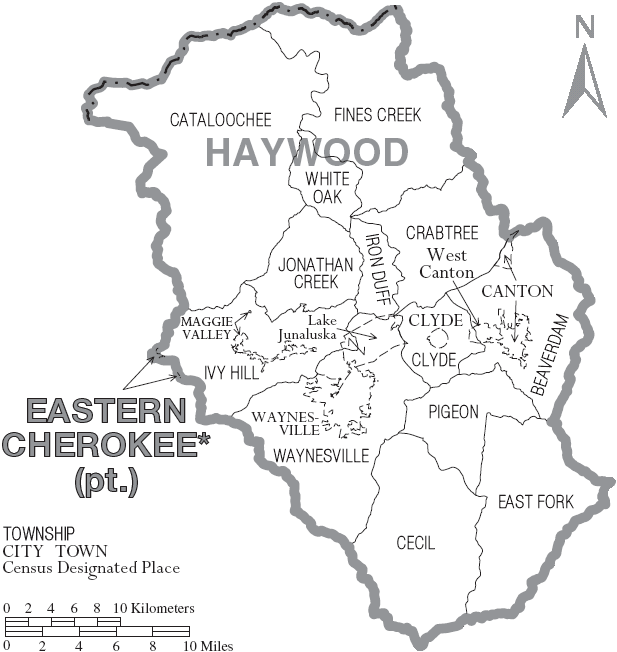
Map of Haywood County with municipal and township labels

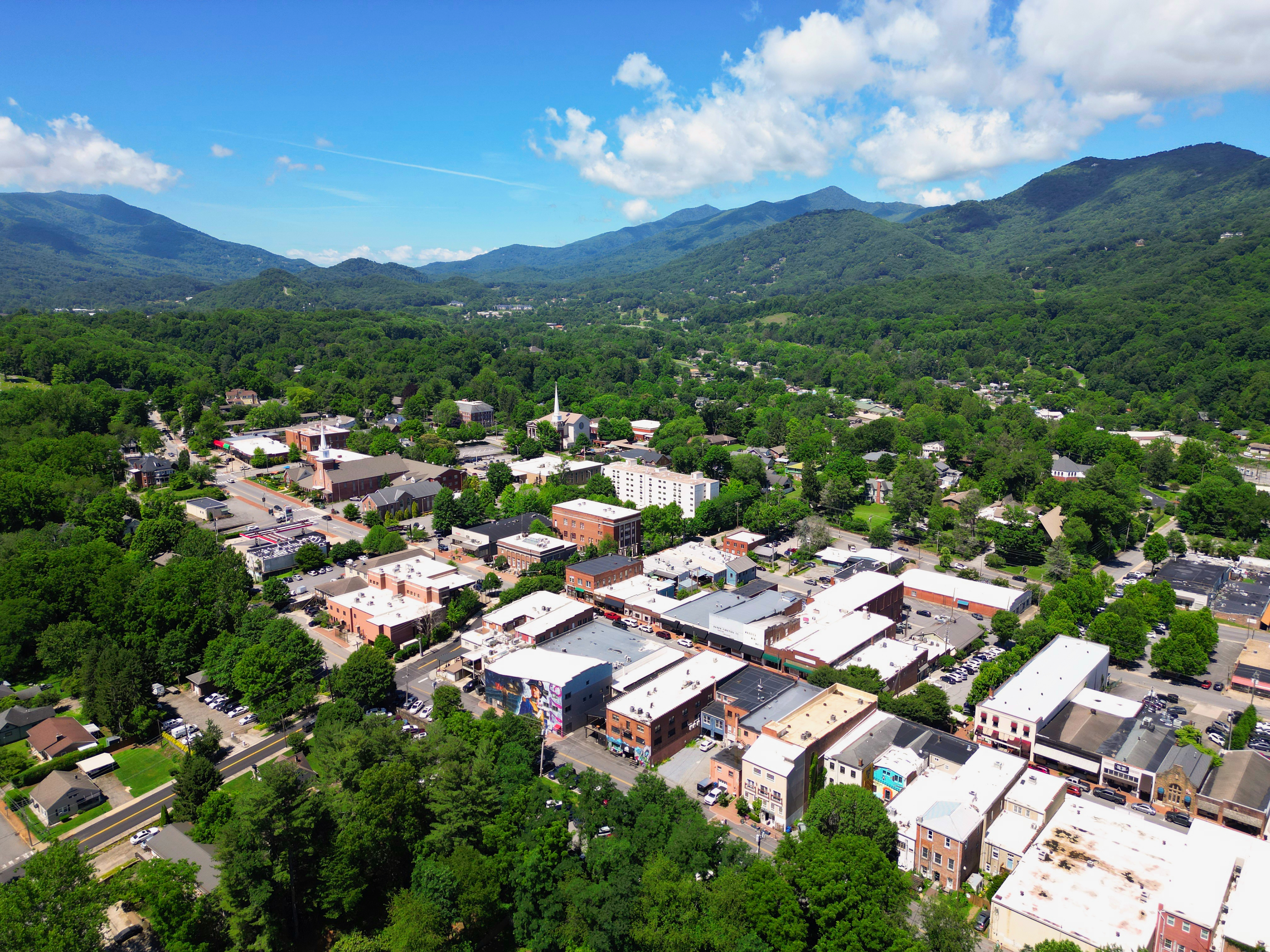
Downtown Waynesville

=== Towns ===
- Waynesville (county seat and largest community)
- Canton
- Clyde
- Maggie Valley

=== Census-designated places ===
- Lake Junaluska
- West Canton

=== Unincorporated communities ===
- Cruso
- Saunook

=== Townships ===
Haywood County townships include:

- Beaverdam
- Cataloochee
- Cecil
- Clyde
- Crabtree
- East Fork
- Fines Creek
- Iron Duff
- Ivy Hill
- Jonathan Creek
- Pigeon
- Suttontown
- Waynesville
- White Oak

== See also ==
- List of counties in North Carolina
- National Register of Historic Places listings in Haywood County, North Carolina
- Great Smoky Mountains Expressway

== Works cited ==
- Beadle, Michael; Yurko, Peter (2010). Waynesville. Arcadia Publishing. ISBN 9780738586236.
- Corbitt, David Leroy (2000). The formation of the North Carolina counties, 1663-1943 (reprint ed.). Raleigh: North Carolina Division of Archives and History. OCLC 46398241.
- Powell, William S. (1976). The North Carolina Gazetteer: A Dictionary of Tar Heel Places. Chapel Hill: The University of North Carolina Press. ISBN 9780807812471.
