= Jonathan Crompton =

American gridiron football player and coach (born 1987)

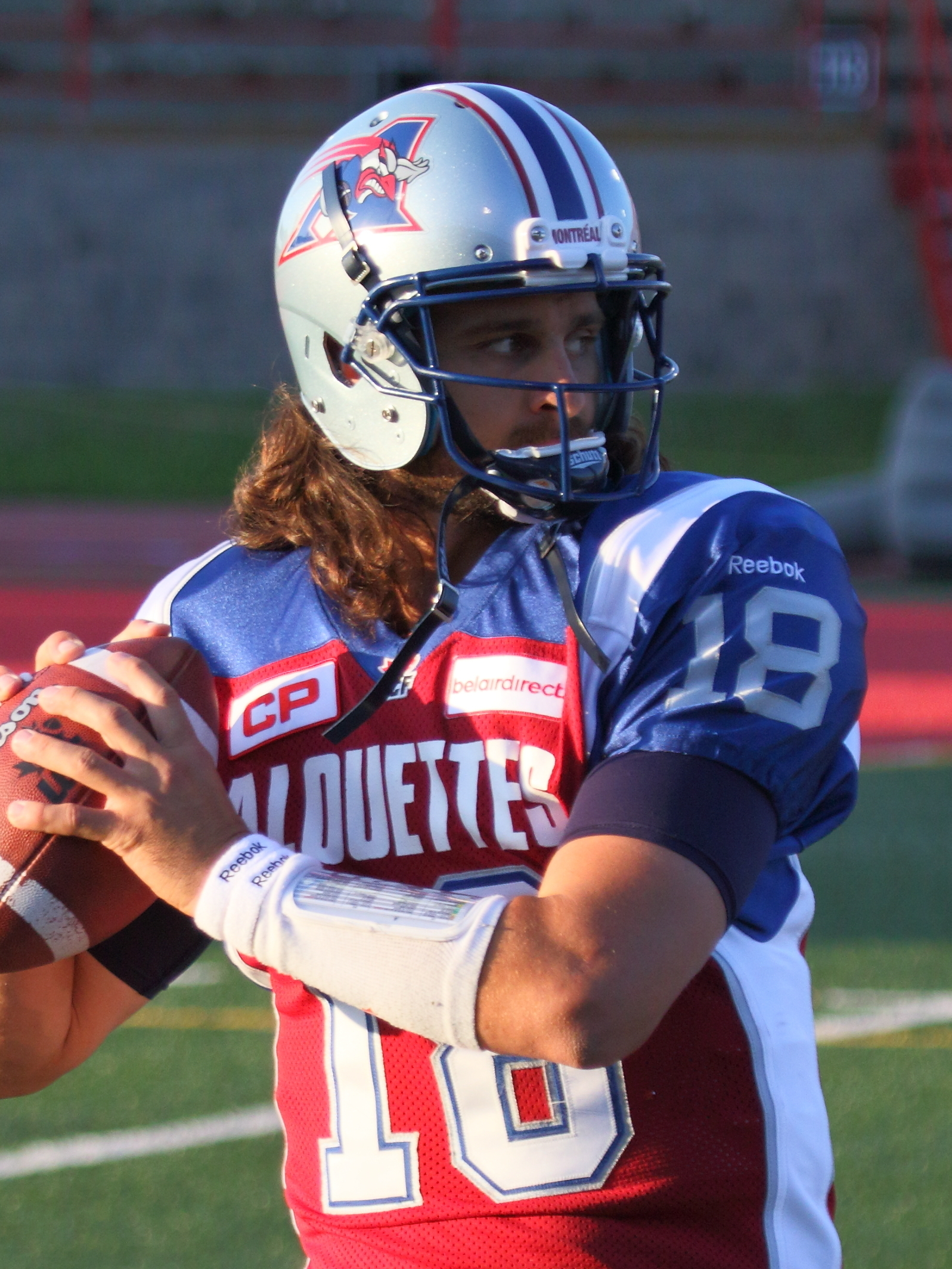
- Crompton with the Montreal Alouettes in 2015

No. 8, 7, 3, 14, 18
- Position: Quarterback

Personal information
- Born: July 25, 1987 (age 39); Asheville, North Carolina, U.S.
- Listed height: 6 ft 3 in (1.91 m)
- Listed weight: 222 lb (101 kg)

Career information
- High school: Tuscola (Waynesville, North Carolina)
- College: Tennessee (2005–2009)
- NFL draft: 2010: 5th round, 168th overall pick

Career history

Playing
- San Diego Chargers (2010)*; New England Patriots (2010–2011)*; Tampa Bay Buccaneers (2011)*; Washington Redskins (2011–2012)*; Edmonton Eskimos (2013–2014); Montreal Alouettes (2014–2016)
- * Offseason or practice squad member only

Coaching
- Toronto Argonauts (2019) Assistant offensive coordinator; Bishop's (2022) Offensive coordinator & quarterbacks coach; Tuscola HS (NC) (2023–present) Head coach
- Stats at Pro Football Reference
- Stats at CFL.ca (archive)

Jonathan David Crompton (born July 25, 1987) is an American former professional football player who was a quarterback in the National Football League (NFL) and Canadian Football League (CFL). He played college football for the Tennessee Volunteers. After being selected by the San Diego Chargers in the fifth round of the 2010 NFL draft. Crompton was briefly a member of the NFL's New England Patriots, Tampa Bay Buccaneers, and Washington Redskins. In addition, he played for the Edmonton Eskimos and Montreal Alouettes of the CFL. On March 27, 2023, he was named head coach of his former high school Tuscola in Waynesville, North Carolina.

== Early life ==
Crompton was raised in Asheville, North Carolina, and played two seasons of football at Clyde A. Erwin High School in Asheville. Before his junior season, Crompton moved to Waynesville, North Carolina in 2003 to finish his high school career at Tuscola High School. He was a Parade All-American in his senior season for the Tuscola Mountaineers. In 2003 and 2004, he was the named to the 3A All-State, All-Western and All-Mountain Athletic Teams, as well as being two-time player of the year. In 2004, he threw for 2,423 yards and 24 touchdowns on his way to an invite to the U.S. Army All-American Bowl, where his performance earned him the "Army of One" award.

Crompton was a five-star recruit by Scout.com and the third ranked quarterback in the class of 2005 behind Mark Sanchez and Ryan Perrilloux.

== College career ==
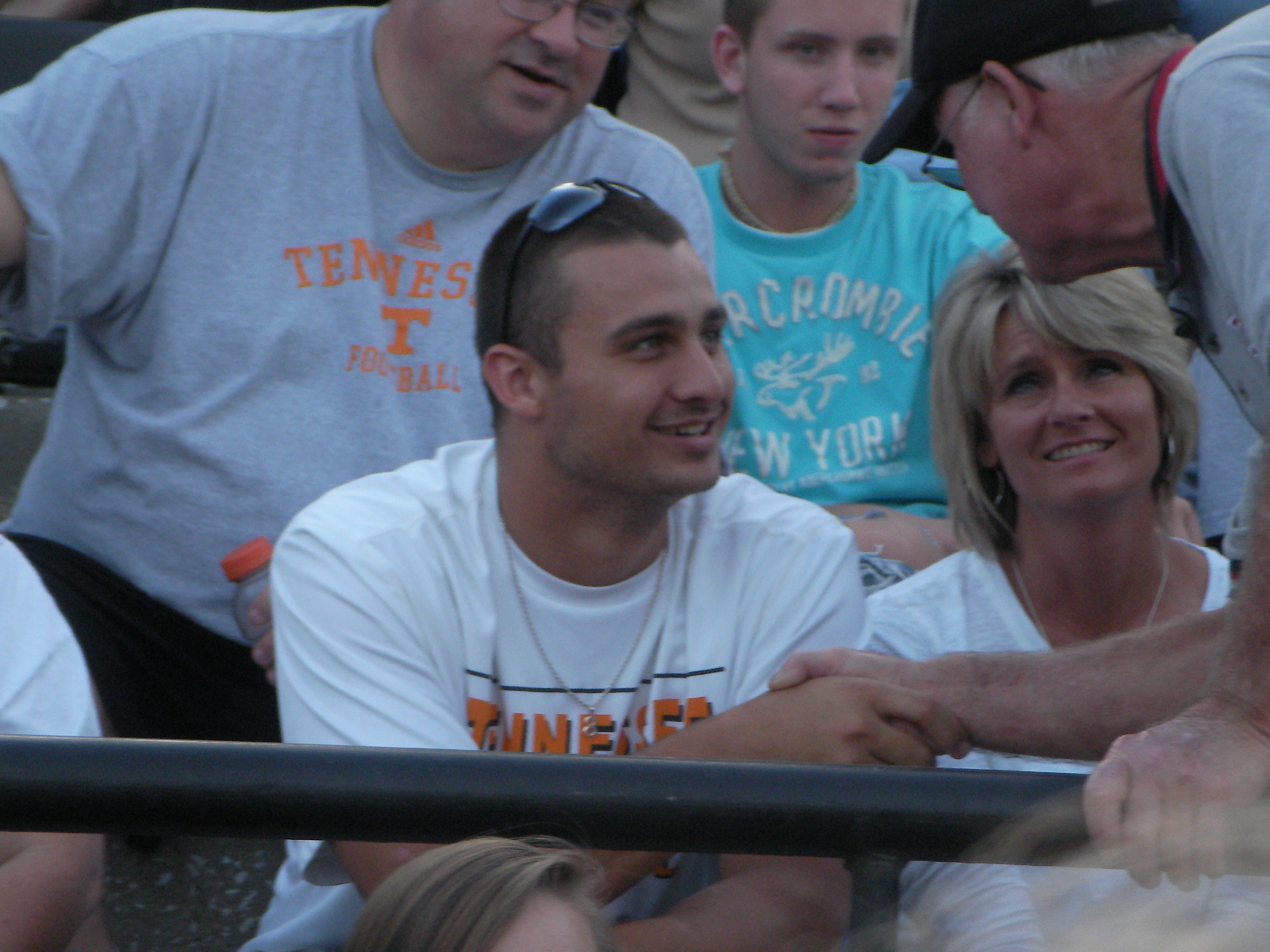
Crompton attends his alma mater Tuscola High School's 2008 rivalry game against Pisgah with his family

=== 2005 season ===
In 2005, Crompton enrolled at the University of Tennessee to play college football under head coach Phillip Fulmer. He redshirted his freshman year.

=== 2006 season ===
In 2006, Crompton saw little action until an injury to starting quarterback Erik Ainge led to his first significant playing time against #13 LSU. Replacing Ainge in the second quarter, he threw for 183 yards, two touchdowns, and an interception in the Volunteers' 28–24 loss at Neyland Stadium. The following week was Crompton's first-ever collegiate start against Arkansas at Donald W. Reynolds Razorback Stadium. Croptom would go 16-of-34 for 174 yards, two touchdowns, and one interception as the Volunteers lost 31–14. Ainge's return against Vanderbilt meant limited playing time for Crompton. Crompton finished the season 31-of-66 passing with four touchdowns and two interceptions.

=== 2007 season ===
As a sophomore in 2007, Crompton saw action as a reserve in seven games. He threw his lone touchdown of the season, a 49-yard pass to wide receiver Kenny O'Neal, in a 59–7 home victory over Louisiana-Lafayette. He finished the season 7-of-12 passing for 98 yards, two interceptions, and one touchdown.

=== 2008 season ===
In 2008, Crompton started the first four and the final two games of the season in the midst of what would be head coach Phillip Fulmer's last season with the Volunteers. He was the starter in wins over Alabama-Birmingham, Kentucky, and Vanderbilt; however, his erratic play within the offensive scheme of newly hired offensive coordinator Dave Clawson contributed to a poor season for Tennessee, where they went 5–6 and missed a bowl game, and the subsequent firing of Fulmer. He finished the season 86-of-167 passing (51.5%) with five interceptions and four touchdowns.

=== 2009 season ===
When Lane Kiffin was hired as head coach of the Volunteers, he named Crompton the starting quarterback prior to the 2009 season. In Kiffin's first game as the Volunteers' head coach, Crompton had a great outing with 233 passing yards, five touchdowns, and two interceptions in the 63–7 home victory over the Western Kentucky Hilltoppers. Crompton led Tennessee to an upset 45–19 home rout of the Georgia Bulldogs and was named the AT&T National Player of the Week. In a game at Bryant–Denny Stadium in Tuscaloosa, Alabama, against undefeated, top-ranked, and eventual national champion Alabama, Crompton's passing had Tennessee in position for a game-winning field goal in the final seconds, only to see the kick blocked by Terrence Cody as the Crimson Tide escaped with a 12–10 win. Crompton won five of his last seven starts in the regular season before the Vols lost 37–14 to Virginia Tech in the Chick-fil-a Bowl. Crompton finished the season with 2,800 passing yards, 27 touchdown passes, 13 interceptions, and a 58.3% completion percentage.

== Professional career ==
Pre-draft measurables
Height	Weight	40-yard dash	10-yard split	20-yard split	20-yard shuttle	Three-cone drill	Vertical jump	Broad jump
6 ft 3 1/8 in (1.91 m)	222 lb (101 kg)	4.85 s	1.70 s	2.79 s	4.34 s	6.95 s	31 in (0.79 m)	8 ft 10 in (2.69 m)
All values from Tennessee Pro Day

=== San Diego Chargers ===
Crompton was selected by the San Diego Chargers in the fifth round with the 168th overall pick of the 2010 NFL draft. He was waived during final cuts on September 4, 2010, was re-signed to the Chargers' practice squad the next day, but was released on September 7, 2010.

=== New England Patriots ===
The New England Patriots signed Crompton to their practice squad on November 2, 2010. On January 18, 2011, the Patriots re-signed Crompton to a future contract for the 2011 season. On August 1, he was waived by the team.

=== Tampa Bay Buccaneers ===
On August 5, 2011, Crompton signed with the Tampa Bay Buccaneers. He was cut on September 3, 2011.

=== Washington Redskins ===
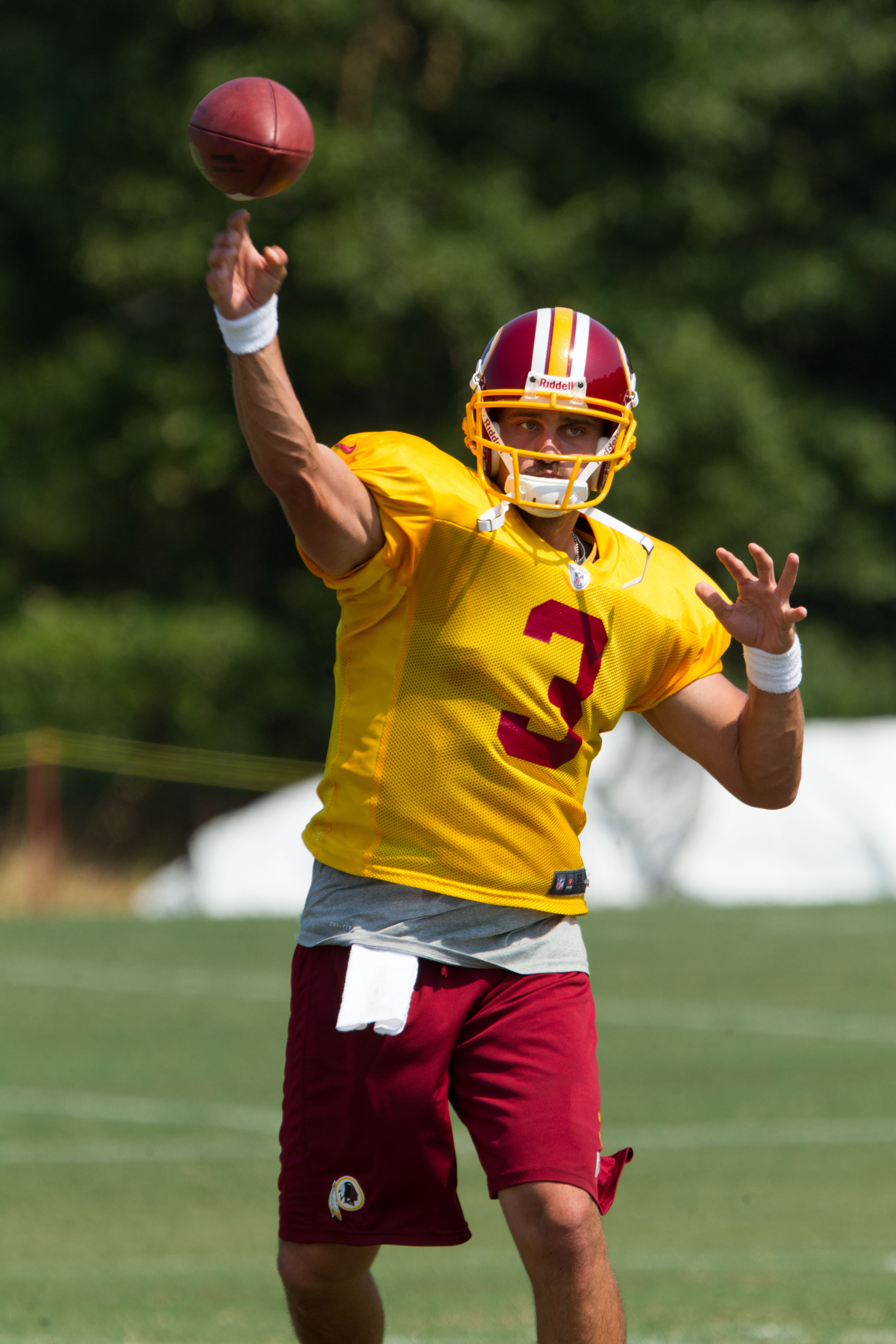
Crompton at Washington Redskins training camp in 2012.

The Washington Redskins signed Crompton to their practice squad on September 4, 2011.

On January 3, 2012, Crompton signed a futures contract with the Redskins. On August 27, he was released by the team. Two days later, Crompton was re-signed by the Redskins. Crompton was released again on August 31, 2012, for final cuts before the start of the 2012 season.

=== Edmonton Eskimos ===
On May 14, 2013, Crompton signed with the Edmonton Eskimos of the Canadian Football League. Crompton made appearances in seven games during the 2013 CFL season for the Eskimos; only receiving significant playing time in one of those seven games. On July 9, 2014, Crompton was released by Edmonton.

=== Montreal Alouettes ===
Crompton signed with the Montreal Alouettes on July 15, 2014. On August 22, 2014, he played his first game for the Alouettes in relief of Alex Brink, completing 18 for 29 passes for 266 yards in a 24–16 loss to the Winnipeg Blue Bombers. Despite the loss, Crompton received praise for his strong play. Crompton started the remaining 11 regular-season games and led the Alouettes from a 1–7 start to a record of 9–9 and a playoff berth. During the 2014 CFL season, Crompton completed 179 passes on 308 attempts (58.1% accuracy), for 2,482 yards, with 11 touchdowns and eight interceptions (passer rating of 85.2). Crompton led the Alouettes to a dominant 50–17 Eastern Semi-final victory over the BC Lions, but was unable to overcome the divisional champion Hamilton Tiger-Cats in the Eastern Final.

Crompton entered the Alouettes 2015 CFL Training Camp as the starting quarterback. Crompton had a rough start to the 2015 CFL season: On opening night, he completed just 5-of-17 pass attempts for 51 yards with one touchdown and one interception. He sustained a shoulder injury during the game and was unable to finish the contest. Due to multiple injuries throughout the 2015 campaign, Crompton only played in 3 games. He did not make an appearance for the Alouettes during the 2016 season. On April 4, 2017, Crompton was released by the Alouettes. Crompton has since retired from professional football.

== Career statistics ==
=== CFL ===
Year	Team	Passing						Rushing			
Year	Team	Cmp	Att	Yds	Y/A	TD	Int	Att	Yds	Avg	TD
2013	EDM	30	58	451	7.8	5	5	5	20	4.0	1
2014	MTL	179	308	2,482	8.1	11	8	28	154	5.5	0
2015	MTL	27	62	329	5.3	3	5	1	3	3.0	0
2016	MTL	Did not play due to injury									
Career		236	428	3,262	7.0	19	18	34	177	4.2	1

=== College ===
Year	Team	Passing								Rushing			
Year	Team	Cmp	Att	Pct	Yds	Y/A	TD	Int	Rtg	Att	Yds	Avg	TD
2005	Tennessee	(redshirt) Redshirted											
2006	Tennessee	31	66	47.0	401	6.1	4	2	111.9	16	18	1.1	0
2007	Tennessee	7	12	58.3	97	8.1	1	2	120.4	4	−9	−2.3	0
2008	Tennessee	86	167	51.5	889	5.3	4	5	98.1	37	27	0.7	2
2009	Tennessee	224	384	58.3	2,800	7.3	27	13	136.0	44	−52	−1.2	1
Career		348	629	55.3	4,187	6.7	36	22	123.1	101	−16	−0.2	3

== Coaching career ==
=== Toronto Argonauts ===
On August 18, 2019, Crompton joined the Toronto Argonauts (CFL) as an offensive coach to assist offensive coordinator Jacques Chapdelaine. He spent the remainder of the 2019 season with the Argonauts, but was not retained following a head coaching change for 2020.

=== Bishop's Gaiters ===
On January 18, 2022, it was announced that Crompton had joined the Bishop's Gaiters as the team's offensive coordinator and quarterbacks coach. On March 9, 2022, it was announced that Crompton would no longer serve as offensive coordinator at Bishop's.

=== Tuscola Mountaineers ===
On March 27, 2023, it was announced that Crompton had been named head football coach of his alma mater Tuscola High School in Waynesville, North Carolina.
