= Haywood Early College High School =

American public school in North Carolina

Coordinates: 35.5256°N 82.9279°W

Location
- 185 Freedlander Dr; Clyde, North Carolina 28721; United States

Information
- Motto: One Pack, One Goal
- Established: 2006 (20 years ago)
- Category: Public
- Principal: Lori Fox
- Teaching staff: 7.00 (FTE)
- Grades: 9 - 13
- Enrollment: 186 (2023–2024)
- Student to teacher ratio: 26.57
- Schedule: Early college high school
- Colors: Purple and gray
- Athletics conference: N/A
- Mascot: Wolfpack
- Website: hec.haywood.k12.nc.us

Haywood Early College is a public high school located on the campus of Haywood Community College. Haywood Early College High School enrolls students in grades 9 through 13. Students who complete the full program earn both a high school diploma and a two-year transfer degree.

== History ==
Haywood Early College opened in the fall of 2006 supported by a grant from the Bill and Melinda Gates Foundation and in collaboration with the North Carolina New Schools Project.

It serves a population of approximately one hundred and ninety students.

== Academics ==
Haywood Early College has achieved considerable academic success. HEC earned an A rating from the state for the 2013–2014 academic year. As of June 2026, SchoolDigger ranked HEC 20th out of 641 North Carolina high schools, and was recognized as a National Blue Ribbon School in 2018. The school was also recognized as an Apple Distinguished School from 2021-2024 and again from 2024-2027.
