= North Henderson High School =

American public school in North Carolina

Location
- 35 Fruitland Rd; Hendersonville, North Carolina 28792; United States; 35°21′40″N 82°25′22″W

Information
- Established: 1993 (33 years ago)
- School district: Henderson County Schools
- CEEB code: 341115
- Principal: John Shepard
- Staff: 67.74 (FTE)
- Grades: 9–12
- Enrollment: 1,044 (2023-2024)
- Student to teacher ratio: 15.41
- Colors: Purple and gold
- Website: hendersoncountypublicschoolsnc.org/nhh/

North Henderson High School is a public high school located in Hendersonville, North Carolina. It is one of four public high schools located in Henderson County. North Henderson was founded in 1993, as the majority of students were moved from the now closed Edneyville High School. North is located adjacent to Apple Valley Middle school which inherited the vast majority of their students from Edneyville Junior High. As of 2016, North Henderson had 1,023 students enrolled and 64 teachers on staff.

== History ==
In 1993, the Hendersonville City School System merged with the Henderson County Schools to form the Henderson County School System. Many alumni of Edneyville High School fought to bring the name and mascot of the school to the new facility to no avail. (The current site of Edneyville High School is now the home of the Justice Academy, a North Carolina law enforcement training center.) While the Edneyville Yellow Jackets name only remains with the community elementary school, the awards, banners, and trophies from the high school are on display at North Henderson.

In 2013, the Henderson County Education History Initiative held a fundraiser to raise funds to memorialize the former Edneyville High School site. The Edneyville Initiative was spearheaded by former Edneyville and North Henderson teachers Rosemary Pace and Nancy Edwards.

North Henderson's first, and longest tenured, principal was Charles Edward Thomas, who was also the last serving principal of Edneyville High School (1986–1993). The school held a student body vote for the school mascot, with the Knights winning the tally. Thomas drove to Lightfoot, Virginia to haul in an enormous Knight that still sits in the school's Commons Area.

The current principal of North Henderson High School is Dr. John Shepard.

== Athletics ==
North Henderson is a member of the Western North Carolina Athletic Conference. As of 2016, North Henderson competes as a 3-A school in the statewide competition.

North Henderson currently sponsors the varsity competition for men and women in soccer, tennis, golf, cross country, indoor and outdoor track & field, and basketball. Varsity men's sports offered are football, wrestling, and baseball. Varsity women's sports offered are volleyball and softball.

The Knights play home football games at Glenn C. Marlow Stadium, and host basketball, volleyball, and wrestling at Tom Pryor Gymnasium, named in honor of legendary Edneyville High School Women's Basketball Coach. Pryor died in 2010, and was the former record holder for most wins in state history in girls basketball.

=== State Championships ===
The following teams won team state championships, sponsored by the North Carolina High School Athletic Association (NCHSAA):

- Boys Cross Country: 1996 (1A/2A), 1997 (2A), 1998 (2A), 2001 (2A), 2002 (2A)
- Girls Cross Country: 1997 (2A), 2000 (2A)
- Boys Outdoor Track & Field: 1999 (2A), 2001 (2A), 2002 (2A)
- Wrestling State Tournament Team: 1994 (1A/2A)

=== Track & field and cross country ===
North also claimed relay championships in the men's 3200-meter relay (2001, 2002, 2003), the women's 3200-meter relay (2002), and the women's 1600 meter relay (2006). Individually, the Boys' Track & Field claimed 22 individual championships, and the Girls' Track & Field won 5 individual championships.

North also claimed seven state cross country championships and seven individual state titles.
