= Pisgah High School (North Carolina) =

Public secondary school in North Carolina, United States

Location
- 1 Black Bear Dr; Canton, North Carolina 28716; United States; 35°31′18″N 82°50′38″W

Information
- School type: Public secondary school
- Established: 1966 (60 years ago)
- School district: Haywood County Schools
- CEEB code: 340565
- Principal: Clint Conner
- Faculty: 57.56 (FTE)
- Enrollment: 927 (2022–23)
- Student to teacher ratio: 16.10
- Campus type: Rural
- Colors: Black and Red
- Mascot: Black Bear
- Rival: Tuscola High School
- Website: phs.haywood.k12.nc.us

Pisgah High School is a public senior high school located in Canton, North Carolina, United States, approximately 25 miles (40 km) west-southwest of Asheville.

== History ==
Pisgah High School sits on 32.54 acres. It opened in 1966 and resulted from both the consolidation of the Canton City and Haywood County Schools System, as well as the consolidation of Canton, Reynolds, Clyde, and Bethel High Schools. The yearbook is The Pisgahteer.

== Academics ==
For its college-bound students, Pisgah offers advanced placement tests. Commonly referred to as AP Exams, these tests are administered by the College Board and are intended to give students a chance to earn college credits by taking college level courses in high school. Currently, Pisgah offers AP courses in Calculus AB, Chemistry, English Literature & Composition, Psychology, U.S. History, and several others. Pisgah also offers numerous honors classes, as well as many vocational classes in subjects such as agriculture, auto-mechanics, horticulture, computer sciences, and more. Pisgah has a strong vocational department which includes several courses offered through Haywood Community College, HCC for short. Through HCC's Dual Enrollment Program, students are allowed to take college courses as a part of their course loads at Pisgah for free. Many students take advantage of this opportunity to earn college credit.

Pisgah employees a faculty of experienced teachers, with 68% having taught for more than ten years. There are currently five national board certified teachers at Pisgah. On average, there are fifteen students per teacher at Pisgah.

== Rivalry ==
As one of the two major high schools in the Haywood County Schools System, there is a rivalry between Pisgah and the other, Tuscola High School. This rivalry takes head each year in a traditional football game between the two schools, which draws between ten thousand and twelve thousand fans. The rivalry actually dates back to 1922 when Waynesville Township High School first played Canton High School.

== Athletics ==
After 16 years as the coach of first the Canton Bears and then the Pisgah Bears, with a 133-32-7 record and three championships, Boyd Allen was taken to the hospital during the October 17, 1969 game. He died at age 46 and his death was announced at the end of the game.

A June 8, 2021, conference realignment placed Pisgah in a newly formed Mountain 7 3A athletic conference with East Henderson, Franklin, North Henderson, Smoky Mountain, (arch rival and the reigning Haywood county champions) Tuscola, and West Henderson High Schools. Previously, beginning in 2017, Pisgah was a member of the AA Mountain 6 Conference.

Pisgah athletic teams have earned several state titles. The softball team won the 2011 2A state championship. The boys basketball won the 2005 state championship, and returned to the state championship final in 2008. The football team has won four state championships (1966, 1971, 1975, and 1976). The fall sports Pisgah offers are: cross country, football, girls tennis, volleyball, and boys soccer. Winter sports are: boys basketball, girls basketball, and wrestling. Spring sports offered are: softball, baseball, track, girls soccer, golf, and boys tennis. Pisgah has also won state championships in wrestling, boys golf, and girls basketball.
