= Southeast Tourism Society =

American nonprofit tourism organization

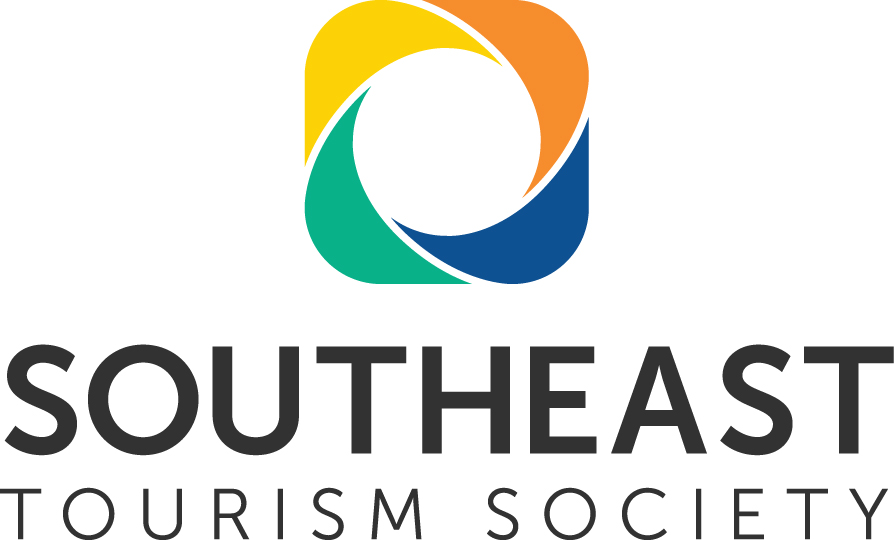
- Formation: 1983; 43 years ago
- Type: Non-profit
- Headquarters: Roswell, Georgia 30076 USA
- Location: 555 Sun Valley Drive, Suite E5
- Members: 1,200+
- Official language: English
- President & CEO: Bill Hardman
- Staff: 4
- Website: www.southeasttourism.org; escapetothesoutheast.com

The Southeast Tourism Society (STS), is a non-profit membership organization promoting tourism within the 13 Southeastern member states and the District of Columbia. It promotes sharing resources, fostering cooperation, networking, providing continuing education, cooperative marketing, consumer outreach, advice & consultation, governmental affairs and other programs. Southeast Tourism Society works with and for business-to-business and business-to-consumer companies with an interest in travel & tourism as a business. Membership is open to any organization within the travel & tourism industry – attractions, destinations, associations, lodging and a wide range of service providers from printing to marketing, public relations to travel writers. Membership is focused on networking, the opportunity for education, advocacy and more. STS was established in September 1983, and the 12 member states include Alabama, Arkansas, Florida, Georgia, Kentucky, Louisiana, Mississippi, North Carolina, South Carolina, Tennessee, Virginia, and West Virginia.

== Activity ==
Consumer Outreach:

- Escape to the Southeast Travel Guide - 100,000 distribution (annual);
- Escape to the Southeast eNewsletter (monthly)
- Escape to the Southeast Web site

Conventions & Meetings:

- Spring Symposium & Fall Forum Members meeting
- Congressional Summit(March)
- Marketing College (July)

Programs & Activities:

- Advocacy programs designed to let leaders hear the voices of the industry
- Southeast Travel & Tourism Research Association (TTRA) Management

Award Programs:

- Shining Example Awards
- Top 20 Events in the Southeast
