= Haywood Community College =

Public college in Clyde, North Carolina, US

- Motto: Education changes everything
- Type: Public community college
- Established: 1965 (61 years ago)
- Parent institution: North Carolina Community College System
- Chairperson: Tammy Hall McDowell
- President: Shelley White
- Undergraduates: 1,785 (2021-22)
- Location: Clyde, North Carolina, United States; 35.52755°N 82.93043°W
- Campus: 120 acres (49 ha); Suburban
- Nickname: Bobcats
- Website: www.haywood.edu

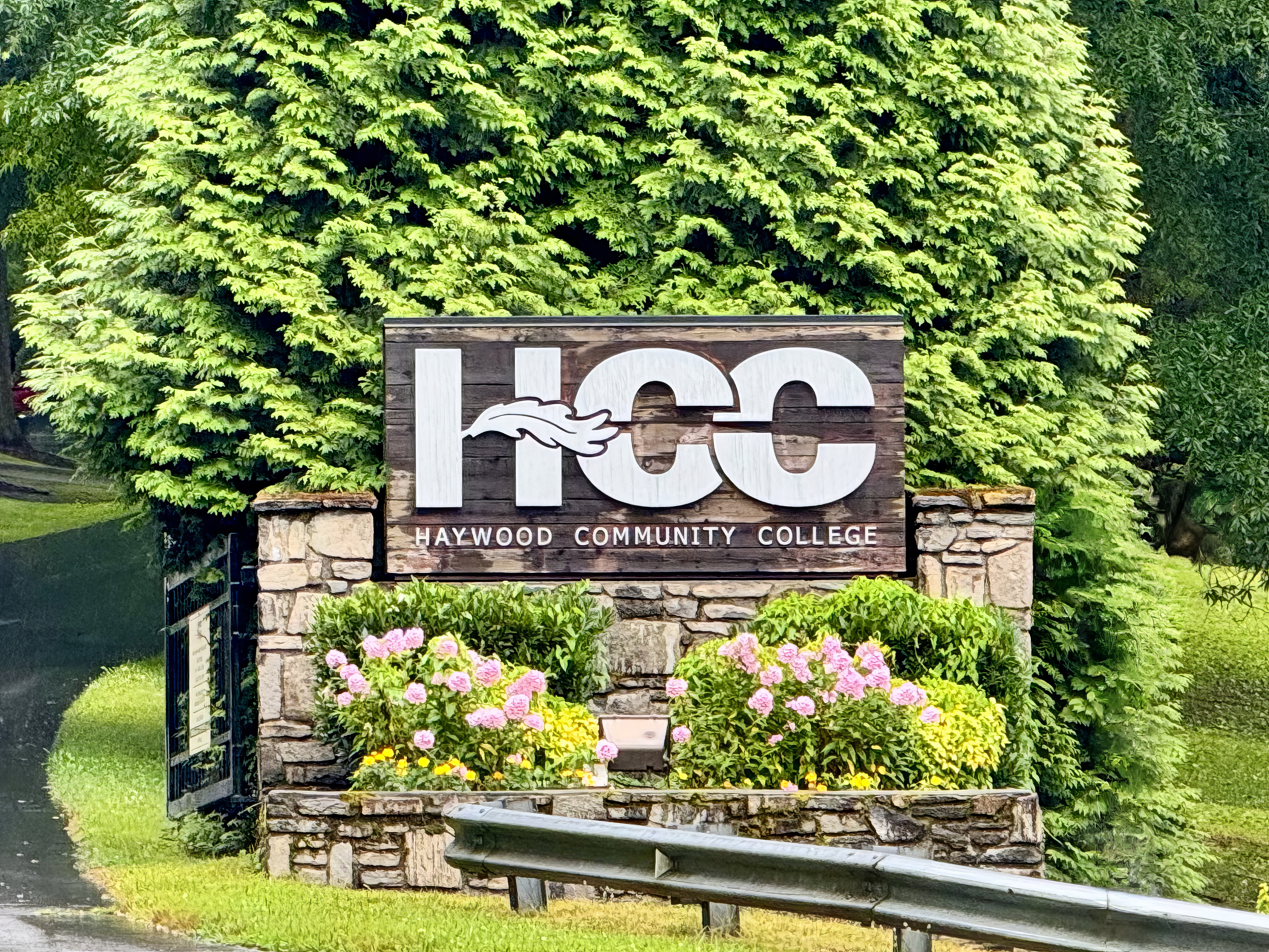
The sign at the campus entrance

Haywood Community College is a public community college in Clyde, North Carolina. It is part of the North Carolina Community College System. Established in 1965, the college offers associate degree programs and online courses in programs such as forestry, fish and wildlife management, and professional crafts. The college's 120-acre (49 ha) campus includes an arboretum, a mill pond, and a working gristmill constructed by students.

== Haywood Early College High School ==
Haywood Early College (HEC) is a Co-op Innovative High School partnership between Haywood County Schools and the College. The partnership, created by state legislation, enables students to concurrently obtain a high school diploma and complete an associate degree program within four or five years. HEC is designed to blend secondary and post-secondary experiences in innovative ways. All HEC faculty members commit to ensuring every student is actively engaged, challenged, and supported in all classes, every day, to succeed in rigorous coursework. HEC's ultimate goal is for each student to successfully complete the early college program with his/her high school diploma, Associate degree, and continue on to a four-year university.

== Arboretum ==
The Haywood Community College Arboretum is a 120 acres (49 ha) arboretum located across the campus of Haywood Community College. It is open daily without charge.

The arboretum was laid out by Asheville landscape architect Doan Ogden for industrialist A. L. Freedlander, who donated the college's initial funding provided that the site's oak forest be preserved. An early inventory recorded 880 trees including 22 native species, many averaging 100 years old. Since then the arboretum staff has added further species of trees, shrubs, and ground covers.

Arboretum features include a rhododendron garden containing many varieties of rhododendron, conifers, dahlia garden featuring numerous varieties, fruit tree orchard, greenhouse, nature trail, and perennials.
