= Clyde, North Carolina =

- Town
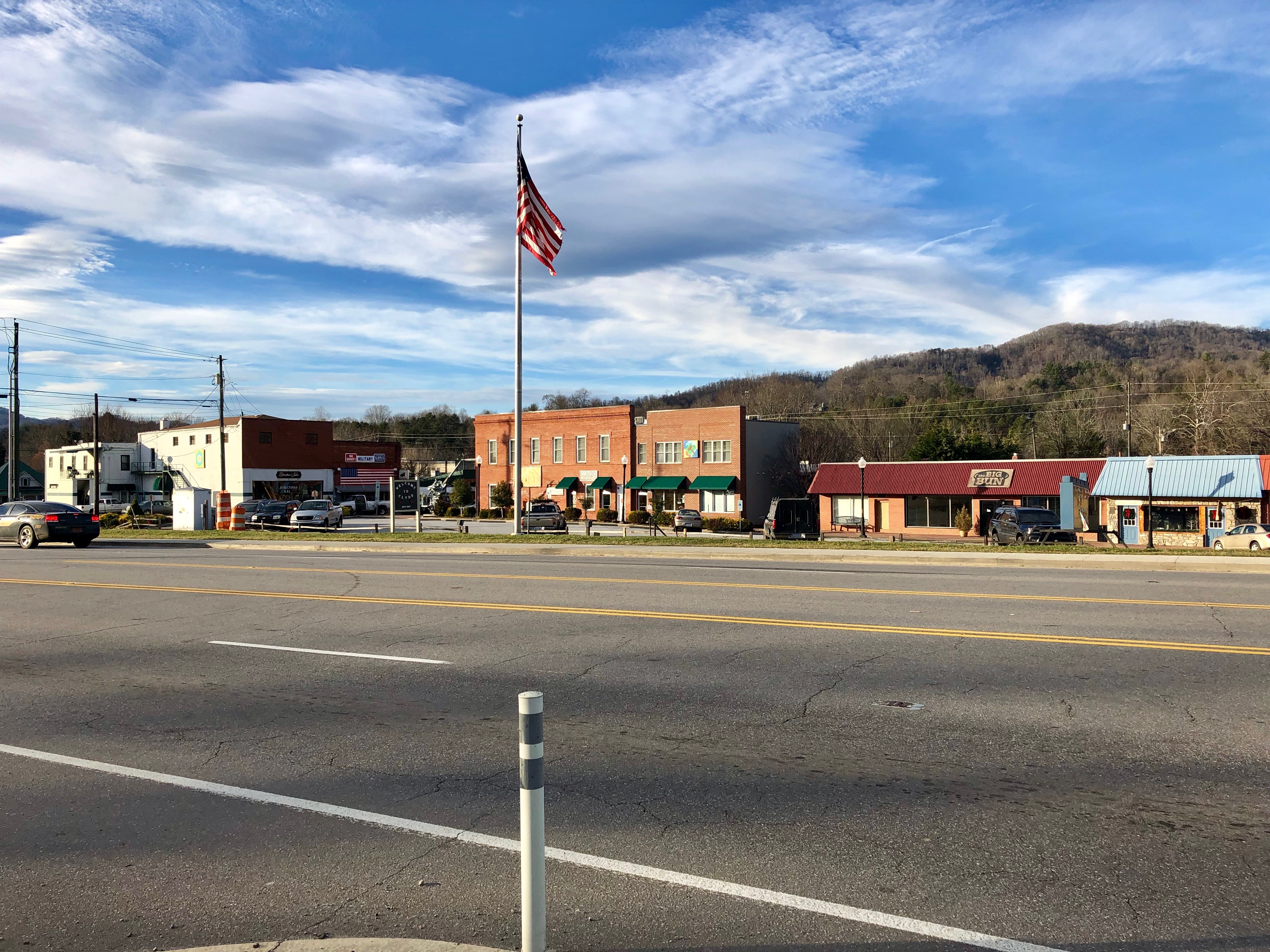
- Depot Street in Downtown Clyde

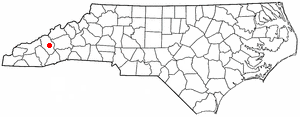
- Location of Clyde, North Carolina
- Coordinates: 35°31′59″N 82°54′39″W
- Country: United States
- State: North Carolina
- County: Haywood

Government
  - Type: Council-Manager
  - Mayor: Jim Trantham

Area
  - Total: 0.86 sq mi (2.24 km^{2})
  - Land: 0.86 sq mi (2.24 km^{2})
  - Water: 0 sq mi (0.00 km^{2})
- Elevation: 2,539 ft (774 m)

Population (2020)
  - Total: 1,368
  - Density: 1,580.4/sq mi (610.19/km^{2})
- Time zone: UTC-5 (Eastern (EST))
  - Summer (DST): UTC-4 (EDT)
- ZIP code: 28721
- Area code: 828
- FIPS code: 37-13280
- GNIS feature ID: 2406284

Clyde is a town in Haywood County, North Carolina, United States. As of the 2020 census, Clyde had a population of 1,368. It is part of the Asheville Metropolitan Statistical Area.

== History ==
Prior to European colonization, the area that is now Clyde was inhabited by the Cherokee people and other Indigenous peoples for thousands of years. The Cherokee in Western North Carolina are known as the Eastern Band of Cherokee Indians, a federally recognized tribe.

The city of Clyde was founded in 1890.

The area is prone to flooding. The town was damaged by Hurricane Ivan (2004), Tropical Storm Fred (2021) and Hurricane Helene in 2024.

The Shook-Welch-Smathers House was listed on the National Register of Historic Places in 2008.

== Geography ==
According to the United States Census Bureau, the town has a total area of 0.8 square miles (2.1 km^{2}), all land.

== Demographics ==
Historical population
Census	Pop.	Note	%±
1890	90		—
1900	244		171.1%
1910	344		41.0%
1920	363		5.5%
1930	458		26.2%
1940	516		12.7%
1950	598		15.9%
1960	680		13.7%
1970	814		19.7%
1980	1,008		23.8%
1990	1,041		3.3%
2000	1,324		27.2%
2010	1,223		−7.6%
2020	1,368		11.9%
U.S. Decennial Census

=== 2020 census ===
Clyde racial composition
Race	Number	Percentage
White (non-Hispanic)	1,156	84.5%
Black or African American (non-Hispanic)	33	2.41%
Native American	9	0.66%
Asian	2	0.15%
Other/Mixed	62	4.53%
Hispanic or Latino	106	7.75%

As of the 2020 United States census, there were 1,368 people, 509 households, and 351 families residing in the town.

=== 2000 census ===
As of the census of 2000, there were 1,324 people, 547 households, and 373 families residing in the town. The population density was 1,579.2 inhabitants per square mile (609.7/km^{2}). There were 607 housing units at an average density of 724.0 per square mile (279.5/km^{2}). The racial makeup of the town was 94.94% White, 2.49% African American, 0.98% Native American, 0.83% from other races, and 0.76% from two or more races. Hispanic or Latino of any race were 1.89% of the population.

There were 547 households, out of which 29.3% had children under the age of 18 living with them, 51.6% were married couples living together, 12.8% had a female householder with no husband present, and 31.8% were non-families. 26.7% of all households were made up of individuals, and 10.2% had someone living alone who was 65 years of age or older. The average household size was 2.33 and the average family size was 2.82.

In the town, the population was spread out, with 22.6% under the age of 18, 9.3% from 18 to 24, 28.1% from 25 to 44, 22.1% from 45 to 64, and 18.0% who were 65 years of age or older. The median age was 38 years. For every 100 females, there were 85.4 males. For every 100 females age 18 and over, there were 82.1 males.

The median income for a household in the town was $33,000, and the median income for a family was $39,531. Males had a median income of $28,542 versus $21,034 for females. The per capita income for the town was $15,991. About 11.0% of families and 15.0% of the population were below the poverty line, including 22.1% of those under age 18 and 12.1% of those age 65 or over.

== Education ==
Haywood County's only institution of higher education is Haywood Community College, a two-year college located just outside the city limits of Clyde.

The town also has Haywood Early College High School which is located on Haywood Community College's campus. Elementary Schools are Clyde Elementary and Riverbend Elementary School.

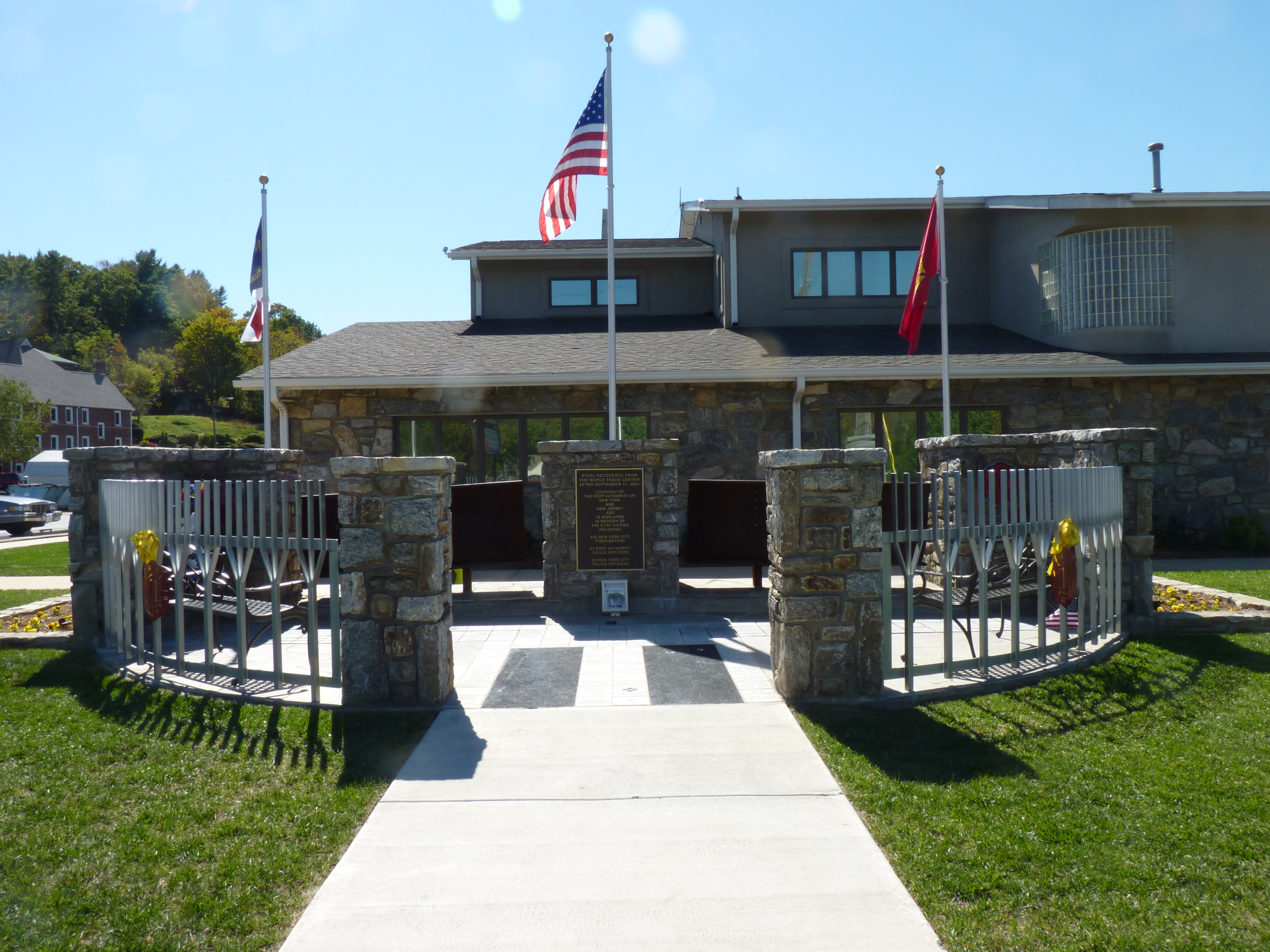
September 11 Memorial, dedicated to all the lives lost due to the attacks.

== Points of interest ==
- Haywood Community College Arboretum
- September 11 Memorial
