= Tuscola High School =

American public school in North Carolina

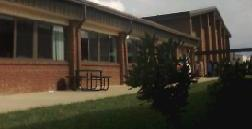

Location
- 564 Tuscola School Rd; Waynesville, North Carolina 28786; United States; 35°31′25″N 82°57′03″W

Information
- Established: 1966 (60 years ago)
- Category: Public
- CEEB code: 344214
- Principal: Casey Conard
- Staff: 56.93 (FTE)
- Grades: 9–12
- Enrollment: 911 (2023–2024)
- Student to teacher ratio: 15.95
- Schedule: Four 80-minute periods (August–June)
- Colors: Black and Gold
- Athletics conference: Mountain Eight 4A
- Mascot: Mountaineer
- Rival: Pisgah
- Website: www.ths.haywood.k12.nc.us

Tuscola High School is a public senior high school located in Waynesville, North Carolina, United States, about 20 miles west-southwest of Asheville. Tuscola High School succeeded the original Waynesville Township High School during the 1966 consolidation that merged Fines Creek and Crabtree High Schools with Waynesville. The school was built in the Tuscola community of East Waynesville, near Lake Junaluska and was named after the community in which it was built. Tuscola is a Cherokee word that means "digging in many places". The school's mascot is a Mountaineer and the school colors are black and gold.

== History ==
On September 30, 1963, the joint boards of education recommended that the schools of Haywood County consolidate. Due to the popular thought that larger schools could provide more opportunities at a more cost-effective price, plans were made to build two senior high schools, one on each side of the county. The construction of these new schools was to be financed by a $2.5 million bond, along with additional state and local funds. In order to make travel more reasonable for residents of Crabtree and Fines Creek, the location of the high school was moved from West Waynesville to an East Waynesville community near Lake Junaluska known as Tuscola. The name for the new high school became an issue for debate. Some wanted to keep the Waynesville name, while others suggested the name "Crabcreek", after the Crabtree and Fines Creek high schools. However, the school was named Tuscola, after the East Waynesville community in which it was built. The Waynesville school colors of black and gold and the Mountaineer mascot were both inherited by the new school.

== Extracurriculars ==
Tuscola is in the Mountain Eight 4A/5A conference.

=== Football team ===
The Tuscola High School football team won the 1972 3A NCHSAA football state championship.

The Tuscola–Pisgah rivalry celebrated its 100th anniversary in 2022. The first meeting between Waynesville Township High School and Canton High School took place in 1922.

=== Marching Band ===
The Tuscola High School marching band qualified to be a finalist at the Bands of America National Championship in 1982 and 1983.

== Notable alumni ==
- Brenda Mock Brown, women's college basketball coach
- Jonathan Crompton, former NFL and CFL quarterback, current head football coach at Tuscola
- Stephanie Glance, women's college basketball coach
- Judy Green, volleyball coach
- Joe Sam Queen, North Carolina politician and architect
