= Great Smoky Mountains Expressway =

Highway in North Carolina, United States

Route information
- Maintained by NCDOT
- Length: 43.0 mi (69.2 km)
- Existed: September 16, 1983–present
- Component highways: US 19, Lake Junaluska–Clyde; US 23, Dillsboro–Clyde; US 74, Bryson City–Clyde; US 441, Cherokee–Dillsboro

Major junctions
- West end: US 19 / US 74 near Bryson City
- US 441 near Cherokee; US 23 / US 441 near Dillsboro; US 276 in Waynesville; US 19 in Lake Junaluska; US 19 / US 23 in Clyde
- East end: I-40 / US 74 near Clyde

Location
- Country: United States
- State: North Carolina
- Counties: Swain, Jackson, Haywood

Highway system
- United States Numbered Highway System; List; Special; Divided; North Carolina Highway System; Interstate; US; State; Scenic

The Great Smoky Mountains Expressway is a four-lane divided highway that serves as the main east–west corridor through Southwestern North Carolina; connecting the towns of Bryson City, Sylva, and Waynesville to Interstate 40. Its establishment and funding was made possible by the Appalachian Development Highway System (ADHS), designed to generate economic development in previously isolated areas, supplement the Interstate Highway System, and provide access to areas within the region as well as to markets in the rest of the nation.

== Route description ==
The Great Smoky Mountains Expressway is a 43-mile-long (69 km) section of US 74; from US 19 (Alarka Road), near Bryson City, to I-40, near Clyde. The expressway also shares concurrences with three other major highways in the region: US 19, US 23, and US 441. The Expressway is broken into five segments: three freeway segments, where all major interchanges occur with 60 miles per hour (97 km/h) speed limit, and two expressway grade segments that links the freeway gaps along the route at 55 miles per hour (89 km/h) speed limit.

The western freeway segment begins at the US 19 (Alarka Road) interchange, south of Bryson City, and ends after the US 441 interchange, south of Cherokee. This 10-mile (16 km) segment serves as a bypass south of Bryson City, Ela, Whittier and Cherokee. All five exits in this segment provide direct or indirect link to nearby US 19, which is the older highway that follows more closely to the banks of the Tuckasegee River. The Expressway itself is routed along the north slopes of the Alarka Mountains and briefly through the Qualla Boundary before crossing the Tuckasegee River, at the Swain-Jackson county line. A 7-mile (11 km) expressway grade segment separates western and central freeway segments; curving along the north banks of the Tuckasegee River, the route's main feature is short cement median or cement wall that separate the lanes of traffic.

The 4.5-mile (7.2 km) central freeway segment serves as a bypass north of both Dillsboro and Sylva. Routed along the south slopes of the Plott Balsams, the Expressway features the major interchange with US 23/US 441, where travelers can go south to Franklin and on to Atlanta, Georgia. A 12.5-mile (20.1 km) expressway grade segment separates the western and eastern freeway segments; featuring a short cement median to separate the lanes of the traffic, it crosses the Jackson-Haywood county line at Balsam Gap, where it also connects to the Blue Ridge Parkway.

The eastern freeway segment begins at the US 23 Business (Balsam Road) interchange, southwest of Waynesville, and ends at the I-40 interchange, north of Clyde. This 9-mile (14 km) segment serves as a bypass west of Waynesville, while also serving Lake Junaluska and Clyde. Having been built in the mid-1960s, it is the oldest segment of the Expressway and features a short grassy median with guardrails separating traffic lanes. There is also a quirk where westbound travelers can utilize Exit 107 and then re-emerge back onto the Expressway at the Exit 106 on-ramps. Some travelers may see this as a short-cut and will typically drive faster exiting off and then back onto the Expressway. Traffic congestion is also more common in this segment of the Expressway.

The Great Smoky Mountains Expressway also makes up part of Corridor K and Corridor A in the Appalachian Development Highway System (ADHS). Corridor K connects I-75, in Cleveland, Tennessee, with US 23, in Dillsboro, North Carolina, overlapping 17 miles (27 km) of the Expressway. Corridor A connects I-285, in Sandy Springs, Georgia, to I-40, near Clyde, North Carolina, overlapping 26 miles (42 km) of the Expressway. ADHS provides additional funds, as authorized by the U.S. Congress, which has enabled the Expressway to be built and successive improvements along its route. The white-on-blue banner "Appalachian Highway" is used to mark the ADHS corridor.

=== Truck routes ===
The Great Smoky Mountains Expressway has two overlapping truck routes. US 19 Truck traverses the former US 19A route, between Bryson City and Lake Junaluska; signage appears only at the end points, with no reassurance signs along route. US 64 Truck overlaps between Dillsboro and Clyde; it is well signed throughout the route. Though US 441 has no truck route, commercial traffic is not allowed through the Great Smoky Mountains National Park; recommended instead to traverse east on US 74 and then west I-40 into Tennessee.

== History ==
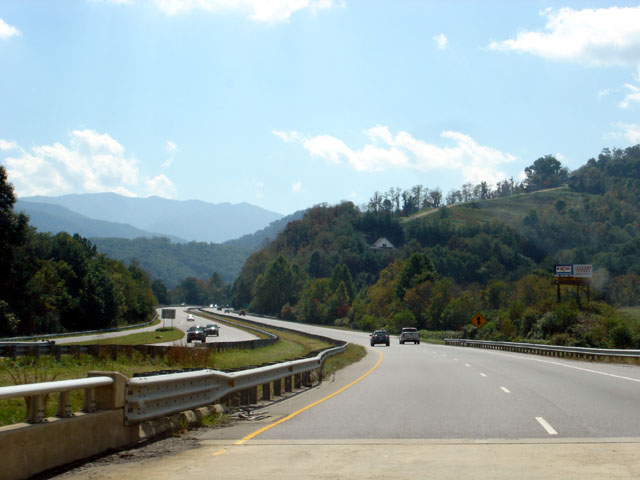
The Great Smoky Mountains Expressway through Waynesville

=== Pre-designation ===
The Great Smoky Mountains Expressway roughly follows the route of the historic Murphy Branch of the Western North Carolina Railroad, established in the late 19th century, now owned by the Blue Ridge Southern Railroad and the Great Smoky Mountains Railroad. In 1921, wagon roads that roughly paralleled the tracks were integrated as part of the new highway system in North Carolina; designated as NC 10, its routing through the southwestern North Carolina mountains connected it with the rest of the state, going as far east as to Beaufort. In 1927, US 19 was established along NC 10, west of Asheville; by 1934, NC 10 was eliminated from the route. In 1948, US 19 was rerouted between Ela and Lake Junaluska, via Soco Gap; its old alignment became US 19A.

In 1965, Congress authorized the construction of the Appalachian Development Highway System (ADHS) in the Appalachian Development Act of 1965. The ADHS was designed to generate economic development in previously isolated areas, supplement the interstate system, and provide access to areas within the region as well as to markets in the rest of the nation. US 19A benefited from the ADHS by being designated as part of Corridor K (Ela-Dillsboro) and Corridor A (Dillsboro-Clyde). The first freeway section opened in 1967, bypassing west of Waynesville and continuing northeast to I-40. The second freeway section opened in 1974, bypassing north of Dillsboro and Sylva. The third and final section of freeway opened in 1976, bypassing east of Bryson City to US 441. By 1979, the two gap sections were widened and improved to expressway grade, completing a four-lane highway from Bryson City to I-40.

To make the highway more consistent, in 1982, NCDOT submitted a request to AASHTO to swap US 19 and US 19A between Bryson City and Lake Junaluska; but was later withdrawn before the vote, in thanks to opposition by businesses in the resort town of Maggie Valley, who opposed losing US 19. In 1984, NCDOT made a new request to redesignate US 19A into US 19 Bypass; it was so approved.

=== Post-designation ===
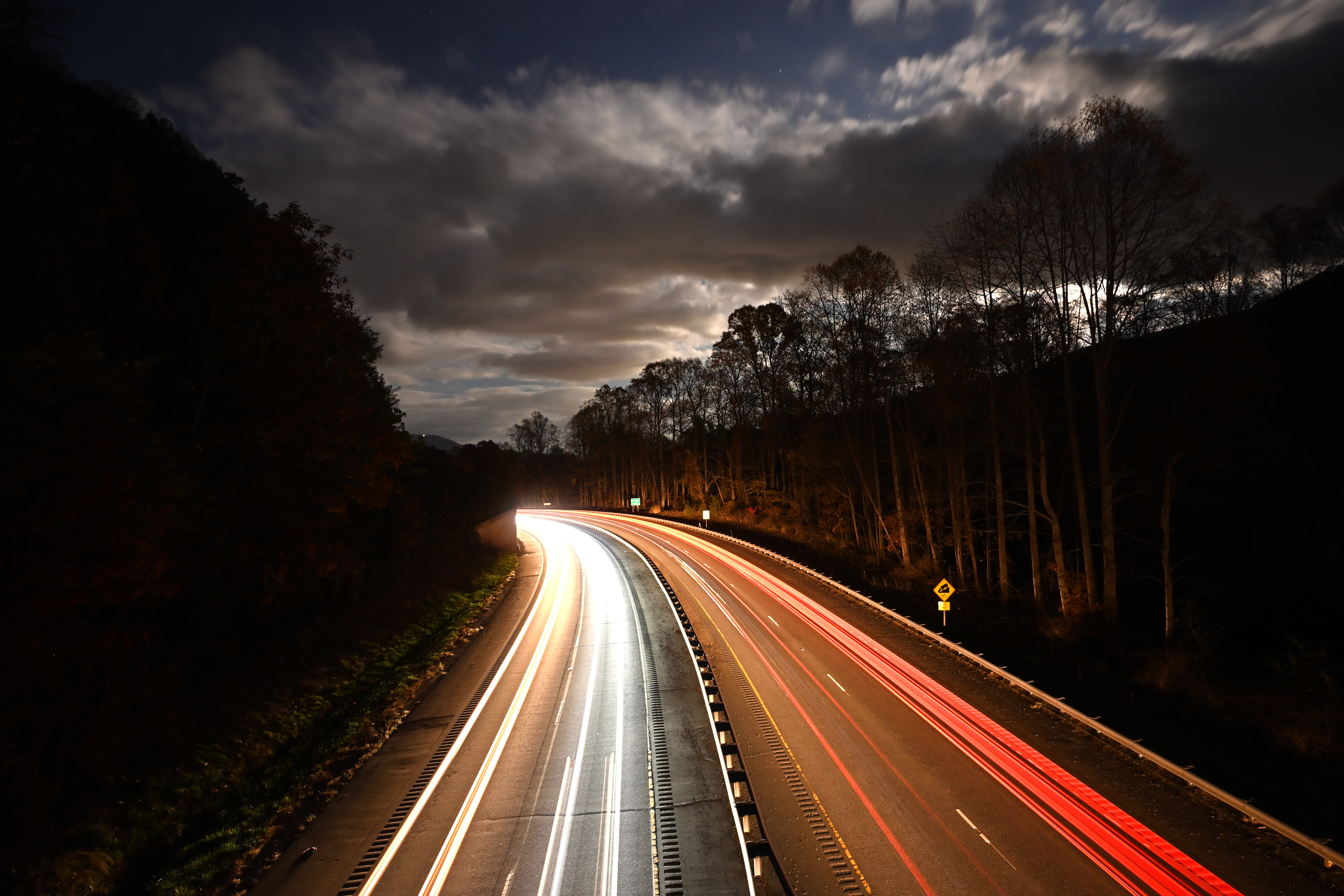
The Great Smoky Mountains Expressway through Balsam Gap, viewed from the Blue Ridge Parkway overpass

Established on September 16, 1983, the Great Smoky Mountains Expressway was designated along US 19, US 19 Bypass and the I-40 Connector, between Alarka Road and Interstate 40. Unofficially, US 19A was still designated along most of the route between Bryson City and Lake Junaluska, despite the official redesignation; this would continue to persist till the mid-1990s. In 1986, US 74 was extended west from Asheville to Chattanooga, Tennessee, which overlapped nearly all of the Great Smoky Mountains Expressway, via US 19 and US 19 Bypass; the following year, US 19 Bypass was decommissioned in favor of US 74. In late 1997, US 74 was rerouted onto the I-40 Connector, in Clyde, clinching all of Great Smoky Mountains Expressway.

Over the years, expressway sections of the Great Smoky Mountains Expressway have been improved by adding Superstreet designs, designating u-turns and eliminating traffic signal along the route.

== Junction list ==
County	Location	mi	km	Exit	Destinations	Notes
Swain		64.0	103.0	64	US 19 (Alarka Road) / US 74 west – Bryson City, Cherokee, Murphy	Begin of Great Smoky Mountains Expressway
Swain	Bryson City	66.9	107.7	67	US 19 Conn. north (Veterans Boulevard) – Bryson City, Great Smoky Mts National Park	
Swain		69.5	111.8	69	Hyatt Creek Road – Ela	
Jackson	Whittier	71.9	115.7	72	Whittier Road – Whittier	
Jackson		73.6	118.4	74	US 441 north – Great Smoky Mts National Park, Cherokee	North end of US 441 overlap; to Blue Ridge Parkway. East end of freeway section.
Jackson		81.1	130.5	81	US 441 / US 23 south – Dillsboro, Franklin, Atlanta	South end of US 23/US 441 overlap; eastbound listed as exit 81A; Eastbound exit 81B has no signage, goes to Rufus Robinson Road. West end of freeway section.
Jackson	Sylva	83.2	133.9	83	Grindstaff Cove Road – Sylva	
Jackson	Sylva	85.2	137.1	85	US 23 Bus. to NC 107 – East Sylva, Cullowhee	To Western Carolina University. east end of freeway section.
Haywood	Balsam	94.1	151.4		Blue Ridge Parkway	
Haywood	Waynesville	98.4	158.4	98	US 23 Bus. (Balsam Road) – West Waynesville	
Haywood	Waynesville	99.5	160.1	100	Hazelwood Avenue	West end of freeway section.
Haywood	Waynesville	101.7	163.7	102	US 276 – Waynesville, Brevard, Maggie Valley	Signed eastbound as exits 102A (south) and 102B (north)
Haywood	Lake Junaluska	103.3	166.2	103	US 19 south – Maggie Valley, Cherokee	South end of US 19 overlap; eastbound entrance and westbound exit
Haywood	Lake Junaluska	104.0	167.4	104	US 23 Bus. / NC 209 – Lake Junaluska, East Waynesville, Hot Springs	
Haywood	Lake Junaluska	105.2	169.3	105	West Jones Cove Road	
Haywood	Clyde	106.0	170.6	106	US 19 / US 23 north – Clyde, Canton	North end of US 19 and US 23 overlap
Haywood	Clyde	106.1	170.8	107	East Jones Cove Road	Westbound exit only, integrated with exit 106
Haywood		107.0	172.2		I-40 / US 74 east – Knoxville, Asheville	End of Great Smoky Mountains Expressway
1.000 mi = 1.609 km; 1.000 km = 0.621 mi: Concurrency terminus

== See also ==
- North Carolina Bicycle Route 2
