= Special routes of U.S. Route 19 =

Special routes of U.S. Route 19

Highway system
- United States Numbered Highway System; List; Special; Divided

Several special routes of U.S. Route 19 (US 19) exist. In order from south to north, they are as follows.

== Brooksville alternate route ==
U.S. Highway 19 Alternate
- Location: Bayonet Point–Brooksville, Florida
- Length: 32 mi (51 km)
- Existed: 1937–1938

U.S. Highway 19 Alternate (US 19 Alt.) was a former segment of US 19 that ran from Bayonet Point to Brooksville, Florida, which only existed for one year. It ran along what is today State Road 52 (SR 52) from Bayonet Point to Gowers Corner, and then turned north along US 41 into Brooksville.

== St. Petersburg–Holiday alternate route ==
U.S. Highway 19 Alternate
- Location: St. Petersburg–Holiday, Florida
- Length: 40.08 mi (64.50 km)
- Existed: 1951–present

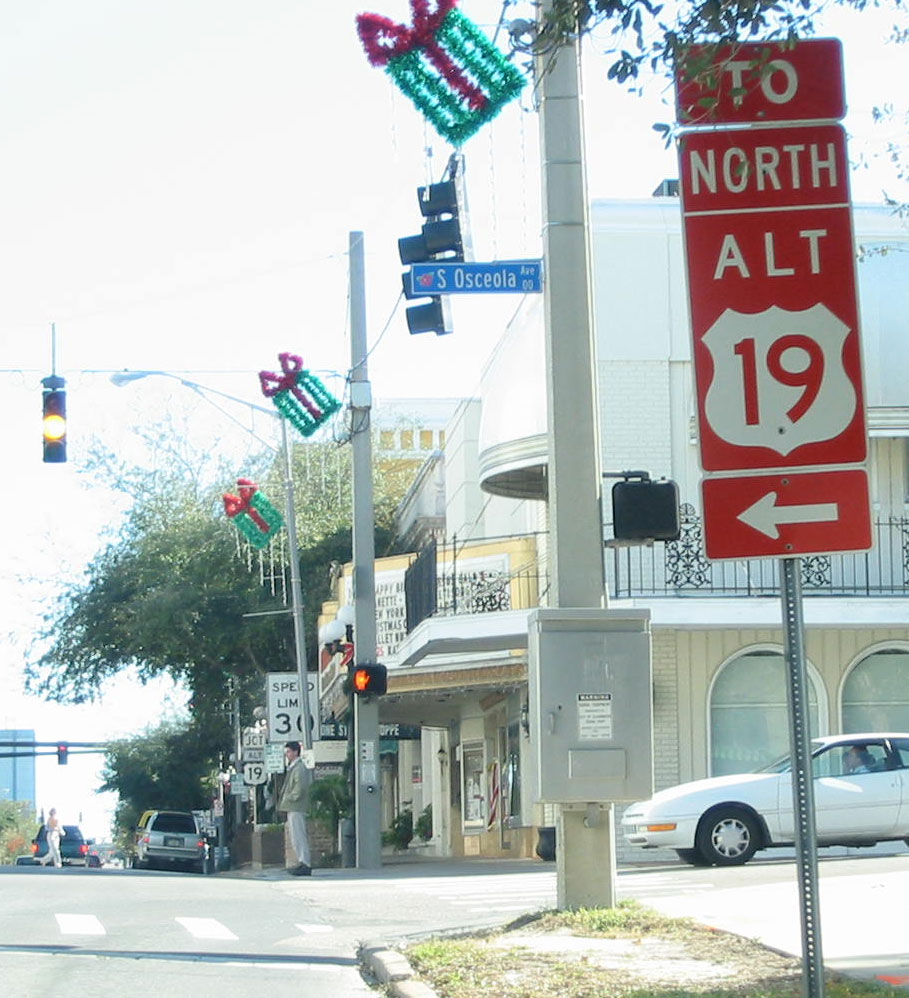
Red US 19 Alt. in Clearwater

U.S. Highway 19 Alternate (US 19 Alt.) is the 40.08-mile (64.50 km) former section of US 19 from St. Petersburg to Holiday, Florida.

Beginning at the intersection of 4th Street North (US 92 and SR 687) and 5th Avenue North in St. Petersburg, it runs west of US 19 near the Gulf coast passing through the cities of Seminole, Clearwater, Dunedin, and Tarpon Springs before ending at US 19 in Holiday, Pasco County. It is also the unsigned State Road 595 (SR 595) throughout the entire route, and runs along much of the Pinellas Trail.

== Thomasville–Meigs business loop ==
U.S. Highway 19 Business
- Location: Thomasville–Meigs, Georgia
- Existed: 1963–1986

U.S. Highway 19 Business (US 19 Bus.) was a business route of US 19 that originally existed from Thomasville to Meigs, Georgia. The roadway that would eventually become US 19 Bus. was established at least as early as 1919 as part of State Route 3 (SR 3) between the two cities. By the end of 1926, two segments of the highway had a "completed hard surface": a segment in the northern part of Thomasville and from approximately Ochlocknee to Meigs. A segment north-northwest of Thomasville had a "sand clay or top soil" surface. By the end of 1929, US 19 was designated on the then-current highway from Thomasville to Meigs.

By the middle of 1930, the entire segment of SR 3 that became US 19 Bus. had a completed hard surface. By the end of the year, the segment from the Florida state line to Thomasville was indicated to be under construction. In January 1932, the entire highway from Thomasville to Meigs had a completed hard surface. In 1934, a segment north-northwest of Thomasville was under construction. By June 1963, SR 333 was designated on US 19 between Thomasville and Meigs. SR 3's Thomasville–Meigs segment was shifted westward onto US 19 Bus. Its former path, on US 19, was redesignated as part of SR 333. By the end of 1965, the northern terminus of US 19 Bus. was truncated to just east of Ochlocknee. In 1982, all of SR 333 that remained was redesignated as SR 300. In 1986, US 19 Bus. was decommissioned.

== Albany business loop ==
U.S. Highway 19 Business
- Location: Albany, Georgia
- Length: 7.0 mi (11.3 km)

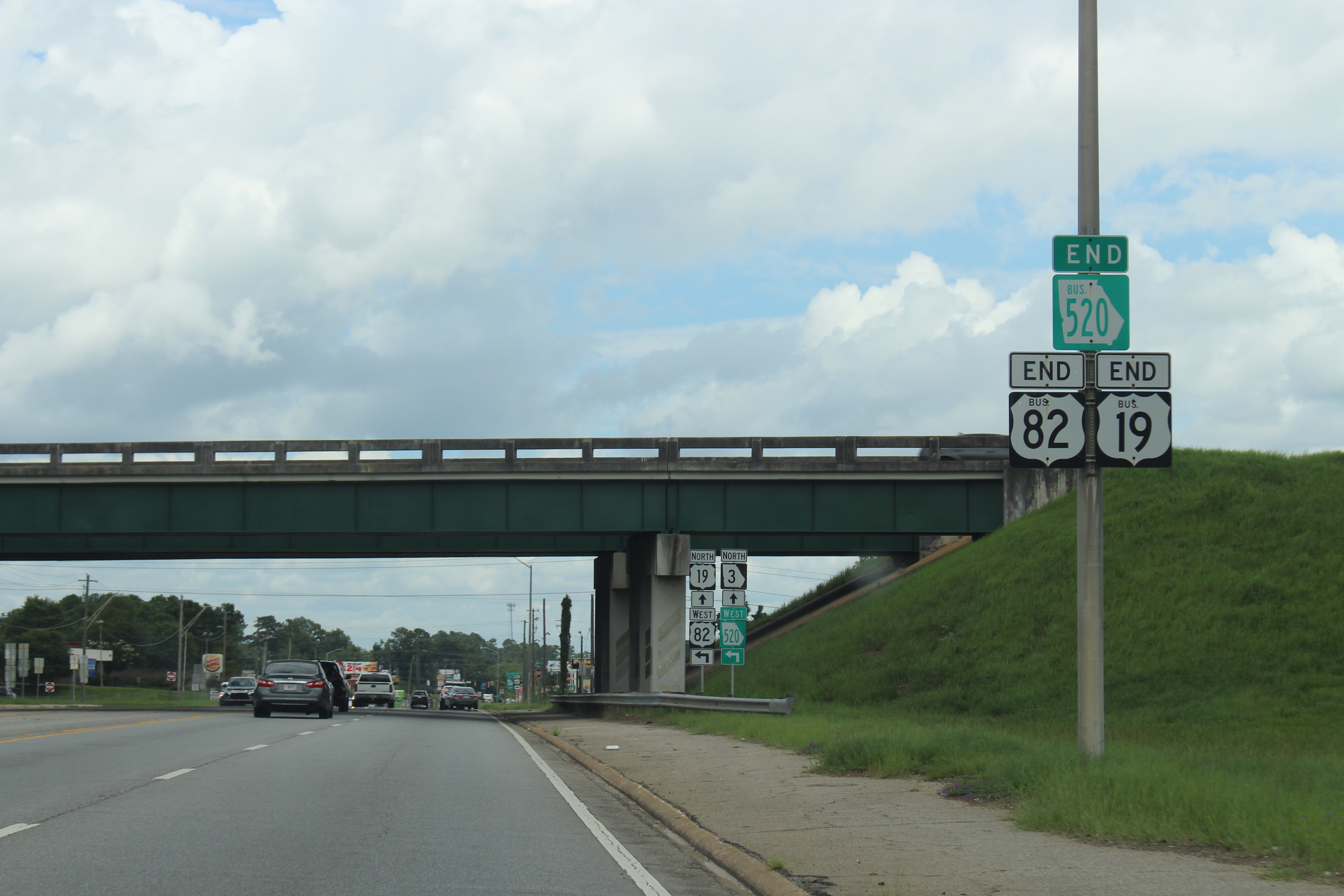
US 19 Bus. northern end in Albany

U.S. Highway 19 Business (US 19 Bus.) in Albany, Georgia, is concurrent with US 82 Bus. and SR 520 Bus. for its entire length. It begins at exit 2B on the Liberty Expressway and joins westbound US 82 Bus and SR 520 Bus. From there, US 19 Bus./US 82 Bus./SR 520 Bus. turn north at SR 234, which briefly joins the concurrency. The three business routes continue to the north until they end at exit 6 which is the western end of the US 19/US 82 concurrency.

The entire length of US 19 Bus. is part of the National Highway System, a system of routes determined to be the most important for the nation's economy, mobility, and defense.

== Leesburg bypass route ==
U.S. Highway 19 Bypass
- Location: Leesburg, Georgia
- Length: 1.8 mi (2.9 km)

U.S. Highway 19 Bypass (US 19 Byp.) is a 1.8-mile-long (2.9 km) western bypass of the city of Leesburg in Lee County, Georgia, which was completed in 2009. It is concurrent with State Route 3 Bypass (SR 3 Byp.) and briefly with SR 32. The entire length of US 19 Byp. is part of the National Highway System, a system of routes determined to be the most important for the nation's economy, mobility, and defense.

== Griffin business loop ==
U.S. Highway 19 Business
- Location: Griffin, Georgia
- Length: 6.5 mi (10.5 km)

U.S. Highway 19 Business (US 19 Bus.) in Griffin, Georgia, is concurrent with US 41 Bus. It begins at the intersection of US 19/US 41/SR 3/SR 7 and SR 155 and follows SR 155 north around Griffin–Spalding County Airport. Then it turns west at SR 16 until it curves onto SR 92 until finally ending at a wye interchange with US 19/US 41/SR 3. All of US 19 Bus. from the southern end of the SR 16 concurrency to the northern terminus is part of the National Highway System, a system of routes determined to be the most important for the nation's economy, mobility, and defense.

== Atlanta business loop ==
U.S. Highway 19 Business
- Location: Atlanta, Georgia
- Existed: 1953–1965

U.S. Highway 19 Business (US 19 Bus.) was a business route of US 19 that existed in Clayton and Fulton counties, Georgia. It partially traveled in Atlanta. At least as early as 1919, SR 3 traveled on essentially the same path as it currently does in the northern part of Clayton County and the southeastern part of Fulton County. By the end of 1926, US 41 had been designated on the entire length of SR 3 in these counties. The segment of the highway from just north-northwest of the Henry–Clayton county line to Marietta had a "completed hard surface". By the end of 1929, US 19 was designated on SR 3 in the two counties to the main part of Atlanta.

In 1953, US 19/US 41/SR 3 was shifted eastward onto the "Expressway" (the precursor of Interstate 75, or I-75) in the southern part of Atlanta, traveled west on Lakewood Avenue, and then resumed the northern path. The former path became US 19 Bus./US 41 Bus. By the end of 1965, US 19/US 41/SR 3 was shifted onto the former path of US 19 Bus./US 41 Bus. in the Atlanta area.

== Dahlonega business loop ==
U.S. Highway 19 Business
- Location: Dahlonega, Georgia
- Length: 4.7 mi (7.6 km)

U.S. Highway 19 Business (US 19 Bus.) in Dahlonega, Georgia, is concurrent with both SR 9 and SR 52.

== Murphy business loop ==
U.S. Highway 19 Business
- Location: Murphy, North Carolina
- Length: 3 mi (4.8 km)
- Existed: 1980–present

U.S. Highway 19 Business (US 19 Bus.) is a three-mile (4.8 km) business route established in 1980 that replaced the original US 19 routing through the city of Murphy, North Carolina, along Hiwassee Street, Valley River Avenue, Hill Street, Andrews Road, and Pleasant Valley Road.

== Andrews business loop ==
U.S. Highway 19 Business
- Location: Andrews, North Carolina
- Length: 3 mi (4.8 km)
- Existed: 1979–present

U.S. Highway 19 Business (US 19 Bus.) is a three-mile (4.8 km) business route established in 1979 replaced the original US 19 routing through the city of Andrews, North Carolina, along Main Street.

== Bryson City–Lake Junaluska truck route ==
U.S. Highway 19 Truck
- Location: Bryson City–Lake Junaluska, North Carolina
- Length: 39.3 mi (63.2 km)

U.S. Highway 19 Truck (US 19 Truck) is a truck route of US 19 located in Western North Carolina. Its routing follows the former routing of US 19A (1976–1983) and US 19 Bypass (1983–1987) along the Great Smoky Mountains Expressway, between Bryson City and Lake Junaluska. Signage appears only at the endpoints, with no reassurance signs along route.

== Bryson City connector route ==
U.S. Highway 19 Connector
- Location: Bryson City, North Carolina
- Length: 0.72 mi (1,160 m)
- Existed: 2011–present

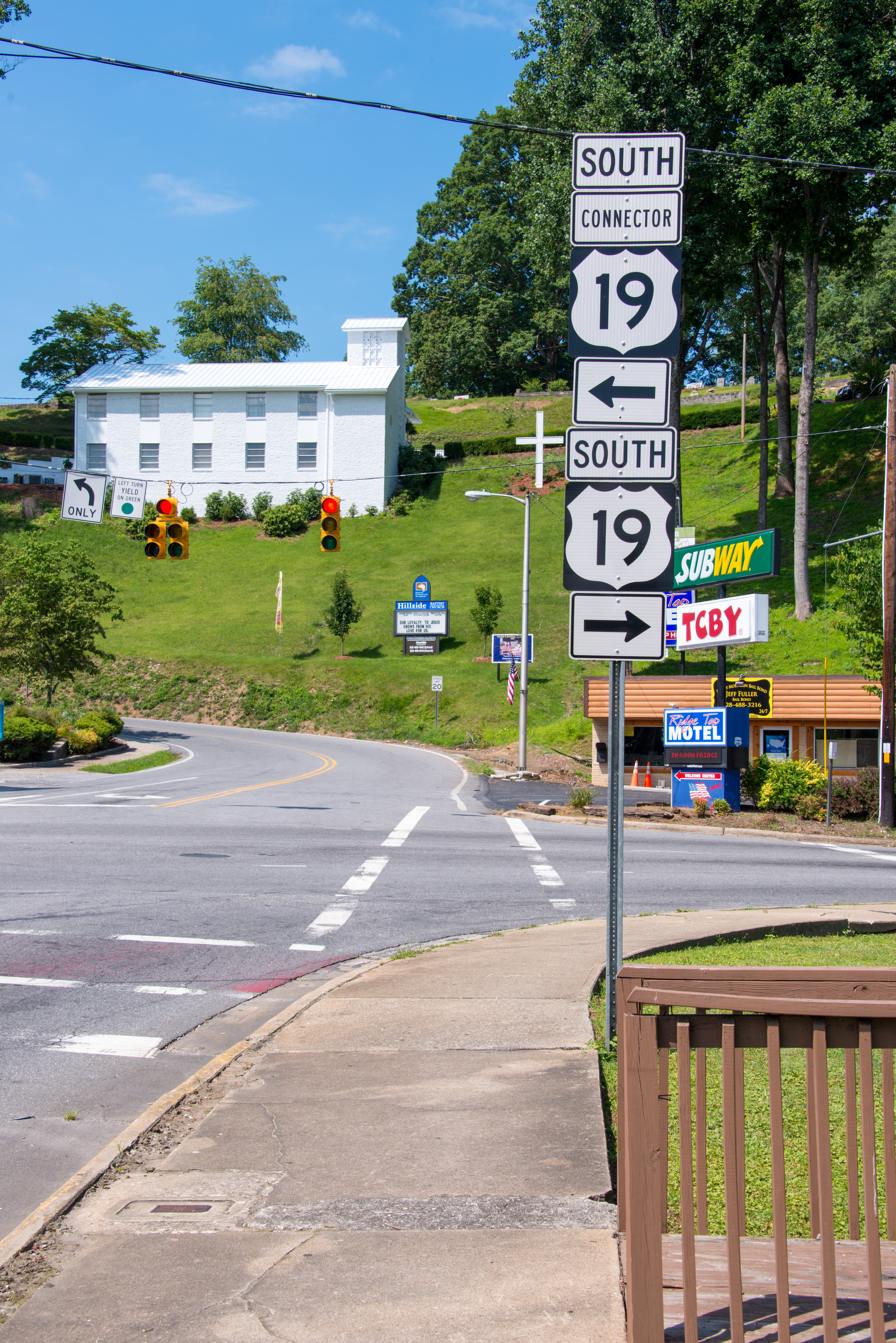
US 19 Conn., in Bryson City

U.S. Highway 19 Connector (US 19 Conn.) is a 0.72-mile (1.16 km) connector route established in October 2011 that connects US 19 (Main Street) with US 74 (Great Smoky Mountains Expressway) in Bryson City, North Carolina. Also known as Veterans Boulevard, it was upgraded to primary status because of real need of maintenance and Swain County's secondary route budget was unable to support it. The route is an undivided four-lane the entire length and serves as the main entrance to Bryson City.

Major intersections
The entire route is in Bryson City, Swain County.

mi	km	Destinations	Notes
0.00	0.00	US 74 (Great Smoky Mountains Expressway) – Murphy, Sylva	
0.72	1.16	US 19 (Main Street)	
1.000 mi = 1.609 km; 1.000 km = 0.621 mi

== Waynesville alternate route ==
U.S. Highway 19A
- Location: Waynesville, North Carolina
- Existed: 1939–1948

U.S. Highway 19A (US 19A) was routed through downtown Waynesville, North Carolina, along with US 23A (today as US 23 Bus.).

== Ela–Lake Junaluska alternate route ==
U.S. Highway 19A
- Location: Ela–Lake Junaluska, North Carolina
- Length: 28.8 mi (46.3 km)
- Existed: 1947–1948

U.S. Highway 19A (US 19A) was established in 1947, replacing part of North Carolina Highway 28 (NC 28), between Ela and Cherokee, North Carolina, and all of NC 293 between Cherokee and Lake Junaluska, via Soco Gap. In 1948, US 19 and US 19A swapped routes.

== Bryson City–Lake Junaluska alternate route ==
U.S. Highway 19A
- Location: Bryson City–Lake Junaluska, North Carolina
- Length: 39.3 mi (63.2 km)
- Existed: 1948–1983

U.S. Highway 19A (US 19A) was established in 1948 when US 19 swapped routes with the previous US 19A between Ela and Lake Junaluska, North Carolina, via Soco Gap. US 19A followed the old alignment of US 19 from Ela, through Dillsboro, Sylva, and Waynesville, to Lake Junaluska. Between 1954 and 1957, US 19A/US 23 was placed onto current routing bypassing Balsam. Between 1958 and 1962, US 19A/US 23 was placed on one-way streets through Sylva; northbound via Main Street and southbound via Mill Street. In 1967, US 19A/US 23 was rerouted on new freeway bypass west of Waynesville; its old alignment becoming US 23 Bus. In 1974, US 19A was placed on new freeway bypass north of Dillsboro and Sylva; its old alignment becoming US 23 Bus. In 1975, the relocation around Sylva was submitted to American Association of State Highway and Transportation Officials (AASHTO) for approval, but was denied by the subcommittee; despite the denial, North Carolina Department of Transportation (NCDOT) left signage as is. In 1976, US 19A was placed on new freeway bypass east of Bryson City, from Alarka Road to US 441; its old alignment from Ela to Whittier was downgraded to secondary road. In 1982, NCDOT submitted a request to AASHTO to switch US 19 and US 19A between Bryson City and Lake Junaluska; but was later withdrawn before the vote. In 1983, US 19A was redesignated US 19 Byp.; despite the change, signage along the route maintained US 19A during and after US 19 Byp. was also eliminated in 1987.

== Bryson City–Lake Junaluska bypass route ==
U.S. Highway 19 Bypass
- Location: Bryson City–Lake Junaluska, North Carolina
- Length: 39.3 mi (63.2 km)
- Existed: 1983–1987

U.S. Highway 19 Bypass (US 19 Byp.) was established in 1983 as a redesignation of US 19A between Bryson City and Lake Junaluska, North Carolina; this also coincides with the establishment of the Great Smoky Mountains Expressway. In 1987, US 19 Byp. was eliminated in favor for US 74, which was extended west of Asheville the prior year. Despite being officially US 19 Byp., signage along the route remained US 19A throughout, with some signs still marking the route until the mid-1990s.

== Asheville alternate route ==
U.S. Highway 19A
- Location: Asheville, North Carolina
- Length: 2.3 mi (3.7 km)
- Existed: 1949–1960

U.S. Highway 19A (US 19A) was routed along Haywood Road through Asheville, North Carolina. This route was rebranded as US 19 Bus. in 1960.

== Asheville business loop ==
U.S. Highway 19 Business
- Location: Asheville, North Carolina
- Length: 2.3 mi (3.7 km)
- Existed: 1960–present

U.S. Highway 19 Business (US 19 Bus.), established in 1960, is a 2.3-mile (3.7 km) business route currently starts on Haywood Road then go north on I-26/I-240 (exit 2) back to the main US 19 (exit 3). Historically, US 19 Bus. continued along Haywood Road, connecting to Clingman Avenue and then to Patton Avenue/US 19. In 1961, it extended over Patton Avenue through downtown Asheville when US 19 moved onto the East–West Freeway. In 1962, it was rerouted to its current alignment from Haywood Road to Hanover Street (now I-26/I-240). It is cosigned with US 23 Bus.

== Weaverville business loop ==
U.S. Highway 19 Business
- Location: Weaverville, North Carolina
- Length: 5.5 mi (8.9 km)
- Existed: 1967–present

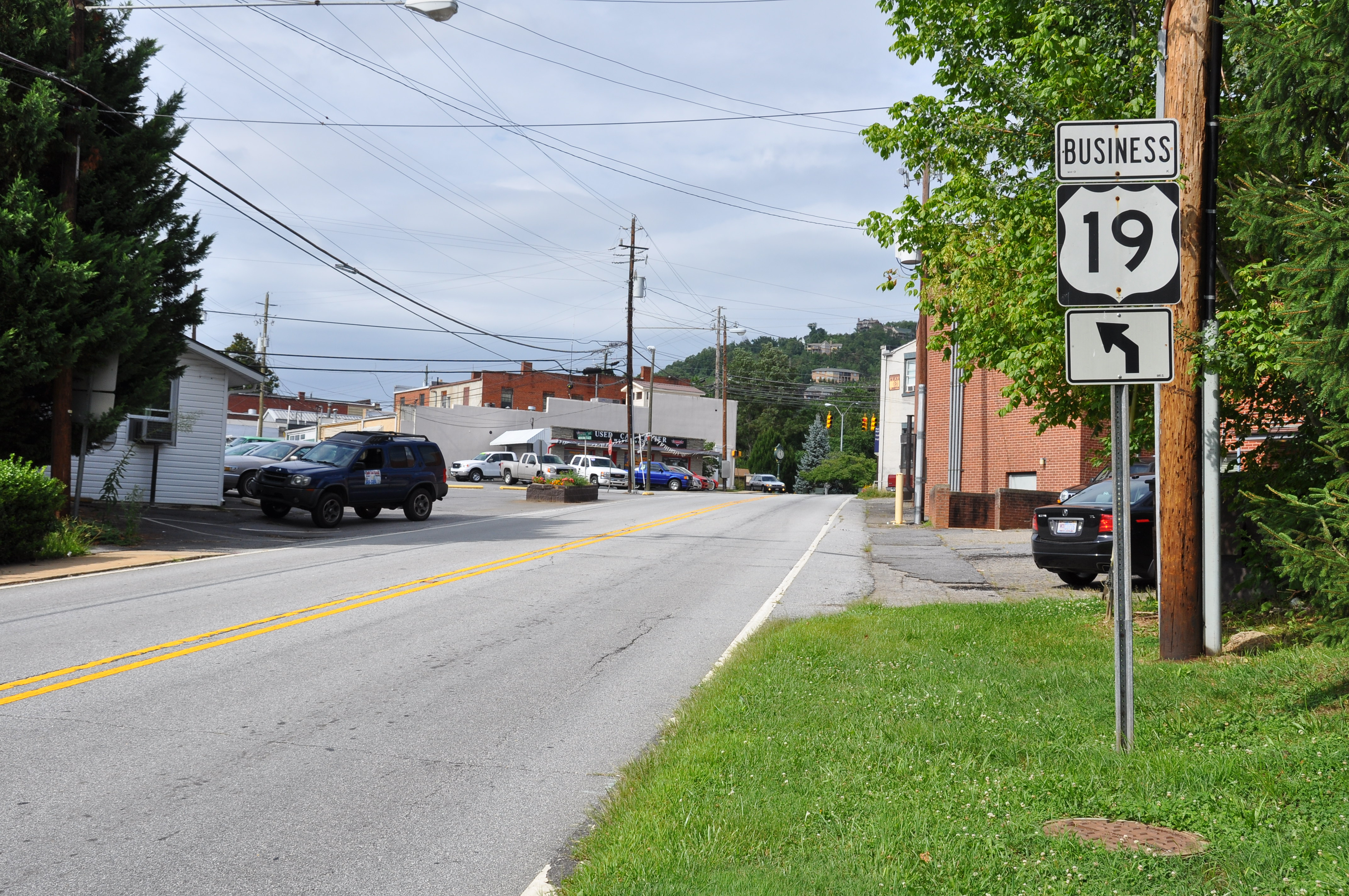
US 19 Bus. in Weaverville

U.S. Highway 19 Business (US 19 Bus.), established in September 1967, this 5.5-mile (8.9 km) business route follows the original US 19 mainline through the city of Weaverville, North Carolina. The business loop is clearly marked along the route, though the freeway bypass (I-26/US 19/US 23) does not mention it. It starts from exit 23 interchange (with a brief overlap with US 25), then goes north along Weaverville Road and Main Street; it reconnects with the freeway at the exit 18 interchange via Clarks Chapel Road/Monticello Road.

Major intersections
The entire route is in Buncombe County.

Location	mi	km	Destinations	Notes
Woodfin	0.0	0.0	Future I-26 / US 19 / US 23 / US 70 – Asheville, Marshall, Johnson City; US 25 (Merrimon Avenue)	Brief overlap with US 25
Weaverville	4.5	7.2	Weaver Boulevard	
Weaverville	5.5	8.9	Future I-26 / US 19 / US 23 – Asheville, Mars Hill, Johnson City	
1.000 mi = 1.609 km; 1.000 km = 0.621 mi

== Cane River–Elk Park alternate route ==
U.S. Highway 19A
- Location: Cane River–Elk Park, North Carolina

== Bristol truck route ==
U.S. Route 19 Truck
- Location: Bristol, Virginia
- Length: 2.2 mi (3.5 km)

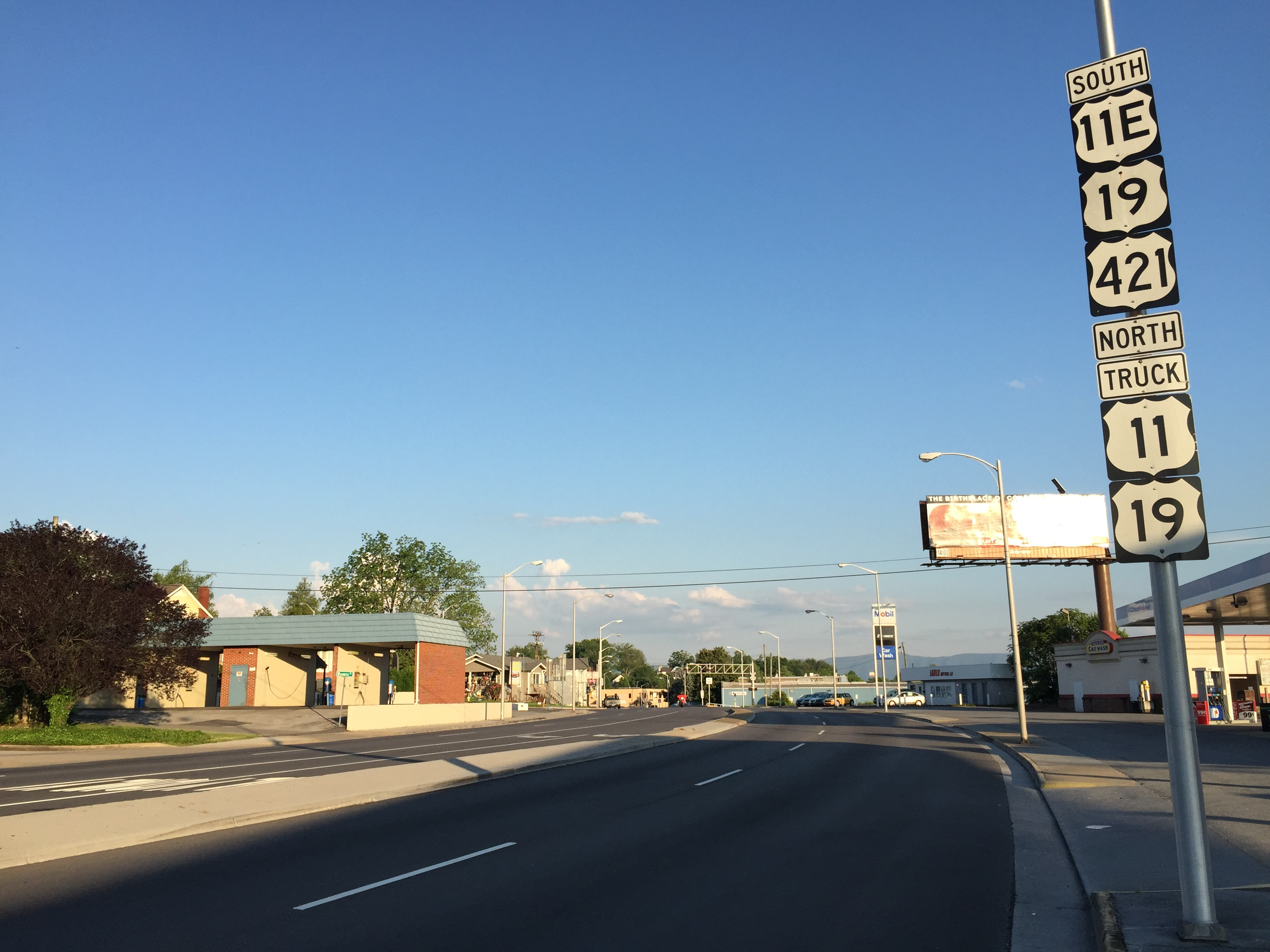
View north along US 19 Truck/US 11 Truck and south along US 11E, US 19, and US 421 at Euclid Avenue in Bristol

U.S. Route 19 Truck (US 19 Truck), which shares a complete concurrency with US 11 Truck, provides a bypass route for truckers avoiding the residential area of Euclid Avenue in Bristol, Virginia.

== Lebanon business loop ==
U.S. Route 19 Business
- Location: Lebanon, Virginia
- Length: 4.0 mi (6.4 km)
- Tourist routes: Virginia Byway

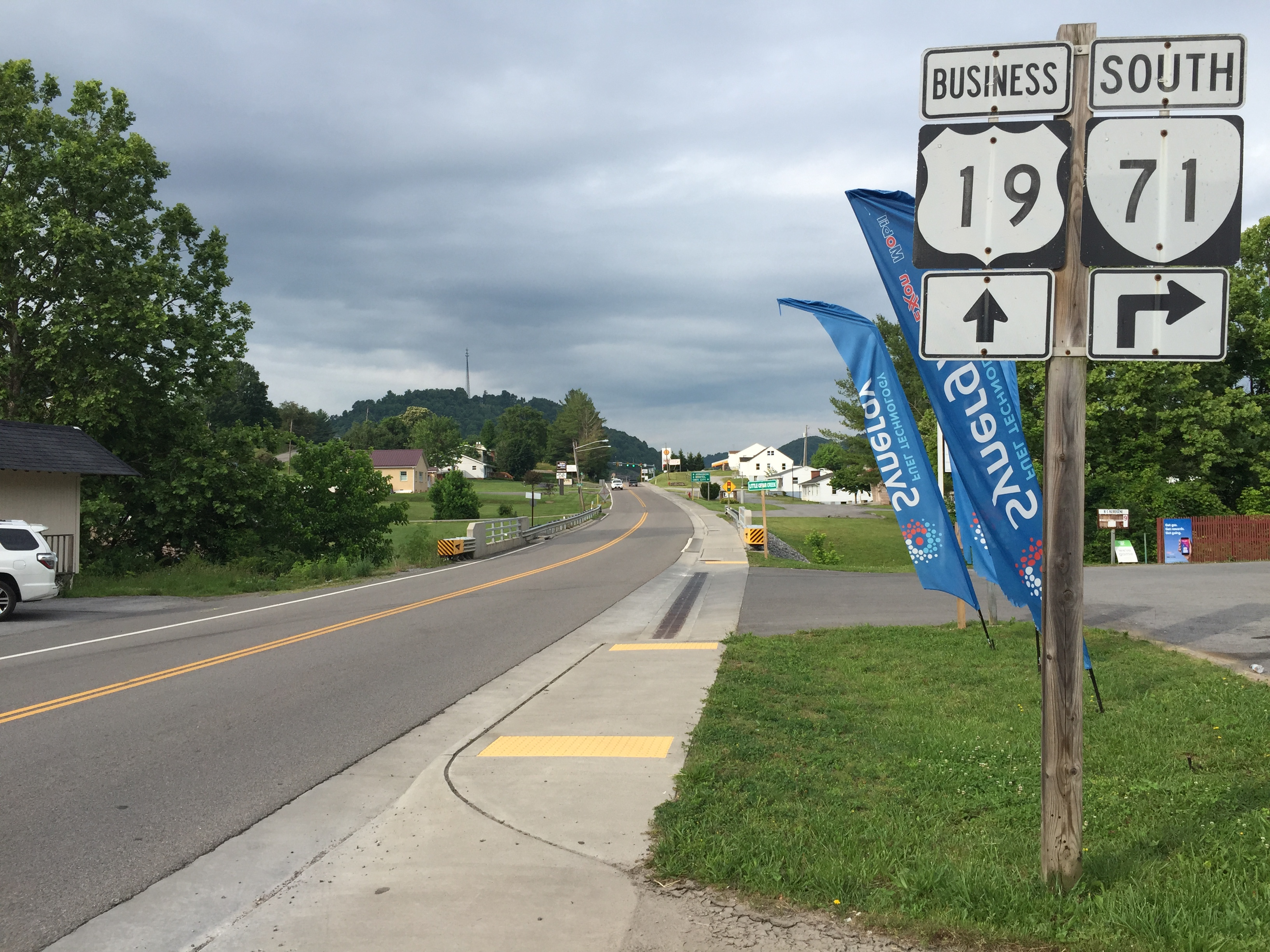
View south along US 19 Bus. at Little Cedar Creek in Lebanon

== Tazewell business loop ==
U.S. Route 19 Business
- Location: Tazewell, Virginia
- Length: 8.0 mi (12.9 km)
- Tourist routes: Virginia Byway

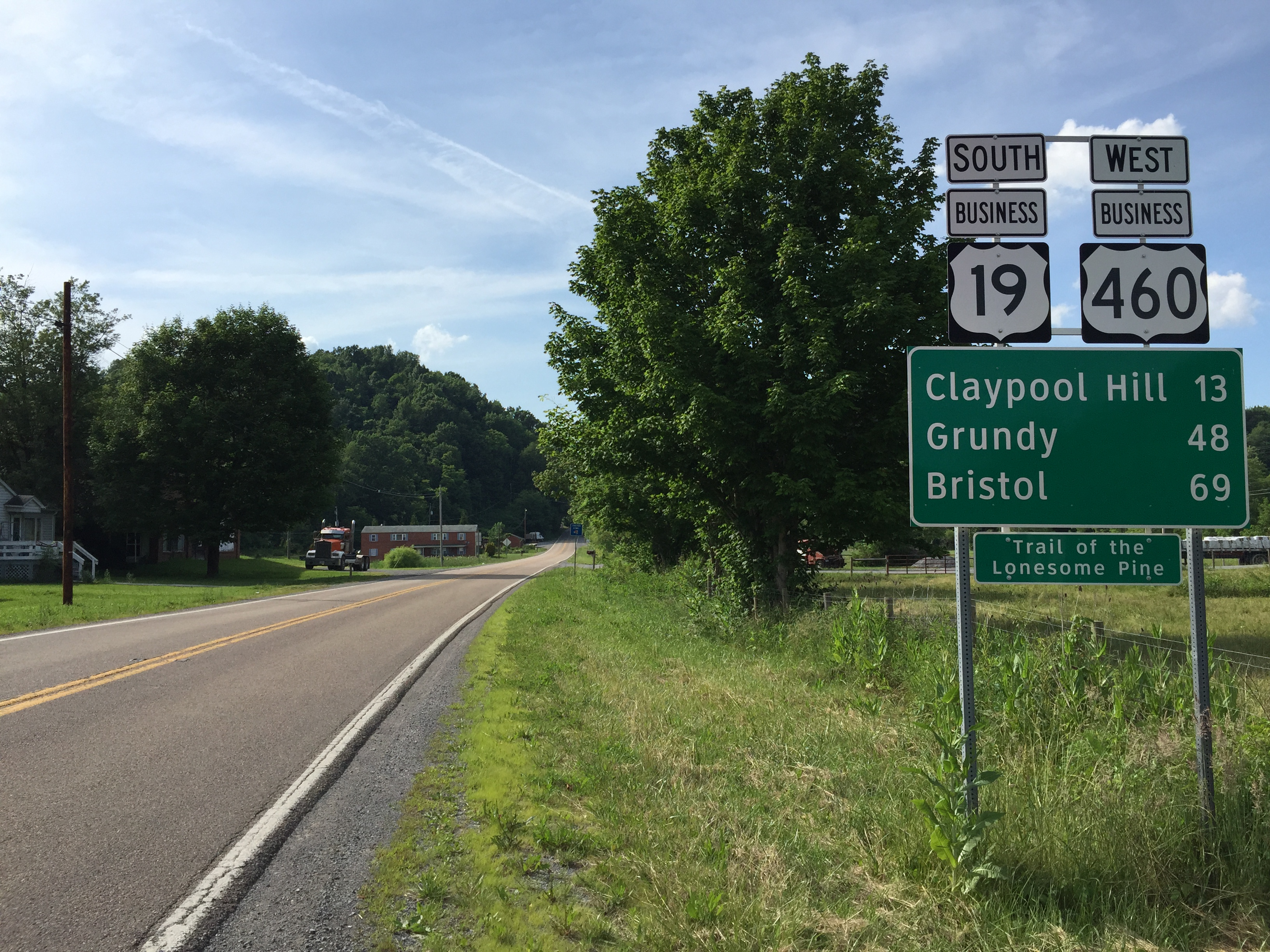
View south along US 19 Bus. and west along US 460 Bus. at State Route 91 in Frog Level

U.S. Route 19 Business (US 19 Bus.) is an eight-mile (13 km) business route of US 460 in Tazewell, Virginia. It is cosigned with US 460 Bus.

== Prosperity alternate route ==
U.S. Route 19 Alternate
- Location: Prosperity, West Virginia
- Length: 1.5 mi (2.4 km)

U.S. Route 19 Alternate (US 19 Alt.) is the internal designation for an unsigned route that connects US 19 and West Virginia Route 16 to the West Virginia Turnpike (I-64 and I-77) on the northwest edge of Prosperity, West Virginia, north of Beckley. The route is a limited-access freeway throughout and comprises the first 1.5 miles (2.4 km) of Corridor L.

Major intersections
The entire route is in Raleigh County.

Location	mi	km	Destinations	Notes
	0.0	0.0	I-64 / I-77 – Bluefield, Charleston	Southern terminus; toll on ramp to I-64 east/I-77 south
	0.9	1.4	US 19 south / WV 16 – Bradley, North Beckley	
	1.5	2.4	US 19 north – Summersville	Northern terminus; continuation beyond interchange
1.000 mi = 1.609 km; 1.000 km = 0.621 mi: Tolled

== Fairmont spur route ==
U.S. Route 19 Spur
- Country Club Road
- Location: Fairmont, West Virginia
- Length: 1.0 mi (1.6 km)

U.S. Route 19 Spur (US 19 Spur) is the internal designation for an unsigned route that connects US 19 and US 250 in the southwestern portion of Fairmont, West Virginia. The route is known locally as Country Club Road.

Major intersections
The entire route is in Fairmont, Raleigh County.

mi	km	Destinations	Notes
0.0	0.0	US 250 (Fairmont Avenue)	Southern terminus
1.0	1.6	US 19 (Locust Avenue) / Country Club Road (CR 19/22)	Northern terminus; continues as Country Club Road beyond US 19
1.000 mi = 1.609 km; 1.000 km = 0.621 mi

== Beckley business route ==
U.S. Route 19 Business
- Location: Beckley, West Virginia

== Pittsburgh truck route ==
U.S. Route 19 Truck
- Location: Pittsburgh, Pennsylvania
- Length: 19.4 mi (31.2 km)
- Existed: 1946–present

U.S. Route 19 Truck (US 19 Truck) is a truck route of US 19 located in Western Pennsylvania in Greater Pittsburgh that has a length of 19.4 miles (31.2 km). It is a loop off US 19; the southern terminus located in Mt. Lebanon and the northern terminus in McCandless, connecting to US 19 at both ends. The route is notable for a large, unorthodox interchange with the Penn–Lincoln Parkway (I-376/US 22/US 30) just west of the Fort Pitt Tunnel, where the route joins the Parkway and forms several wrong-way concurrencies, including one with its own opposing directions. The road then joins I-279 on its northward trek. The route exits parkway north at exit 4. Heading north past Pittsburgh, the road heads past shopping buildings, Ross Park Mall, and McCandless Crossing. North of Pittsburgh, US 19 Truck is called McKnight Road, and, south of Pittsburgh, it carries West Liberty Avenue and Washington Road.

== Harlansburg truck route ==
U.S. Route 19 Truck
- Location: Harlansburg, Pennsylvania
- Existed: 2013–present

U.S. Route 19 Truck (US 19 Truck) is a truck route around a weight-restricted bridge over a branch of the Slippery Rock Creek on which trucks over 32 short tons (29 t; 29 long tons) are prohibited. The route follows Pennsylvania Route 108 (PA 108), PA 388, PA 168, and PA 956. The route was signed in 2013.

== See also ==
- List of special routes of the United States Numbered Highway System
