= U.S. Route 23 in North Carolina =

Segment of American highway

U.S. Highway 23
- US 23 highlighted in red

Route information
- Maintained by NCDOT
- Length: 106.2 mi (170.9 km)
- Existed: 1930–present

Major junctions
- South end: US 23 / US 441 / SR 15 at the Georgia state line near Dillard, GA
- US 64 in Franklin; US 74 / US 441 near Dillsboro; US 19 in Lake Junaluska; I-40 / US 74 / US 74A in Asheville; Future I-26 / I-240 / US 70 / US 74A in Asheville; US 25 / US 70 in Weaverville; US 19 / US 23A near Mars Hill
- North end: I-26 / US 23 at the Tennessee state line near Flag Pond, TN

Location
- Country: United States
- State: North Carolina
- Counties: Macon, Jackson, Haywood, Buncombe, Madison

Highway system
- United States Numbered Highway System; List; Special; Divided; North Carolina Highway System; Interstate; US; State; Scenic
| ← NC 22 | → NC 24 |

U.S. Route 23 (US 23) in North Carolina is a north–south United States Numbered Highway that runs for 106 miles (171 km) from the Georgia state line, near Dillard, to the Tennessee state line, near Flag Pond.

== Route description ==
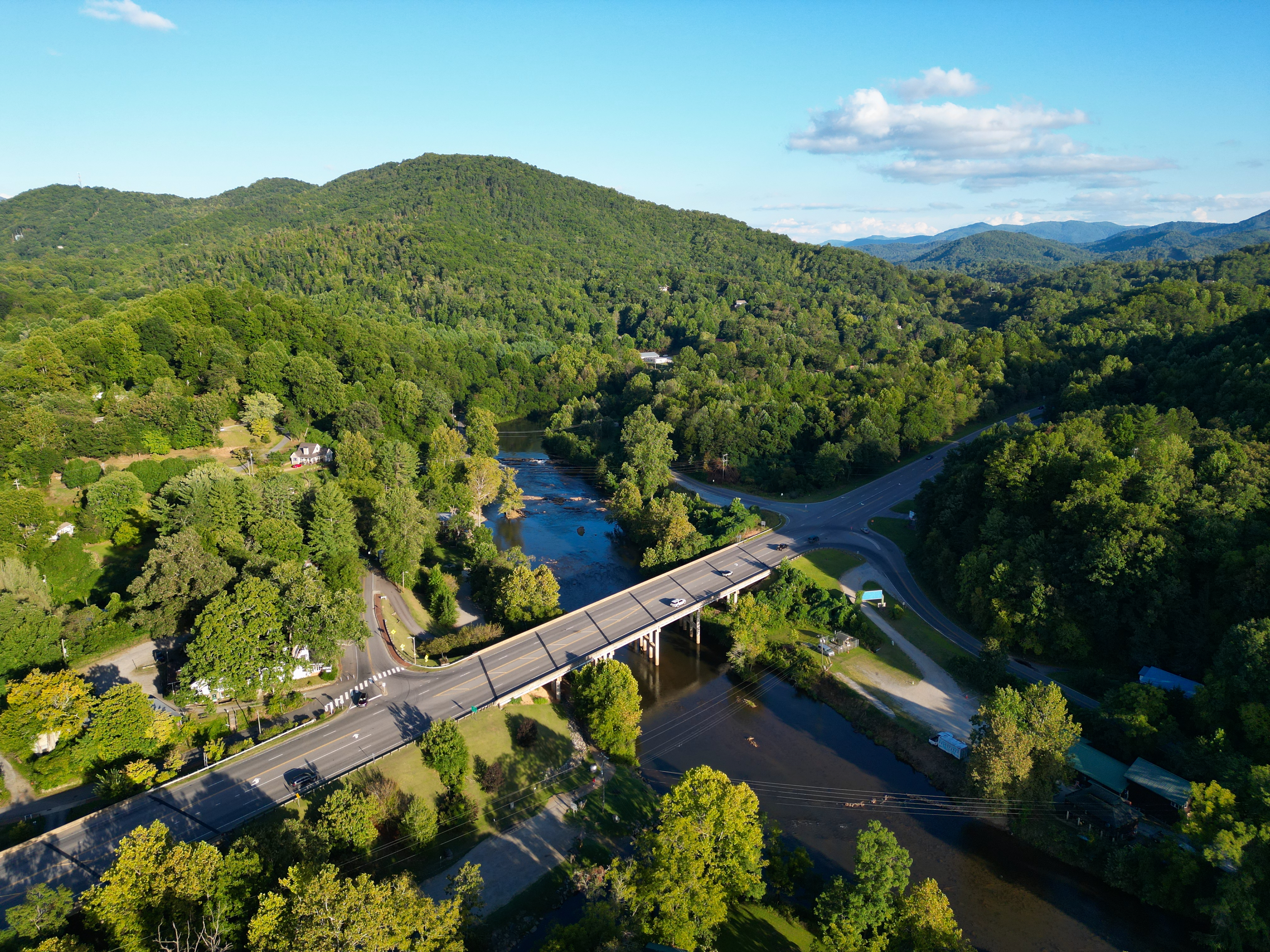
US 23 crosses the Tuckasegee River in Dillsboro, North Carolina

From the Georgia state line, with US 441, it goes through the communities of Norton and Otto before reaching Franklin, where it bypasses the city to its east. Continuing north into Jackson County, it reaches the Great Smoky Mountains Expressway in Dillsboro, where it switches partners from US 441 to US 74. Going east, it bypasses Sylva and Waynesville; in Clyde, it switches partners again from US 74 to US 19 as it goes through downtown Clyde and Canton, parallel to Interstate 40 (I-40)/US 74.

In Asheville, it connects with I-26/I-240 while crossing the French Broad River; it then continues northbound with I-26/US 19/US 70. US 23 stays in concurrency with I-26 to the Tennessee state line. Almost the entire route is four lanes, the exception being between Canton and Candler.

US 23 also make up part of Corridor A and Corridor B in the Appalachian Development Highway System (ADHS). Corridor A connects I-285, in Sandy Springs, Georgia, to I-40, near Clyde, North Carolina; it overlaps 46 miles (74 km) of US 23. Corridor B connects I-40, in Asheville, North Carolina, with US 23, near Lucasville, Ohio, it overlaps 28 miles (45 km) of US 23. ADHS provides additional funds, as authorized by Congress, which have enabled US 23 to benefit from the successive improvements along its routing in both corridors. The white-on-blue banner "Appalachian Highway" is used to mark the ADHS corridor.

=== Dedicated and memorial names ===
US 23 in North Carolina has three dedicated or memorialized sections of highway.

- Great Smoky Mountains Expressway – official name of US 23, on sections that overlap with US 74 in Haywood and Jackson counties (approved on September 16, 1983).
- Liston B. Ramsey Freeway – official name of US 23, on the section that overlaps with I-26 in Madison.
- Morris L. McGough Freeway – official name of I-26/US 19/US 23 from I-240 to the Buncombe–Madison county line (approved on April 4, 2002).

=== Scenic byways ===
US 23 is part of one scenic byway in the state (indicated by a Scenic Byways sign).

I-26 Scenic Byway is a nine-mile (14 km) byway from the Tennessee state line to exit 9 (US 19/US 23A), near Mars Hill. US 23, in concurrency with I-26, traverses the entire length, known for its unspoiled views of the North Carolina mountains.

== History ==
Established in 1930, it entered from Georgia and followed a similar route as the route today to Enka. In Asheville, it went along route Haywood Street across the French Broad River to Jefferson Drive to Patton Drive to Broadway then finally Merrimon Avenue north and out of the city. Going through Weaverville, it continued its concurrency with US 19 till Bald Creek, where it went north with US 19W into Tennessee.

By 1932, US 23 was rerouted in Asheville to use Haywood Street to Clingman Avenue to Hilliard Avenue to Biltmore Avenue which turns into Broadway. By 1937, US 23 was rerouted again, using Clingman Avenue to Patton Avenue to College Street to Biltmore Avenue. Between 1939–1944, US 23 was rerouted in Waynesville to use US 276/Russ Street to Walnut Street back to US 23 Business (US 23 Bus.). The old Main Street routing became US 19A/US 23A. In 1949, US 23 was moved west onto new bypass (Patton Avenue) around western Asheville, leaving US 23A (later US 23 Bus.). In 1952, US 23 was rerouted north of Mars Hill, replacing North Carolina Highway 36 into Tennessee. In 1961, US 23 was removed from downtown Asheville and placed on the East–West Expressway, however continuing north on Merrimon Avenue. In 1966, it was placed on new freeway east, bypassing Weaverville; then, in 1973, it was removed from Merrimon Avenue onto freeway.

In 1968, US 23 was placed on new freeway bypass west of Waynesville, leaving US 23 Bus. through town. In 1974, US 23 bypassed Franklin to the east, its old route is signed today as US 441 Bus. Also in the same year, Sylva was bypassed to the north, leaving US 23 Bus. following the old route through town.

In 2006, US 23 moved onto I-26, north of Mars Hill, leaving US 23A following the old route through northern Madison County.

== Future ==
US 19/US 23, from Canton to Candler, is to be widened to a multilane highway and its bridge replaced over the Pigeon River. This project is currently funded.

US 23, in concurrency with I-26 and US 19, is planned to be realigned onto a new interchange at I-240 and freeway improvements north from it. Right-of-way purchases are to begin in 2023; however, the project is unfunded.

== Junction list ==
| County | Location | mi | km | Exit | Destinations | Notes |
|---|---|---|---|---|---|---|
| Macon | Norton | 0.0 | 0.0 | | US 23 south / US 441 south / SR 15 south – Dillard, Clayton | Continuation into Georgia |
| Macon | Franklin | 12.3 | 19.8 | | US 64 west / US 441 Bus. north – Franklin, Murphy | West end of US 64 overlap |
| Macon | Franklin | 14.4 | 23.2 | | US 64 east / NC 28 (Highlands Road) – Franklin, Highlands | East end of US 64 overlap |
| Macon | Franklin | 15.7 | 25.3 | | US 441 Bus. west (Main Street) – Franklin | |
| Jackson | | 29.1 | 46.8 | | NC 116 east (Webster Road) – Webster | Superstreet intersection, southbound must u-turn first |
| Jackson | Dillsboro | 31.8 | 51.2 | | US 23 Bus. north (Haywood Road) – Dillsboro, Sylva | |
| Jackson | Dillsboro | 32.4 | 52.1 | 81 | US 74 west / US 441 north (Great Smoky Mountains Expressway) – Cherokee, Bryson City | West end of US 74 and north end of US 441 overlap |
| Jackson | Sylva | 34.4 | 55.4 | 83 | Grindstaff Cove Road – Sylva | |
| Jackson | Sylva | 36.5 | 58.7 | 85 | US 23 Bus. to NC 107 – Sylva | To Western Carolina University |
| Haywood | Balsam | 45.3 | 72.9 | | Blue Ridge Parkway | |
| Haywood | Waynesville | 49.6 | 79.8 | 98 | US 23 Bus. – Waynesville | |
| Haywood | Waynesville | 50.8 | 81.8 | 100 | Hazelwood Avenue | |
| Haywood | Waynesville | 52.8 | 85.0 | 102 | US 276 – Waynesville, Brevard, Maggie Valley | Northbound signed exits 102A (south) and 102B (north) |
| Haywood | Lake Junaluska | 54.5 | 87.7 | 103 | US 19 south – Maggie Valley, Cherokee | South end of US 19 overlap; southbound exit and northbound entrance |
| Haywood | Lake Junaluska | 55.1 | 88.7 | 104 | US 23 Bus. / NC 209 – Lake Junaluska, Waynesville, Hot Springs | |
| Haywood | Lake Junaluska | 56.4 | 90.8 | 105 | West Jones Cove | No southbound entrance |
| Haywood | Clyde | 57.1 | 91.9 | 106 | US 74 east (Great Smoky Mountains Expressway) to I-40 – Asheville, Knoxville | East end of US 74 overlap |
| Haywood | Canton | 61.3 | 98.7 | | NC 215 north (Blackwell Drive) | North end of NC 215 overlap |
| Haywood | Canton | 61.8 | 99.5 | | NC 215 south (Reed Street) | South end of NC 215 overlap |
| Haywood | Canton | 62.0 | 99.8 | | NC 110 south (Pisgah Drive) | |
| Buncombe | Candler | 71.0 | 114.3 | | NC 151 south (Pisgah Highway) | |
| Buncombe | Enka | 72.4 | 116.5 | | NC 112 east (Sand Hills Road) | |
| Buncombe | Asheville | 74.0 | 119.1 | | I-40 / US 74 / US 74A – Statesville, Knoxville | West end of US 74A overlap |
| Buncombe | Asheville | 76.5 | 123.1 | | US 19 Bus. north / US 23 Bus. north (Haywood Road) | |
| Buncombe | Asheville | 77.0 | 123.9 | | NC 63 north (Leicester Highway) – Leicester | |
| Buncombe | Asheville | 78.0 | 125.5 | 3A | Future I-26 east / I-240 west / US 19 Bus. south / US 23 Bus. south | East end of Future I-26 overlap, west end of I-240 overlap; business routes hidden at intersection |
| Buncombe | Asheville | 78.3 | 126.0 | 3B | Westgate / Resort Drive | |
| Buncombe | Asheville | 78.7 | 126.7 | | I-240 east / US 70 east / US 74A east / Patton Avenue | East end of I-240/US 70/US 74A overlap |
| Buncombe | Asheville | 79.0 | 127.1 | | Hill Street | Northbound exit and southbound entrance |
| Buncombe | Asheville | 80.5 | 129.6 | 25 | NC 251 – University of North Carolina at Asheville | |
| Buncombe | Woodfin | 81.8 | 131.6 | 24 | Elk Mountain Road – Woodfin | |
| Buncombe | Woodfin | 82.7 | 133.1 | 23 | US 25 south / US 19 Bus. north (Merrimon Avenue) – Woodfin, North Asheville | South end of US 25 overlap |
| Buncombe | Weaverville | 84.8 | 136.5 | 21 | New Stock Road – Weaverville | |
| Buncombe | Weaverville | 87.0 | 140.0 | 19 | US 25 north / US 70 west – Marshall, Weaverville | North end of US 25 and west end of US 70 overlap |
| Buncombe | Weaverville | 87.8 | 141.3 | 18 | US 19 Bus. south / Monticello Road – Weaverville | |
| Buncombe | Stocksville | 88.8 | 142.9 | 17 | Old Mars Hill Highway – Flat Creek | |
| Buncombe | Flat Creek | 91.3 | 146.9 | 15 | NC 197 – Jupiter, Barnardsville | |
| Buncombe | | 93.0 | 149.7 | 13 | Stockton Road – Forks of Ivy | |
| Madison | Mars Hill | 95.3 | 153.4 | 11 | NC 213 – Mars Hill, Marshall | |
| Madison | | 97.1 | 156.3 | 9 | US 19 north / US 23A north – Burnsville, Spruce Pine | North end of US 19 overlap; east end of I-26 and west end of Future I-26 |
| Madison | | 102.9 | 165.6 | 3 | US 23A south – Wolf Laurel | |
| Madison | | 106.2 | 170.9 | | I-26 west / US 23 north – Johnson City | Crosses through Sam's Gap; continuation into Tennessee |
1.000 mi = 1.609 km; 1.000 km = 0.621 mi: Concurrency terminus; Incomplete access

== See also ==
- Special routes of U.S. Route 23
- North Carolina Bicycle Route 2 - Concurrent with US 23 from Sylva to Balsam

U.S. Route 23
| Previous state: Georgia | North Carolina | Next state: Tennessee |
