= Flat Creek, North Carolina =

Flat Creek
- Unincorporated community
- Location within the state of North Carolina
- Coordinates: 35°45′10″N 82°32′47″W
- Country: United States
- State: North Carolina
- County: Buncombe County
- Elevation: 2,211 ft (674 m)
- Time zone: UTC-5 (Eastern (EST))
  - Summer (DST): UTC-4 (EDT)
- ZIP code: 28787
- Area code: 828
- GNIS feature ID: 985159

Flat Creek is an unincorporated community in Buncombe County, North Carolina, United States, located along Old Mars Hill Highway (SR 2207), near the Future I-26/US 19/US 23 interchange (exit 15). The community is named after Flat Creek, a tributary of the French Broad River.
