= Stocksville, North Carolina =

- Unincorporated community
- Location within the state of North Carolina
- Coordinates: 35°44′51″N 82°32′53″W
- Country: United States
- State: North Carolina
- County: Buncombe
- Elevation: 2,201 ft (671 m)
- Time zone: UTC-5 (Eastern (EST))
  - Summer (DST): UTC-4 (EDT)
- ZIP code: 28787
- Area code: 828
- GNIS feature ID: 1022796

Stocksville is an unincorporated community in Buncombe County, North Carolina, United States, located at the intersection of Old Mars Hill Highway (SR 2207) and Murphy Hill Road (SR 2134), near the I-26/US 19/US 23 interchange (exit 17). North Buncombe High School is located nearby.
