= U.S. Route 441 in North Carolina =

Highway in North Carolina

U.S. Highway 441
- US 441 highlighted in red; US 441 Business highlighted in blue

Route information
- Maintained by NCDOT
- Length: 64.5 mi (103.8 km)
- Existed: 1951–present
- Tourist routes: Newfound Gap Road Byway

Major junctions
- South end: US 23 / US 441 / SR 15 at the Georgia state line near Dillard, GA
- US 64 in Franklin; US 23 / US 74 near Dillsboro; US 19 in Cherokee
- North end: US 441 / SR 71 at the Tennessee state line in Great Smoky Mountains National Park

Location
- Country: United States
- State: North Carolina
- Counties: Macon, Jackson, Swain

Highway system
- United States Numbered Highway System; List; Special; Divided; North Carolina Highway System; Interstate; US; State; Scenic
← I-440	→ NC 461

U.S. Route 441 (US 441) is a north–south United States Highway that runs from Miami, Florida to Rocky Top, Tennessee. In the U.S. state of North Carolina, US 441 travels for 64.5 miles (103.8 km) from the Georgia state line near Dillard, Georgia to the Tennessee state line in the Great Smoky Mountains National Park. US 441 is a primary route connecting the cities of Franklin, Sylva, and Cherokee in western North Carolina. The highway runs concurrently with other U.S. highways for much of its routing in North Carolina including US 23 from the Georgia state line to Dillsboro, US 64 in Franklin, US 74 from Dillsboro to near Qualla, and US 19 in Cherokee. US 441 has two business routes in North Carolina, in Franklin and Cherokee.

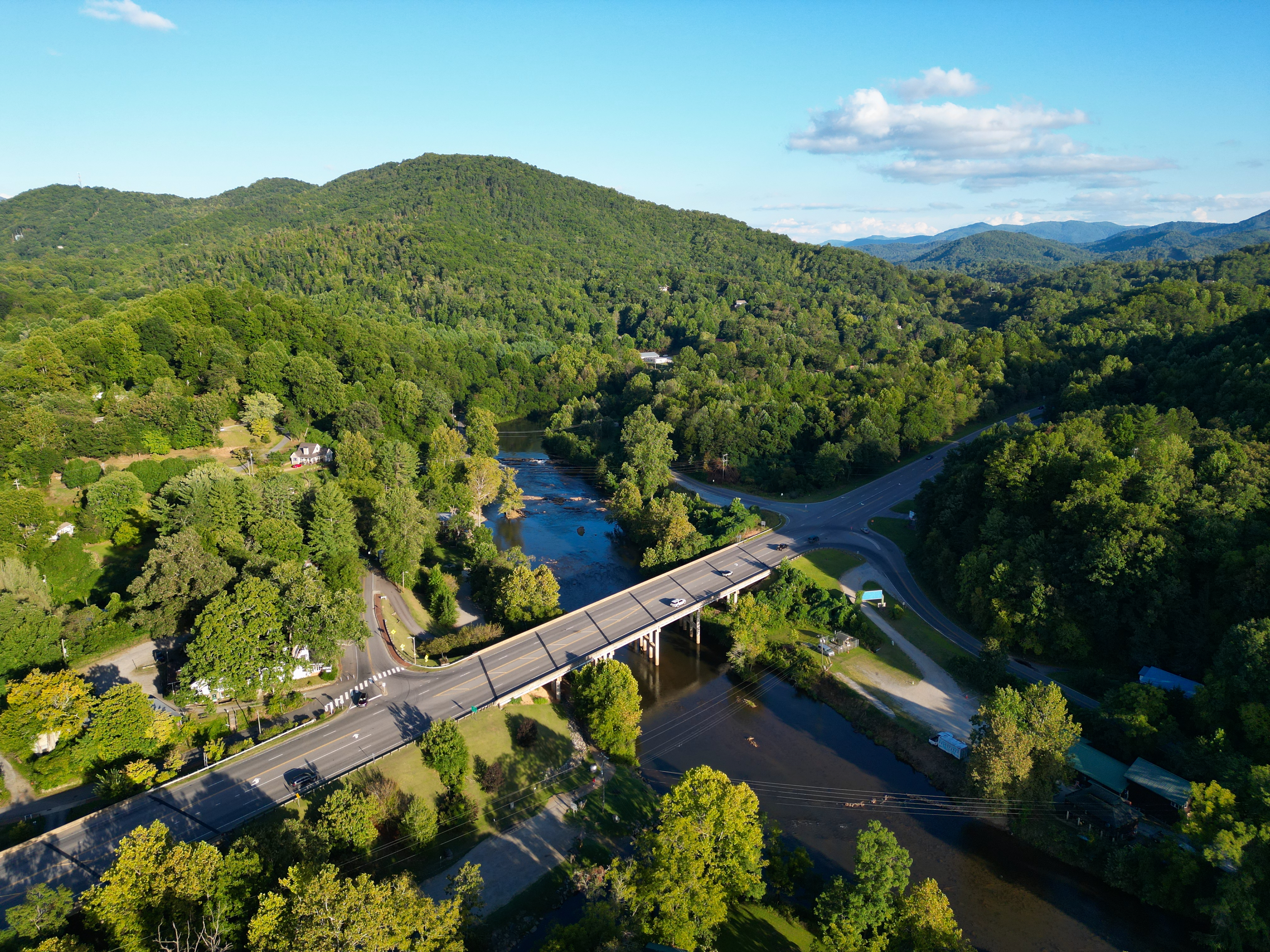
US 441 crosses the Tuckasegee River in Dillsboro

Established in 1926 between Orlando and Ocala, Florida. By 1951, US 441 had been extended north from Ocala, Florida to Baldwin, Georgia. Transportation officials in North Carolina, Tennessee, and Georgia applied to extend US 441 from Baldwin, Georgia to US 129 in Maryville, Tennessee. US 441 was extended through North Carolina in 1951 running along a relatively similar routing as today. Its extension overlaid existing highways, US 23 from Georgia to Franklin and North Carolina Highway 107 (NC 107) from Franklin to the Tennessee state line. NC 107 was truncated to Sylva in 1956, removing the concurrency. US 441 was placed on a bypass east of Franklin in 1974, with the highway's former alignment becoming US 441 Business. Later that year, the highway was placed onto a new alignment in Dillsboro, continuing to an interchange with US 19A and US 23. The routing of US 441 has remained consistent since 1975. No US 441 signage is present within the Great Smoky Mountains National Park, which was requested by the National Park Service in 1970.

== Route description ==
Upon crossing the state line from Georgia, US 23/US 441 enter the Nantahala National Forest. The concurrent routes head north through a pair of small communities before intersecting US 64 in Franklin. US 23/US 441 turn east, briefly overlapping US 64 southeast of Franklin before separating from the route and continuing to the northeast through the Cowee Mountains. After passing Dillsboro, US 23/US 441 intersect US 74 (Great Smoky Mountains Expressway); US 23 splits east towards Waynesville, while US 441 joins US 74 westbound towards Bryson City. After traversing 7 miles (11 km) along the northern banks of the Tuckasegee River, US 441 splits from US 74 and continues north into the Qualla Boundary, along Beloved Man Dr Jerry Wolfe Highway. In Cherokee, US 441 shares a short one-half-mile (0.80 km) concurrency with US 19, then continues north along the west bank of the Oconaluftee River. After entering the Great Smoky Mountains National Park, US 441 connects to the southern terminus of the Blue Ridge Parkway. Known officially in the park as Newfound Gap Road, US 441 traverses northwesterly through park until it reaches Newfound Gap at the Tennessee state line.

US 441 within the Great Smoky Mountains National Park is maintained by the National Park Service and no commercial traffic is allowed. During the winter season, the road in the high elevation may be temporary closed due to inclement weather; signs after the park entrance and/or at the Oconaluftee Visitor Center will notify travelers/visitors on any closings or condition changes.

US 441 also makes up part of Corridor A and Corridor K in the Appalachian Development Highway System (ADHS). Corridor A connects Interstate 285 (I-285) in Sandy Springs, Georgia to I-40 near Clyde, North Carolina; it overlaps twenty miles (32 km) of US 441. Corridor K connects I-75 in Cleveland, Tennessee with US 23 in Dillsboro; it overlaps seven miles (11 km) of US 441. ADHS provides additional funds, as authorized by the United States Congress, which have enabled US 441 to benefit from the successive improvements along its routing in both corridors. The white-on-blue banner "Appalachian Highway" is used to mark the ADHS corridor.

== History ==
US 441 was originally established as an original United States Numbered Highway travelling completely within the state of Florida between Orlando and Ocala. By 1951, US 441 had been extended north from Ocala, Florida to Baldwin, Georgia. Transportation officials in North Carolina, Tennessee, and Georgia applied to extend US 441 from Baldwin, Georgia to US 129 in Lake City, Tennessee. In 1951, the request was approved by the American Association of State Highway Officials (AASHO) in 1951, officially extending the highway into North Carolina. The new routing of US 441 ran concurrently with US 23 from Baldwin through Georgia and into North Carolina. In North Carolina, the new routing of US 441 was placed in concurrency with US 23 between the Georgia state line and Dillsboro. US 441 also followed along a one mile (1.6 km) concurrency with US 64 east of Franklin. Northwest of Dillsboro, US 441 was placed concurrently with US 19A for nine miles (14 km) parallel to the Tuckasegee River. US 441 then replaced NC 107 from US 19A through Cherokee and the Great Smoky Mountains National Park to the Tennessee state line where it continued towards Gatlinburg.

In 1970, the National Park Service requested, and subsequently approved, that US 441 shields be discontinued through the Great Smoky Mountains National Park. In 1974, US 23/US 441 was placed on new bypass east of Franklin; its old alignment through Franklin became US 441 Business (US 441 Bus.). In Dillsboro, US 441 was placed on new alignment continuing north from Haywood Road onto new interchange with US 19A/US 23; its old alignment along Haywood Road was downgraded to secondary road.

No major changes have been made since the mid-1970s, however modernizing improvements have been made including the construction of additional lanes and full interchanges at major intersections along its route.

== Junction list ==
County	Location	mi	km	Exit	Destinations	Notes
Macon		0.0	0.0		US 23 south / US 441 south / SR 15 south – Dillard, Clayton	Georgia line
Macon	Franklin	12.3	19.8	67	US 64 west / US 441 Bus. north – Franklin, Murphy	West end of US 64 overlap
Macon	Franklin	14.4	23.2	69	US 64 east / NC 28 (Highlands Road) – Franklin, Highlands	East end of US 64 overlap
Macon	Franklin	15.7	25.3		US 441 Bus. west (Main Street) – Franklin	
Jackson		29.1	46.8		NC 116 east (Webster Road) – Webster	Superstreet intersection, southbound must u-turn first
Jackson	Dillsboro	31.8	51.2		US 23 Bus. north (Haywood Road) – Dillsboro, Sylva	
Jackson	Dillsboro	32.4	52.1	81	US 23 north / US 74 east (Great Smoky Mountains Expressway) – Waynesville, Asheville	North end of US 23 and east end of US 74 overlap
Jackson		40.1	64.5	74	US 74 west (Great Smoky Mountains Expressway) – Bryson City	West end of US 74 overlap
Jackson	Indian Hills	43.7	70.3		US 441 Bus. north (Casino Trail) – Cherokee	
Swain	Cherokee	45.0	72.4		US 19 south (Tsalagi Road) – Bryson City, Murphy	South end of US 19 overlap
Swain	Cherokee	45.5	73.2		US 19 north / US 441 Bus. south (Tsalagi Road) – Maggie Valley, Asheville	North end of US 19 overlap
Swain	Ravensford	48.3	77.7		Blue Ridge Parkway	
Newfound Gap		64.5	103.8		US 441 north / SR 71 north – Gatlinburg	Tennessee state line
1.000 mi = 1.609 km; 1.000 km = 0.621 mi: Concurrency terminus

== Special routes ==
=== Franklin business loop ===
U.S. Highway 441 Business
- Location: Franklin, North Carolina
- Length: 2.8 mi (4.5 km)
- Existed: 1974–present

U.S. Route 441 Business (US 441 Bus), established in 1974, is a 2.7-mile (4.3 km) business route that traverses through downtown Franklin via Porter Street, Palmer Street, and Main Street. A couple of months after its initial establishment, it was adjusted in the downtown area along the one-way streets.

The entire route is in Franklin, Macon County.

mi	km	Destinations	Notes
0.0	0.0	US 23 / US 64 / US 441 – Sylva, Murphy, Clayton, Atlanta	
1.1	1.8	NC 28 north (Porter Street) – Bryson City	North end of NC 28 overlap
2.1	3.4	NC 28 south (Highlands Road) – Highlands	South end of NC 28 overlap
2.8	4.5	US 23 / US 441 – Sylva, Clayton	
1.000 mi = 1.609 km; 1.000 km = 0.621 mi: Concurrency terminus

=== Cherokee business loop ===
U.S. Highway 441 Business
- Location: Cherokee, North Carolina
- Length: 1.9 mi (3.1 km)
- Existed: 1988–present

U.S. Route 441 Business (US 441 Bus), established in 1988, is a 1.9-mile (3.1 km) business route that traverses through downtown Cherokee via Casino Trail, Paint Town Road, and Tsalagi Road. The business route was established as a new routing through the downtown area; today it provides a direct route to Harrah's Cherokee.

County	Location	mi	km	Destinations	Notes
Jackson	Indian Hills	0.0	0.0	US 441 – Sylva, Bryson City	
Jackson	Cherokee	4.5	7.2	US 19 north (Paint Town Road) – Maggie Valley, Asheville	North end of US 19 overlap
Swain	Cherokee	5.5	8.9	US 19 south / US 441 – Bryson City, Murphy, Great Smoky Mts National Park	South end of US 19 overlap
1.000 mi = 1.609 km; 1.000 km = 0.621 mi: Concurrency terminus

== See also ==
U.S. Route 441
Previous state: Georgia	North Carolina	Next state: Tennessee
