= U.S. Route 19 in North Carolina =

Segment of American highway

U.S. Highway 19
- US 19 highlighted in red

Route information
- Maintained by NCDOT
- Length: 145 mi (233 km)
- Existed: 1927–present
- Tourist routes: Mountain Waters Scenic Byway; Nantahala Byway; Mount Mitchell Scenic Drive

Major junctions
- South end: US 19 / US 129 / SR 11 at the Georgia state line at Bellview
- I-40 / US 74 in Asheville; I-26 / I-240 in Asheville
- North end: US 19E / US 19W at Cane River

Location
- Country: United States
- State: North Carolina
- Counties: Cherokee, Macon, Swain, Jackson, Haywood, Buncombe, Madison, Yancey

Highway system
- United States Numbered Highway System; List; Special; Divided; North Carolina Highway System; Interstate; US; State; Scenic
| ← NC 18 | → US 19E |

U.S. Highway 19 (US 19) traverses 145 miles (233 km) across Western North Carolina; from the Georgia state line, at the community of Bellview, to Cane River, where US 19 splits into US 19E and US 19W, which take separate routes into Tennessee.

== Route description ==
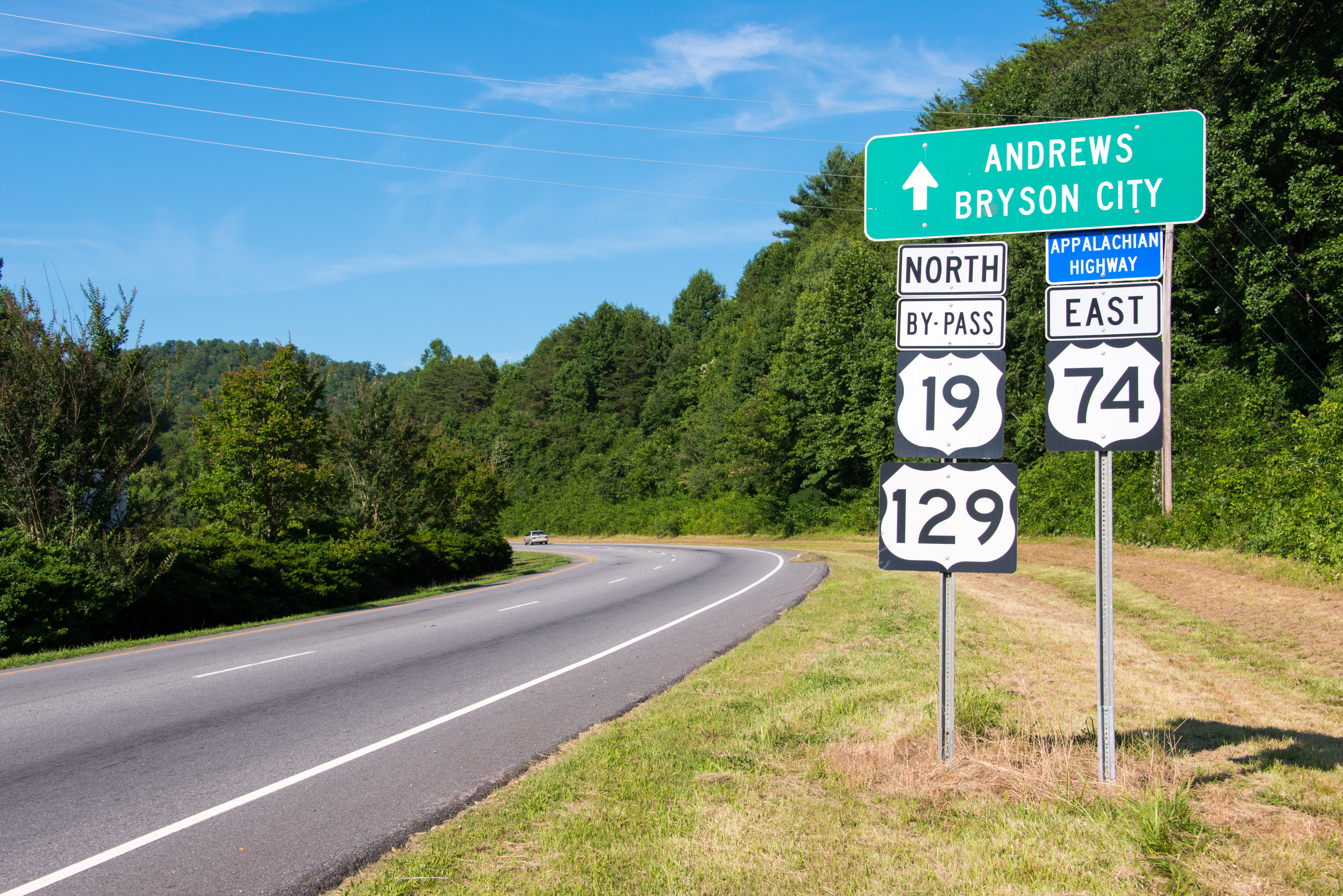
US 19/US 74/US 129 (Corridor K), in Murphy

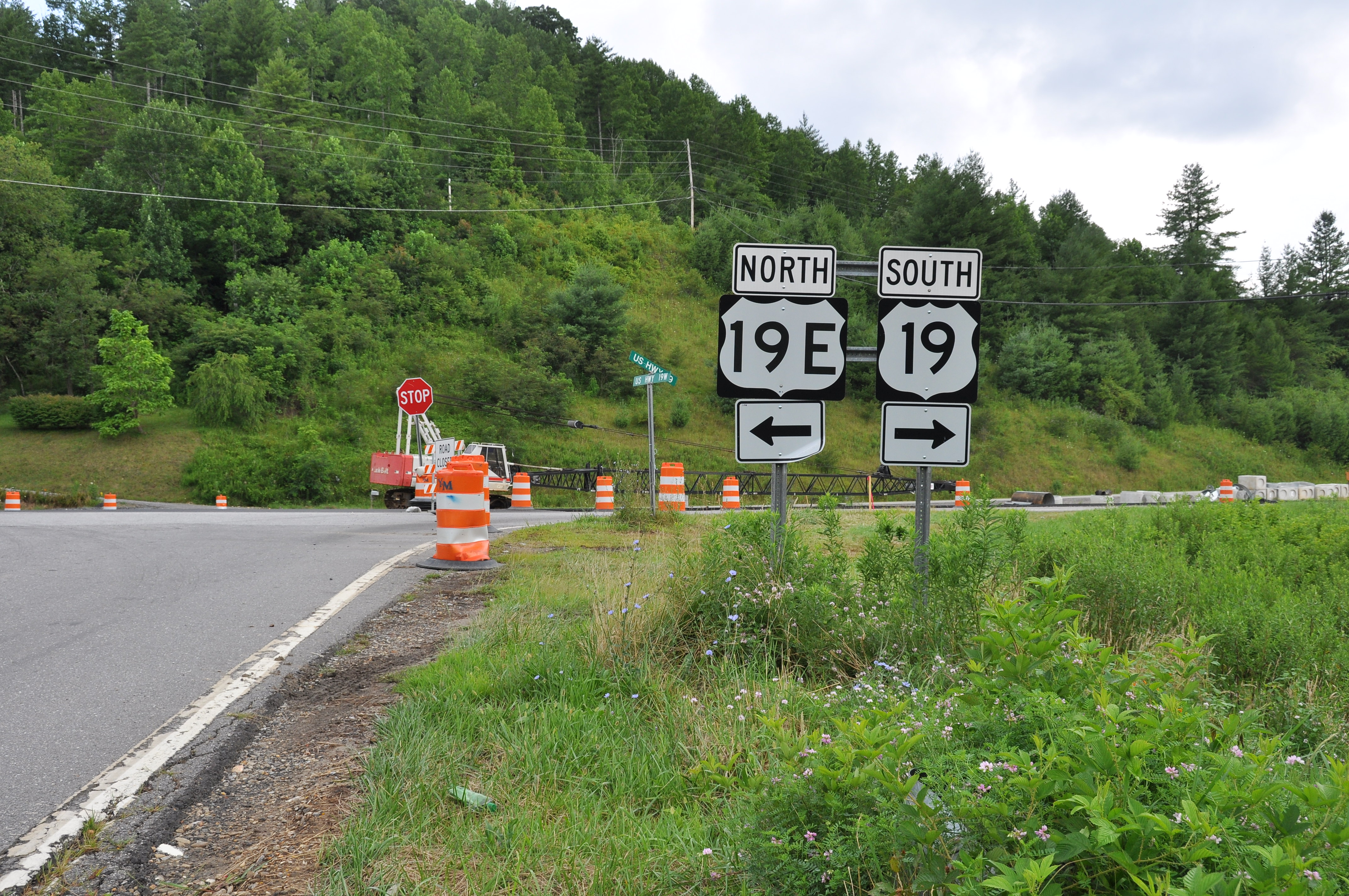
US 19/US 19E switch at Cane River

US 19 enters North Carolina at the Georgia state line overlapped with US 129 and continues toward Cherokee as Lee Highway. Four miles (6.4 km) into North Carolina, it joins with US 64/US 74 in Ranger. From Ranger to Andrews, the highway is a four-lane expressway that bypasses all the towns and communities along its route. After Andrews, US 19 reverts to two-lane through the Nantahala Gorge, which both have a scenic and somewhat curvy 21-mile (34 km) route until Almond.

At the start of the Great Smoky Mountains Expressway, US 19 exits off toward the towns of Bryson City and Cherokee. At Cherokee, travelers may go north on US 441 to Great Smoky Mountains National Park or to the Blue Ridge Parkway before traveling through the rest of the Qualla Boundary.

The highway expands back into a four-lane expressway in Maggie Valley, where it then merges with the Great Smoky Mountains Expressway for three miles (4.8 km) before exiting back off toward Clyde. From here, US 19 parallels with I-40 to Asheville. US 19 joins other highways in Asheville crossing over the French Broad River, then follows I-26 to Mars Hill. At exit 9, US 19 splits from I-26/US 23; after 10 miles (16 km), US 19 splits into US 19E and US 19W at Cane River. US 19 travels a total of 145 miles (233 km) from the Georgia state line to Cane River.

US 19 also makes up part of Corridor A, Corridor B, and Corridor K in the Appalachian Development Highway System (ADHS). Corridor A connects I-285, in Sandy Springs, Georgia, to I-40, near Clyde, overlapping 2.5 miles (4.0 km) of US 19. Corridor B connects I-40, in Asheville, with US 23, near Lucasville, Ohio, overlapping 19 miles (31 km) of US 19. Corridor K connects I-75, in Cleveland, Tennessee, with US 23, in Dillsboro, overlapping 49 miles (79 km) of US 19. The ADHS provides additional funds, as authorized by Congress, which have enabled US 19 to benefit from the successive improvements along its routing through each corridor. The white-on-blue banner "Appalachian Highway" is used to mark the ADHS corridor.

=== Dedicated and memorial names ===
US 19 in North Carolina has three dedicated or memorialized sections of highway.

- Great Smoky Mountains Expressway: Official name of US 19, on sections that overlap with US 74 in Haywood County. (approved on September 16, 1983).
- Liston B. Ramsey Freeway: Official name of US 19, on the section that overlaps with I-26 in Madison County.
- Morris L. McGough Freeway: Official name of I-26/US 19/US 23 from I-240 to the Buncombe–Madison county line (approved on April 4, 2002).

=== Scenic byways ===
US 19 is part of two scenic byways in the state (indicated by a Scenic Byways sign).

Nantahala Byway is a 43-mile (69 km) byway from Marble to Whittier; it traverses along the Nantahala and Tuckasegee rivers. US 19 overlaps almost the entire route, except south and east of Bryson City. This byway also connects to the Indian Lakes Scenic Byway (at Topton and Almond via US 129 and North Carolina Highway 28, or NC 28).

Mount Mitchell Scenic Drive is a 52-mile (84 km) byway from I-26, through Burnsville, to the summit of Mount Mitchell State Park. It is known for its vistas in and around the Black Mountains. US 19 overlaps from I-26 to Micaville.

== History ==
Established in 1927, US 19 traversed from the Georgia state line (at Bellview) to the Tennessee state line (at Elk Park), roughly similar to the route seen today. In 1930, US 19 was truncated at Cane River, where it was split into US 19E and US 19W; US 19E follows the original US 19 routing north. In 1932, it was rerouted in Asheville from Haywood Road to Clingman Avenue, to Hilliard Avenue to Biltmore Avenue toward Broadway Street. In 1937, US 19 was rerouted south of Almond to its current alignment today; while it was rerouted through downtown Asheville again: from Haywood Road to Clingman Avenue to Patton Avenue to College Avenue to Biltmore Avenue toward Broadway Street.

In the 1940s, additional construction work on US 19 was assured by a compromise made with the Eastern Band of Cherokee Indians in return for right-of-way through the Qualla Boundary for the Blue Ridge Parkway.

In 1947, US 19 was rerouted from Ela, traversing through Dillsboro, Sylva, and Waynesville, to Lake Junaluska. The old route, through Cherokee and Maggie Valley became US 19A. In 1948, it was switched, having US 19 back along the original route and US 19A going south to Lake Junaluska.

In 1949, US 19 was moved onto the Smokey Park Highway/Patton Avenue as a bypass in western Asheville. The old alignment became US 19A (today's US 19 Business, or US 19 Bus.). In 1952, US 19 was rerouted off Martins Creek Road and onto Blairsville Highway, near Ranger. In 1954, US 19 was realigned to its current route from Lake Junaluska to Clyde and Canton; 0.5 miles (0.80 km) of the old route was replaced by NC 209. Between 1955–1957, US 19 was split onto one-way streets in downtown Asheville: northbound used Patton, to Market, to Woodfin, to Broadway, and southbound used Broadway to College, to Patton. In 1961, US 19 removed from downtown Asheville and put on the East–West Expressway, north at Marrimon Avenue. Between 1963–1968, US 19 was split onto one-way streets in downtown Canton (Park Street and Main Street). In 1961, US 19 was moved onto new freeway west of Weaverville; the old route became US 19 Bus.

In 1973, US 19 was removed from Marrimon Avenue to its current alignment north of Asheville. In 1975, the freeway US 19 traversed was extended from Weaverville to Mars Hill. In 1979, US 19 bypassed Andrews; US 19 Bus. replaced the old route. In 1980, US 19 bypassed Murphy; US 19 Bus. replaced the old route. In 1984, US 19 was realigned in Yancey County to its current routing and US 19W was extended 0.4 miles (0.64 km) south.

In 1982, the North Carolina Department of Transportation submitted a request to the American Association of State Highway and Transportation Officials to swap US 19 and US 19A between Bryson City and Lake Junaluska; opposition by businesses in the resort town of Maggie Valley, who opposed losing US 19, prevented this. In 1986, US 74 was extended west from Asheville to Chattanooga, Tennessee, which overlapped nearly all of the Great Smoky Mountains Expressway, via US 19 and US 19 Bypass (US 19 Byp.); the following year, US 19 Byp. was decommissioned in favor of US 74.

On November 2, 2012, US 19/US 19E was widened from I-26 to Jacks Creek Road, just west of Burnsville. At $107.9 million (equivalent to $142 million in 2023), the 13.6-mile (21.9 km) two-lane mountain road was upgraded to a four-lane highway, and the first for Yancey County. Governor Bev Perdue was on hand at the ribbon-cutting ceremony opening the highway.

== Future ==
US 19/US 74, from Andrews to Almond, is to be realigned onto a new multilane highway west of the Nantahala Gorge. The project is broken into several sections, all subject to reprioritization.

US 19/US 23, from Canton to Candler, is to be widened to a multilane highway and its bridge replaced over the Pigeon River. This project is currently funded.

US 19, in concurrency with I-26 and US 23, is planned to be realigned onto a new interchange at I-240 and freeway improvements north from it. Right-of-way purchases are to begin in 2023; however, the project is unfunded.

Two bridges over Richland Creek are planned to be replaced in Lake Junaluska, and the interchange with US 23/US 74 is to be redesigned to make it safer.

== Junction list ==
| County | Location | mi | km | Exit | Destinations | Notes |
|---|---|---|---|---|---|---|
| Cherokee | Bellview | 0.0 | 0.0 | | US 19 south / US 129 south / SR 11 south – Blairsville | Georgia state line |
| Cherokee | Ranger | 4.0 | 6.4 | | US 64 west / US 74 west – Cleveland | West end of US 64/74 overlap |
| Cherokee | Murphy | 9.0 | 14.5 | | US 19 Bus. north (Hiwassee Street) | |
| Cherokee | Murphy | 9.5 | 15.3 | | US 64 east – Hayesville, Franklin | East end of US 64 overlap |
| Cherokee | | 12.0 | 19.3 | | US 19 Bus. south (Pleasant Valley Road) | |
| Cherokee | Marble | 18.0 | 29.0 | | NC 141 south | |
| Cherokee | Andrews | 23.5 | 37.8 | | US 19 Bus. north (Main Street) / Airport Road – Western Carolina Regional Airport | |
| Cherokee | Andrews | 26.5 | 42.6 | | US 19 Bus. south (Main Street) | |
| Cherokee | Topton | 33.5 | 53.9 | | US 129 north (Tallulah Road) – Robbinsville | North end of US 129 overlap |
| Macon | No major junctions | | | | | |
| Swain | Almond | 48.0 | 77.2 | | NC 28 north – Robbinsville, Fontana | North end of NC 28 overlap; also to Fontana Dam |
| Swain | Lauada | 51.0 | 82.1 | | NC 28 south – Franklin | South end of NC 28 overlap |
| Swain | | 53.0 | 85.3 | 64 | US 74 east (Great Smoky Mountains Expressway) – Dillsboro, Waynesville | East end of US 74 overlap |
| Swain | Bryson City | 56.3 | 90.6 | | US 19 Conn. (Veterans Boulevard) to US 74 | |
| Jackson | No major junctions | | | | | |
| Swain | Cherokee | 66.0 | 106.2 | | US 441 south – Dillsboro, Franklin, Atlanta | South end of US 441 overlap |
| Swain | Cherokee | 66.5 | 107.0 | | US 441 north / US 441 Bus. south – Blue Ridge Parkway, Great Smoky Mountains National Park | North end of US 441 and south end of US 441 Business overlap |
| Jackson | Cherokee | 67.0 | 107.8 | | US 441 Bus. south | South end of US 441 Business overlap |
| Haywood | | 78.0 | 125.5 | | Blue Ridge Parkway | |
| Haywood | Dellwood | 87.0 | 140.0 | | US 276 north (Jonathan Creek Road) | North end of US 276 overlap |
| Haywood | Lake Junaluska | 89.0 | 143.2 | | US 276 south (Russ Road) – Waynesville | South end of US 276 overlap |
| Haywood | Lake Junaluska | 90.0 | 144.8 | 103 | US 23 south / US 74 west (Great Smoky Mountains Expressway) – Waynesville, Sylva | South end of US 23 and west end of US 74 overlap, northbound exit and Southbound entrance |
| Haywood | Lake Junaluska | 91.0 | 146.5 | 104 | US 23 Bus. / NC 209 – Lake Junaluska, Waynesville, Hot Springs | |
| Haywood | Lake Junaluska | 92.0 | 148.1 | 105 | West Jones Cove | No southbound entrance |
| Haywood | Clyde | 93.0 | 149.7 | 106 | US 74 east (Great Smoky Mountains Expressway) to I-40 – Asheville, Knoxville | East end of US 74 overlap |
| Haywood | Canton | 97.0 | 156.1 | | NC 215 north (Blackwell Drive) | North end of NC 215 overlap |
| Haywood | Canton | 98.0 | 157.7 | | NC 215 south (Reed Street) | South end of NC 215 overlap |
| Haywood | Canton | 98.2 | 158.0 | | NC 110 south (Pisgah Drive) | |
| Buncombe | Candler | 107.0 | 172.2 | | NC 151 south (Pisgah Highway) | |
| Buncombe | Enka | 109.0 | 175.4 | | NC 112 east (Sand Hills Road) | |
| Buncombe | Asheville | 110.0 | 177.0 | | I-40 / US 74 / US 74A – Statesville, Knoxville | West end of US 74A overlap |
| Buncombe | Asheville | 113.0 | 181.9 | | US 19 Bus. north / US 23 Bus. north (Haywood Road) | |
| Buncombe | Asheville | 114.0 | 183.5 | | NC 63 north (Leicester Highway) – Leicester | |
| Buncombe | Asheville | 115.0 | 185.1 | | Future I-26 east / I-240 west / US 19 Bus. south / US 23 Bus. south | East end of Future I-26 overlap, west end of I-240 overlap; business routes hidden at intersection |
US 19 overlaps with Interstate 26 (exits 3A to 9).
| Madison | | 134.0 | 215.7 | | I-26 / US 23 / US 23A north – Asheville, Wolf Laurel, Johnson City | West end of I-26 overlap, north end of US 23 overlap, brief US 23A overlap |
| Yancey | Cane River | 145.0 | 233.4 | | US 19E north / US 19W north – Burnsville, Erwin | US 19 ends; US 19E and US 19W begin |
1.000 mi = 1.609 km; 1.000 km = 0.621 mi: Concurrency terminus; Incomplete access

== See also ==
- Special routes of U.S. Route 19

| Preceded by Georgia | U.S. Route 19; North Carolina | Succeeded by 19E - 19W |
