= Bellview, North Carolina =

Unincorporated community in North Carolina, United States

Coordinates: 34°59′28″N 84°04′02″W

Bellview is an unincorporated community in Cherokee County, in the U.S. state of North Carolina. It is part of Notla Township, and is located immediately north of the Georgia border, about 10 miles south of Murphy, NC. Its average elevation is 1800 feet (549 m) above sea level. U.S. Route 19 is the main highway through Bellview.

== History ==
Bellview was founded as "Bell View" and was at one time a prosperous community. Timber, pulp wood harvesting, and farming were the largest industries.

Bell View Academy was established in 1878. Baseball player Ty Cobb's grandfather, John Marshall Cobb, owned an 1861 farm house on Cobb Creek and was an early teacher at the academy. Ty Cobb visited his aunt in Bellview during the summers and played baseball in Murphy. The private part of the school closed shortly after it moved to Murphy in 1906. Public schooling continued at Bell View Academy until 1929 when it was consolidated with Brasstown and Martin's Creek schools. The Bell View Academy schoolhouse was later destroyed by fire.

US 129 from Blairsville, Georgia, to Murphy was completed through Bellview in 1934. In 2024, the N.C. Department of Transportation commenced work on a $55 million project to widen and straighten the highway. The community gained electricity in the early 1940s. The Bellview Community Center was built in 1976. The Bellview Volunteer Fire Department was founded in 1981. In 2024, the department moved from a three-bay station on Blairsville Highway to a newly built five-bay station across from the Bellview Community Center. In 2026, the fire department entered talks to merge with the Ranger Volunteer Fire Department.

== Education ==
Students in Bellview attend Martins Creek Elementary School and Martins Creek Middle School.
