= Norton, North Carolina =

- Unincorporated community
- Location within North Carolina Location within the United States
- Coordinates: 35°07′50″N 83°09′22″W
- Country: United States
- State: North Carolina
- County: Jackson
- Elevation: 3,661 ft (1,116 m)
- Time zone: UTC-5 (Eastern (EST))
  - Summer (DST): UTC-4 (EDT)
- Area code: 828
- GNIS feature ID: 1021676

Norton is an unincorporated community in Jackson County, in the U.S. state of North Carolina.

== History ==
A post office was established as Nortons in 1878, the name was changed to Norton in 1891, and the post office closed in 1953. The community was named for Dave Norton, who was credited with bringing the post office to town.
