= Cane River, North Carolina =

Cane River
- Unincorporated community
- Location within the state of North Carolina
- Coordinates: 35°54′52″N 82°23′28″W
- Country: United States
- State: North Carolina
- County: Yancey
- Elevation: 2,497 ft (761 m)
- Time zone: UTC-5 (Eastern (EST))
  - Summer (DST): UTC-4 (EDT)
- ZIP code: 28714
- Area code: 828
- GNIS feature ID: 1024887

Cane River is an unincorporated community of Yancey County, North Carolina, United States. It is located west of Burnsville, at the intersection of U.S. Routes 19, 19E and 19W, along the Cane River. Cane River Middle School and Blue Ridge Elementary School are located in the community.

The larger Cane River township encompasses the settlements of Bald Creek, Cane River, Elk Shoal, Possumtrot, and Swiss.
