= Special routes of U.S. Route 23 =

Special routes of U.S. Route 23

Highway system
- United States Numbered Highway System; List; Special; Divided

Several special routes of U.S. Route 23 (US 23) exist. There are 18 extant special routes along US 23 and 14 former routes.

== Waycross business loop ==
U.S. Highway 23 Business
- Location: Waycross, Georgia
- Length: 9.622 mi (15.485 km)
- Existed: 1996–present

U.S. Highway 23 Business (US 23 Bus.) is a 9.622-mile (15.485 km) route that goes through downtown Waycross, Georgia. It is entirely concurrent with US 1 Bus. and State Route 4 Bus. (SR 4 Bus.). It is signed primarily as US 1 Bus. Except for the far northern end, the entire length of US 23 Bus. is part of the National Highway System, a system of routes determined to be the most important for the nation's economy, mobility, and defense.

== Hazlehurst business loop ==
U.S. Highway 23 Business
- Location: Hazlehurst, Georgia
- Existed: 1987–1995

U.S. Highway 23 Business (US 23 Bus.) was a business route of US 23 that existed completely within the city limits of Hazlehurst, Georgia. It was completely concurrent with SR 19 Bus. It traveled along East Jefferson Road and then turned onto US 221/SR 135, which traveled northbound along South Cromartie Street and southbound along South Tallahassee Street until they reached US 23/US 341/SR 19/SR 27. In 1986, the path of US 23/SR 19 in the city was shifted eastward. Its former path, including the concurrent path of US 221/SR 135, was redesignated as SR 19 Bus. The next year, US 23 Bus. was established on the path of SR 19 Bus. In 1995, both US 23 Bus. and SR 19 Bus. were decommissioned. The portion not concurrent with US 221/SR 135 was redesignated as SR 135 Connector.

Major intersections
The entire route was in Hazlehurst, Jeff Davis County.

mi	km	Destinations	Notes
		US 23 / SR 19 / SR 19 Bus. begins	Southern terminus of US 23 Bus./SR 19 Bus.; south end of SR 19 Bus. concurrency
		US 221 south / SR 135 south	South end of US 221/SR 135 concurrency
		US 23 / US 221 north / US 341 / SR 19 / SR 19 Bus. ends / SR 27 / SR 135 north	Northern terminus of US 23 Bus./SR 19 Bus.; north end of SR 19 Bus. and US 221/SR 135 concurrencies
1.000 mi = 1.609 km; 1.000 km = 0.621 mi: Concurrency terminus

== Cochran business loop ==
U.S. Highway 23 Business
- Location: Cochran, Georgia
- Length: 4.1 mi (6.6 km)

U.S. Highway 23 Business (US 23 Bus.) is an at least 4.1-mile (6.6 km) route that goes through downtown Cochran, Georgia. It is entirely concurrent with SR 87 Bus.

US 23 Bus./SR 87 Bus. begins at an intersection south of Cochran and travels to the northwest. The highway crosses a railroad bridge over a Southern Railway line and becomes Southeast Second Street, traveling through the grounds of the Middle Georgia State University Cochran Campus. After leaving the vicinity of the campus, it eventually intersects SR 26 (Dykes Street), and Southeast Second Street not only becomes Northeast Second Street but is also shared in a concurrency with US 129 Alternate (US 129 Alt.) and SR 112. The vicinity is also the site of the National Register of Historic Places (NRHP)-listed Cochran Municipal Building and School and the Bleckley County Courthouse. Between East Ash Street and East Railroad Avenue, the highway curves to the northeast with that same Southern Railway line earlier flanking the west side, although the tracks begin to move away from the road north of unmarked Emergency Route 105. The business route ends at US 23/SR 87, but US 129 Alt. joins the route in a concurrency into Macon, while SR 112 travels concurrently only as far as north into Royal along the same concurrency until branching off toward Milledgeville.

== Baldwin–Cornelia business route ==
U.S. Highway 23 Business
- Location: Baldwin–Cornelia, Georgia
- Length: 3.7 mi (6.0 km)
- Existed: 1972–c. 1992

U.S. Highway 23 Business (US 23 Bus.) in Cornelia, Georgia, existed between 1972 and c. 1992, along part of SR 105.

== Dillsboro–Sylva business loop ==
U.S. Highway 23 Business
- Location: Dillsboro–Sylva, North Carolina
- Length: 3.9 mi (6.3 km)
- Existed: 1974–present

U.S. Highway 23 Business (US 23 Bus.), established in 1974, is a 3.9-mile (6.3 km) route goes through downtown Dillsboro and Sylva, North Carolina, via Haywood Road, Main Street/Mill Street, and Asheville Highway.

== Waynesville business loop ==
U.S. Highway 23 Business
- Location: Waynesville, North Carolina
- Length: 6.1 mi (9.8 km)
- Existed: 1968–present

U.S. Highway 23 Business (US 23 Bus.), established in 1968, is a 6.1-mile (9.8 km) route goes through downtown Waynesville, North Carolina, via Hyatt Creek Road, Main Street, and Asheville Road.

== Waynesville alternate route ==
U.S. Highway 23A
- Location: Waynesville, North Carolina
- Existed: 1939–1968

U.S. Highway 23A (US 23A) in Waynesville, North Carolina, existed between 1939 and 1968.

== Canton alternate route ==
U.S. Highway 23A
- Location: Canton, North Carolina
- Length: 11.1 mi (17.9 km)
- Existed: 1962–1971

U.S. Highway 23A (US 23A) near Canton, North Carolina, existed between 1962 and 1971. In its short history, it was utilized simply as a connector route to a completed section of Interstate 40 (I-40), west of Asheville.

== Asheville alternate route ==
U.S. Highway 23A
- Location: Asheville, North Carolina
- Length: 2.3 mi (3.7 km)
- Existed: 1949–1960

U.S. Highway 23A (US 23A) in Asheville, North Carolina, existed between 1949 and 1960. Today, the route is known as US 23 Bus.

== Asheville business loop ==
U.S. Highway 23 Business
- Location: Asheville, North Carolina
- Length: 2.3 mi (3.7 km)
- Existed: 1960–present

U.S. Highway 23 Business (US 23 Bus.), established in 1960, is a 2.3-mile (3.7 km) business route (cosigned with US 19 Bus.) currently starts on Haywood Road then go north on I-26/I-240 (exit 2) back to the main US 23 (exit 3). Historically, US 23 Bus. continued along Haywood Road, connecting to Clingman Avenue and then to Patton Avenue/US 23. In 1961, it extended over Patton Avenue through downtown Asheville when US 23 moved onto the East–West Freeway. In 1962, it was rerouted to its current alignment from Haywood Road to Hanover Street (now I-26/I-240).

== Weaverville business route ==
U.S. Highway 23 Business
- Location: Weaverville, North Carolina

== Wolf Laurel alternate route ==
U.S. Highway 23A
- Location: Wolf Laurel, North Carolina
- Length: 8 mi (13 km)
- Existed: 2006–present

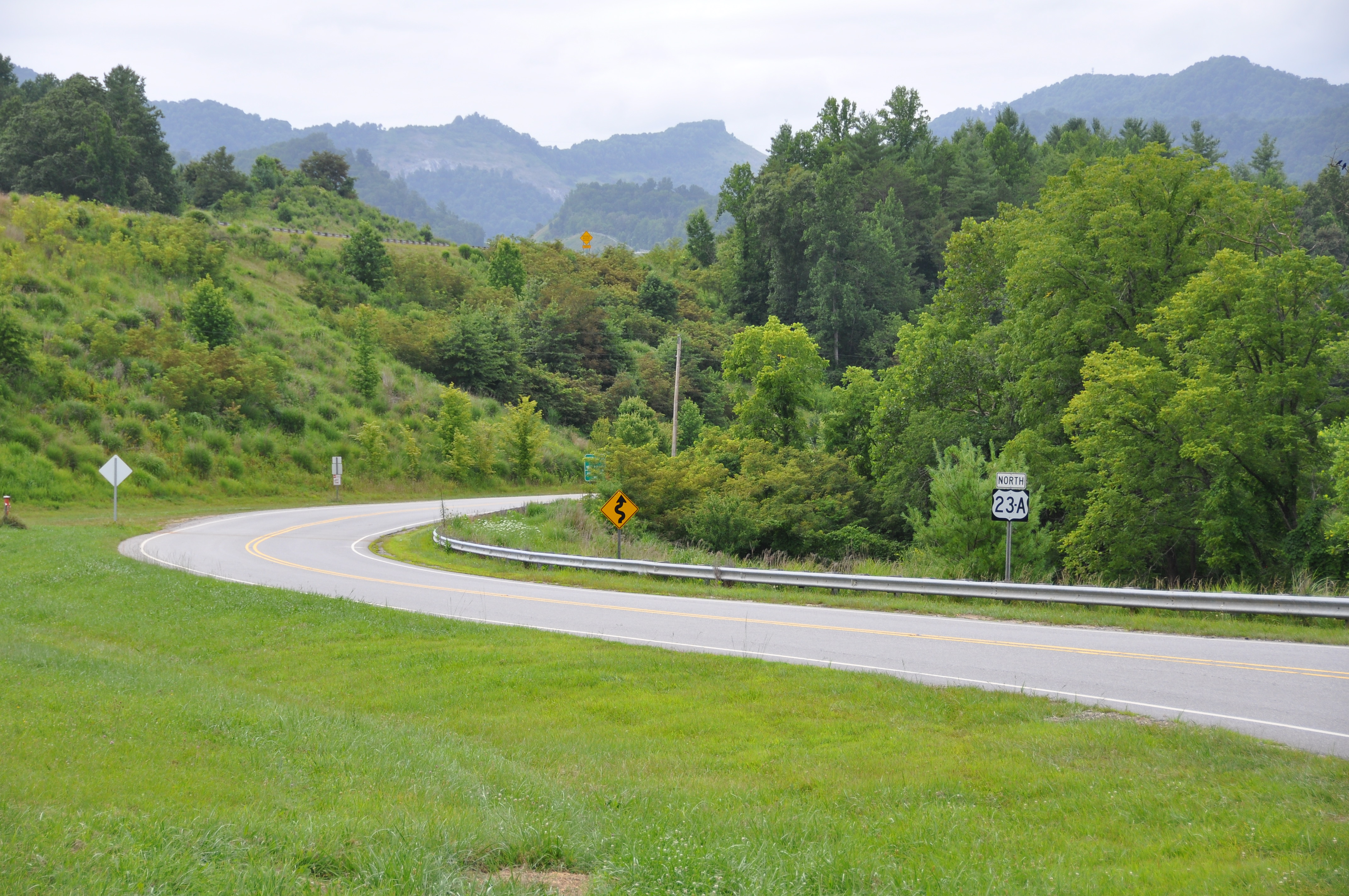
US 23A near Mars Hill

U.S. Highway 23A (US 23A), established in 2006, is an eight-mile (13 km) route follows the old US 23 route through northern Madison County, North Carolina. Starting at the exit 9 interchange from I-26/US 23, it briefly links with US 19 before taking a left turn toward Tennessee. There is no control city for the route as it only connects the communities of California, Faust, and access to the Wolf Laurel gated community and ski resort. The route reunites with I-26/US 23 at the exit 3 interchange. Signage of this alternate route goes by an "A" right of number instead of "ALT" or "Alternate" banner on top (this is the same style used by other alternate routes in Western North Carolina).

== Gate City business loop ==
U.S. Route 23 Business
- Location: Gate City, Virginia
- Length: 2.6 mi (4.2 km)

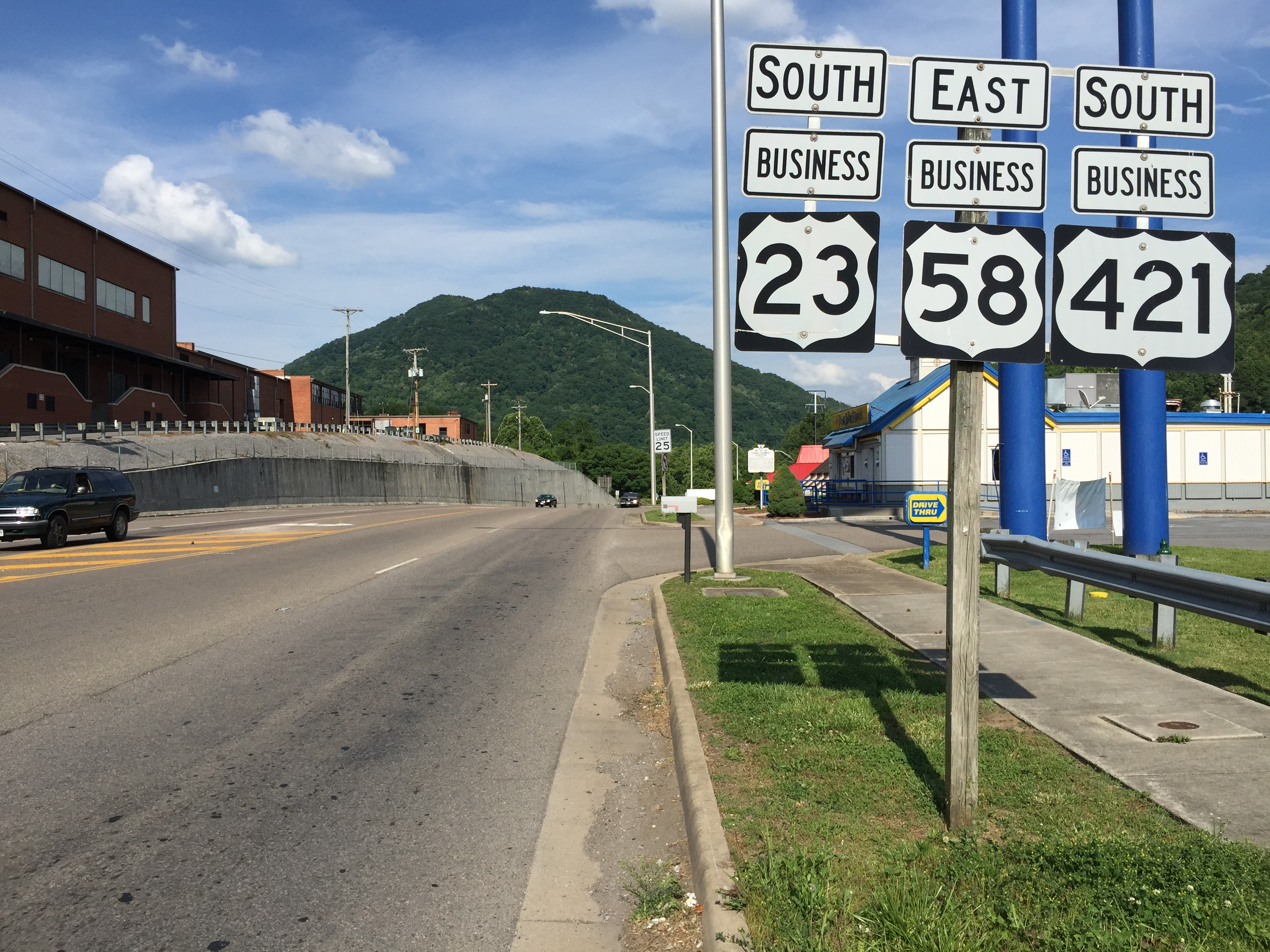
US 23 Bus./US 58 Bus./US 421 Bus. in Gate City

U.S. Route 23 Business (US 23 Bus.) is a business route of US 23 in Scott County, Virginia. The business route is coexistent with US 58 Bus. and US 421 Bus. through Gate City.

== Big Stone Gap–Norton business loop ==
U.S. Route 23 Business
- Location: Big Stone Gap–Norton, Virginia
- Length: 16.0 mi (25.7 km)
- Tourist routes: Virginia Byway

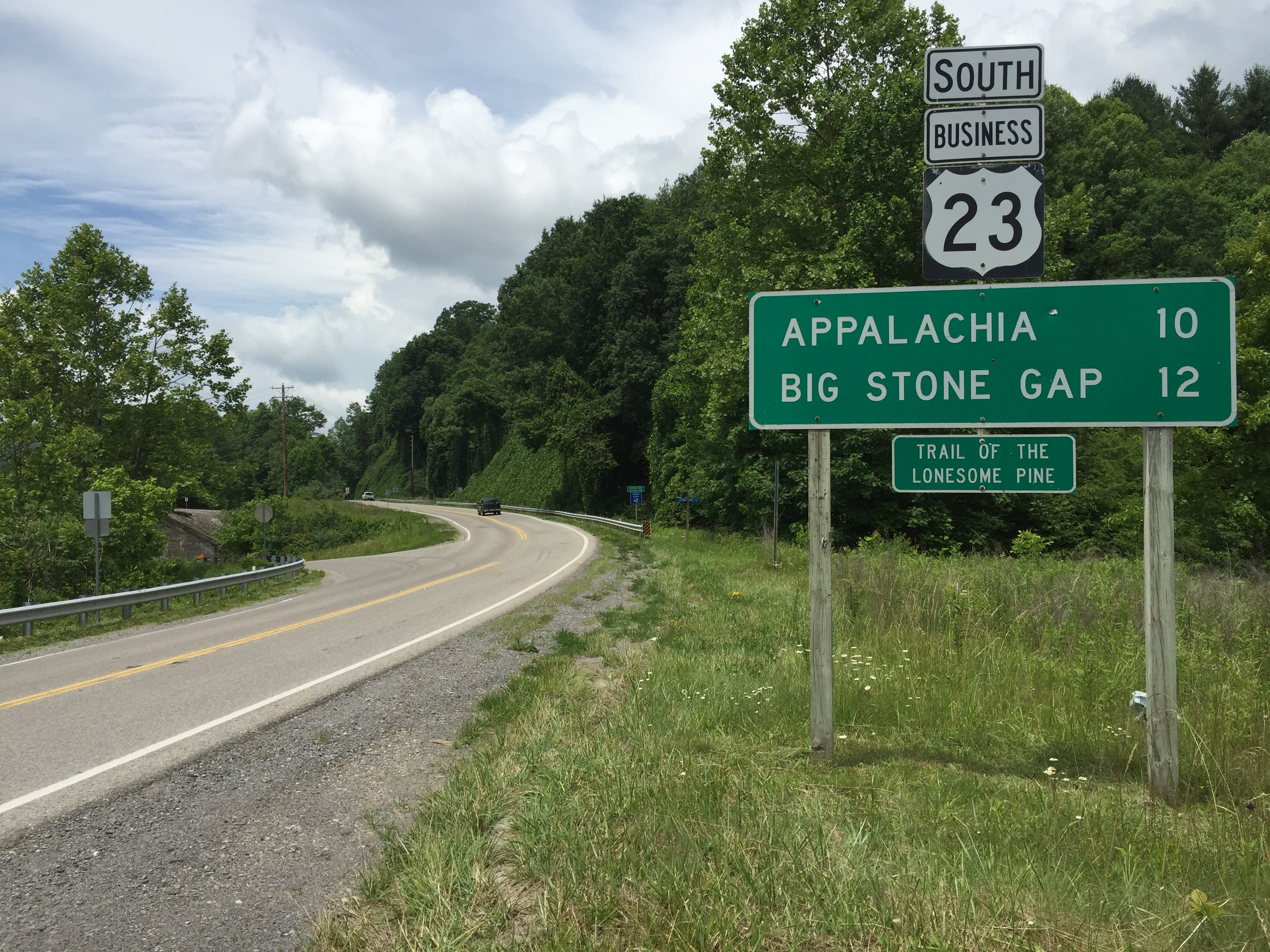
US 23 Bus. southbound at SR 610 just southwest of Norton

U.S. Route 23 Business (US 23 Bus.) is a 16-mile (26 km) business route of US 23 between Big Stone Gap and Norton, Virginia.

US 23 Bus. begins in Big Stone Gap at an interchange along mainline US 23 with US 58 Alt. and State Route 844 (SR 844), the former of which joins US 23 in an overlap until it reaches Norton northbound US 23 Bus. and westbound US 58 Alt. wind around Gilley Avenue East until it reaches East 5th Street South, then turns north. At Wood Avenue East (SR 610), US 58 Alt. turns west, ending the concurrency, and the name changes to East 5th Street North. The route crosses a bridge over the Powell River then after passing a local car dealership across from East 5th Avenue becomes Roaring Branch Road. Most of this mountainous road winds around the Powell River, Norfolk Southern Railway's Appalachia District, and an abandoned Louisville and Nashville Railroad line currently in the process of being converted into a rail trail. The route turns more towards the east as it enters Appalachia, where it is renamed West Main Street, and serves as the eastern terminus for SR 68. The road name is changed to East Main Street after the southern terminus of SR 78 a bridge over Norfolk Southern Railway's Clinch Valley Extension, and then follows the rest of the line east. Leaving town, the road is named Kent Junction Road, and at SR 603 where it passes a bridge over the junction the road was named for which also contains the Paradise Branch. The street name still remains after passing this junction, and, along the way, it passes the Central Drive-In Theatre just before passing through Blackwood.

Descending from the mountains, the area becomes slightly more developed as it passes by the NRHP-listed Country Cabin community center, and through a forgotten unincorporated community named Josephine. East of SR 621, the route officially enters Norton, and the street is named Park Avenue Northwest. Within downtown Norton, the road encounters US 58 Alt. Bus. at 11th Street Southwest and is joined by that route in an overlap. Continuing to run straight east through the city, it encounters the western terminus of SR 74 at Coeburn Avenue Southwest, which runs southeast of the routes. East of SR 74, the routes climb an embankment and becomes a divided highway, though the US 23 Bus./US 58 Alt. Bus. overlap is about to come to an end. Just before the interchange with mainline US 23, US 58 Alt. Bus. continues east straight ahead along unmarked SR 283 (Norton Coeburn Road) while US 23 and Park Avenue Northeast make a sharp turn to the north. From this point on, the route is a two-lane highway with a continuous center left-turn lane, winding around the west side of the Guest River, and Norfolk Southern Railway's Glamorgan Branch. Snaking closer to the railroad and the river, it leaves the Norton city limits at the intersection with SR 620 and the Glamorgan Branch at the same time, just before crossing a bridge over the Guest River where the street is named Esserville Road. US 23 Bus. ends at the intersection of US 23 across from SR 757 (Wise–Norton Road).

== Wise business loop ==
U.S. Route 23 Business
- Location: Wise, Virginia
- Length: 2.8 mi (4.5 km)
- Tourist routes: Virginia Byway

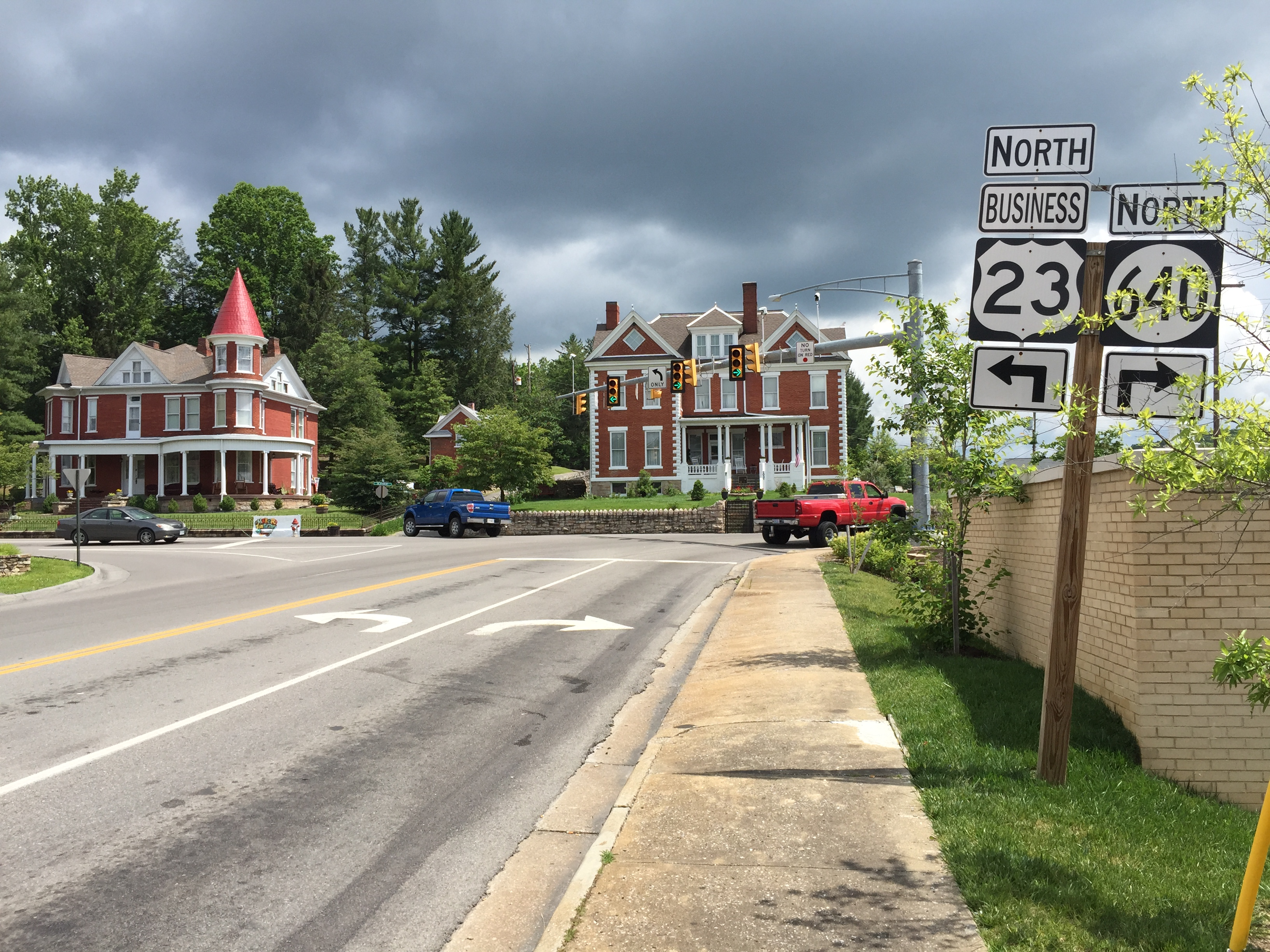
US 23 Bus. northbound at SR 640 in Wise

U.S. Route 23 Business (US 23 Bus.) is a business route of US 23 in the Wise, Virginia. The route runs along Norton Road and West Main Street.

== Pound business loop ==
U.S. Route 23 Business
- Location: Pound, Virginia
- Length: 3.1 mi (5.0 km)
- Tourist routes: Virginia Byway

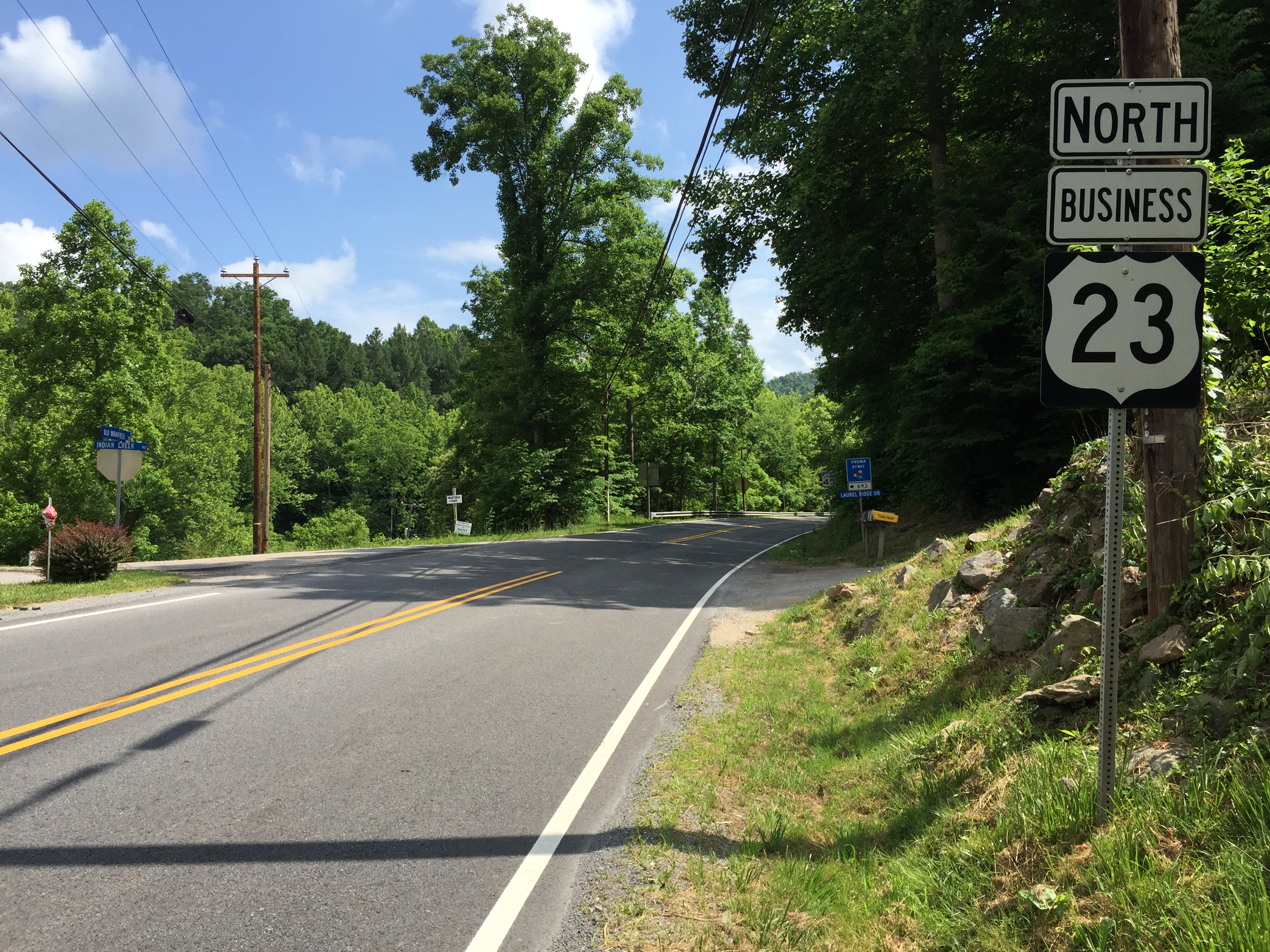
View north along US 23 Bus. just south of Pound

U.S. Route 23 Business (US 23 Bus.) is a business route of US 23 in Pound, Virginia. Most of the business route is coexistent with SR 83, except for a portion that runs along Main Street between SR 83 and US 23.

== Pound bypass route ==
U.S. Route 23 Bypass
- Location: Pound, Virginia

== Pikeville business loop ==
U.S. Route 23 Business
- Location: Pikeville, Kentucky

U.S. Route 23 Business (US 23 Bus.) was a business route of Pikeville, Kentucky. It ran in concurrently with US 460 Bus. The route began at a diamond interchange shared by the eastern terminus of Kentucky Route 1384 (KY 1384) and ran east where it eventually curved south and west around into downtown Pikeville. US 23 Bus./US 460 Bus. ended at an interchange with US 23/US 460.

== Pikeville bypass route ==
U.S. Route 23 Bypass
- Location: Pikeville, Kentucky

== Pikeville spur route ==
U.S. Route 23 Spur
- Location: Pikeville, Kentucky

== Paintsville business loop ==
U.S. Route 23 Business
- Location: Paintsville–Prestonburg, Kentucky

U.S. Route 23 Business (US 23 Bus.) was a business route in Paintsville and Prestonburg, Kentucky. Much of the route ran in a concurrency with US 460 Bus., as well as KY 40, KY 321, and KY 114.

== Ashland business loop ==
U.S. Route 23 Business
- Location: Ashland, Kentucky
- Length: 1.939 mi (3.121 km)

U.S. Route 23 Business (US 23 Bus.) is a business route of US 23 in Ashland, Kentucky. The route runs parallel to the mainline US 23 about a block to the west.

Major intersections
The entire route is in Ashland, Boyd County.

mi	km	Destinations	Notes
0.000	0.000	US 23 south / US 60 east	Continuation beyond southern terminus
1.551	2.496	US 60 (13th Street) / Simeon Willis Memorial Bridge to US 52	Southern end of US 60 overlap; one-way streets, inbound access only from US 60, outbound access only to bridge
1.619	2.606	US 60 west (Martin Luther King Jr. Boulevard) to I-64 west	One-way street, outbound access only
1.619	2.606	US 23 Truck south (Ben Williamson Memorial Bridge)	One-way, inbound access only; southbound truck route begins from bridge
1.694	2.726	US 60 east (11th Street) / US 23 Truck south to I-64 east	One-way street, outbound access only to US 60 east
1.763	2.837	US 60 (10th Street)	Northern end of US 60 overlap; one-way street, inbound access only from US 60
1.939	3.121	Jenny Wiley Trail (US 23 north)	Continuation beyond northern terminus
1.000 mi = 1.609 km; 1.000 km = 0.621 mi: Concurrency terminus

== Ashland spur route ==
U.S. Route 23 Spur
- Location: Ashland, Kentucky
- Length: 0.483 mi (777 m)

U.S. Route 23 Spur (US 23 Spur) is an unsigned spur route of US 23 in Ashland, Kentucky. The route follows the Ben Williamson and Simeon Willis memorial bridges across the Ohio River as a one-way pair. The designation becomes State Route 652 (SR 652) upon entering Ohio and becomes a pair of city streets when the bridges end close to US 23 Bus.

== Ashland truck route ==
U.S. Route 23 Truck
- Location: Ashland, Kentucky
- Length: 0.1 mi (160 m)

U.S. Route 23 Truck (US 23 Truck) is a southbound-only truck route providing access to US 23 from the Ben Williamson Memorial Bridge in Ashland, Kentucky. The route is entirely concurrent with eastbound US 60 from US 23 Bus. at the south end of the Ben Williamson Memorial Bridge to mainline US 23.

== South Portsmouth–Portsmouth truck route ==
U.S. Route 23 Truck
- Location: South Portsmouth, Kentucky–Portsmouth, Ohio
- Length: 3.4 mi (5.5 km)

U.S. Route 23 Truck (US 23 Truck) is a truck route of US 23 between South Portsmouth, Kentucky, and Portsmouth, Ohio. The route overlaps KY 8 and KY 8S to the Carl Perkins Bridge where it then overlaps SR 852 until it turns east along US 52 in Ohio and finally terminates in downtown Portsmouth at US 23 along a one-way pair of southbound Chillicothe Street and northbound Gay Street.

Major intersections

State	County	Location	mi	km	Destinations	Notes
Kentucky	Greenup		0.00	0.00	US 23 (Country Music Highway) / KY 8 north – Greenup, Ashland, Portsmouth	Southern end of KY 8 concurrency; eastern terminus of KY 8; highway continues as US 23 south
Kentucky	Greenup	South Portsmouth	1.0	1.6	KY 8 west / KY 8S north	Southern terminus of KY 8S; north end of KY 8 concurrency; southern end of KY 8S concurrency
Ohio River			1.4 0.0	2.3 0.0	Carl Perkins Bridge; Kentucky–Ohio state line Northern end of KY 8S concurrency; southern end of SR 852 concurrency	
Ohio	Scioto	Washington Township	0.5	0.80	US 52 west (Ohio River Scenic Byway) / SR 852 north to SR 73 west / SR 104 north – Cincinnati, Hillsboro	Northern end of SR 852 concurrency; northbound off-ramp and southbound on-ramp;
Ohio	Scioto	Washington Township	0.5– 0.6	0.80– 0.97	SR 73 west / SR 104 north – Hillsboro	Western end of southbound SR 73/SR 104 concurrency; northbound exit only
Ohio	Scioto	Washington Township	0.6– 0.7	0.97– 1.1	SR 73 east / SR 104 south – Portsmouth	Eastern end of southbound SR 73/SR 104 concurrency; southbound exit and northbound entrance
Ohio	Scioto	Washington Township	0.7	1.1	US 52 west (Ohio River Scenic Byway west)	Southern end of US 52 concurrency; southbound left exit and northbound left entrance
Ohio	Scioto	Portsmouth	1.9	3.1	US 23 south (Chillicothe Street) / US 52 (12th Street)	One-way streets; US 52 (12th Street) feeds into southbound lanes
Ohio	Scioto	Portsmouth	2.0	3.2	US 23 north (Gay Street) / US 52 east (11th Street east)	Northern end of US 52 concurrency; northbound lanes continue east as US 52 (11th Street); one-way streets; northern terminus
1.000 mi = 1.609 km; 1.000 km = 0.621 mi: Concurrency terminus

== Chillicothe business loop ==
U.S. Route 23 Business
- Location: Chillicothe, Ohio

U.S. Route 23 Business (US 23 Bus.) is a business route of US 23 in Chillicothe, Ohio. The route begins at an interchange at mainline US 23 and County Route 205 (Three Locks Road), which is also the northern terminus with the overlap of mainline US 23 and SR 104. Three Locks Road becomes South River Road, taking US 23/SR 104 with it as the route runs parallel to Norfolk Southern Railway's Columbus District until it passes the intersection with Southern Avenue and curves away from the tracks before entering the city limits. At US 50, SR 104 makes a left turn overlapping that route, and US 23 Bus. continues north onto SR 159 (North Bridge Street). US 23 Bus. and SR 159 cross a bridge over the Scioto River then runs under an interchange with US 35. Curving in a northeasterly direction, the route passes under CSX Transportation's Northern Subdivision. US 23 Bus. terminates at another interchange with mainline US 23, while SR 159 continues northward toward the Lancaster area.

== Perrysburg–Toledo business route ==
U.S. Route 23 Business
- Location: Perrysburg–Toledo, Ohio
