= Ela, North Carolina =

- Unincorporated community
- Location within North Carolina Location within the United States
- Coordinates: 35°26′58″N 83°23′27″W
- Country: United States
- State: North Carolina
- County: Swain
- Elevation: 1,795 ft (547 m)
- Time zone: UTC-5 (Eastern (EST))
  - Summer (DST): UTC-4 (EDT)
- ZIP Code(s): 28713, 28719
- Area code: 828
- GNIS feature ID: 1011035

Ela is an unincorporated community in Swain County, North Carolina, United States, located along US 19, northwest of Whittier and east of Bryson City. The name is derived from ᎡᎳᏬᏗ (Elawodi) in the Cherokee language, which translates as "yellow hill."

Ela was once the junction of the Appalachian Railway (1906-1935) and Southern Railway's Murphy Branch.
