= Wolf Laurel, North Carolina =

Unincorporated community in North Carolina, US

Coordinates: 35.9646°N 82.4720°W

Wolf Laurel is a gated community in Madison and Yancey counties in western North Carolina, United States. The unincorporated community is located approximately 30 miles (48 km) north of Asheville and 6 miles (10 km) east of Interstate 26, and borders the Cherokee National Forest, the Tennessee state line and the Appalachian Trail. It is named after Wolf Laurel Branch, which flows into Puncheon Fork after leaving the community upstream.

The community is composed mostly of summer and part-time residences, nestled within the valleys and perched on the slopes of the Walnut Mountains, at elevations ranging from 3,500 feet (1,100 m) to over 5,500 feet (1,700 m) in altitude. Located within the community are tennis courts and recreational center, a golf course and country club center, numerous hiking trails, and road access to the national forest lands and Appalachian Trail.

Skiers from around the Southeast visit Wolf Laurel, primarily for the ski resort contained partly within the community boundary. Hatley Pointe Boutique Ski Resort is one of several ski resorts in western North Carolina, recently undergoing $10 million in renovations in 2023/2024.

Wolf Laurel also boasts the highest elevation bed & breakfast in North Carolina, the Bald Mountain House, at 4,500’ elevation. It is located within the community gates and open year round.

Due to the altitude and because of lying within a region which is subjected to a regular meteorological phenomenon known as Northwest Flow snow events, the average annual snowfall is uncharacteristic of other areas this far south. During the winter months, the community is lightly resided, and mostly attended with visitors to the ski resort.

You can see posts and stuff from Wolf Laurel on instagram: wolflaurel.nc
