= Balfour, North Carolina =

- Census-designated place
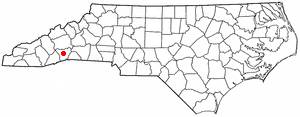
- Location of Balfour, North Carolina
- Coordinates: 35°20′58″N 82°28′57″W
- Country: United States
- State: North Carolina
- County: Henderson
- Named for: William Balfour Troy

Area
  - Total: 1.63 sq mi (4.21 km^{2})
  - Land: 1.62 sq mi (4.20 km^{2})
  - Water: 0 sq mi (0.00 km^{2})
- Elevation: 2,333 ft (711 m)

Population (2020)
  - Total: 1,335
  - Density: 822.3/sq mi (317.49/km^{2})
- Time zone: UTC-5 (Eastern (EST))
  - Summer (DST): UTC-4 (EDT)
- ZIP Code: 28791
- Area code: 828
- FIPS code: 37-03220
- GNIS feature ID: 2402660

Balfour is an unincorporated community and census-designated place (CDP) in Henderson County, North Carolina, United States. As of the 2020 census, Balfour had a population of 1,335. It is part of the Asheville Metropolitan Statistical Area.

== History ==
A post office called Balfour has been in operation since 1893. The community derives its name from Captain William Balfour Troy, the original owner of the town site.

== Geography ==
Balfour is bordered to the south by Hendersonville, the county seat, and to the north by Mountain Home. U.S. Route 25 Business (Asheville Highway) is the main road through the community, leading south into Hendersonville and north 4 miles (6 km) to Interstate 26 and US 25. Downtown Asheville is 21 miles (34 km) north of Balfour.

According to the United States Census Bureau, the CDP has a total area of 1.8 square miles (4.7 km^{2}), of which 0.01 square miles (0.03 km^{2}), or 0.59%, are water. Mud Creek, a north-flowing tributary of the French Broad River, forms the eastern edge of the CDP.

== Demographics ==
Historical population
Census	Pop.	Note	%±
2020	1,335		—
U.S. Decennial Census

As of the census of 2000, there were 1,200 people, 481 households, and 320 families residing in the CDP. The population density was 652.3 inhabitants per square mile (251.9/km^{2}). There were 527 housing units at an average density of 286.5 per square mile (110.6/km^{2}). The racial makeup of the CDP was 90.25% White, 4.75% African American, 0.50% Native American, 1.58% Asian, 2.17% from other races, and 0.75% from two or more races. Hispanic or Latino of any race were 5.92% of the population.

There were 481 households, out of which 22.5% had children under the age of 18 living with them, 50.3% were married couples living together, 12.1% had a female householder with no husband present, and 33.3% were non-families. 28.5% of all households were made up of individuals, and 13.9% had someone living alone who was 65 years of age or older. The average household size was 2.26 and the average family size was 2.75.

In the CDP, the population was spread out, with 17.8% under the age of 18, 8.1% from 18 to 24, 29.3% from 25 to 44, 25.7% from 45 to 64, and 19.3% who were 65 years of age or older. The median age was 42 years. For every 100 females, there were 109.8 males. For every 100 females age 18 and over, there were 111.8 males.

The median income for a household in the CDP was $28,889, and the median income for a family was $40,721. Males had a median income of $28,611 versus $20,139 for females. The per capita income for the CDP was $16,010. About 3.0% of families and 5.1% of the population were below the poverty line, including none of those under age 18 and 2.0% of those age 65 or over.
