= North Carolina Highway 280 =

State highway in North Carolina, US

North Carolina Highway 280

Route information
- Maintained by NCDOT
- Length: 18.1 mi (29.1 km)
- Existed: 1931–present

Major junctions
- West end: US 64 / US 276 in Brevard
- I-26 / US 74 in Fletcher
- East end: US 25 / US 25A in Arden

Location
- Country: United States
- State: North Carolina
- Counties: Transylvania, Henderson, Buncombe

Highway system
- North Carolina Highway System; Interstate; US; State; Scenic
← NC 279	→ NC 281

North Carolina Highway 280 (NC 280) is a primary state highway in the U.S. state of North Carolina that runs from the city of Brevard in Transylvania County to the town of Fletcher in Henderson County. It is 18 miles (29 km) in length, starting at the intersection with US 64 and US 276 north of Brevard to US 25 and US 25A in the Asheville community of Arden.

== Route description ==
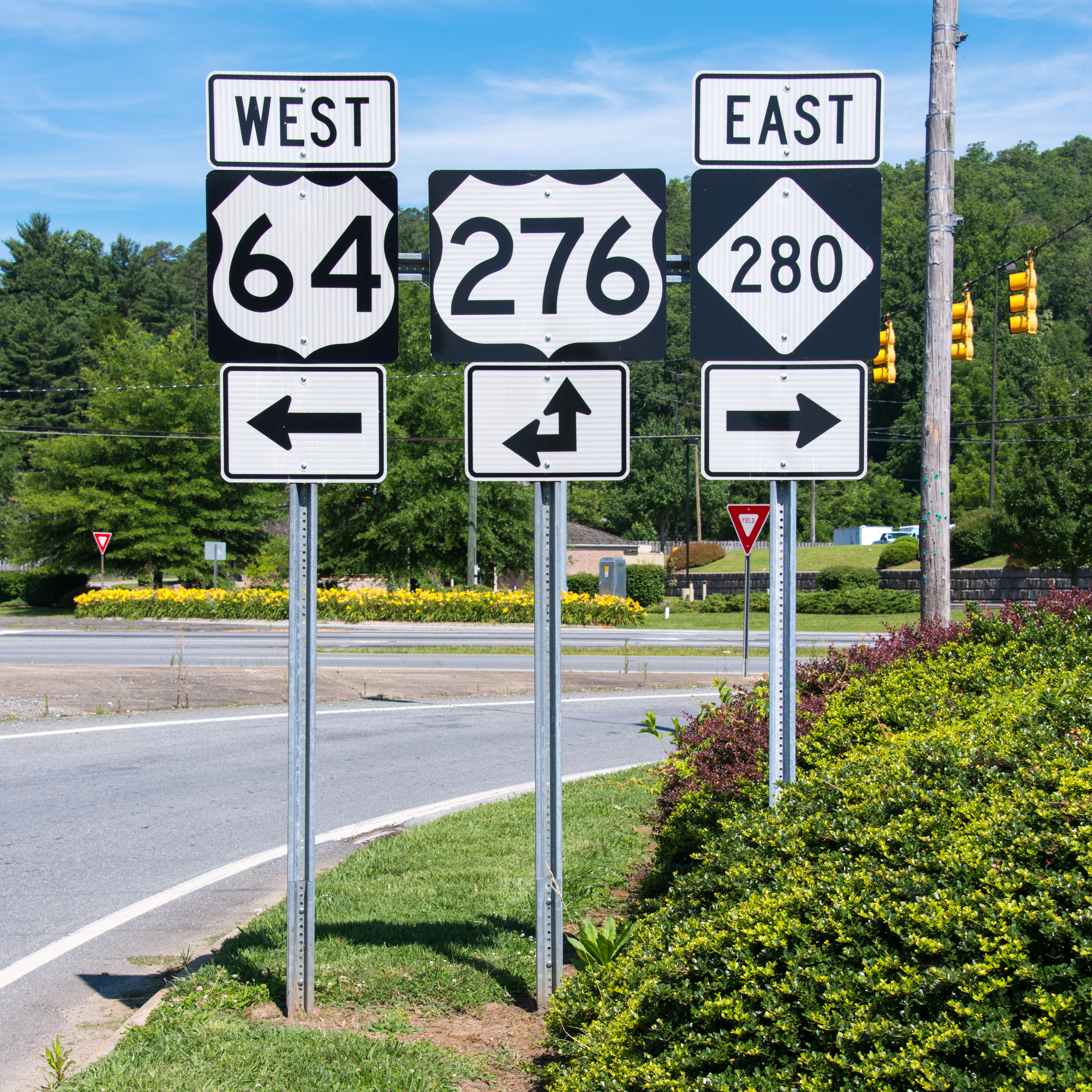
NC 280 starts east from US 64/US 276, in Brevard

NC 280 begins at the junction of US 64 and US 276 near the city of Brevard. It then travels northeasterly through the unincorporated community of Pisgah Forest as a four-lane highway before crossing Little Mountain and entering the Boyd Township community, where it widens to four-lanes with a center turning lane. It runs for a total of 5.2 miles (8.4 km) through Transylvania County as Asheville Highway before entering Henderson County at which point it becomes Boylston Highway. It continues as a four-lane highway with a center turning lane for 6.1 miles (9.8 km) through rural northwestern Henderson County before intersecting NC 191 (Haywood Road) in the town of Mills River. NC 280 and NC 191 run concurrently for 1.1 miles (1.8 km). After crossing the Mills River, a tributary of the French Broad River, NC 191 turns north onto Old Haywood Road, and NC 280 continues as a divided 4-lane, limited-access road for 3 miles (4.8 km).

After crossing the French Broad River, the highway becomes New Airport Road at the intersection of Fanning Bridge Road in Fletcher, where it resumes the configuration of four-lanes with a center turning lane. Between the French Broad River and crossing I-26 and US 74 (exit 40) at a diverging diamond interchange, NC 280 often crosses between Fletcher, Henderson County and the southern reaches of Asheville, Buncombe County. From the I-26 interchange, the road continues for another 1.9 miles (3.1 km), terminating at the intersection of US 25 (Hendersonville Road) and US 25A (Sweeten Creek Road) in Arden.

Although the highway runs primarily through rural farming and residential areas for most of its length, the stretch between Fanning Bridge Road and US 25 currently represents the most developed section of the highway. A growing number of national retailers, restaurants, and hotels can be found within a half-mile of the I-26/US 74 interchange. Landmarks along this section of highway include Asheville Regional Airport and the WNC Agricultural Center, site of the annual North Carolina Mountain State Fair. For 10.1 miles (16.3 km) of its path through Transylvania and Henderson counties, the highway runs adjacent to the eastern boundary of Pisgah National Forest.

== History ==
Rerouted from its original path to become a connecting route from I-26 at the Asheville Regional Airport to the city of Brevard, its expanded and current form was originally known as the Brevard/I-26 Connector. Until 1991, NC 280 ran concurrent with NC 191 from Mills River in Henderson County to the community of Avery Creek in Buncombe County, at which point NC 280 turned onto Long Shoals Road (currently signed NC 146). The former eastern terminus of NC 280 was at US 25 (Hendersonville Road) in the community of Skyland, 1.9 miles (3.1 km) north of the highway's current terminus at US 25 and US 25A in Arden.

== Major intersections ==
County	Location	mi	km	Destinations	Notes
Transylvania	Brevard	0.00	0.00	US 64 / US 276 – Brevard, Hendersonville, Waynesville	To Brevard College and Cradle of Forestry
Henderson	Mills River	11.3	18.2	NC 191 (Haywood Road) – Hendersonville	South end of NC 191 overlap
Henderson	Mills River	12.4	20.0	NC 191 (Old Haywood Road)	North end of NC 191 overlap
Buncombe	Fletcher	16.0– 16.1	25.7– 25.9	I-26 / US 74 – Hendersonville, Asheville	Exit 40 (I-26)
Buncombe	Arden	18.1	29.1	US 25 (Hendersonville Road) / US 25A north (Sweeten Creek Road) – Asheville	Southern terminus of US 25A
1.000 mi = 1.609 km; 1.000 km = 0.621 mi
