= Mountain Home, North Carolina =

- Census-designated place
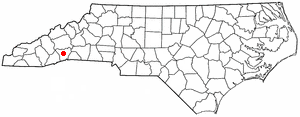
- Location of Mountain Home, North Carolina
- Coordinates: 35°22′15″N 82°30′08″W
- Country: United States
- State: North Carolina
- County: Henderson

Area
  - Total: 3.79 sq mi (9.82 km^{2})
  - Land: 3.77 sq mi (9.77 km^{2})
  - Water: 0.023 sq mi (0.06 km^{2})
- Elevation: 2,120 ft (650 m)

Population (2020)
  - Total: 3,490
  - Density: 925.5/sq mi (357.35/km^{2})
- Time zone: UTC-5 (Eastern (EST))
  - Summer (DST): UTC-4 (EDT)
- ZIP code: 28758
- Area code: 828
- FIPS code: 37-44700
- GNIS feature ID: 2403312

Mountain Home is an unincorporated community and census-designated place (CDP) in Henderson County, North Carolina, United States. As of the 2020 census, Mountain Home had a population of 3,490. It is part of the Asheville Metropolitan Statistical Area.

== Geography ==
Mountain Home is located in north-central Henderson County. It is bordered to the south by Balfour and to the northeast by Mud Creek, a tributary of the French Broad River. North Carolina Highway 191 forms the southwestern edge of the CDP. U.S. Route 25 Business (Asheville Highway) is the main road through Mountain Home, leading north 2 miles (3 km) to Interstate 26 and 17 miles (27 km) to Asheville. US 25 Business leads south 4 miles (6 km) to Hendersonville.

According to the United States Census Bureau, the CDP has a total area of 3.8 square miles (9.8 km^{2}), of which 0.02 square miles (0.06 km^{2}), or 0.58%, are water.

== Demographics ==
Historical population
Census	Pop.	Note	%±
2020	3,490		—
U.S. Decennial Census

=== 2020 census ===
As of the 2020 census, Mountain Home had a population of 3,490. There were 1,389 households, including 1,051 families, in the CDP. The median age was 48.2 years. 18.7% of residents were under the age of 18 and 25.9% were 65 years of age or older. For every 100 females, there were 97.0 males, and for every 100 females age 18 and over, there were 97.2 males age 18 and over.

99.3% of residents lived in urban areas, while 0.7% lived in rural areas.

Mountain Home racial composition
Race	Number	Percentage
White (non-Hispanic)	2,798	80.17%
Black or African American (non-Hispanic)	65	1.86%
Native American	9	0.26%
Asian	37	1.06%
Pacific Islander	17	0.49%
Other/Mixed	116	3.32%
Hispanic or Latino	448	12.84%

Of the 1,389 households, 24.3% had children under the age of 18 living in them. Of all households, 53.9% were married-couple households, 17.1% were households with a male householder and no spouse or partner present, and 22.4% were households with a female householder and no spouse or partner present. About 26.1% of all households were made up of individuals, and 12.4% had someone living alone who was 65 years of age or older.

There were 1,538 housing units, of which 9.7% were vacant. The homeowner vacancy rate was 1.3% and the rental vacancy rate was 6.4%.

=== 2000 census ===
As of the census of 2000, there were 2,169 people, 906 households, and 656 families residing in the CDP. The population density was 816.9 inhabitants per square mile (315.4/km^{2}). There were 993 housing units at an average density of 374.0 per square mile (144.4/km^{2}). The racial makeup of the CDP was 95.71% White, 1.15% African American, 0.55% Native American, 0.83% Asian, 0.14% Pacific Islander, 0.14% from other races, and 1.48% from two or more races. Hispanic or Latino of any race were 3.18% of the population.

There were 906 households, out of which 25.7% had children under the age of 18 living with them, 59.7% were married couples living together, 9.2% had a female householder with no husband present, and 27.5% were non-families. 23.1% of all households were made up of individuals, and 8.8% had someone living alone who was 65 years of age or older. The average household size was 2.38 and the average family size was 2.75.

In the CDP, the population was spread out, with 20.4% under the age of 18, 6.0% from 18 to 24, 26.2% from 25 to 44, 26.2% from 45 to 64, and 21.1% who were 65 years of age or older. The median age was 43 years. For every 100 females, there were 100.1 males. For every 100 females age 18 and over, there were 96.1 males.

The median income for a household in the CDP was $41,042, and the median income for a family was $50,648. Males had a median income of $30,662 versus $22,011 for females. The per capita income for the CDP was $22,829. About 4.7% of families and 9.2% of the population were below the poverty line, including 7.9% of those under age 18 and 12.9% of those age 65 or over.
