= Tanger Outlets Asheville =

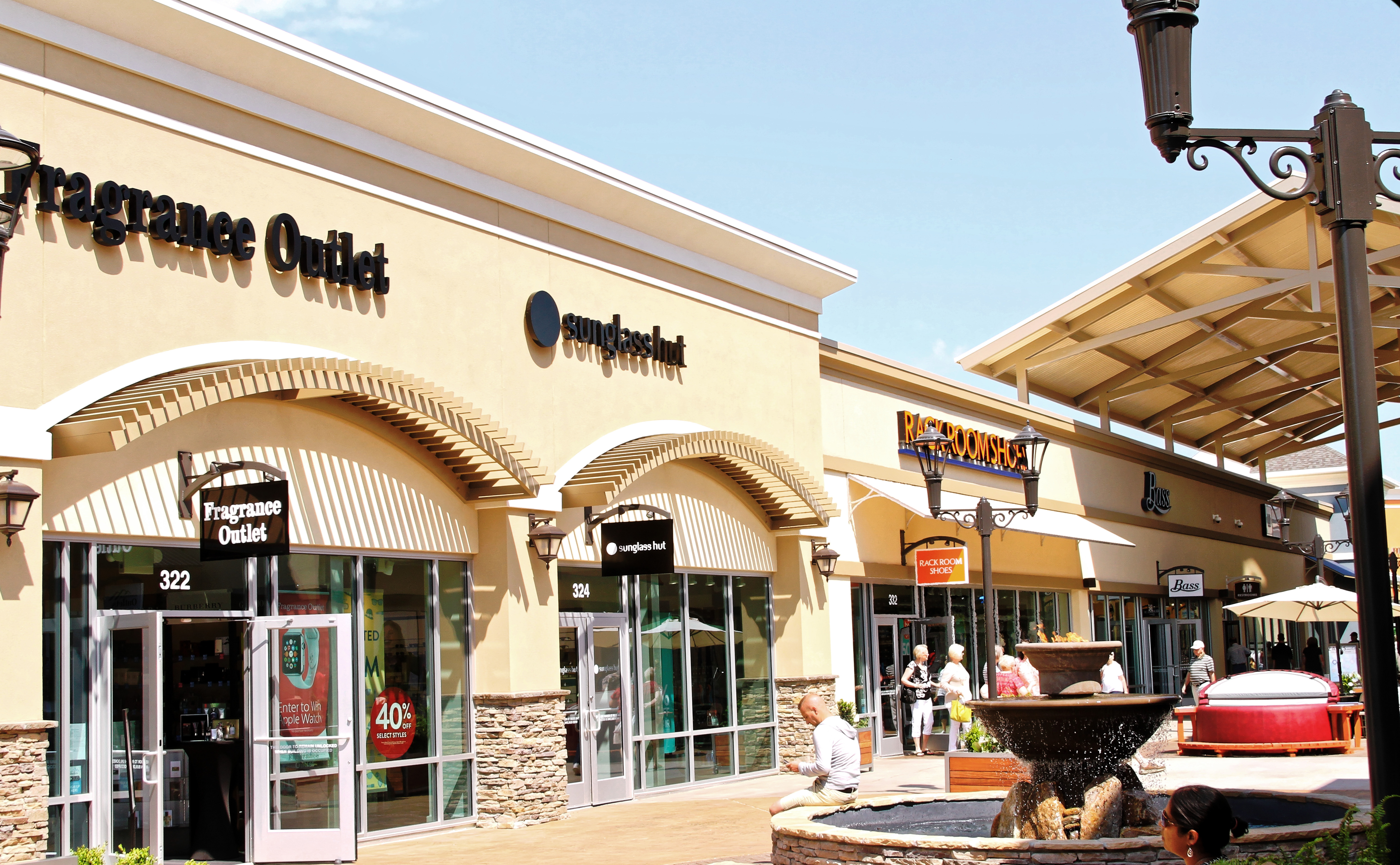
- Asheville Outlets, May 2015
- Location: Asheville, North Carolina, United States
- Coordinates: 35.5303°N 82.6049°W
- Address: 800 Brevard Road, Asheville, NC 28806
- Opened: October 25, 1989 (as Biltmore Square Mall); May 1, 2015 (as Asheville Outlets)
- Closed: January 31, 2014 (as Biltmore Square)
- Developer: Crown American; Edward J. DeBartolo; George H.V. Cecil
- Manager: Destiny Gosnell
- Owner: Tanger (2023–present)
- Num. of stores: 70
- Num. of anchor tenants: 2
- Floor area: 325,000 sq ft (30,200 m^{2})
- Floors: 1
- Parking: 3,127 spaces
- Website: tanger.com/asheville

Tanger Outlets Asheville is a shopping mall located just off Andrew Jackson Highway (I-26/US 74) on Brevard Road (NC 191) in Asheville, North Carolina, United States.

Outlet stores include Ann Taylor Factory Store, Banana Republic Factory Store, Brooks Brothers Factory Store, Coach, Cole Haan, GAP Factory Store, J. Crew Factory, Nike Factory Store, RH Outlet, Tommy Hilfiger, Under Armour, and Vera Bradley. Field & Stream did have a store but has since closed when it was Asheville Outlets and is now a Sportsman's Warehouse.

The mall opened in 1989 as Biltmore Square Mall, featuring Hess's, Proffitt's, and Belk; when the original concept of the mall failed, it was demolished throughout 2014 and reconstructed in 2015 as an outlet mall. On November 13, 2023, it was acquired by Tanger, an open-air shopping mall administrator, for 70 million dollars.

== History ==
Biltmore Square Mall, the original shopping center on the site, was built in 1989 with Hess's, Proffitt's, and Belk as its anchor stores. The mall was developed by a joint venture of Crown American, Edward J. DeBartolo Corporation, and George H. V. Cecil.

In March 1998, the mall management (along with other plaintiffs) attempted to resist annexation into the city of Asheville. The attempt was unsuccessful.

In November 2006, Symphony Property Group and two local investment groups (collectively calling themselves Biltmore Eight, LLC) purchased the shopping center with the assistance of a third-party loan.

Cinebarre, a new concept in movie theaters and restaurants, was unveiled in the Biltmore Square Mall in 2007. Food, beer, and wine are served before and during the screening of films in the theater.

The mall closed on January 31, 2014, except for the anchors and Dollar Tree. Belk closed at the end of 2014.

The redeveloped shopping center opened on May 1, 2015 as an outlet mall called Asheville Outlets. Developed by New England Development, its new anchor stores are Dillard's Clearance Center & Field & Stream with other stores including Nike Factory Store, Under Armour, Coach, Abercrombie & Fitch Outlet, Cole Haan, Tommy Hilfiger, Bath & Body Works and close to 65 other stores. It is an open-air mall that features covered breezeways and a fire and water fountain.

In November 2023 Tanger Inc. announced its purchase of Asheville Outlets with plans to improve food and beverage and add retailers. In January 2024, to reflect the ownership change, the shopping center was rebranded as Tanger Outlets Asheville.
