= Alexander, North Carolina =

- Unincorporated community
- Location within North Carolina Location within the United States
- Coordinates: 35°42′09″N 82°37′08″W
- Country: United States
- State: North Carolina
- County: Buncombe
- Elevation: 1,913 ft (583 m)
- Time zone: UTC-5 (Eastern (EST))
  - Summer (DST): UTC-4 (EDT)
- ZIP code: 28701
- Area code: 828
- GNIS feature ID: 2745928

Alexander is an unincorporated community in Buncombe County, North Carolina, United States. Alexander is located on the French Broad River and North Carolina Highway 251, 3.3 miles (5.3 km) west of Weaverville. Alexander has a post office with ZIP code 28701, which opened on September 13, 1881.
