= Interstate 26 =

Interstate Highway mostly in the Carolinas

Interstate 26
- I-26 highlighted in red

Route information
- Length: 328.09 mi (528.01 km)
- Existed: August 14, 1957–present
- NHS: Entire route

Major junctions
- West end: US 11W / US 23 in Kingsport, TN
- I-81 in Kingsport, TN; I-40 / I-240 in Asheville, NC; I-85 in Southern Shops, SC; I-385 near Laurens, SC; I-20 in St. Andrews, SC; I-77 near Columbia, SC; I-95 near Bowman, SC
- East end: US 17 in Charleston, SC

Location
- Country: United States
- States: Tennessee, North Carolina, South Carolina

Highway system
- Interstate Highway System; Main; Auxiliary; Suffixed; Business; Future

Interstate 26 (I-26) is a main route of the Interstate Highway System in the Southeastern United States. Nominally east–west, as indicated by its even number, I-26 runs from the junction of US Route 11W (US 11W) and US 23 in Kingsport, Tennessee, generally southeastward to US 17 in Charleston, South Carolina. The portion from Mars Hill, North Carolina, east (compass south) to I-240 in Asheville, North Carolina, has signs indicating FUTURE I-26, because the highway does not yet meet all of the Interstate Highway standards.

Northward from Kingsport, US 23 continues to Portsmouth, Ohio, as Corridor B of the Appalachian Development Highway System, and beyond to Columbus, Ohio, as Corridor C. In conjunction with the Columbus–Toledo corridor in Ohio formed by I-75, US 23, and State Route 15 (SR 15), I-26 forms part of a mostly high-speed four-or-more-lane highway from the Great Lakes to the Atlantic Coast at Charleston, South Carolina.

== Route description ==
Lengths
	mi	km
TN	54.45	87.63
NC	52.69	84.80
SC	220.95	355.58
Total	328.09	528.01

I-26 is a diagonal Interstate Highway, which runs northwest–southeast. The extension north of Asheville is mostly north–south. Where I-26 crosses the French Broad River in Asheville at the Jeffrey Bowen Bridge (previously known as the Smoky Park Bridge), the highway runs in opposite directions from its designations. (I-26 westbound actually goes east. I-26 runs concurrently with I-240, so that I-240 eastbound and I-26 westbound are the same route.) When the extension was made in 2003, the exit numbers in North Carolina were increased by 31 to reflect the new mileage. The part that it shares with I-240 is signed as both I-240 and I-26 but follows the I-240 exit numbering pattern.

I-26 has signs with an extra FUTURE sign above (and in the same style as) the EAST and WEST signs from Asheville north to Mars Hill, North Carolina, because the older US 23 freeway does not yet meet all of the Interstate Highway standards. The road shoulders remain substandard or nonexistent along short sections of the route. A rebuild and relocation is also planned in Asheville to avoid some tight interchanges.

=== Tennessee ===
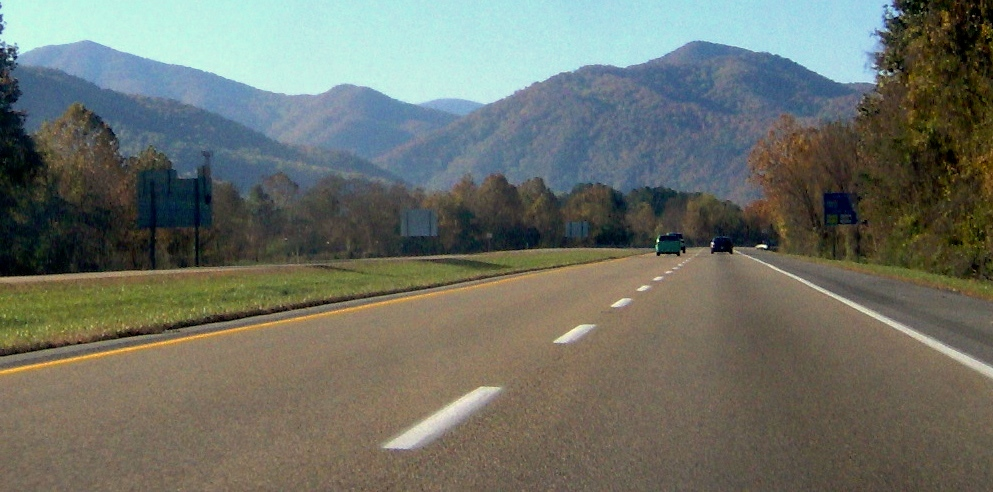
I-26 approaching the Bald Mountains near Erwin, Tennessee

The exit numbers in Tennessee were formerly numbered backward—increasing from east (physically south) to west (physically north)—because this highway was formerly signed north–south as US 23 (and I-181). Although this is consistent with the south-to-north numbering conventions, this exit numbering was changed on all 284 signs along I-26 to be consistent with the rest of the east-to-west-numbered highway in March 2007. The remaining I-181 signs north of I-81 were also replaced with I-26 signs at that time.

For its entire length in Tennessee, I-26 shares a concurrency with US 23. The route is named the James H. Quillen Parkway, after Jimmy Quillen, a past member of the US House of Representatives for Tennessee.

In Tennessee, US 23 runs south from the Virginia state line for one mile (1.6 km) to Kingsport. I-26 begins at the junction of US 23 with US 11W (which is locally named Stone Drive) northwest of the city. After about 1,000 yards (910 m), I-26 crosses the South Fork Holston River before swinging around to a generally southeast path through Sullivan County. It reaches its major interchange with I-81 at exit 8A, southwest of Colonial Heights.

Shortly after entering Washington County, it reaches the northwest part of Johnson City and also serves as a local transit route as it makes its way around the north and eastern parts of the city. It begins to travel through more obviously mountainous terrain before turning to travel in a south direction. Entering Carter County briefly, it passes exit 27 before entering the Cherokee National Forest and Unicoi County. From this point, it passes through part of the Blue Ridge Mountains, first the Unaka Range and, later, as it passes Erwin, between exits 34 and 40, the Bald Mountains. It meets the Nolichucky River just after milemarker 38 and travels along its southeast bank before crossing it immediately before exit 40.

The remainder of I-26 in Tennessee passes through a sparsely populated area, at elevations of above 1,800 feet (550 m), before reaching the North Carolina state line.

=== North Carolina ===
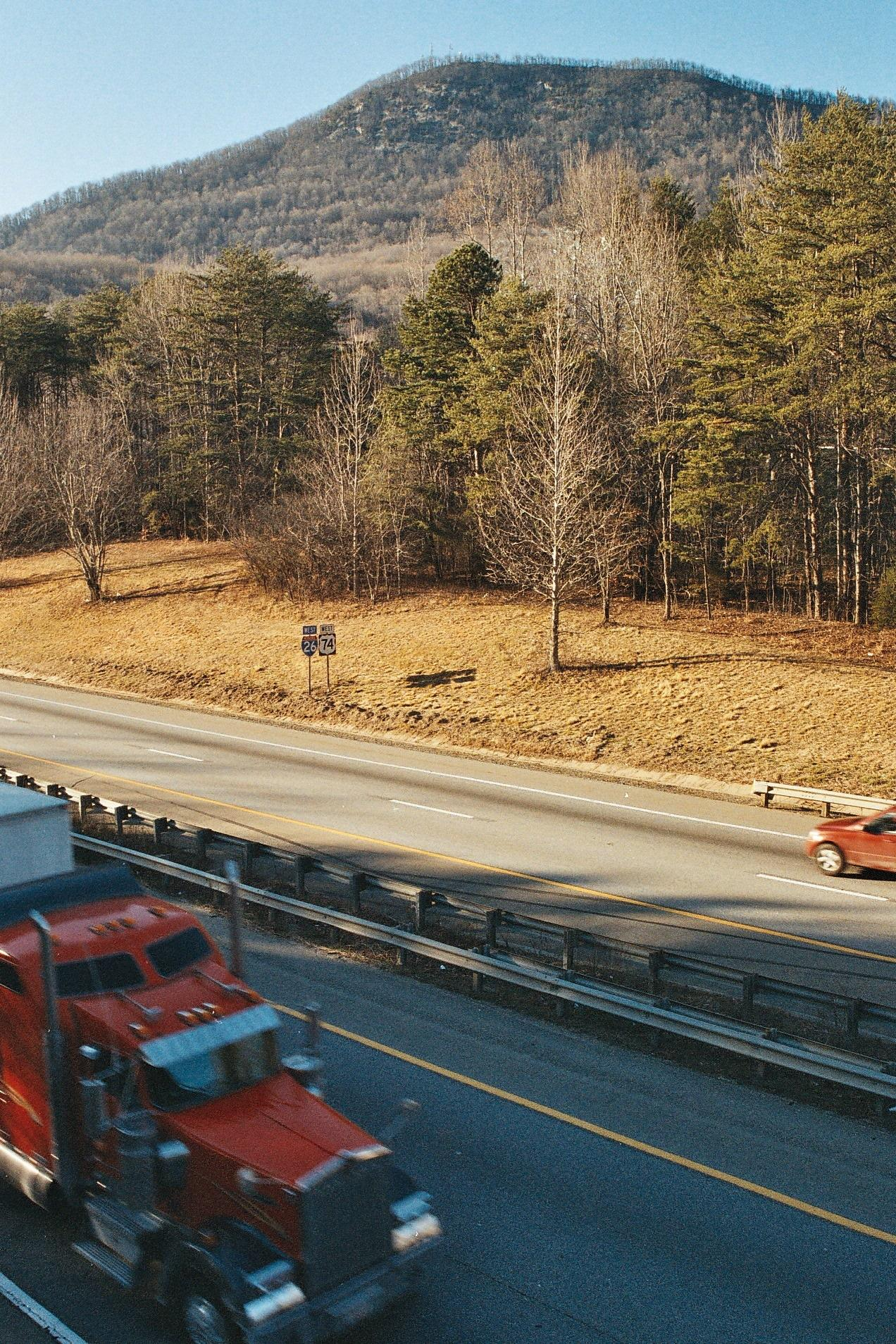
I-26 and US 74 in Polk County, North Carolina

As I-26 crosses the Bald Mountains after crossing the North Carolina–Tennessee state line, it travels through a relatively high-elevation rural area. At Sam's Gap, its reaches its highest elevation of 3,760 feet (1,150 m). At Buckner Gap, I-26 reaches 3,370 feet (1,030 m) in elevation. For two miles (3.2 km) on each side of the state line, its elevation is at least 3,000 feet (910 m).

It enters first the Walnut and Bald mountains of the Appalachian Mountains, passing through the Pisgah and Cherokee national forests as it does so, and then the Blue Ridge Mountains. Future I-26, which is not signed I-26 because it does not yet meet all interstate standards, then passes through Mars Hill and Weaverville. After coming into Asheville from the north, I-26 merges with I-240 and the two share the highway for 4.5 miles (7.2 km), crossing French Broad River in the process. The two highways then have a major interchange with I-40, where I-240 ends and US 23 splits off to the east. I-26 leaves Asheville toward the south.

The land flattens substantially after entering the French Broad River drainage basin from Arden, Fletcher, and Hendersonville to Flat Rock in Henderson County. Then it crosses the Eastern Continental Divide at an elevation of 2,130 feet (650 m), and it passes over the highest bridge in North Carolina, the Peter Guice Memorial Bridge, 225 feet (69 m) above the Green River between Flat Rock and Saluda. I-26 heads down a six-percent grade for the next three miles (4.8 km) through Howard Gap, into Polk County, and intersects with US 74, a limited-access freeway near Columbus, at an elevation of around 1,100 feet (340 m). Afterward, I-26 exits the state and heads about 20 miles (32 km) to Spartanburg, South Carolina, exiting the foothills of the Blue Ridge Mountains.

I-26 has been deemed a scenic highway in North Carolina between its interchange with US 19/US 23 N (exit 9) and the North Carolina–Tennessee border. At Sam's Gap, the Appalachian Trail crosses under I-26. In addition, northbound travelers are able to see the Blue Ridge Parkway.

=== South Carolina ===
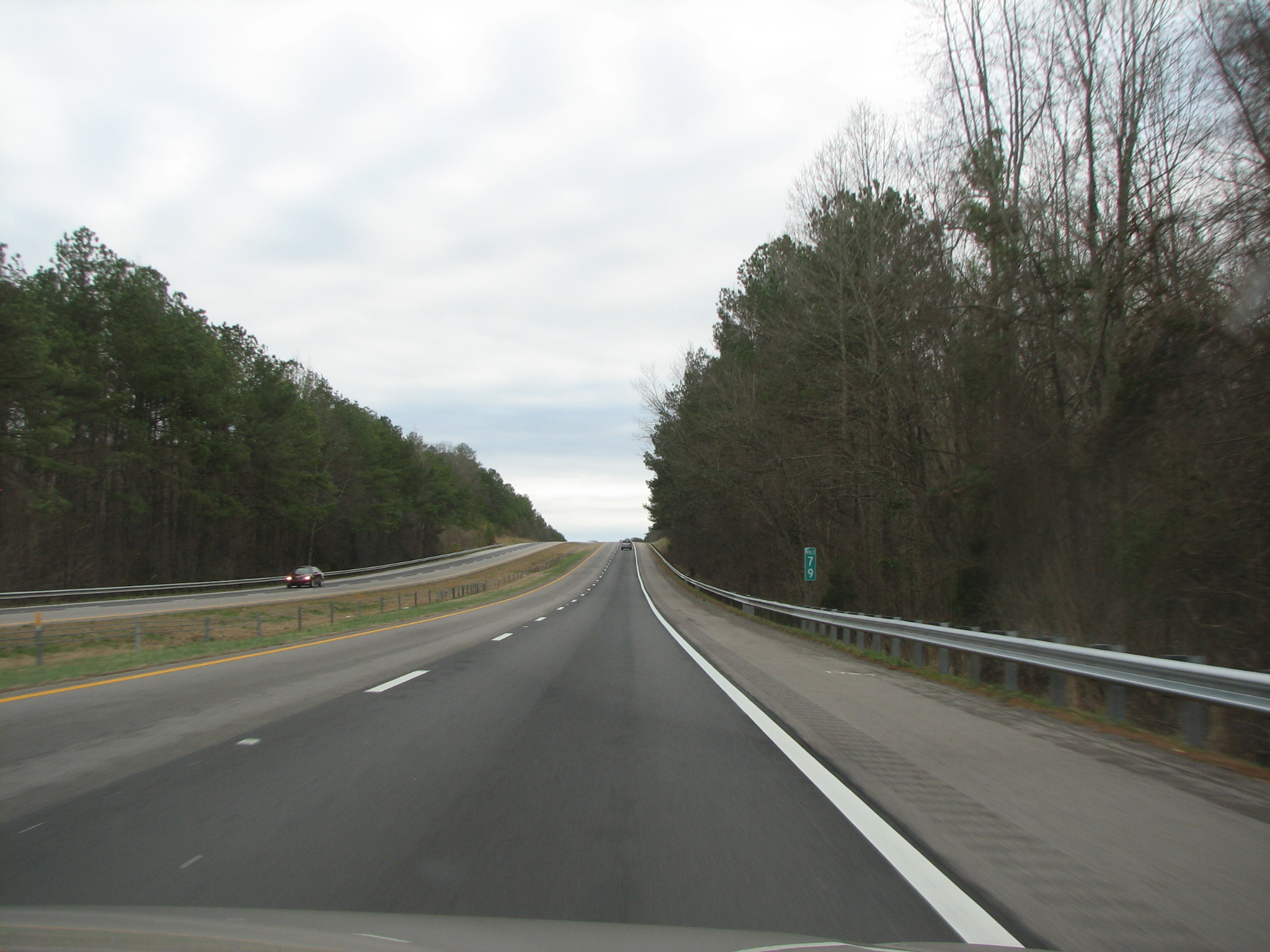
Eastbound along I-26 in South Carolina near Prosperity

I-26 enters South Carolina just northeast of Landrum, traveling southeast. The first major city along its route is Spartanburg, where it intersects I-85. Traveling through the Sumter National Forest, it connects with Newberry before entering the Columbia metropolitan area, where it connects to the southern terminus of I-77 in Cayce.

I-26 continues southeast to Orangeburg County where it intersects with I-95. Between Cayce and Orangeburg, the highway goes up and down a few very long hills averaging about 100 feet (30 m). After I-95, the highway travels southeast over flat plains with little urbanization past Summerville until it reaches its eastern terminus in Charleston.

I-26 is deemed a hurricane evacuation route in South Carolina. During hurricane evacuation, lane reversal on I-26 will occur between its junctions with I-526 in Charleston and I-77 in Columbia. This is to aid travelers leaving the Charleston area. Lane reversal on I-26 has been used, such as during evacuations for Hurricane Florence in September 2018.

== History ==
Funding for I-26 in South Carolina was provided by the Federal-Aid Highway Act of 1956. The first section of I-26 was built in South Carolina between Columbia and Charleston. Construction started in 1957 and ended in 1969 with an 11-mile (18 km) portion opening on September 7, 1960. By late 1960, I-26 was complete from Spartanburg to Columbia, and, in February 1969, I-26's construction from the South Carolina–North Carolina border to Columbia was completed at a cost of $118 million (equivalent to $772 million in 2024).

The first section of I-26 in North Carolina consisted of 14 miles (23 km) of the Interstate near Hendersonville, which opened in January 1967. I-26 between the South Carolina–North Carolina border and Asheville was completed in 1976 at a cost of $54.1 million (equivalent to $231 million in 2024).

The planning for an extension of I-26 from Asheville to I-81 near Kingsport started in 1987 to accommodate truckers traveling toward I-81 that were banned on US 19 and US 23. I-26 from Mars Hill, North Carolina, to the North Carolina–Tennessee border opened in August 2003 at a cost of $230 million (equivalent to $375 million in 2024). At this time, the full extension of I-26 from the North Carolina–Tennessee border to I-81 was signed.

=== Interstate 181 ===
Interstate 181
- Location: Johnson City–Kingsport, Tennessee
- Length: 23.85 mi (38.38 km)
- Existed: 1985–2007

Interstate 181 (I-181) was established in December 1985 as an Interstate designation of US 23, which was already built to Interstate standards in the 1970s. In Tennessee, I-181 traversed from US 321/State Route 67 (SR 67), in Johnson City, to US 11W/SR 1, in Kingsport, totaling 23.85 miles (38.38 km). US 23 continued on both directions as Interstate grade to the Virginia line to the north and 15 miles (24 km) south to Erwin; by 1992, US 23 was upgraded to Interstate grade south to Sam's Gap at the North Carolina line. All exit numbers were based on US 23 mileage. On August 5, 2003, after completion of a nine-mile (14 km) section in North Carolina, I-26 was extended west into Tennessee, replacing I-181 from Johnson City to I-81; north of I-81, I-181 continued into Kingsport.

The American Association of State Highway and Transportation Officials (AASHTO) initially ruled against an extension of I-26 (as the number) along the remainder of I-181 to Kingsport since that would give a main route Interstate Highway (I-26) a so-called "stub end", not connecting to any other Interstate Highway, an international border, or a seacoast. In 2005, the numerical extension was enacted by the effect of the Safe, Accountable, Flexible, Efficient Transportation Equity Act: A Legacy for Users (SAFETEA-LU), being signed into law on August 10. In March 2007, I-181 was officially decommissioned, as all signs and exit numbers were changed over to I-26's designation.

== Future ==
The I-26 Connector in Asheville will relocate Interstate 26 across the French Broad River, convert Patton Avenue along Bowen Bridges to local traffic and reroute I-240 along I-26 further north. The final contract for the main section, awarded to Archer–Wright Joint Venture, totalled $1.15 billion, the largest contract in the state's history. The design was selected May 15, 2024.

== Major junctions ==
Tennessee
US 11W / US 23 in Kingsport. Begin US 23 concurrency.
I-81 in Kingsport
US 11E / US 19W in Johnson City. I-26/US 11W/US 23 travels concurrently to Temple Hill.
US 321 in Johnson City
North Carolina
US 19 / US 23A northeast of Mars Hill. Begin US 19 concurrency.
US 19 / US 23 south of Forks of Ivy. End US 19 and US 23 concurrencies.
Gap in route
I-40 / I-240 / US 74 in Asheville. I-26/US 74 travels concurrently to Columbus.
US 25 in Fletcher. The highways travel concurrently to east of East Flat Rock
South Carolina
US 176 east-southeast of Inman
I-85 in Southern Shops
US 29 in Spartanburg
US 221 in Moore
I-385 in Clinton
US 176 northwest of Irmo
US 76 / US 176 in Irmo. I-26/US 76 travels concurrently to Columbia
I-20 in St. Andrews
I-126 in Columbia
US 378 in West Columbia
US 1 in West Columbia
US 21 / US 176 / US 321 in Cayce
I-77 in Cayce
US 21 / US 176 southeast of Pine Ridge
US 21 south of Sandy Run
US 601 north-northeast of Orangeburg
I-95 east of Bowman
US 15 north of Rosinville
US 17 Alt. in Summerville
US 78 in North Charleston
I-526 in North Charleston
US 52 in Charleston
US 17 in Charleston. Begin US 17 concurrency.
US 78 in Charleston
US 17 in Charleston. End US 17 concurrency.

== Auxiliary routes ==
- I-126 is a spur into Columbia from the northwest; established in 1961, it shares complete concurrency with US 76.
- I-326 was an unsigned designated spur to South Carolina Highway 48 (SC 48) in Columbia; approved in 1976, it was decommissioned in 1995 in favor of I-77.
- I-526 is a partial beltway of Charleston, running from US 17 west of the city north to I-26 and back east and south to US 17 in Mount Pleasant; it was established in 1989 and features a business spur on its eastern terminus.
