= Avery Creek, North Carolina =

- Census-designated place
- Location in Buncombe County and the state of North Carolina
- Coordinates: 35°27′54″N 82°34′19″W
- Country: United States
- State: North Carolina
- County: Buncombe

Area
  - Total: 1.73 sq mi (4.49 km^{2})
  - Land: 1.73 sq mi (4.49 km^{2})
  - Water: 0 sq mi (0.00 km^{2})
- Elevation: 2,231 ft (680 m)

Population (2020)
  - Total: 2,241
  - Density: 1,294.1/sq mi (499.66/km^{2})
- Time zone: UTC-5 (Eastern (EST))
  - Summer (DST): UTC-4 (EDT)
- ZIP code: 28704
- Area code: 828
- FIPS code: 37-02760
- GNIS feature ID: 2402655

Avery Creek is a census-designated place (CDP) in Buncombe County, North Carolina, United States. As of the 2020 census, Avery Creek had a population of 2,241. It is part of the Asheville Metropolitan Statistical Area.

== Geography ==
Avery Creek is located in southern Buncombe County. The main road through the community is North Carolina Highway 191 (Brevard Road), leading north 11 miles (18 km) to downtown Asheville and south 13 miles (21 km) to Hendersonville. North Carolina Highway 146 (Long Shoals Road) heads east from Avery Creek, leading 1.6 miles (2.6 km) to Interstate 26 and 3.5 miles (5.6 km) to the Skyland neighborhood of Asheville.

According to the United States Census Bureau, the Avery Creek CDP has a total area of 1.7 square miles (4.5 km^{2}), all land.

== Demographics ==
Historical population
Census	Pop.	Note	%±
2020	2,241		—
U.S. Decennial Census

=== 2020 census ===
As of the 2020 census, Avery Creek had a population of 2,241. The median age was 42.9 years. 23.0% of residents were under the age of 18 and 16.6% of residents were 65 years of age or older. For every 100 females there were 91.7 males, and for every 100 females age 18 and over there were 87.9 males age 18 and over.

98.8% of residents lived in urban areas, while 1.2% lived in rural areas.

There were 858 households in Avery Creek, of which 35.8% had children under the age of 18 living in them. Of all households, 58.3% were married-couple households, 11.4% were households with a male householder and no spouse or partner present, and 24.5% were households with a female householder and no spouse or partner present. About 20.4% of all households were made up of individuals and 10.0% had someone living alone who was 65 years of age or older.

There were 917 housing units, of which 6.4% were vacant. The homeowner vacancy rate was 0.9% and the rental vacancy rate was 1.6%.

Racial composition as of the 2020 census
Race	Number	Percent
White	1,816	81.0%
Black or African American	98	4.4%
American Indian and Alaska Native	1	0.0%
Asian	141	6.3%
Native Hawaiian and Other Pacific Islander	0	0.0%
Some other race	41	1.8%
Two or more races	144	6.4%
Hispanic or Latino (of any race)	113	5.0%

=== 2000 census ===
As of the census of 2000, there were 1,405 people, 561 households, and 414 families residing in the CDP. The population density was 818.8 inhabitants per square mile (316.1/km^{2}). There were 584 housing units at an average density of 340.3 per square mile (131.4/km^{2}). The racial makeup of the CDP was 95.02% White, 2.92% African American, 0.28% Native American, 0.50% Asian, 0.28% from other races, and 1.00% from two or more races. Hispanic or Latino of any race were 1.35% of the population.

There were 561 households, out of which 30.5% had children under the age of 18 living with them, 64.0% were married couples living together, 7.0% had a female householder with no husband present, and 26.2% were non-families. 21.4% of all households were made up of individuals, and 4.6% had someone living alone who was 65 years of age or older. The average household size was 2.50 and the average family size was 2.92.

In the CDP, the population was spread out, with 22.5% under the age of 18, 7.2% from 18 to 24, 32.0% from 25 to 44, 26.4% from 45 to 64, and 12.0% who were 65 years of age or older. The median age was 39 years. For every 100 females, there were 93.3 males. For every 100 females age 18 and over, there were 90.7 males.

The median income for a household in the CDP was $47,619, and the median income for a family was $51,042. Males had a median income of $41,123 versus $28,281 for females. The per capita income for the CDP was $22,386. About 4.9% of families and 4.9% of the population were below the poverty line, including 11.7% of those under age 18 and none of those age 65 or over.
