= Jupiter, North Carolina =

Unincorporated community in North Carolina, US

Coordinates: 35°45′39″N 82°35′36″W

Jupiter is an unincorporated community in northwestern Buncombe County, North Carolina, United States, located off U.S. Highway 25/70, and Interstate 26. It was disincorporated in 1970. It lies at an elevation of 2,175 feet (663 m).
