= William Clyde Baker Jr. =

United States Army officer (1904–1966)

William C. Baker Jr.
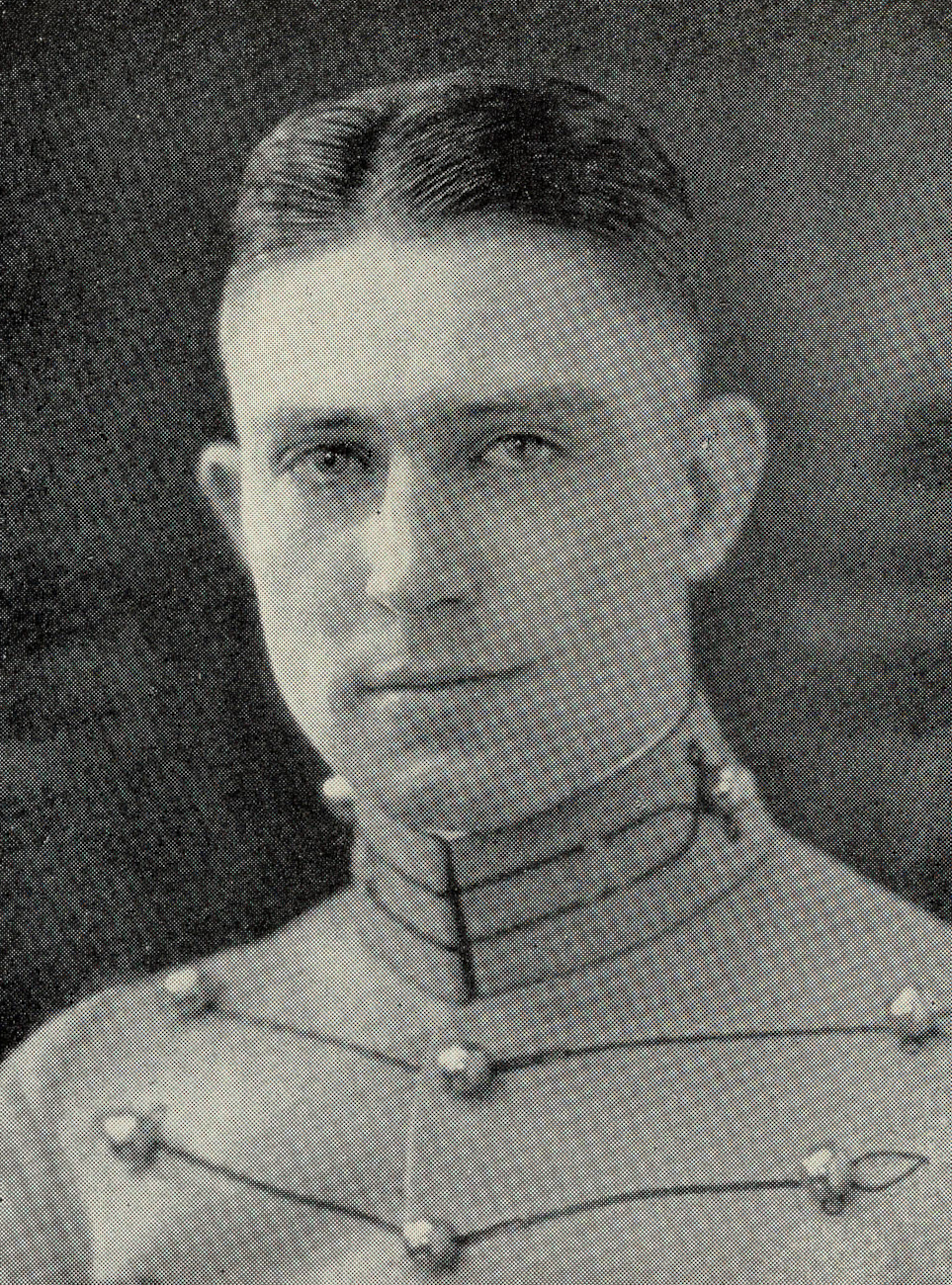
- Baker Jr. as a West Point cadet c. 1926
- Born: May 9, 1904; Alexander, North Carolina, United States
- Died: October 5, 1966; Washington, D.C., United States
- Burial place: Arlington National Cemetery, Virginia, United States
- Alma mater: West Point (1926); Cornell University (1928); USACGSC (1938)
- Military career
- Allegiance: United States
- Branch: United States Army
- Service years: 1926–1966
- Rank: Major General
- Unit: Corps of Engineers
- Conflicts: World War II; Battle of the Bulge; Korean War
- Awards: Army Distinguished Service Medal; Legion of Merit (3)

William Clyde Baker Jr. (May 9, 1904 – October 5, 1966) was a major general in the United States Army who served as the chief of staff of the 106th Infantry Division during World War II.

== Biography ==
Baker was born in Alexander, North Carolina,, on May 9, 1904. His family moved to Clinton, Tennessee when he was four years old.

Baker entered West Point, graduating in the class of 1926 as a 2nd Lt. Corps of Engineers. He attended Cornell University where he received his CE degree in 1928. On June 12, 1936 Baker was promoted to the rank of Captain.

After service with the Engineers at various posts and camps, Baker graduated from the Command and General Staff College in 1938. When the 106th Infantry Division was organized at Camp Jackson, South Carolina in March 1943 he was assigned as the Chief of Staff. He remained with the Division in that capacity during its whole active service. He was the only Chief the Division had. In September, 1945 when the Division was ordered back to the United States from Germany to be demobilized, he was transferred to other duty in Germany. He would only serve in the European theatre during World War II.

Baker also served in the Korean War as part of the Theater Army Support Command. In 1951, he would represent the Sixth Army, while serving as a Colonel, noting their role in logistics and hospitalizing the wounded from the war.

Baker retired after 30 year's service as a Major General on 31 May 1964.

After retiring from the military, Baker served as assistant to the secretary of the American Battle Monuments Commission.

Baker died in Walter Reed Army Hospital at the age of 62 late in the night of October 5, 1966. He was buried in Arlington National Cemetery. He was survived by his wife, mother, and son; all of whom still resided in his home in Clinton, Tennessee.

== Awards ==
Baker received the following awards:

Legion of Merit for outstanding service in World War II
Legion of Merit with an oak leaf cluster on January 30, 1948 for expectational service in the European theater
Legion of Merit with two oak leaf clusters for outstanding service as an Engineer in Korea from 1951 to 1953
Army Distinguished Service Medal for distinguished service, during the period of April 1953 to April 1964
