= Interstate 26 in North Carolina =

Highway in North Carolina, US

Interstate 26
- I-26 highlighted in red and Future I-26 highlighted in blue

Route information
- Maintained by NCDOT
- Length: 52.69 mi (84.80 km)
- Existed: 1966–present
- Tourist routes: I-26 Scenic Highway
- NHS: Entire route

Western segment
- West end: I-26 / US 23 at the Tennessee state line near Faust
- Major intersections: US 19 / US 23A near Mars Hill
- East end: US 19 / US 23 near Forks of Ivy

Eastern segment
- West end: I-40 / I-240 / US 74 in Asheville
- Major intersections: US 25 / US 25 Bus. in Fletcher; US 64 in Hendersonville; US 25 near East Flat Rock; US 74 in Columbus
- East end: I-26 at the South Carolina state line near Landrum, SC

Location
- Country: United States
- State: North Carolina
- Counties: Madison, Buncombe, Henderson, Polk

Highway system
- Interstate Highway System; Main; Auxiliary; Suffixed; Business; Future; North Carolina Highway System; Interstate; US; State; Scenic
← US 25	→ NC 27

Interstate 26 (I-26) in North Carolina runs through the western part of the state from the Tennessee border to the South Carolina border, following the Appalachian Mountains. It is part of the larger I-26, a regional Interstate that runs from Kingsport, Tennessee, to Charleston, South Carolina. I-26 is mostly four lanes through North Carolina with few exceptions. Though signed with east–west cardinal directions (because of the even number convention), in North Carolina and Tennessee, the route goes nearly north–south, with the northern direction labeled "West" and vice versa.

Within Madison County, I-26 is officially dedicated/memorialized as the Liston B. Ramsey Freeway on the section that over laps with US Highway 23 (US 23).

I-26's original western terminus was I-40/I-240 in Asheville. Between 2003 and 2005, the road was extended further north into Tennessee. Along the segment from Mars Hill to Asheville, there are future I-26 signs as some parts of the road have not yet been upgraded to Interstate Highway standards.

== Route description ==
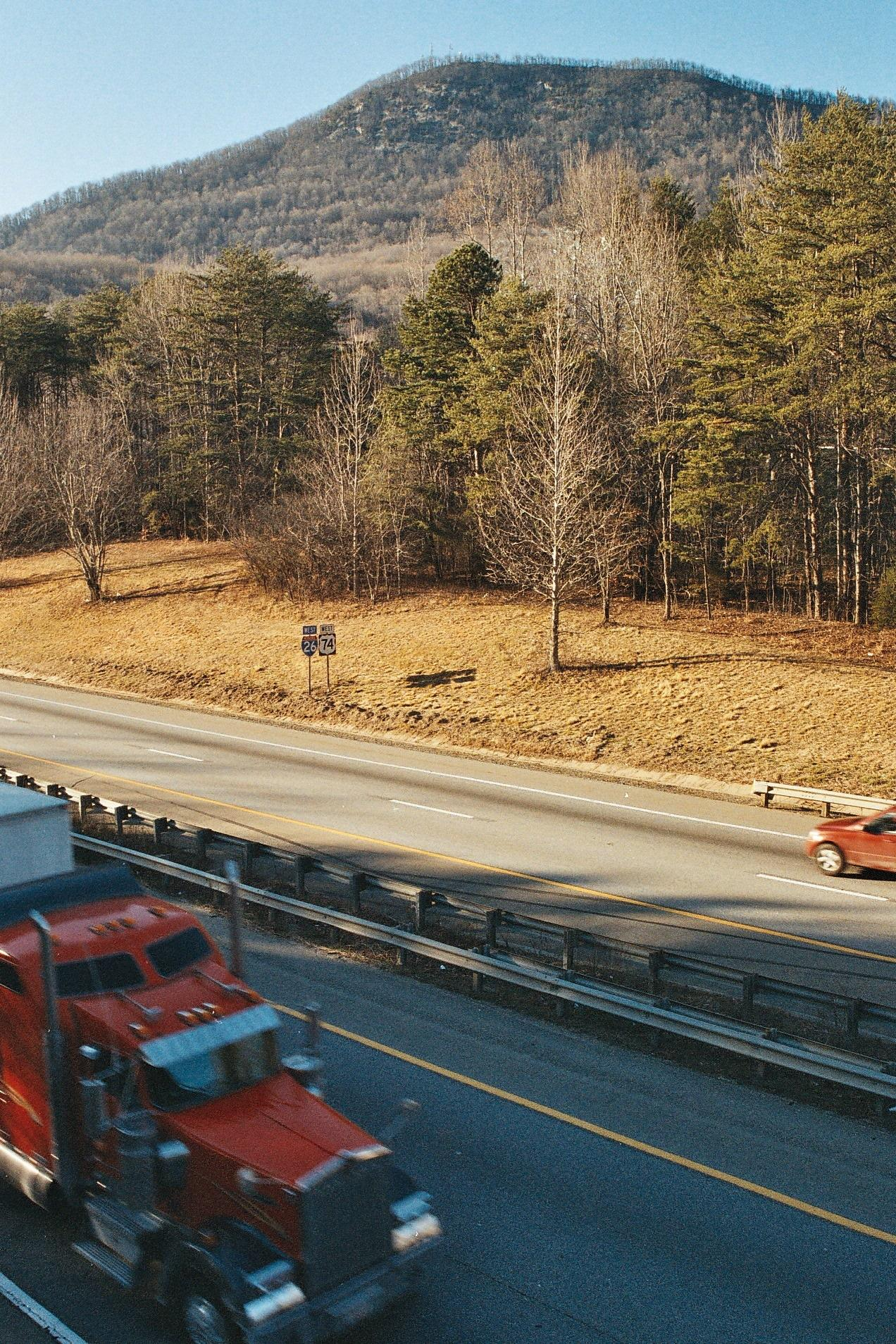
I-26 in Polk County looking over Skyuka Mountain

I-26, in concurrency with US 23, enters the state at Sams Gap (elevation 3,760 ft or 1,150 m) from Tennessee. In the first nine miles (14 km), designated as a scenic byway, it features mostly six travel lanes and three runaway truck ramps going eastbound. The freeway also parallels US 23A, which was the original route before 2006. At exit 13, I-26 ends and Future I-26 begins; US 19 also joins from Burnsville.

At Weaverville, Future I-26 merges with US 25/US 70, coming from Marshall; however, US 25 soon disembarks in Woodfin and continues south along Merrimon Avenue. Future I-26 enters Asheville, while parallel with the French Broad River, and merges with westbound I-240/US 74A with US 19/US 23; US 70 ends its concurrency by going eastbound I-240/US 74A instead and an additional exit at the major interchange provides access to downtown Asheville via Patton Avenue. It is signed I-26 proper again without future designation after merging with I-240, although NCDOT still officially refers to this segment as Future I-26.

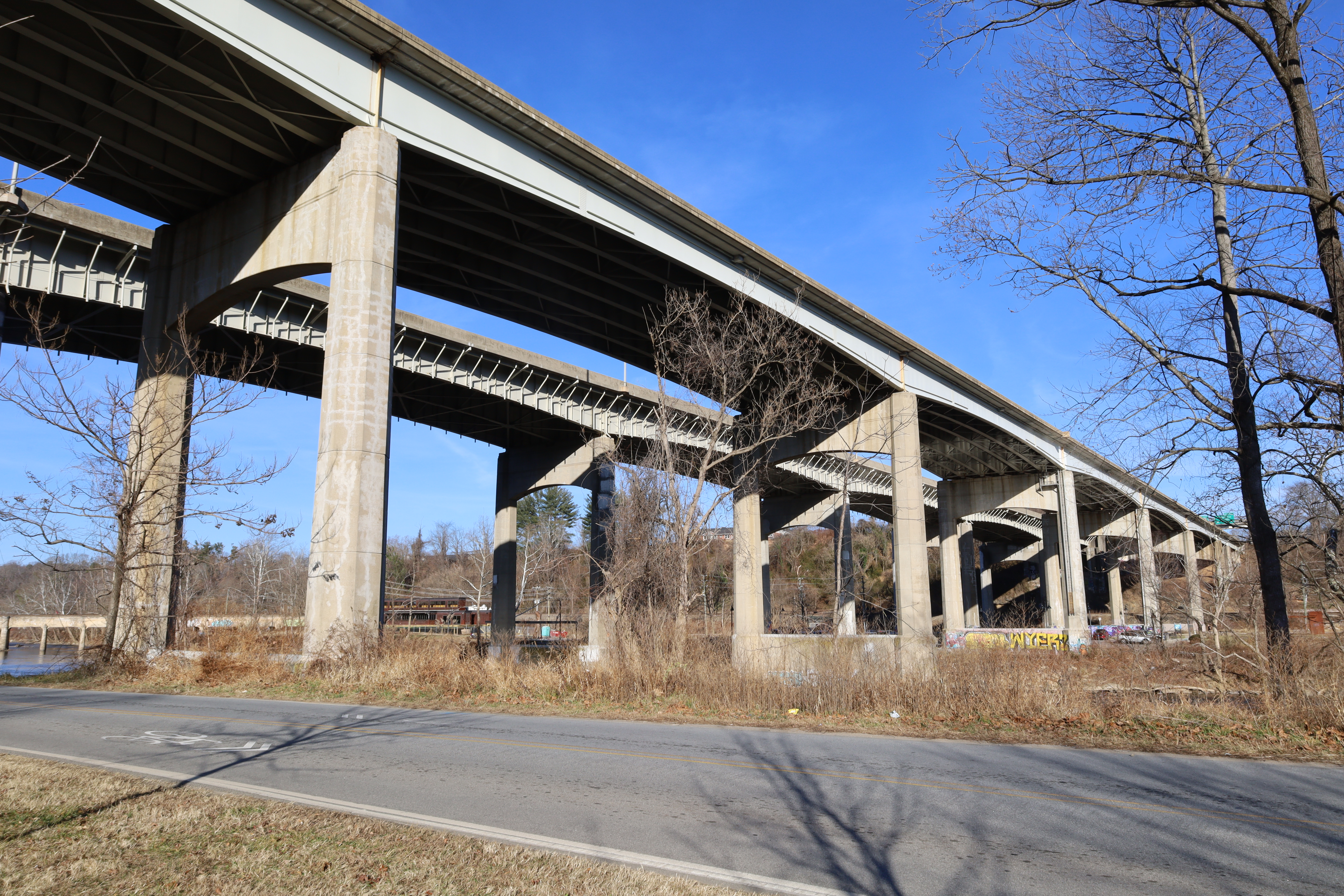
Interstates 26 and 240 cross the French Broad River over the Captain Jeff Bowen Bridge

Crossing the French Broad River along Capt. Jeff Bowen Bridge (originally Smokey Park Highway Bridge before 2012), I-26/I-240 promptly exit with two lanes to the right (same for both directions) while US 19/US 23/US 74A continue along Patton Avenue (exit 3). The interchange also features warning lights for "stopped traffic ahead", a common condition during rush hour. Between Patton Avenue (exit 3) and Haywood Road (exit 2), I-26/I-240 share a hidden concurrency with US 19 Business (US 19 Bus.)/US 23 Bus.

At the major interchange with I-40, sometimes called Malfunction Junction, I-240 ends, with new concurrency of I-26 with US 74. The interchange features left exit and entrances; while travelers along eastbound I-26/westbound I-240, access to eastbound I-40 is via North Carolina Highway 191 (NC 191, Brevard Road, exit 1). Westbound I-40/US 74 continues on to Canton and Knoxville; eastbound I-40 provides access to nearby Biltmore Estate and further on to Hickory.

Near milemarker 36, the Blue Ridge Parkway crosses over I-26 with a 75.1-foot (22.9 m) clearance; access to the Blue Ridge Parkway is via NC 191 (exit 33).

In Fletcher, I-26 goes by Asheville Regional Airport and accesses NC 280 to Brevard and Mills River (exit 40); 3.2 miles (5.1 km) later, US 25 rejoins (exit 44). In Hendersonville, it connects with US 64, which connect travelers to nearby Chimney Rock, Lake Lure, and Brevard. Between milemarkers 53 and 54, I-26 crosses the Eastern Continental Divide (elevation 2,130 ft or 650 m) at the County Road 1803 (CR 1803, Crest Road) overpass. Near East Flat Rock, US 25 separates again toward Greenville, South Carolina, while I-26 goes southeasterly down along Dodging Hill and crosses over the Green River along the Peter Guice Memorial Bridge, with a 235-foot (72 m) clearance from the river, making it the highest bridge in North Carolina.

At Howard Gap (elevation around 1,900 ft or 580 m), an additional truck lane is available on westbound I-26 for three miles (4.8 km). In Columbus, US 74 ends concurrency at exit 67, continuing east toward Shelby. At 71.4 miles (114.9 km), which combines I-26 and Future I-26, I-26 crosses the state line and into South Carolina.

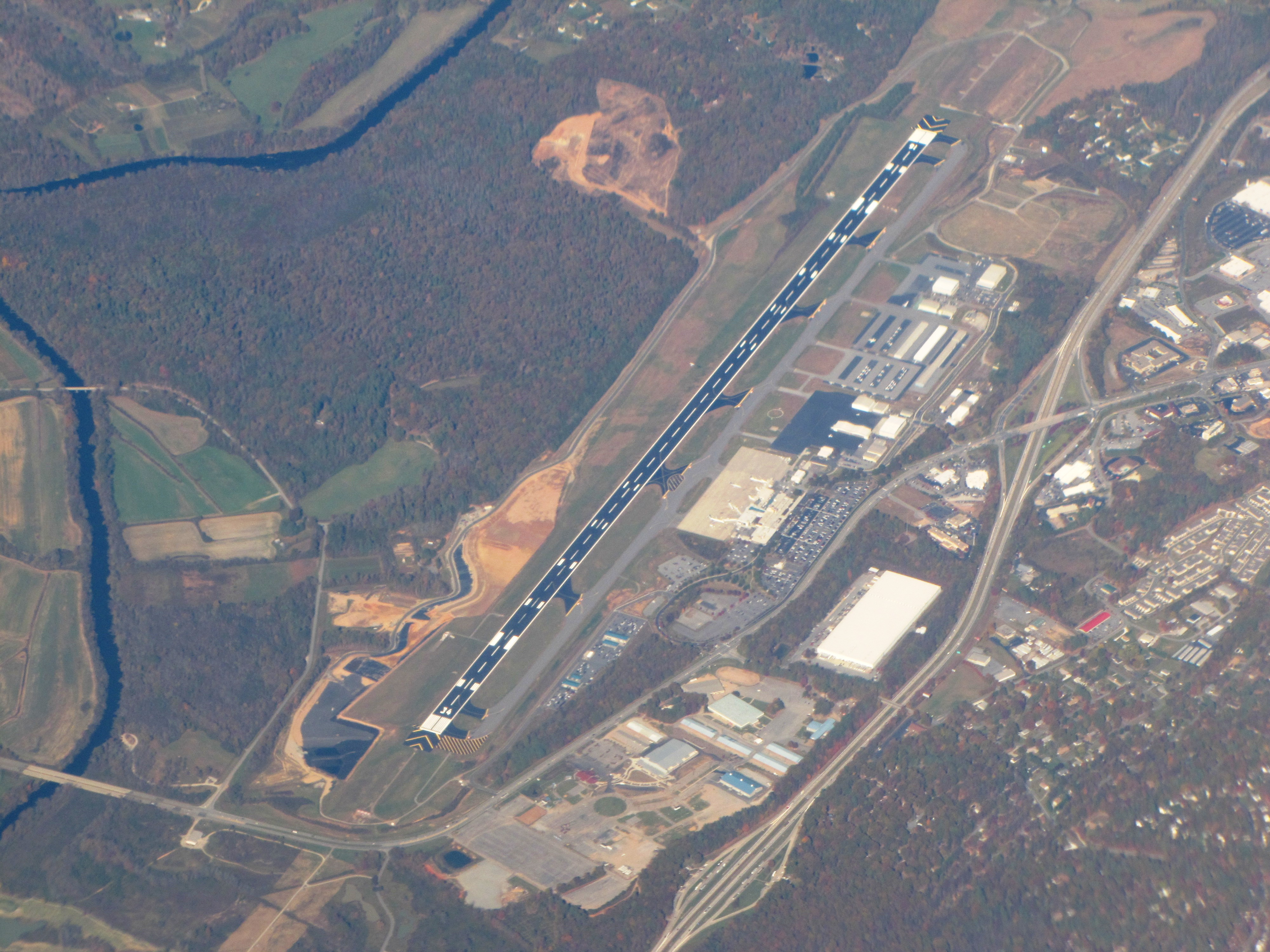
Aerial view of Asheville Regional Airport with I-26/US 74 on the right

I-26 also makes up part of Corridor B in the Appalachian Development Highway System (ADHS). Corridor B connects I-40, in Asheville with US 23, near Lucasville, Ohio; it overlaps nine miles (14 km) of I-26 and 22 miles (35 km) of Future I-26. The ADHS provides additional funds, as authorized by Congress, which have enabled I-26 to benefit from the successive improvements and widening along its routing within the corridor. The white-on-blue banner "Appalachian Highway" is used to mark the ADHS corridor.

I-26 overlaps with one state scenic byway simply known as the "I-26 Scenic Byway". Located from the Tennessee state line to exit 9 (US 19/US 23A) near Mars Hill. The byway is known for its unspoiled views of the North Carolina Mountains.

== History ==
I-26 appeared in the original Interstate Highway plans running from Charleston to Asheville. The road was first mapped as an under construction highway from US 25 near Hendersonville north to NC 280 (current NC 146). The first segment opened in 1966 beginning at NC 280 to the US 25 connector near East Flat Rock. In 1969, I-26 was extended north to I-40, and the South Carolina segment was extended to NC 108 near Columbus. In 1973, I-26 was extended from the US 25 connector to Saluda. Three years later, I-26 was connected. The segment from Saluda to NC 108 was completed. In late 2003, when the Madison County section opened, the Buncombe County section received the designation "Future I-26" because it did not meet Interstate standards. Starting in 2021, the section north of Asheville is scheduled for upgrades.

=== Building through Howard Gap ===
One of the hardest places to build I-26 was in Howard Gap. The work was delayed by numerous landslides along Miller Mountain and Tryon Peak. Special engineering had to be done to continue work on I-26 through the area. The most important part was controlling the soil and water on the mountains and surrounding areas. This was achieved through the installation of miles of underground pipe used to drain water from the road.

== Future ==
=== I-26 widening south of Asheville ===
In 2013, the North Carolina Department of Transportation (NCDOT) reopened the idea of widening I-26 from I-40, in Asheville, to US 25, near Flat Rock. The project had been planned 10 years earlier but was stopped by legal challenges. In 2015, it qualified and became part of the 2016–2025 State Transportation Improvement Program (STIP) and will cost $396 million to build. Right-of-way acquisition begins in 2018, with construction that was originally set to begin in 2020. Construction began sooner than that in October 2019, although it originally did not extend to US 25 in Flat Rock; it instead terminated at US 64 in Hendersonville. The widening south of US 64 to US 25 was added later. Part of the project, which is still ongoing, does call for the US 25/US 25 Bus. interchange near Naples to be converted into a diverging diamond interchange. Construction is projected to be completed by the Fall of 2026 at a cost of $531 million.

=== Asheville I-26 Connector ===
The I-26 Connector, estimated to cost $600–$800 million, will complete the missing gap of I-26 through Asheville. Initially, the project was broken into three sections, they were all planned and funded in the 2016–2025 STIP. Section A, between Haywood and Brevard roads, will be a widening project with reconfiguration of ramps at Haywood, Amboy, and Brevard roads. Section B, between north of Haywood Road to US 19/US 23/US 70, was the most expensive section of the project, at $332 million. After a review of various alternative designs, both state and federal agencies choose Alternative 4B, which will convert Patton Avenue along Bowen Bridges to local traffic and reroute I-240 along I-26 further north. Section C (Alternative F1), the I-26/I-240/I-40 interchange, will be reconfigured to include missing ramp connects and a widening of I-40 through the area. The approximately seven-mile (11 km) project was to begin with right-of-way acquisition in 2019, with construction on all three sections in 2021. However, this was delayed due to NCDOT having to make several refinements to the plans based on feedback from the community and the city of Asheville, and other stakeholders. This included bicycle and pedestrian improvements in the project and how to reduce the project impact to low-income and minority communities as well as historic properties.

The Final Environmental Impact Statement, which included a Traffic Noise Report, was finally released in January 2020. However, further refinements were made after that. In June 2021, another Section (Section D), which will improve Riverside Drive, was added to the project. In May 2022, section A was subdivided into three more sections (AA, AB, and AC) after more improvements to I-40 were added. The estimated cost increased to $1.2 billion in 2023. The final record of decision was approved in Spring 2023 and right-of-way acquisition for all of Section A began at that time. In Fall 2023, construction of Sections AA and AB began and contracts for Sections B and D were rewarded. Construction for Section AC will begin in early 2024. Currently, preliminary engineering activities have begun for Section C, but construction has been delayed because it was not included in the state's 2024-2033 STIP. A timeline will be put in place once the project is reprioritized.

The final contract for Section B, awarded to Archer–Wright Joint Venture, totalled $1.15 billion, the largest contract in the state's history. The design was selected May 15, 2024. Groundbreaking occurred on April 23, 2026.

=== Future I-26 north of Asheville ===
Another project, between Broadway Avenue and the US 19/US 23A interchanges, will be upgraded to Interstate standards by replacing bridges, expanding the highway width and adding shoulders. The project, needed so I-26 can fully be labeled along that stretch, is currently in development. The initial cost was to be $99 million, with right-of-way acquisition starting in 2020 and construction in 2022. Delays included state money and worries over how neighborhoods would be affected. Contracts are to be awarded in 2023 and 2024 and construction to take three to five years. The current cost of the project is over $200 million.

== Exit list ==
County	Location	mi	km	Old exit	New exit	Destinations	Notes
Madison		0.0	0.0			I-26 west / US 23 north – Johnson City	Continuation into Tennessee; crosses through Sam's Gap
Madison		3.4	5.5		3	US 23A south – Wolf Laurel	
Madison		9.0	14.5		9	US 19 north / US 23A north – Burnsville, Spruce Pine	North end of US 19 overlap
Madison	Mars Hill	10.9	17.5		11	NC 213 – Mars Hill, Marshall	
Buncombe		13.2	21.2		13	Forks of Ivy	
Buncombe		13.2	21.2	Route transition from I-26 to Future I-26			
Buncombe	Flat Creek				15	NC 197 – Jupiter, Barnardsville	Existing interchanges of US 19/US 23 (upgrade to interstate standards, funded)
Buncombe	Stocksville				17	Flat Creek	Existing interchanges of US 19/US 23 (upgrade to interstate standards, funded)
Buncombe	Weaverville				18	US 19 Bus. south / Monticello Road – Weaverville	Existing interchanges of US 19/US 23 (upgrade to interstate standards, funded)
Buncombe	Weaverville				19	US 25 north / US 70 west – Marshall, Weaverville	Existing interchanges of US 19/US 23 (upgrade to interstate standards, funded)
Buncombe	Weaverville				21	New Stock Road – Weaverville	Existing interchanges of US 19/US 23 (upgrade to interstate standards, funded)
Buncombe	Woodfin				23	US 25 south / US 19 Bus. north (Merrimon Avenue) – Woodfin, North Asheville	Existing interchanges of US 19/US 23 (upgrade to interstate standards, funded)
Buncombe	Woodfin				24	Elk Mountain Road Woodfin	Existing interchanges of US 19/US 23 (upgrade to interstate standards, funded)
Buncombe	Asheville				25	NC 251 – UNC Asheville	Existing interchanges of US 19/US 23 (upgrade to interstate standards, funded)
Buncombe	Asheville				26	Hill Street	Existing interchanges of US 19/US 23 (upgrade to interstate standards, funded)
Buncombe	Asheville					I-240 / US 70 / US 74A east / Patton Avenue	Existing interchanges of I-240 (realign and upgrade to interstate standards, funded)
Buncombe	Asheville				3B	Westgate / Resort Drive	Existing interchanges of I-240 (realign and upgrade to interstate standards, funded)
Buncombe	Asheville				3A	US 19 / US 23 south / US 74A west (Patton Avenue) US 19 Bus. / US 23 Bus. begin	Existing interchanges of I-240 (realign and upgrade to interstate standards, funded)
Buncombe	Asheville				2	US 19 Bus. / US 23 Bus. south (Haywood Street) – West Asheville	Existing interchanges of I-240 (realign and upgrade to interstate standards, funded)
Buncombe	Asheville				1C	Amboy Road	Existing interchanges of I-240 (realign and upgrade to interstate standards, funded)
Buncombe	Asheville				1B	NC 191 (Brevard Road) to I-40	Existing interchanges of I-240 (realign and upgrade to interstate standards, funded)
Buncombe	Asheville			Route transition from Future I-26 to I-26			
Buncombe	Asheville	31.4	50.5	1B	31B	I-40 west / US 74 west – Canton, Knoxville	West end of I-240 / US 74 overlap
Buncombe	Asheville	31.9	51.3	1A	31A	I-40 east – Hickory, Biltmore Estate	Westbound exit and eastbound entrance
Buncombe	Asheville	33.0	53.1	2	33	NC 191 to Blue Ridge Parkway	To Tanger Outlets Asheville
Buncombe						Frederick Law Olmsted Way East	Future interchange
Buncombe		37.7	60.7	6	37	NC 146 / Long Shoals Road – Skyland	
Buncombe	Arden	40.8	65.7	9	40	NC 280 – Asheville Regional Airport, Arden, Brevard	To WNC Agriculture Center, Diverging diamond interchange
Henderson	Fletcher	44.1	71.0	13	44	US 25 north / US 25 Bus. south – Fletcher, Mountain Home	North end of US 25 overlap, Diverging diamond interchange
Henderson	Hendersonville	49.9	80.3	18	49	US 64 – Hendersonville, Bat Cave	Signed as exits 49A (east) and 49B (west)
Henderson	Hendersonville	53.4	85.9	22	53	Upward Road – Hendersonville	
Henderson		54.4	87.5	23	54	US 25 south to US 176 / NC 225 – Greenville	South end of US 25 overlap; to Carl Sandburg Home and Flat Rock Playhouse
Henderson	Green River	56.5	90.9	Peter Guice Memorial Bridge			
Polk	Saluda	59.6	95.9	28	59	Saluda	
Polk	Columbus	66.6	107.2		66	US 74 east – Forest City, Shelby	Westbound exit
Polk	Columbus	67.1	108.0	36	67	US 74 east / NC 108 – Columbus, Rutherfordton, Tryon	East end of US 74 overlap
Polk		71.4	114.9			I-26 east – Spartanburg	Continuation into South Carolina
1.000 mi = 1.609 km; 1.000 km = 0.621 mi: Concurrency terminus; Incomplete access; Route transition; Unopened

== See also ==
- Biltmore Estate
- French Broad River
- Pisgah National Forest

Interstate 26
Previous state: Tennessee	North Carolina	Next state: South Carolina
