= Buncombe County, North Carolina =

County in North Carolina, United States

- County
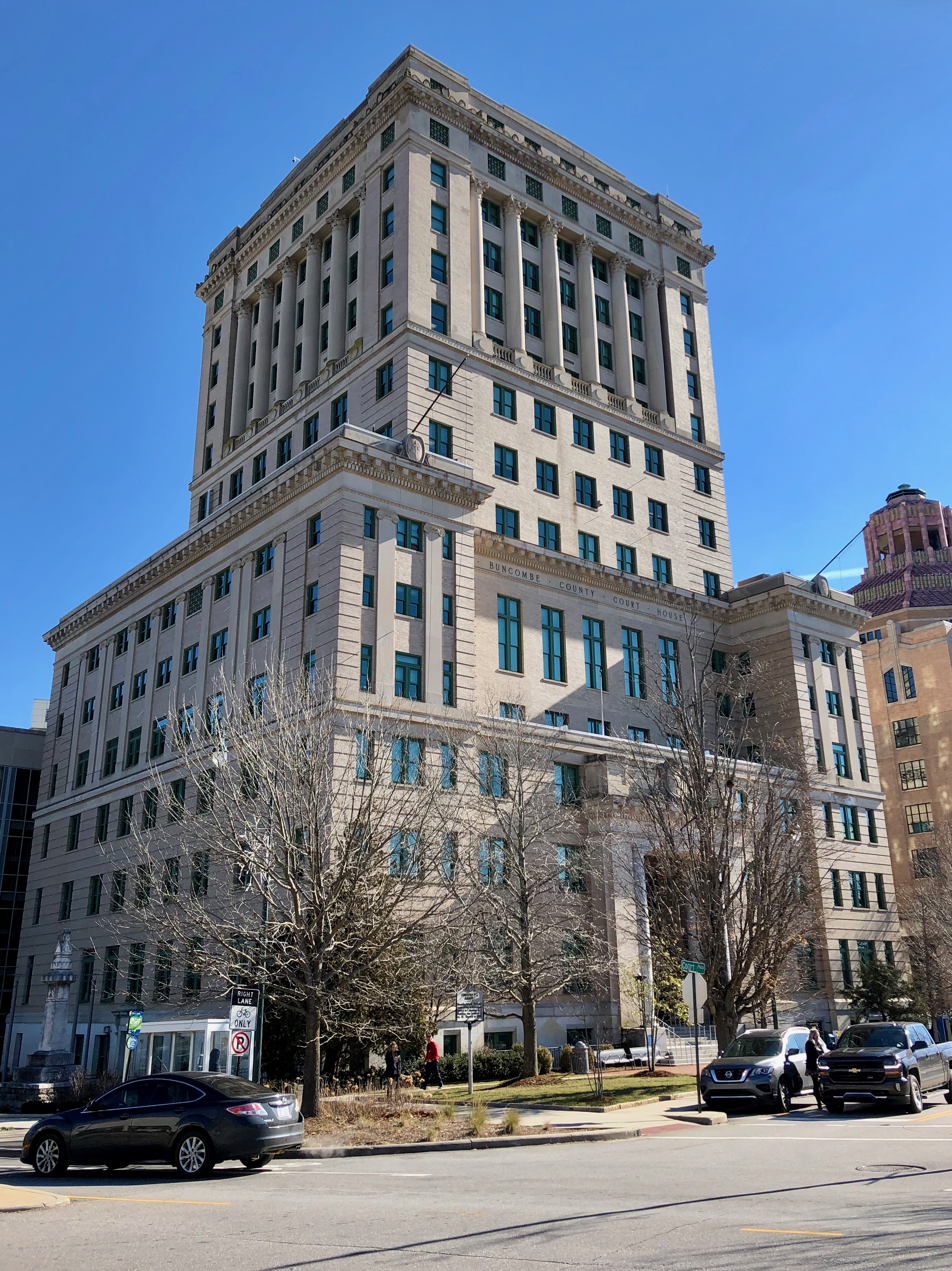
- Buncombe County Courthouse in Asheville

- Flag Seal Logo
- Motto: "People To Match Our Mountains"
- Location within the U.S. state of North Carolina
- Interactive map of Buncombe County, North Carolina
- Coordinates: 35.61°N 82.53°W
- Country: United States
- State: North Carolina
- Founded: 1792
- Named for: Edward Buncombe
- Seat: Asheville
- Largest city: Asheville

Area
  - Total: 659.95 sq mi (1,709.3 km^{2})
  - Land: 656.50 sq mi (1,700.3 km^{2})
  - Water: 3.45 sq mi (8.9 km^{2}) 0.52%

Population (2020)
  - Total: 269,452
  - Estimate (2025): 277,417 ▲
  - Density: 410.37/sq mi (158.44/km^{2})
- Time zone: UTC−5 (Eastern)
  - Summer (DST): UTC−4 (EDT)
- Congressional district: 11th
- Website: buncombenc.gov

Buncombe County (/ˈbʌŋkəm/ BUNK-um) is a county located in the U.S. state of North Carolina. It is classified within Western North Carolina. The 2020 census reported the population was 269,452, making it the 7th-most populous county in North Carolina. Its county seat is Asheville. Buncombe County is part of the Asheville, NC Metropolitan Statistical Area.

== History ==
The area of modern-day Buncombe County and its environs was originally populated by the Anigiduwagi, better known as the Cherokee people. Europeans, primarily of German, Scottish and English descent, began to live in Buncombe in the early 18th century. Some of the earliest permanent European settlers in Buncombe arrived in 1784. These European settlers frequently broke their treaties with the Cherokee, gradually dispelling them from their land in Buncombe County by force.

In 1791, Colonel William Davidson and David Vance petitioned the North Carolina House of Commons to create a new county in the western part of the state from parts of Burke and Rutherford counties. The proposal named the county as "Union County". In January 1792, the proposed new county was officially created and named after Edward Buncombe, a colonel in the American Revolutionary War . Locals referred to this area as “the state of Buncombe” due to it being so large. The original county would be split into eleven counties total. The first meeting of the county government took place in April 1792 in Colonel Davidson's barn (located on the present-day Biltmore Estate).

In December 1792 and April 1793, the county seat of Buncombe came under dispute. Commissioner John Dillard assisted with the resolution. The original documentation for the creation of Buncombe County proposed a committee of five persons to select the county seat. A dispute arose between two factions of Buncombe County residents on opposite sides of the Swannanoa River, one faction pressing for the county seat to be north of Swannanoa, which is now the center of Asheville, and the other faction demanding it to be at a place south of Swannanoa River, which later became known as the "Steam Saw Mill Place", and is now the southern part of the city of Asheville.

In December 1792, seven men met to select a courthouse location for the county. The desire was to have a courthouse closer to the community than Morganton, the closest place to record deeds at the time, due to the travel to Morganton being so laborious. The first courthouse was built at the present-day Pack Square site in Asheville.

As the population of Buncombe County increased, parts of the county were reallocated to new counties. In 1808, the western part of Buncombe County became Haywood County. In 1833, parts of Burke and Buncombe counties were combined to form Yancey County. In 1838, the southern part of what was left of Buncombe County became Henderson County. In 1851, parts of Buncombe and Yancey counties were combined to form Madison County. Finally, in 1925 the Broad River township of McDowell County was transferred to Buncombe County.

In 1820, a U.S. Congressman whose district included Buncombe County, unintentionally contributed a word to the English language. In the Sixteenth Congress, after lengthy debate on the Missouri Compromise, members of the House called for an immediate vote on that important question. Felix Walker rose to address his colleagues, insisting that his constituents expected him to make a speech "for Buncombe." It was later remarked that Walker's untimely and irrelevant oration was not just for Buncombe—it "was Buncombe." Buncombe, afterwards spelled bunkum and later shortened to bunk, became a term for empty, nonsensical talk. That, in turn, is the etymology of the verb debunk.

On June 16, 2020, Buncombe County Commissioners decided to remove several Confederate monuments including the Vance Monument which is named after North Carolina governor Zeb Vance, a slave owner who used convict labor to build the railroad to Western North Carolina.

In September 2024, Hurricane Helene caused catastrophic, record-breaking flooding throughout Buncombe County and Western North Carolina. 47 deaths were recorded in Buncombe County as a result of the storm, the most of any county in the US. Prior to the storm, the county was classified by FEMA as being at low risk of deadly hurricanes.

== Geography ==
According to the U.S. Census Bureau, Buncombe county has a total area of 659.95 square miles (1,709.3 km^{2}), of which 656.50 square miles (1,700.3 km^{2}) is land and 3.45 square miles (8.9 km^{2}) (0.52%) is water.

The French Broad River enters the county at its border with Henderson County to the south and flows north into Madison County. The source of the Swannanoa River, which joins the French Broad River in Asheville, is in northeast Buncombe County near Mount Mitchell, a part of the Black Mountains range. Mt. Mitchell is the highest point in the eastern United States at 6,684 ft. Its summit lies in adjacent Yancey County; the highest point in Buncombe County is Potato Knob, at 6400+ feet, which lies a short distance south of Mount Mitchell.

A milestone was achieved in 2003 when Interstate 26, still called Future I-26 in northern Buncombe County, was extended from Mars Hill (north of Asheville) to Johnson City, Tennessee. This completed a 20-year, half-billion dollar construction project through the Blue Ridge Mountains.

=== National protected areas ===
- Blue Ridge Parkway (part)
- Craggy Gardens
- Pisgah National Forest (part)
- Mount Pisgah (part)
- Nantahala National Forest (part)

=== State and local protected areas/sites ===
- Asheville Watershed
- Beaver Lake Bird Sanctuary
- Big Ivy Historical Park
- Biltmore Estate
- Chimney Rock State Park (part)
- Collier Cove Nature Preserve
- The North Carolina Arboretum
- Pisgah National Forest Game Land (part)
- Pisgah View State Park (part)
- Sandy Mush Game Land (part)
- Thomas Wolfe House
- Vance Birthplace
- Western North Carolina Nature Center
- Young Forest

=== Major water bodies ===
- Beaver Lake
- Beaverdam Creek
- Bent Creek
- Broad River
- Burnett Reservoir
- Cane Creek
- Flat Creek
- French Broad River
- Lake Ashnoca
- Lake Julian
- Lake Kenilworth
- Lake Craig
- Lake Powhatan
- Lake Louise
- Left Fork Swannanoa River
- Little Pole Creek
- Long Valley Lake
- Newfound Creek
- North Fork Reservoir
- North Fork Swannanoa River
- Pole Creek
- Reems Creek
- Right Fork Swannanoa River
- Swannanoa River
- Tom Creek
- Turkey Creek

=== Adjacent counties ===
- Madison County – north
- Yancey County – northeast
- McDowell County – east
- Rutherford County – southeast
- Henderson County – south
- Transylvania County – southwest
- Haywood County – west

=== Major highways ===
- I-26 / Future I-26 (small section undesignated)
- I-40
- I-240
- US 19
- US 23
- US 23 Bus.
- US 23 Bus.
- US 25
- US 25A
- US 64 Truck
- US 70
- US 74
- US 74A
- NC 9
- NC 63
- NC 81
- NC 112
- NC 146
- NC 151
- NC 191
- NC 197
- NC 251
- NC 280
- NC 694
- Blue Ridge Parkway

=== Major infrastructure ===
- Asheville Regional Airport

== Demographics ==
Historical population
Census	Pop.	Note	%±
1800	5,812		—
1810	9,277		59.6%
1820	10,542		13.6%
1830	16,281		54.4%
1840	10,084		−38.1%
1850	13,425		33.1%
1860	12,654		−5.7%
1870	15,412		21.8%
1880	21,909		42.2%
1890	35,266		61.0%
1900	44,288		25.6%
1910	49,798		12.4%
1920	64,148		28.8%
1930	97,937		52.7%
1940	108,755		11.0%
1950	124,403		14.4%
1960	130,074		4.6%
1970	145,056		11.5%
1980	160,934		10.9%
1990	174,821		8.6%
2000	206,330		18.0%
2010	238,318		15.5%
2020	269,452		13.1%
2025 (est.)	277,417	▲	3.0%
U.S. Decennial Census; 1790–1960 1900–1990; 1990–2000 2010 2020

Since 1970, the county has had a steady rise in population, attracting retirees, second-home buyers and others from outside the region.

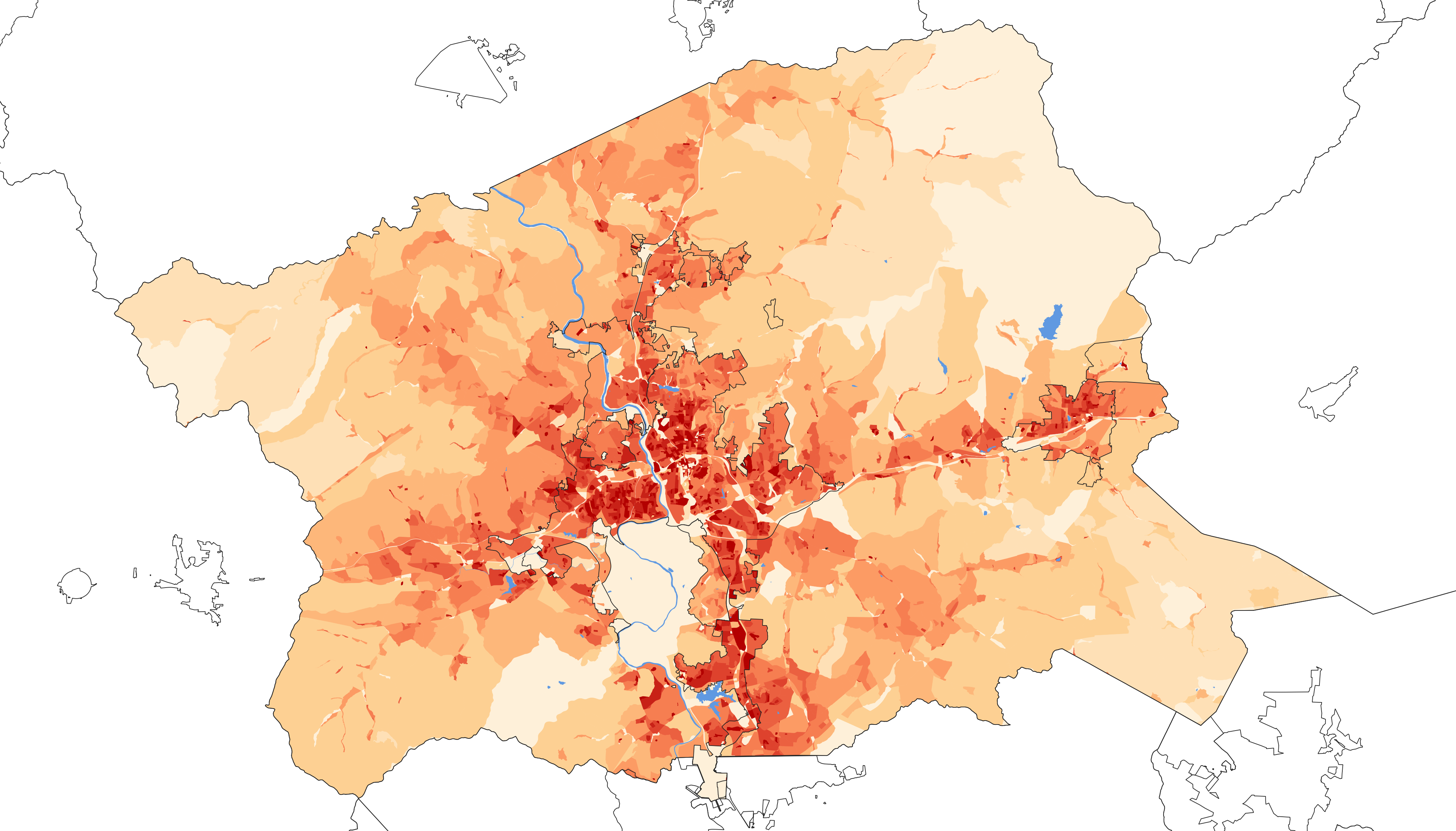
2020 population density of Buncombe County NC by census block

=== Racial and ethnic composition ===
Buncombe County, North Carolina – Racial and ethnic composition Note: the US Census treats Hispanic/Latino as an ethnic category. This table excludes Latinos from the racial categories and assigns them to a separate category. Hispanics/Latinos may be of any race.
Race / Ethnicity (NH = Non-Hispanic)	Pop 1980	Pop 1990	Pop 2000	Pop 2010	Pop 2020	% 1980	% 1990	% 2000	% 2010	% 2020
White alone (NH)	145,243	158,117	180,721	201,241	214,862	90.25%	90.45%	87.59%	84.44%	79.74%
Black or African American alone (NH)	13,852	14,279	15,310	14,979	15,017	8.61%	8.17%	7.42%	6.29%	5.57%
Native American or Alaska Native alone (NH)	299	479	748	778	727	0.19%	0.27%	0.36%	0.33%	0.27%
Asian alone (NH)	335	745	1,354	2,388	3,274	0.21%	0.43%	0.66%	1.00%	1.22%
Native Hawaiian or Pacific Islander alone (NH)	x	x	77	271	467	x	x	0.04%	0.11%	0.17%
Other race alone (NH)	169	28	221	335	1,382	0.11%	0.02%	0.11%	0.14%	0.51%
Mixed race or Multiracial (NH)	x	x	2,169	4,072	11,801	x	x	1.05%	1.71%	4.38%
Hispanic or Latino (any race)	1,036	1,173	5,730	14,254	21,922	0.64%	0.67%	2.78%	5.98%	8.14%
Total	160,934	174,821	206,330	238,318	269,452	100.00%	100.00%	100.00%	100.00%	100.00%

=== 2020 census ===
As of the 2020 census, there were 269,452 people, 116,237 households, and 63,675 families residing in the county. From 2010 to 2020, Buncombe County added 31,104 people or 13.0% population growth, making it the fastest growing county in Western North Carolina during the decade.

The median age was 42.1 years; 18.4% of residents were under the age of 18 and 20.6% were 65 years of age or older. For every 100 females there were 92.8 males, and for every 100 females age 18 and over there were 90.5 males age 18 and over.

The racial makeup of the county was 81.2% White, 5.7% Black or African American, 0.5% American Indian and Alaska Native, 1.2% Asian, 0.2% Native Hawaiian and Pacific Islander, 4.2% from some other race, and 7.0% from two or more races. Hispanic or Latino residents of any race comprised 8.1% of the population.

77.7% of residents lived in urban areas, while 22.3% lived in rural areas.

There were 116,237 households in the county, of which 24.3% had children under the age of 18 living in them. Of all households, 43.0% were married-couple households, 19.1% were households with a male householder and no spouse or partner present, and 29.6% were households with a female householder and no spouse or partner present. About 31.8% of all households were made up of individuals and 13.2% had someone living alone who was 65 years of age or older.

There were 129,141 housing units, of which 10.0% were vacant. Among occupied housing units, 62.9% were owner-occupied and 37.1% were renter-occupied. The homeowner vacancy rate was 1.3% and the rental vacancy rate was 6.8%.

=== 2000 census ===
At the 2000 census, there were 206,330 people, 85,776 households, and 55,668 families residing in the county. The population density was 314 people per square mile (121 people/km^{2}). There were 93,973 housing units at an average density of 143 units per square mile (55 units/km^{2}). The racial makeup of the county was 89.06% White, 7.48% Black or African American, 0.39% Native American, 0.66% Asian, 0.04% Pacific Islander, 1.15% from other races, and 1.23% from two or more races. 2.78% of the population were Hispanic or Latino of any race.

There were 85,776 households, out of which 27.50% had children under the age of 18 living with them, 50.50% were married couples living together, 10.80% had a female householder with no husband present, and 35.10% were non-families. Of all households 28.90% were made up of individuals, and 10.60% had someone living alone who was 65 years of age or older. The average household size was 2.33 and the average family size was 2.86.

In the county, the population was spread out, with 21.90% under the age of 18, 8.60% from 18 to 24, 29.30% from 25 to 44, 24.80% from 45 to 64, and 15.40% who were 65 years of age or older. The median age was 39 years. For every 100 females there were 92.30 males. For every 100 females age 18 and over, there were 88.90 males.

The median income for a household in the county was $36,666, and the median income for a family was $45,011. Males had a median income of $30,705 versus $23,870 for females. The per capita income for the county was $20,384. About 7.80% of families and 11.40% of the population were below the poverty line, including 15.30% of those under age 18 and 9.80% of those age 65 or over.

== Law, government, and politics ==
=== Local government ===
Buncombe County is a member of the Land-of-Sky Regional Council of governments. Buncombe County has a commission-manager form of government. Commissioners are selected via partisan elections to serve four-year terms representing one of three districts. In addition to a chair, each district has two representatives on the commission. Current commissioners are Amanda Edwards (chair), Al Whitesides (District 1), Jennifer Horton (District 1), Terri Wells (District 2), Martin Moore (District 2), Parker Sloan (District 3), and Drew Ball (District 3). Avril Pinder is the County Manager.

Buncombe County Public Libraries has 11 branch locations, with a central location at Pack Memorial Library in downtown Asheville.

There are two public school systems within Buncombe County, including Buncombe County Schools and Asheville City Schools as well as many private schools and charter schools. There are four colleges in Buncombe County, including Asheville-Buncombe Technical Community College, University of North Carolina at Asheville, Montreat College, and Warren Wilson College.

==== Sheriff's Office and policing ====
The Buncombe County Sheriff provides court protection and jail administration for the entire county and provides patrol and detective services for the unincorporated areas of the county. The Sheriff's Office is organized into six divisions: Enforcement, Detention, Animal Control, Support Operations, School Resources, Civil Process. The current Sheriff is Quentin Miller who was elected in 2018.

Asheville has a municipal police department. As of 2026, Jackie Stepp is serving as the interim police chief. The municipalities of Black Mountain, Biltmore Forest, Montreat, Weaverville, and Woodfin also have municipal police departments, and UNC Asheville and Montreat College have campus police departments. The NC State Highway Patrol Troop G regional headquarters is located in east Asheville.

=== State politics ===
As of 2023, in the North Carolina Senate, Julie Mayfield (D–49th) and Warren Daniel (R–46th) both represent parts of Buncombe County. Mayfield represents most of the county including Asheville and the west side. Daniel represents a portion of the east side of the county as well as McDowell and Burke counties.

In the North Carolina House of Representatives, Eric Ager (D–114th), Lindsey Prather (D–115th), and Caleb Rudow (D–116th) each represent part of the county.

=== Federal politics ===
Buncombe had long been a bellwether county in presidential elections. It voted for the winning candidate in all but one election from 1928 until 2012, with the exception being 1960.

Since 2008, the county has trended strongly toward the Democratic Party. It swung from a 0.6 point win for George W. Bush to a 14-point win for Barack Obama in 2008, and has gone Democratic by double-digit margins at every election since then. When Donald Trump won the electoral college (and the election) after losing the popular vote, the county lost its bellwether status. In 2024, Kamala Harris achieved the strongest performance by a Democrat in the county since Franklin Roosevelt's 1944 landslide. Despite losing North Carolina overall, she pushed the county two points further to the left.

North Carolina is represented in the United States Senate by Republicans Ted Budd and Thom Tillis, from Advance and Huntersville, respectively. All of the county is located in North Carolina's 11th congressional district, which is currently held by Republican Chuck Edwards.

United States presidential election results for Buncombe County, North Carolina
Year	Republican		Democratic		Third party(ies)	
Year	No.	%	No.	%	No.	%
1880	1,591	44.37%	1,995	55.63%	0	0.00%
1884	2,007	42.87%	2,649	56.58%	26	0.56%
1888	2,873	48.29%	2,956	49.68%	121	2.03%
1892	3,125	44.18%	3,588	50.73%	360	5.09%
1896	4,611	52.80%	4,098	46.93%	24	0.27%
1900	4,140	52.41%	3,724	47.15%	35	0.44%
1904	2,591	44.70%	3,181	54.88%	24	0.41%
1908	3,572	50.03%	3,506	49.10%	62	0.87%
1912	426	6.53%	3,716	56.92%	2,386	36.55%
1916	3,830	47.52%	4,229	52.48%	0	0.00%
1920	8,017	44.09%	10,167	55.91%	0	0.00%
1924	6,285	37.30%	10,098	59.93%	467	2.77%
1928	16,590	57.22%	12,405	42.78%	0	0.00%
1932	8,745	31.97%	18,241	66.69%	367	1.34%
1936	9,470	28.60%	23,646	71.40%	0	0.00%
1940	8,723	25.96%	24,878	74.04%	0	0.00%
1944	9,398	31.04%	20,878	68.96%	0	0.00%
1948	11,460	37.15%	17,072	55.34%	2,319	7.52%
1952	24,444	52.15%	22,425	47.85%	0	0.00%
1956	22,655	54.33%	19,044	45.67%	0	0.00%
1960	28,040	54.61%	23,303	45.39%	0	0.00%
1964	19,372	37.99%	31,623	62.01%	0	0.00%
1968	21,031	44.23%	14,624	30.76%	11,889	25.01%
1972	32,091	70.38%	12,626	27.69%	877	1.92%
1976	22,461	45.49%	26,633	53.94%	285	0.58%
1980	26,124	48.80%	24,837	46.40%	2,569	4.80%
1984	37,698	61.62%	23,337	38.14%	148	0.24%
1988	36,828	57.55%	26,964	42.14%	200	0.31%
1992	30,892	40.92%	32,955	43.65%	11,645	15.43%
1996	30,518	44.19%	31,658	45.84%	6,891	9.98%
2000	46,101	53.93%	38,545	45.09%	830	0.97%
2004	52,491	49.99%	51,868	49.39%	654	0.62%
2008	52,494	42.40%	69,716	56.32%	1,585	1.28%
2012	54,701	42.84%	70,625	55.31%	2,370	1.86%
2016	55,716	40.10%	75,452	54.30%	7,779	5.60%
2020	62,412	38.63%	96,515	59.74%	2,642	1.64%
2024	59,016	36.77%	98,662	61.47%	2,832	1.76%

== Economy ==
The North Carolina Department of Commerce reported that in September 2024 Buncombe County had the lowest unemployment rate of all of North Carolina's counties at a rate of 2.5 percent. In the aftermath of Hurricane Helene's impacts on the region, in October the department reported that Buncombe had the highest rate of unemployment in the state at 8.8 percent.

== Communities ==
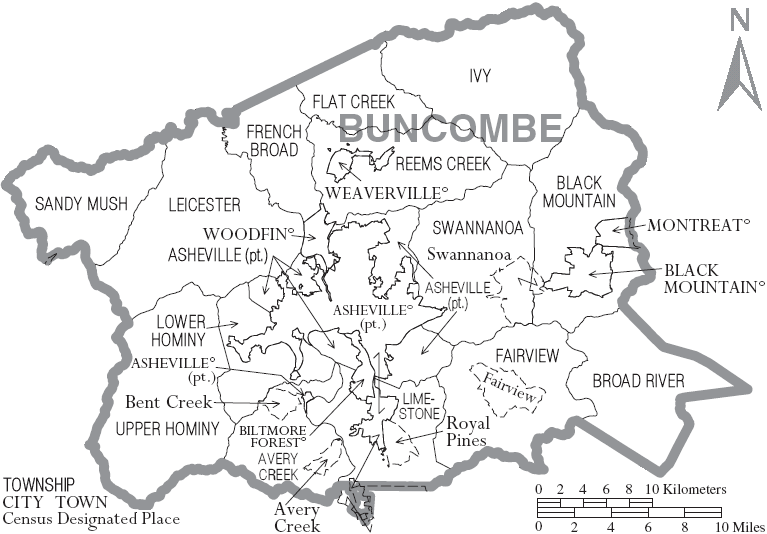
Map of Buncombe County with municipal and township labels

=== City ===
- Asheville (county seat and largest municipality)

=== Towns ===
- Biltmore Forest
- Black Mountain
- Montreat
- Weaverville
- Woodfin

=== Townships ===
- Asheville
- Avery Creek
- Black Mountain
- Broad River
- Fairview
- Flat Creek
- French Broad
- Hazel
- Ivy
- Leicester
- Limestone
- Lower Hominy
- Reems Creek
- Sandy Mush
- Swannanoa
- Weaverville
- Woodfin
- Upper Hominy

=== Census-designated places ===
- Avery Creek
- Barnardsville
- Bent Creek
- Emma
- Fairview
- Royal Pines
- Swannanoa

=== Unincorporated communities ===
- Alexander
- Arden
- Beaverdam
- Candler
- Coburn
- Enka
- Flat Creek
- Forks of Ivy
- Jupiter
- Leicester
- Oak Park
- Ridgecrest
- Sandymush
- Skyland
- Stocksville
- Wilson

== Religion ==
Many of the early settlers were Baptists. In 1807 the pastors of six churches, including the revivalist Sion Blythe, formed the French Broad Association of Baptist churches in the area.

== See also ==
- List of counties in North Carolina
- National Register of Historic Places listings in Buncombe County, North Carolina
- USS Buncombe County (LST-510)
