= North Carolina Highway 146 =

State highway in Buncombe County, North Carolina, US

North Carolina Highway 146
- Long Shoals Road

Route information
- Maintained by NCDOT
- Length: 3.485 mi (5.609 km)
- Existed: 1991–present

Major junctions
- West end: NC 191 in Avery Creek
- I-26 / US 74 west of Skyland
- East end: US 25 in Asheville

Location
- Country: United States
- State: North Carolina
- Counties: Buncombe

Highway system
- North Carolina Highway System; Interstate; US; State; Scenic
← NC 145	→ NC 147

North Carolina Highway 146 (NC 146) is a short east/west state highway in western North Carolina and lies entirely in Buncombe County, south of downtown Asheville. It is named Long Shoals Road for its entire length.

== Route description ==
NC 146 begins its western end at NC 191 in the community of Avery Creek a census-designated place (CDP) south of Asheville. NC 146 travels east and at just over 1.5 miles (2.4 km), immediately after crossing the French Broad River, intersects Interstate 26/U.S. 74 at exit 37. Passing exit 37, NC 146 enters the Asheville city limits and passes north of Lake Julian and Julian Lake Park before nearing its eastern end. At 3.51 miles (5.65 km), NC 146 reaches its eastern end at U.S. Route 25 in Skyland (but still within the Asheville city limits).

== History ==
The current routing of NC 146 was designated around 1991 as a renumbering of North Carolina Highway 280. NC 280 was rerouted at NC 191 to head directly east to U.S. Route 25. As a result, the former routing of NC 280 from NC 191 to Skyland became NC 146.

== Major Intersections ==
The entire route is in Buncombe County.

Location	mi	km	Destinations	Notes
Avery Creek	0.0	0.0	NC 191 (Brevard Road) / Vista Boulevard – Asheville, Hendersonville, Brevard	
	1.6– 1.7	2.6– 2.7	I-26 / US 74 – Hendersonville, Asheville	Exit 37 (I-26/US 74); single point urban interchange
Asheville	3.5	5.6	US 25 (Hendersonville Road) / Miller Road	
1.000 mi = 1.609 km; 1.000 km = 0.621 mi
