= Naples, North Carolina =

- Unincorporated community
- Location within North Carolina Location within the United States
- Coordinates: 35°23′33″N 82°30′02″W
- Country: United States
- State: North Carolina
- County: Henderson
- Founded: 1901
- Named for: Bay of Naples
- Elevation: 2,083 ft (635 m)
- Time zone: UTC-5 (Eastern (EST))
  - Summer (DST): UTC-4 (EDT)
- ZIP code: 28760
- Area code: 828
- GNIS feature ID: 1013873

Naples is an unincorporated community in Henderson County, North Carolina, United States, part of the Asheville metropolitan area. It is located near U.S. Route 25 Business (US 25 Bus.) and Interstate 26 (I-26) exit 44.

== History ==
The Naples community was named when the Naples Post Office was established in 1901, a relocation and renaming of Mud Creek Post Office since 1838. Because Mud Creek in the valley below often flooded, it reminded a local resident of the Bay of Naples.
