= North Carolina Highway 251 =

State highway in North Carolina, US

North Carolina Highway 251

Route information
- Maintained by NCDOT
- Length: 17.6 mi (28.3 km)
- Existed: 1980–present
- Tourist routes: French Broad Overview

Major junctions
- South end: Future I-26 / US 19 / US 23 / US 70 in Asheville
- North end: US 25 / US 70 near Marshall

Location
- Country: United States
- State: North Carolina
- Counties: Buncombe, Madison

Highway system
- North Carolina Highway System; Interstate; US; State; Scenic
← NC 242	→ US 258

North Carolina Highway 251 (NC 251) is a north/south state highway in western North Carolina. Its southern terminus at an interchange with U.S. Route 19 (US 19), US 23, and US 70 (future Interstate 26 or I-26) on the border of Asheville and Woodfin. The road largely follows the east bank of the French Broad River until its northern terminus at US 25/US 70 near Marshall in Madison County.

== Route description ==
NC 251 begins in Buncombe County on the border of Asheville and Woodfin near the University of North Carolina at Asheville campus. The starting point is along Broadway at exit 25 of the freeway currently carrying U.S. Routes 19, 23, and 70 (soon to also carry I-26). After passing Riverside Drive, NC 251 assumes this name as it begins to travel north paralleling a railroad and the French Broad River. Fully in Woodfin, the road travels past numerous commercial businesses located along the river with woods and some residences on the east side of it. Near the northern town limit, NC 251 breaks away from the riverbank to cut through a wooded area dotted with numerous county offices and buildings. After exiting Woodfin, the road remains near the river for the rest of its length. Cliffs and woods are along the east side of the road but only some small houses and small businesses line the west side of the road. After entering Madison County, NC 251 crosses the Ivy River and immediately afterwards, forms a brief 0.1-mile-long (0.16 km) concurrency with U.S. Route 25 Business (US 25 Bus.) and US 70 Bus. After the two business routes break off of NC 251 to head to Marshall, NC 251 continues north climbing a hill to end at an intersection with US 25 and US 70 Bypass. The road continues ahead as Tillery Branch Road.

== Junction list ==
County	Location	mi	km	Destinations	Notes
Buncombe	Woodfin–Asheville line	0.0– 0.2	0.0– 0.32	Future I-26 / US 19 / US 23 / US 70 / Broadway – Weaverville, Downtown Asheville	Exit 25 (Future I-26)
Madison		16.8	27.0	US 25 Bus. south / US 70 Bus. east (Ivy River Road)	Southern end of US 25 Bus./US 70 Bus. concurrency
Madison		16.9	27.2	US 25 Bus. north / US 70 Bus. west (South Main Street) – Marshall	Northern end of US 25 Bus./US 70 Bus. concurrency
Madison		17.6	28.3	US 25 / US 70 / Tillery Branch Road	
1.000 mi = 1.609 km; 1.000 km = 0.621 mi: Concurrency terminus
