= North Carolina Highway 112 =

State highway in Buncombe County, North Carolina, US

North Carolina Highway 112

Route information
- Maintained by NCDOT
- Length: 3.583 mi (5.766 km)
- Existed: 1940–present

Major junctions
- West end: US 19 / US 23 in Enka
- East end: NC 191 in Venable

Location
- Country: United States
- State: North Carolina
- Counties: Buncombe

Highway system
- North Carolina Highway System; Interstate; US; State; Scenic
← NC 111	→ NC 113

North Carolina Highway 112 (NC 112) is an east–west state highway in western North Carolina in Buncombe County, southwest of downtown Asheville.

== Route description ==
NC 112 begins at its western end at US 19/US 23 (Smokey Park Highway) in the unincorporated community of Enka, but within the city limits of Asheville. From here it travels south and then east on Sand Hill Road before turning southeasterly on Sardis Road then ending at North Carolina Highway 191 (Brevard Road) in the Asheville community of Venable. Though both ends are within the city limits, short portions of the road exit the city. Throughout most of the length, the Pisgah National Forest's border is located on the south side of the road.

== History ==
The NC 112 designation first appeared in 1930 as a new routing, running from US 19/NC 10 (present-day now US 74/US 441) near Wilmot to NC 107 (present-day US 19) at Cherokee. Around 1938, this routing was re-designated as North Carolina Highway 107-E, onto which present-day US 441 and US 441 Business run.

In 1940, NC 112 reappeared as a new primary routing, running from US 19/US 23 at Candler southwest to the Buncombe-Henderson county line. During the early 1950s, NC 112 was extended east along US 19/US 23 via an overlap and then southeasterly to NC 191. Around 1963, the original western segment between Candler and the county line was renumbered as NC 151, leaving only the present day routing between Enka and Venable.

== Major intersections ==
The entire route is in Buncombe County.

Location	mi	km	Destinations	Notes
Enka	0.000	0.000	US 19 / US 23 (Smokey Park Highway) / Asbury Road – Canton, Cherokee, Great Smoky Mountains National Park	
Venable	3.583	5.766	NC 191 (Brevard Road) / Ridgefield Boulevard – Hendersonville, Brevard	
1.000 mi = 1.609 km; 1.000 km = 0.621 mi
