= North Carolina Highway 191 =

State highway in North Carolina, US

North Carolina Highway 191

Route information
- Maintained by NCDOT
- Length: 21.62 mi (34.79 km)
- Existed: 1921–present

Major junctions
- South end: US 25 in Hendersonville
- I-26 / US 74 in Asheville; I-40 in Asheville; Future I-26 / I-240 in Asheville
- North end: US 19 Bus. / US 23 Bus. in Asheville

Location
- Country: United States
- State: North Carolina
- Counties: Henderson, Buncombe

Highway system
- North Carolina Highway System; Interstate; US; State; Scenic
← NC 186	→ NC 194

North Carolina Highway 191 (NC 191) is a primary state highway in the U.S. state of North Carolina. It travels within portions of Henderson and Buncombe Counties.

== Route description ==
NC 191 begins at an intersection with US 25 Business / Asheville Highway in the city of Hendersonville in Henderson County. Named Haywood Road, it travels northwest from Hendersonville and enters the town of Mills River, where it meets NC 280 (Boylston Highway). NC 191 runs concurrent with NC 280 northward for a short distance before separating after approximately 1 mile (1.6 km). The route continues north towards Asheville, leaving Henderson County and entering Buncombe County, before meeting the western terminus of NC 146 (Long Shoals Road) in the community of Avery Creek. Past Avery Creek, NC 191 intersects the scenic Blue Ridge Parkway, a National Parkway and All-American Road. The highway continues north into Venable, intersecting the eastern terminus of NC 112 (Sardis Road) and then I-26 and US 74 at exit 33 as it reaches the outermost city limits of Asheville. Entering the city, NC 191 interchanges with I-40 (exit 47) and one-half mile (0.80 km) later, with I-26/I-240 (exit 1B). NC 191 heads into the southwestern section of Asheville named Brevard Road. At just over 21.5 miles (34.6 km), the route reaches its northern end at US 19 Business/US 23 Business (Haywood Road).

== History ==
NC 191 is an original state highway. In 1971, the highway was routed along modern-day I-240 from Brevard Road to Haywood Road, a highway that was previously unnumbered. As a result, Brevard Road became unnumbered north of the freeway. Around 1981, NC 191 was moved back onto Brevard Road to end where it currently does at US 19 Business/US 23 Business The freeway became I-240.

== Major intersections ==
County	Location	mi	km	Destinations	Notes
Henderson	Hendersonville	0.00	0.00	US 25 Bus. (Asheville Highway)	Southern terminus
Henderson	Mills River	7.41	11.93	NC 280 west (Boylston Highway) – Brevard	West end of NC 280 overlap
Henderson	Mills River	8.53	13.73	NC 280 east (Boylston Highway) – Asheville Regional Airport	East end of NC 280 overlap
Buncombe	Avery Creek	13.20	21.24	NC 146 east (Long Shoals Road)	Western terminus NC 146
Buncombe	Bent Creek	15.65	25.19	Blue Ridge Parkway	
Buncombe	Asheville	17.69	28.47	NC 112 west (Sardis Road)	Eastern terminus NC 112
Buncombe	Asheville	18.30	29.45	I-26 / US 74 – Hendersonville, Asheville	Exit 33 (I-26/US 74)
Buncombe	Asheville	20.03	32.24	I-40 – Black Mountain, Canton	Exit 47(I-40)
Buncombe	Asheville	20.65	33.23	I-26 / I-240	Exit 1B (I-26/I-240)
Buncombe	Asheville	21.64	34.83	US 19 Bus. / US 23 Bus. (Haywood Road)	Northern terminus
1.000 mi = 1.609 km; 1.000 km = 0.621 mi: Concurrency terminus

== Special routes ==
=== Asheville alternate route ===
North Carolina Highway 191A
- Location: Asheville, North Carolina
- Length: 1.8 mi (2.9 km)
- Existed: 1957–1960

North Carolina Highway 191A (NC 191A) was established as a concurrency with US 19A/US 23A along Haywood Road, between Hanover Street and Patton Avenue. The route existed only in the late 1950s.
