= Forks of Ivy, North Carolina =

Unincorporated community in North Carolina, US

Coordinates: 35°47′30″N 82°32′20″W

Forks of Ivy is an unincorporated community primarily located in Buncombe County, North Carolina, United States. A portion of Forks of Ivy extends into Madison County as it is situated on the county line on Ivy Creek. Forks of Ivy is named for the fact that it is near the junction of Ivy and Little Ivy Creeks.

The elevation is 1,978 feet.
