= French Broad River =

River in North Carolina and Tennessee, United States

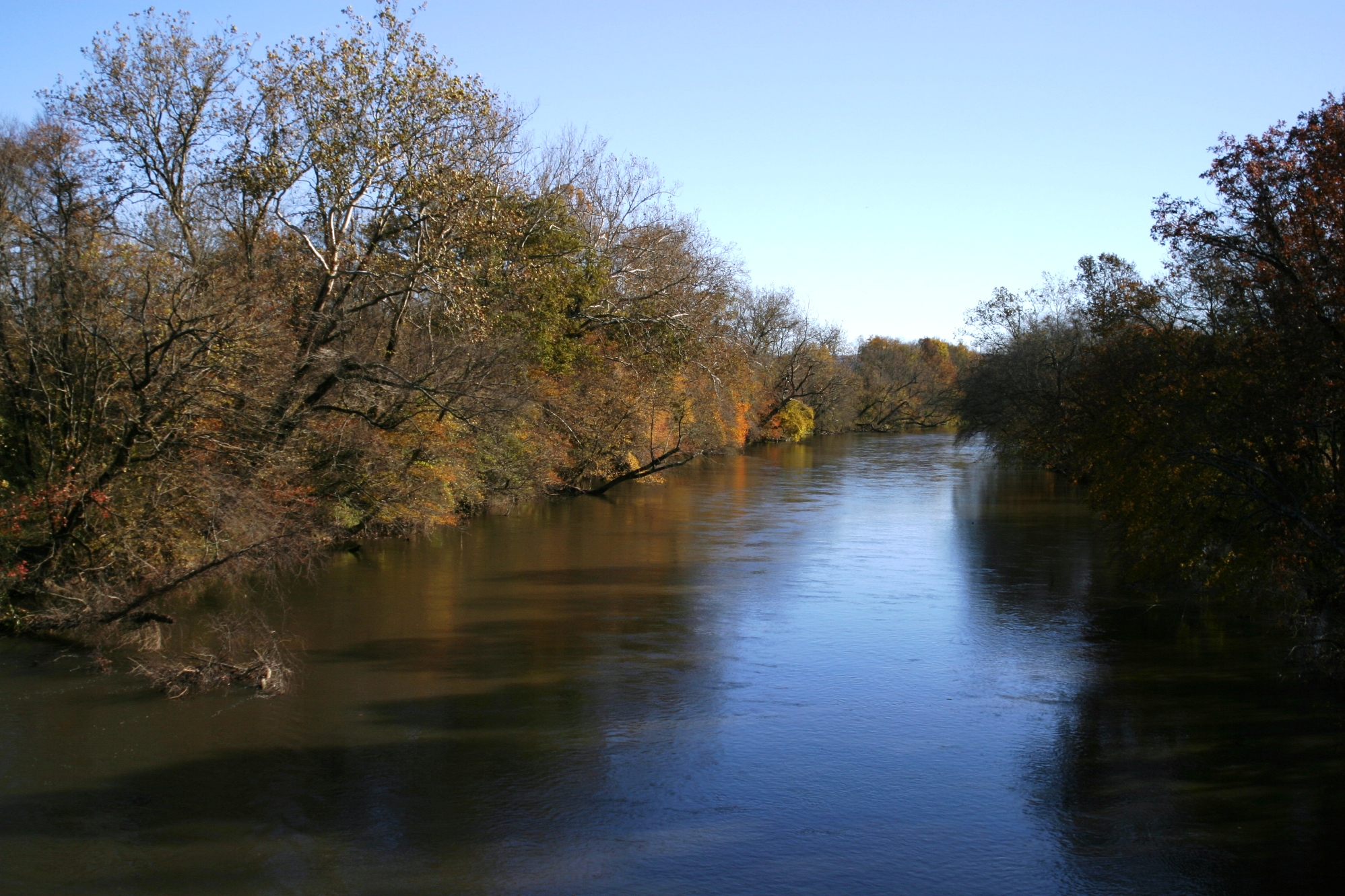
- French Broad River in Henderson County, North Carolina

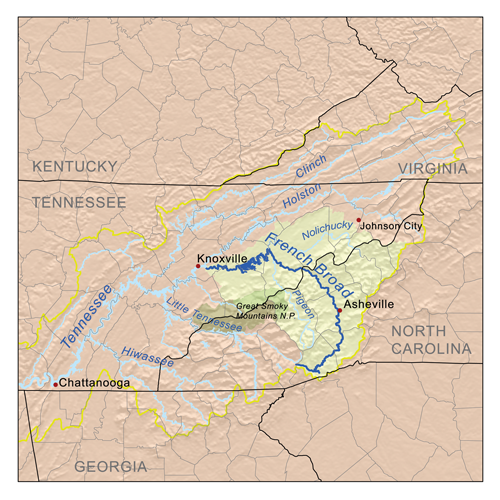
- French Broad River watershed

Location
- Country: United States
- State: North Carolina, Tennessee

Physical characteristics
- Source: North Fork French Broad River
  - location: Transylvania County, North Carolina
  - coordinates: 35°15′57″N 82°53′20″W
  - elevation: 3,189 ft (972 m)
- 2nd source: West Fork French Broad River
  - location: Transylvania County, North Carolina
  - coordinates: 35°11′09″N 82°59′01″W
  - elevation: 3,440 ft (1,050 m)
- Source confluence
  - location: Rosman, North Carolina
  - coordinates: 35°08′33″N 82°50′19″W
  - elevation: 2,195 ft (669 m)
- Mouth: Tennessee River
  - location: Knoxville, Tennessee
  - coordinates: 35°57′33″N 83°51′0″W
  - elevation: 814 ft (248 m)
- Length: 219 mi (352 km)
- Basin size: 5,124 sq mi (13,270 km^{2})
- Discharge
  - location: Riverdale, Tennessee, 7.5 miles (12.1 km) above the mouth(mean for water years 1945–1983)
  - average: 7,878 cu ft/s (223.1 m^{3}/s)(mean for water years 1945–1983)
  - minimum: 67 cu ft/s (1.9 m^{3}/s)October 1953
  - maximum: 160,000 cu ft/s (4,500 m^{3}/s)July 1867

Basin features
- Progression: French Broad → Tennessee → Ohio → Mississippi
- Tributaries
  - left: Pigeon River, Little Pigeon River
  - right: Swannanoa River, Nolichucky River

The French Broad River is a river in the U.S. states of North Carolina and Tennessee. It flows 218 miles (351 km) from near the town of Rosman in Transylvania County, North Carolina, into Tennessee, where its confluence with the Holston River at Knoxville forms the beginning of the Tennessee River. The river flows through the counties of Transylvania, Henderson, Buncombe, and Madison in North Carolina, and Cocke, Jefferson, Sevier, and Knox in Tennessee. It drains large portions of the Pisgah National Forest and the Cherokee National Forest. It is often believed to be one of the oldest rivers in the world.

== Course ==
The headwaters of the French Broad River are near the town of Rosman in Transylvania County, North Carolina, just northwest of the Eastern Continental Divide near the northwest border of South Carolina. They spill from a 50-foot (15 m) waterfall called Courthouse Falls at the terminus of Courthouse Creek near Balsam Grove. The waterfall feeds into a creek that becomes the North Fork, which joins the West Fork west of Rosman. South of Rosman, the stream is joined by the Middle and East forks to form the French Broad River.

From there it flows northeast through the Appalachian Mountains into Henderson, and Buncombe counties. In Buncombe County, the river flows through Asheville where it receives the water of the Swannanoa River. Downstream of Asheville, the river passes north through Marshall and Madison County. After passing through Hot Springs in the Bald Mountains, the river enters Cocke County, Tennessee.

In Cocke County, the river passes through Del Rio and receives the waters of both the Pigeon and the Nolichucky rivers northwest of Newport. The river enters the slack waters of Douglas Lake, which was created by the Tennessee Valley Authority's Douglas Dam in Sevier County, approximately 32 miles (51 km) upstream from the river's mouth. Near Sevierville, at Kodak, the French Broad River receives the flow of the Little Pigeon River, which drains much of the Tennessee section of the Great Smoky Mountains. After flowing through a wide gap in Bays Mountain, it enters Knox County. Its confluence with the Holston River forms the Tennessee River at a place known as "Forks of the River", at the eastern edge of Knoxville.

== Major tributaries ==
- North Fork
- West Fork
- East Fork
- Middle Fork
- Pigeon River
- Nolichucky River
- Mills River
- Davidson River
- Swannanoa River
- Little River (French Broad River)

== History ==
=== Name Origin ===
Before European colonization, the Cherokee people who occupied the area referred to the river by different names such as Poe-li-co, Agiqua, Zillicoah, and Tah-kee-os-tee ("racing waters"). The French colonists then named the river the French Broad River because it drained into French territory, and they needed to differentiate it from the Broad River, which also lies in North Carolina.

=== Cherokee History ===
The river is considered to roughly mark the eastern boundary of the Cherokee homelands in this region, which included areas of present-day northwestern South Carolina, northeastern Georgia, and southeastern Tennessee. The French called the river the Agiqua, borrowing one of the Cherokee names.

=== Government Regulation ===
Initiated as a project during the administration of President Franklin D. Roosevelt, Douglas Dam was completed in the 1940s on the lower French Broad by the TVA to provide electricity and flood control. It is one of the larger TVA developments on a tributary of the Tennessee River. (The two other very large ones are Norris Lake on the Clinch River and Cherokee Lake on the Holston River.)

In 1987, the North Carolina General Assembly established the French Broad River State Trail as a blueway which follows the river for 117 miles (188 km). The paddle trail is a part of the North Carolina State Trails System, which is a section of the NC Division of Parks and Recreation. A system of launch point sites was created along the river to support the trail.

A portion of the French Broad River in Tennessee was designated as a state scenic river by the Tennessee Scenic Rivers Act of 1968. Approximately 33 miles (53 km) of the river in Cocke County, starting at the North Carolina border and extending downstream to the place where it flows into Douglas Lake, are designated as a Class III, Partially Developed River.

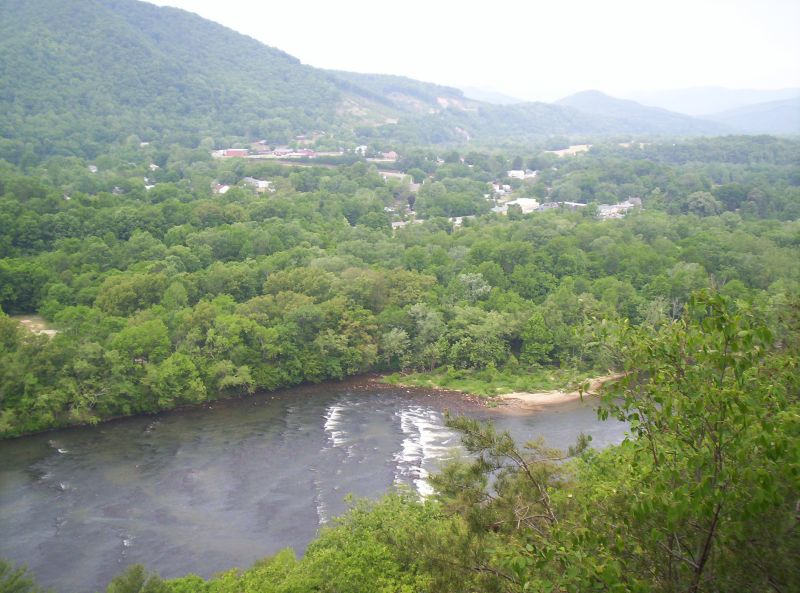
French Broad River as seen from the Appalachian Trail near Hot Springs, North Carolina

== Crossings ==
The following is a list of crossings of the French Broad from Brevard to the confluence with the Tennessee River.

=== North Carolina ===
- Transylvania and Henderson counties
  - Patton Bridge
  - Crab Creek Road
  - Blantyre Road
  - Etowah School Road in Etowah
  - McLean Bridge (U.S. 64) in Etowah
  - Johnson Bridge
  - Fannings Bridge
  - Butler Bridge
  - Kings Bridge (N.C. 191)
  - Boylston Highway (N.C. 280) at the Asheville Regional Airport
- Buncombe County/Asheville
  - Glenn Bridge
  - Long Shoals Road (N.C. 146) in Skyland
  - Blue Ridge Parkway
  - Interstate 26
  - Interstate 40 at the Biltmore Estate
  - Carrier Bridge in Asheville
  - Haywood Road in Asheville
  - Smith Bridge in Asheville
  - Bowen Bridge (Interstate 26/I-240/U.S. 19/U.S. 74) in Asheville
  - Pearson Bridge in Asheville
  - Old Leicester Highway in Craggy
  - Fletcher Martin Road
- Madison County
  - Bailey's Branch Road in Marshall
  - A small bridge connecting Bailey's Branch Road to Blannahasset Island
  - Little Pine Road
  - Barnard Road in Barnard (put-in for Section 9 of the French Broad, a Class III-IV whitewater run that is the most frequently paddled section of the river)
  - (U.S. 25)/(U.S. 70) in Hot Springs (takeout for Section 9); the Appalachian Trail crosses this bridge.

=== Tennessee ===
- Cocke County
  - Wolf Creek Bridge
  - Bridge in Del Rio
  - James T Huff Bridge (U.S. 25/U.S. 70)
  - U.S. 321 in Newport
  - Holt Town Road
  - U.S. Route 25E from Cocke County into Jefferson County)
- Douglas Lake to Knoxville
  - Interstate 40 and Donald J Trump Bridge (U.S. 70) over Douglas Lake
  - James D. Hoskins Bridge in Dandridge
  - Douglas Dam Road
  - TN 66 at Sevierville
  - Several golf cart path bridges over the Cain Islands
  - Doctor JH Gammondale Bridge in Marbledale

== Pollution ==
=== Hurricane Helene ===
In 2024, Hurricane Helene was reported to have affected the French Broad River and surrounding areas more than any other hurricane before it. After Hurricane Helene, the French Broad River suffered from water pollution with high levels of contaminants recorded, including PFAS, pesticides, and other hazardous chemicals. The chemicals found highly threaten aquatic life and pose a small risk to human health. The amount of harmful substances within the water surpasses the maximum concentration levels set by the Environmental Protection Agency for consumption.

== Aquatic life ==
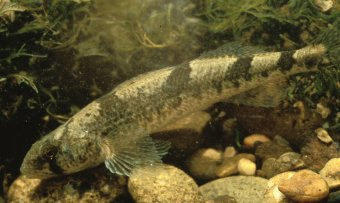
Image of the snail darter Percina tanasi species of fish.

Catfish, largemouth bass, and brown and rainbow trout are part of the diverse array of fish to be found in the French Broad River. Additionally, populations of the Snail darter, a vulnerable fish species, are recorded to have increased significantly in the river since the species was initially sampled in 1988.

== See also ==
- List of North Carolina rivers
- List of Tennessee rivers
- Wilma Dykeman RiverWay Plan (for RiverLink's sustainable greenways and park developments on/near the French Broad River)
