= U.S. Route 25 in North Carolina =

Segment of American highway

U.S. Highway 25
- US 25 highlighted in red

Route information
- Maintained by NCDOT
- Length: 75.4 mi (121.3 km)
- Existed: 1926–present

Major junctions
- South end: US 25 at the South Carolina state line near Tuxedo
- US 176 / US 25 Bus. near East Flat Rock; I-26 / US 74 near East Flat Rock; US 64 in Hendersonville; US 25A / NC 280 in Arden; I-40 in Asheville; I-240 / US 70 / US 74A in Asheville; Future I-26 / US 19 / US 23 / US 70 in Woodfin
- North end: US 25 / US 70 at the Tennessee state line near Hot Springs

Location
- Country: United States
- State: North Carolina
- Counties: Henderson, Buncombe, Madison

Highway system
- United States Numbered Highway System; List; Special; Divided; North Carolina Highway System; Interstate; US; State; Scenic
← NC 24	→ I-26

U.S. Highway 25 (US 25) is a north–south United States Numbered Highway that runs for 75.4 miles (121.3 km) from the South Carolina state line, near Tuxedo, to the Tennessee state line, near Hot Springs. It is part of the longer US 25, which runs from Brunswick, Georgia, to Covington, Ohio. It is a major north–south route through Western North Carolina.

The route is mostly expressway or freeway grade, except for the section through the city of Asheville, where it follows several city streets. Two short sections are cosigned with Interstate 26 (I-26), and the northernmost 28 miles (45 km) are cosigned with US 70. It originally followed the route of the historic Dixie Highway, though, in several places, it bypasses the original route on new alignments, several of which are now signed as either North Carolina Highway 225 (NC 225), NC 251, or US 25 Business (US 25 Bus.).

== Route description ==
US 25 enters from South Carolina between Frank and Panther Mountains (part of the Saluda Mountains) and also changes from an expressway to freeway. The first nine miles (14 km) of US 25 is solo, bypassing the smaller communities of Tuxedo, Zirconia, Flat Rock, and East Flat Rock. Its original alignment in the area is NC 225 and US 25 Bus. through Hendersonville, before it was signed along Corridor W, part of the Appalachian Development Highway System (ADHS).

At exit 9, US 25 merges with I-26/US 74 and goes northwesterly, crossing the Eastern Continental Divide (elevation 2,130 ft or 650 m), at the Crest Road overpass (Secondary Road 1803). In Hendersonville, it connects with US 64, which connect travelers to nearby Chimney Rock, Lake Lure, and Brevard.

At I-26's exit 44, US 25 splits from I-26/US 74 and onto a four-lane road through Fletcher. In Arden, US 25A begins, providing a 8.5-mile (13.7 km) alternate route that avoids Skyland and Biltmore Forest; the intersection also begins the Asheville city limit, which encompasses everything between US 25 and US 25A. Between Skyland and Biltmore Forest, the Blue Ridge Parkway crosses over US 25 with access roads along both north and southbound lanes. US 25 enters Asheville proper near I-40; passing underneath, it enters Biltmore Village, where US 25A merges back and Biltmore Estate is located. Passing over the Swannanoa River, US 25 enters the downtown area along McDowell Street then onto Southside and Biltmore avenues. US 25 goes through the center of Asheville, which was once marked by an obelisk to Zebulon Vance, as it was demolished in 2021. From the city center, it continues on Broadway Street to I-240, where it switches onto Merrimon Avenue. At Beaver Lake, the road drops form four to two lanes for 1.7 miles (2.7 km) before merging with Future I-26/US 19/US 23/US 70, in Woodfin; Merrimon Avenue continues on as Weaverville Road, signed as US 19 Bus.

US 25 has a short 4.3-mile (6.9 km) concurrency with Future I-26/US 19/US 23, before continuing northwest, on a four-lane expressway with US 70, in Weaverville. US 25/US 70 bypasses north of Marshall, with US 25 Bus./US 70 Bus. utilizing the original route through town. Northwest of Marshall, US 25/US 70 drops from four to two lanes, which it will remain for the rest of its routing through North Carolina. Entering Pisgah National Forest near Walnut, US 25/US 70 go westerly, crossing the French Broad River in Hot Springs, then crossing through the Bald Mountains into Tennessee.

=== Scenic byways ===
US 25 is part of two scenic byways in the state (indicated by a Scenic Byways sign).

French Broad Overview is an 17-mile (27 km) byway from Weaverville to Marshall; it is known for its scenic views along the French Broad River. The byway begins at the Monticello Road intersection in Weaverville, where it connects with NC 251 along the banks of the French Broad River; it continues north, switching to US 25 Bus./US 70 Bus. into Marshall and it back along US 25/US 70.

Appalachian Medley is a 45-mile (72 km) byway from near Lake Junaluska to Walnut; it is known for several recreational areas, the Appalachian Trail, and its scenic mountain drive. US 25/US 70 is on 10 miles (16 km) of the byway from Walnut to Hot Springs, where it continues via NC 209.

== History ==
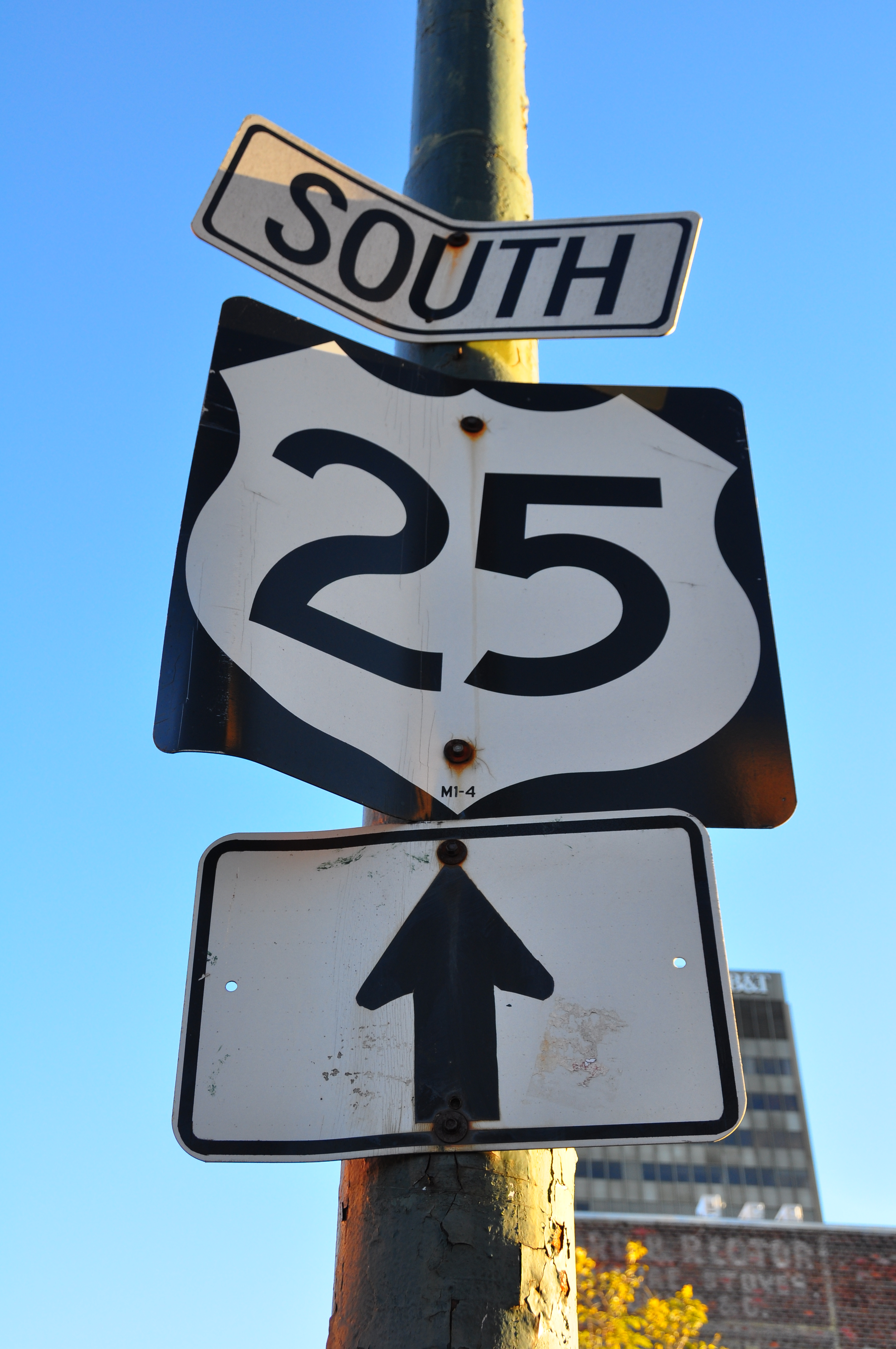
US 25 in Asheville

Established as an original U.S. Highway in 1926, US 25 was assigned along the Dixie Highway, which followed NC 29 from South Carolina, through Tuxedo, Flat Rock, Hendersonville, and Biltmore Forest, to Asheville. In the downtown area, US 25 links up with US 70/NC 20 on College Street; it then proceeds north along Merrimon Avenue out of the city. Following Old Marshall Highway to Marshall, it continues along the same route as today into Tennessee. In 1929, NC 29 was replaced by an extension of NC 69; in 1934, both NC 20 and NC 69 were dropped from the route.

Around 1933, US 25 was rerouted along McDowell Street from Biltmore Avenue. During the mid-1950s, US 25 was split onto one-way streets in Hendersonville (northbound King Street/southbound Main Street); by the early 1960s, southbound traffic moved onto College Street, replacing US 25A (originally established sometime in 1939–1944 as a bypass through the main roads of town).

In 1960, a bypass north around Marshall was completed, old route through town became US 25 Bus. (along with US 70). Around 1969, the community of Walnut was bypassed. In 1981, US 25 was moved onto the existing US 19/US 23 freeway north of Asheville, it then went on to a new four-lane road west of Weaverville; most of the old route was replaced by NC 251.

In 1974, US 25 was placed onto new expressway between Zirconia to the South Carolina state line, the old route would later become part of NC 225 in 1997. In September 2003, US 25 was rerouted onto I-26/US 74, bypassing Flat Rock and Hendersonville, then replacing part of NC 225 that bridged the connection from the Interstate to Zirconia. The old route was replaced by NC 225 through Flat Rock and US 25 Bus. through Hendersonville via US 176.

== Junction list ==
County	Location	mi	km	Exit	Destinations	Notes
Henderson		0.00	0.00		US 25 south – Greenville	South end of freeway; continuation into South Carolina
Henderson		1.1	1.8	1	NC 225 north (Bobs Creek Road)	
Henderson		3.2	5.1	3	Green River Road – Tuxedo	
Henderson	Zirconia	5.4	8.7	5	NC 225 – Tuxedo, Flat Rock	
Henderson	East Flat Rock	7.1	11.4	7	US 176 / US 25 Bus. north – Saluda, East Flat Rock, Hendersonville	
Henderson		8.9	14.3	8	I-26 east / US 74 east – Spartanburg	South end of I-26/US 74 overlap; I-26 exit 54
Henderson	Hendersonville	10.1	16.3	53	Upward Road – Hendersonville	Exit numbers follow I-26
Henderson	Hendersonville	13.6	21.9	49	US 64 – Hendersonville, Bat Cave	Signed as exits 49A (east) and 49B (west); cloverleaf interchange
Henderson	Fletcher	19.3	31.1		US 25 Bus. south (Asheville Highway) / I-26 / US 74 west – Asheville, Hendersonville	North end of freeway section; north end of I-26/US 74 overlap; I-26 exit 44
Buncombe	Arden	23.9	38.5		US 25A north (Sweeten Creek Road) / NC 280 west (Airport Road) – Asheville Regional Airport	
Buncombe	Skyland	25.8	41.5		NC 146 west (Long Shoals Road)	
Buncombe	Biltmore Forest	28.3	45.5		Blue Ridge Parkway	Interchange
Buncombe	Asheville	31.2	50.2		I-40 – Hickory, Statesville, Knoxville	I-40 exit 50
Buncombe	Asheville				NC 81 east	
Buncombe	Asheville	31.9	51.3		US 25A south	At intersection to Biltmore Estate
Buncombe	Asheville	34.5	55.5		I-240 / US 70 / US 74A (Billy Graham Freeway)	I-240 exit 5A
Buncombe	Woodfin	38.7	62.3		US 19 Bus. north (Weaverville Road) – Weaverville	East end of US 19 Bus. overlap
Buncombe	Woodfin	38.8	62.4		US 19 Bus. ends Future I-26 / US 70 east / US 19 / US 23 south – Asheville	West end of US 19 Bus. overlap; south end of Future I-26/US 19/US 23/US 70 overlap; I-26 exit 23
Buncombe	Woodfin	40.8	65.7	21	New Stock Road – Weaverville	Exit numbers follow I-26
Buncombe	Weaverville	43.0	69.2	19A	Weaverville	No exit number southbound
Buncombe	Weaverville	43.0	69.2		Future I-26 west / US 19 / US 23 north – Johnson City	North end of Future I-26/US 19/US 23 overlap; I-26 north exit 19B, south exit 19
Madison		50.0	80.5		US 25 Bus. north / US 70 Bus. west (Ivy River Road) – Marshall	
Madison		51.8	83.4		NC 251 south	
Madison		53.1	85.5		NC 213 east – Mars Hill, Mars Hill University	Interchange; south end of NC 213 overlap
Madison		55.2	88.8		US 25 Bus. south / US 70 Bus. east (Main Street) – Downtown Marshall, Public Library	
Madison		58.9	94.8		Walnut Drive (NC 213 west)	North end of NC 213 overlap
Madison	Hurricane	64.4	103.6		NC 208 north – Greeneville	
Madison	Hot Springs	69.6	112.0		NC 209 south (Lance Avenue) – Lake Junaluska	
Madison		75.4	121.3		US 25 north / US 70 west (SR 9 west) – Newport	Continuation into Tennessee
1.000 mi = 1.609 km; 1.000 km = 0.621 mi: Concurrency terminus

== See also ==
- Special routes of U.S. Route 25

U.S. Route 25
Previous state: South Carolina	North Carolina	Next state: Tennessee
