= Skyland, North Carolina =

Unincorporated community in North Carolina, US

Coordinates: 35°29′20″N 82°31′27″W

Skyland is an unincorporated community in Buncombe County, North Carolina, United States. It is on U.S. Route 25, where North Carolina Highway 146 starts, east of Interstate 26. It is north of Royal Pines, south of Biltmore Forest, and a suburb of Asheville. The ZIP Code for Skyland is 28776.

== See also ==
- Asheville metropolitan area
