= Special routes of U.S. Route 74 =

Special routes of U.S. Route 74

Highway system
- United States Numbered Highway System; List; Special; Divided

Several special routes of U.S. Route 74 exist. In order from west to east they are as follows.

== Current ==
=== Asheville–Forest City alternate route ===
U.S. Highway 74A
- Location: Asheville–Forest City, NC
- Length: 60 mi (97 km)
- Existed: 1994–present

U.S. Route 74 Alternate (US 74A) was established in 1994, replaced the old mainline US 74 route when US 74 was moved onto the Solon David Smart Memorial Highway and I-26. The alignment of US 74A varies greatly from the current parent route. US 74A traverses through downtown Asheville, goes through the mountain resort communities of Chimney Rock and Lake Lure, continues to Ruth, passes between the towns of Rutherfordton and Spindale, and bypasses Forest City to the south. US 74, joins I-40 eastbound west of Asheville, and switches onto I-26 eastbound through Fletcher, bypassing most of urban Asheville. Continuing along a southeasterly course, the parent US 74 passes by Hendersonville and splits from I-26 at Columbus; after passing south of Rutherfordton, US 74 meets the eastern terminus of US 74A.

US 74A is concurrent with US 64 from Ruth in the east through Lake Lure, where NC 9 joins, and Chimney Rock; the three routes separate in Bat Cave. NC 9 splits to the north, US 64 to the south; US 74A alone continues west from that point. In Asheville, US 74A has many concurrencies; US 70 is concurrent with US 74A in east and downtown Asheville and Interstate 26, I-240, US 19/US 23 are concurrent with US 74A west of downtown. Near US 74A's western terminus, US 19/US 23 are concurrent with US 74A. NC 81 overlaps with US 74A for a short 1-mile (1.6 km) segment in southeast Asheville. Between Asheville and Gerton, US 74A bears the street name Charlotte Highway. East of Gerton, the road is named the Gerton Highway until arriving at Bat Cave. Through towns and cities, the road takes various names including Main Street and Railroad Avenue.

US 74A is overlapped by two North Carolina scenic byways: Drovers Road (Asheville to Bat Cave) and Black Mountain Rag (Bat Cave to Lake Lure).

Major junctions

County	Location	mi	km	Exit	Destinations	Notes
Buncombe	Asheville	0.00	0.00		US 19 / US 23 south (Smokey Park Highway south) / I-40 / US 74 – Canton	Western end of US 19/US 23 concurrency; western terminus; I-40 exit 44; highway continues south as US 19/US 23.
Buncombe	Asheville	3.2	5.1		NC 63 north (Leicester Highway) – Leicester	
Buncombe	Asheville	4.0	6.4		I-240 west to Future I-26 / I-40	Southern end of I-240/I-26 concurrency
Buncombe	Asheville	4.4	7.1	3B	Westgate Parkway / Resort Drive	Exit numbers follow I-240.
Buncombe	Asheville	4.8	7.7	4A	Future I-26 / US 70 west / US 19 / US 23 north – UNC Asheville, Weaverville, Woodfin	Northern end of I-26 and US 19/US 23 concurrencies; western end of US 70 concurrency
Buncombe	Asheville	5.0	8.0	4B	Patton Avenue – Downtown	No westbound exit
Buncombe	Asheville	5.5	8.9	4C	Montford Avenue / Haywood Street	
Buncombe	Asheville	6.0	9.7	5A	US 25 (Merrimon Avenue)	Eastbound entrance includes direct entrance ramp from Woodfin Street.
Buncombe	Asheville	6.2	10.0		I-240 east – Oteen	Eastern end of I-240 concurrency; I-240 exit 5B
Buncombe	Asheville	6.5	10.5		NC 694 north (Town Mountain Road)	Southern terminus of NC 694
Buncombe	Asheville				Beaucatcher Tunnel	
Buncombe	Asheville	7.5	12.1		I-240	I-240 exit 6; access to I-240 east via Chunns Cove Road
Buncombe	Asheville	8.0	12.9		US 70 east (Tunnel Road east)	Eastern end of US 70 concurrency
Buncombe	Asheville	8.7	14.0		NC 81 west (Swannanoa River Road west) – Biltmore Forest	Western end of NC 81 concurrency
Buncombe	Asheville	10.0	16.1		NC 81 east (Swannanoa River Road east) – Swannanoa	Eastern end of NC 81 concurrency
Buncombe	Asheville	10.5	16.9		I-240 west	Western end of I-240 concurrency; I-240 exit 8
Buncombe	Asheville	11.0	17.7		I-240 ends / I-40 – Statesville, Knoxville	Eastern end of I-240 concurrency; I-240 exit 9; I-40 exit 53
Buncombe	Asheville	11.8	19.0		Blue Ridge Parkway	Right-in/right-out interchange in both directions
Henderson	Bat Cave	28.7	46.2		NC 9 north – Black Mountain	Western end of NC 9 concurrency
Henderson	Bat Cave	28.8	46.3		US 64 west – Hendersonville	Western end of US 64 concurrency
Rutherford	Lake Lure	36.0	57.9		NC 9 south – Mill Spring	Eastern end of NC 9 concurrency
Rutherford	Rutherfordton	52.0	83.7		US 221 – Marion	Interchange
Rutherford	Ruth	52.5	84.5		US 64 east – Morganton	Eastern end of US 64 concurrency
Rutherford	Rutherfordton	54.0	86.9		US 74 Bus. / US 221A – Spindale, Forest City	
Rutherford	Spindale				Oakland Road Spindale	Interchange; eastbound signage Interchange; westbound signage
Rutherford	Forest City	60.0	96.6		US 74 – Columbus, Asheville, Shelby	Interchange; eastern terminus
1.000 mi = 1.609 km; 1.000 km = 0.621 mi: Concurrency terminus; Incomplete access

=== Rutherfordton–Forest City business loop ===
U.S. Highway 74 Business
- Location: Rutherfordton – Forest City, NC
- Length: 21.5 mi (34.6 km)
- Existed: 1960–present

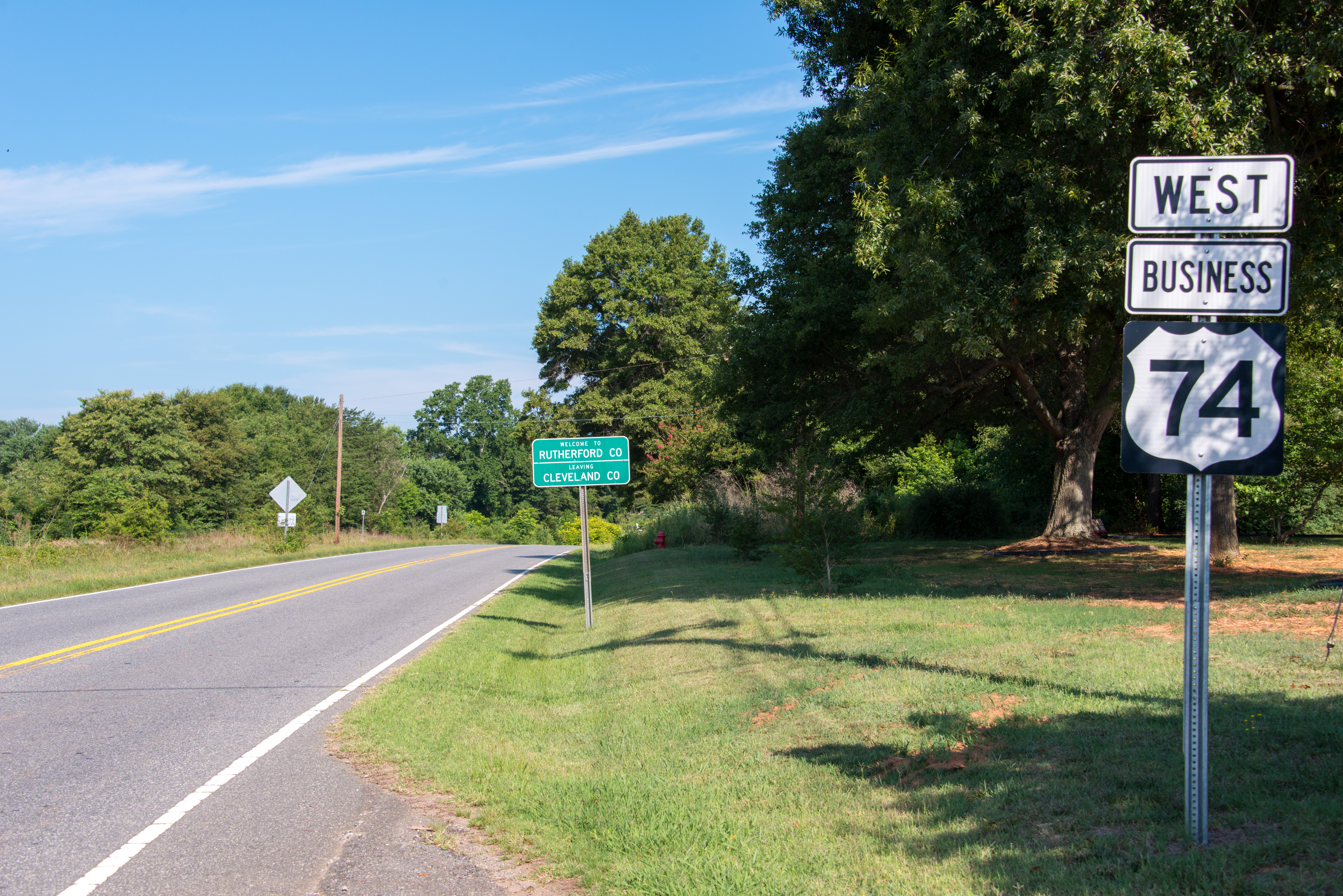
US 74 Business at the Cleveland/Rutherford County line

U.S. Route 74 Business (US 74 Bus) was established in 1960 as a renumbering of US 74A, it traversed along Washington Street and Charlotte Road in Rutherfordton. In December 1970, US 74 was extended east through Spindale, Forest City, and Ellenboro when US 74 was placed on new freeway bypass. In 1994, US 74 was moved south onto a new alignment towards Columbus, converting the old mainline into US 74A; as a result, US 74 Business was rerouted in Rutherfordton to go south in concurrency with US 221 to the US 74 freeway.

Major junctions

County	Location	mi	km	Destinations	Notes
Rutherford		0.0	0.0	US 74 / US 221 south – Columbus, Shelby, Chesnee	South end of US 221 overlap
Rutherford	Rutherfordton	5.3	8.5	US 221 north / US 221A / NC 108 west – Marion, Columbus	North end of US 221/US 221A overlap
Rutherford	Rutherfordton	6.2	10.0	US 74A – Ruth, Forest City	
Rutherford	Forest City	11.4	18.3	US 221A south (Broadway Street)	South end of US 221A overlap
Rutherford		12.8	20.6	Bostic Sunshine Highway – Bostic	
Cleveland		20.1	32.3	NC 120 south – Cliffside	
Cleveland	Mooresboro	21.5	34.6	US 74 – Columbus, Shelby	
1.000 mi = 1.609 km; 1.000 km = 0.621 mi: Concurrency terminus

=== Shelby Bypass ===
U.S. Highway 74 Bypass
- Location: Shelby, North Carolina
- Length: 18.5 mi (29.8 km)
- Existed: 2025–present

U.S. Route 74 Bypass (US 74 Byp.) is the future designation of the Shelby Bypass; currently being constructed in phases. The designation, listed on NCDOT documents, has not been submitted/approved by AASHTO.

First segment opened in April 2020 from US 74, east of Mooresboro, to NC 226 (Polkville Road). In June 2025, the second segment was opened, extending the bypass to NC 150 (Cherryville Road). The last segment of the bypass will reunite with US 74 east of Shelby, near Long Branch Road, with an anticipated completion date in 2029.

=== Shelby business loop ===
U.S. Highway 74 Business
- Location: Shelby, North Carolina
- Length: 6.2 mi (10.0 km)
- Existed: 1960–present

U.S. Route 74 Business (US 74 Bus) was established in 1960 as a renumbering of US 74A, following Marion Street and Warren Street. In December 1971, the eastern portion of Warren Street was changed, forcing eastbound US 74 Business to be rerouted north on DeKalb Street then onto Marion Street.

Major junctions

The entire route is in Shelby, Cleveland County.

mi	km	Destinations	Notes
0.0	0.0	US 74 / NC 226 – Forest City, Columbus, Polkville	
1.5	2.4	NC 18 / NC 150 west (Lafayette Street) – Fallston	West end of NC 150 overlap
3.2	5.1	NC 150 east (Cherryville Road) – Cherryville	East end of NC 150 overlap
4.8	7.7	NC 180 (Post Road)	
6.2	10.0	US 74 – Kings Mountain, Gastonia, Charlotte	
1.000 mi = 1.609 km; 1.000 km = 0.621 mi: Concurrency terminus

=== Kings Mountain business loop ===
U.S. Highway 74 Business
- Location: Kings Mountain, North Carolina
- Length: 5.4 mi (8.7 km)
- Existed: 1984–present

U.S. Route 74 Business (US 74 Bus) was established in 1984, it was a renumbering of the old mainline US 74 through Kings Mountain. US 74 Business begins at US 74 west of Kings Mountain. The route is routed along Shelby Road into the town. US 74 Business runs through the downtown of area Kings Mountain before reaching US 74 again on the eastern side of Kings Mountain.

Major junctions

County	Location	mi	km	Destinations	Notes
Cleveland	Kings Mountain	0.0	0.0	US 74 – Shelby, Gastonia	
Cleveland	Kings Mountain	2.0	3.2	Kings Mountain Boulevard	
Cleveland	Kings Mountain	4.0	6.4	NC 216 (Battleground Avenue) – Grover, Cherryville	
Cleveland	Kings Mountain	4.6	7.4	NC 161 (Cleveland Avenue) – Bessemer City, York	
Gaston		5.4	8.7	US 74 east – Gastonia, Charlotte	Eastbound exit and westbound entrance
1.000 mi = 1.609 km; 1.000 km = 0.621 mi: Incomplete access

=== Monroe Expressway ===
U.S. Highway 74 Bypass
- Location: Stallings–Wingate, NC
- Length: 18.72 mi (30.13 km)
- Existed: 2018–present

U.S. Route 74 Bypass (US 74 Byp.), also known as the Monroe Expressway, is a 18.72-mile (30.13 km) toll road that bypass north of Monroe, between Stallings and east of Wingate. The highway's purpose is to improve mobility and capacity along the US 74 corridor. At a cost of approximately $840 million and right-of-way acquisition already completed, construction was originally to begin in October 2012; however, because of several environmental issues and litigation, the project was delayed until May 2015. On November 27, 2018, the Monroe Expressway opened to traffic.

The Monroe Expressway uses all-electronic tolling, with tolls payable with valid transponder (NC Quick Pass, E-ZPass, Peach Pass or SunPass) or Bill by mail, which uses automatic license plate recognition. Tolls are collected per gantry, seven in total, which are located between each exit along the bypass. As of July 24, 2018, the total trip rate is $2.54 with valid transponder and $3.92 via bill by mail.

Major junctions

The entire route is in Union County.

Location	mi	km	Exit	Destinations	Notes
Stallings			—	US 74 west – Charlotte	Continuation as US 74
Hemby Bridge			257	Indian Trail–Fairview Road – Hemby Bridge, Indian Trail	
Indian Trail			259	Unionville–Indian Trail Road – Lake Park	
Monroe			260	Rocky River Road	
Monroe			264	US 601 (Concord Highway) – Monroe, Concord	
Monroe			266	NC 200 (Morgan Mill Road)	
Wingate			270	Austin Chaney Road – Wingate	
	18.72	30.13	—	US 74 east – Rockingham	Continuation as US 74
1.000 mi = 1.609 km; 1.000 km = 0.621 mi

=== Rockingham–Hamlet business loop ===
U.S. Highway 74 Business
- Location: Rockingham – Hamlet, NC
- Length: 15.0 mi (24.1 km)
- Existed: 2003–present

U.S. Route 74 Business (US 74 Bus) was established in 2003 as a renumbering of the mainline US 74 through Rockingham and Hamlet.

Major junctions

The entire route is in Richmond County.

Location	mi	km	Destinations	Notes
	0.0	0.0	I-73 north / I-74 / US 74 – Asheboro, Monroe, Lumberton	
Rockingham	2.0	3.2	Cartledge Creek Road	
Rockingham	5.5	8.9	US 220 – Asheboro, Cheraw	
Rockingham	5.8	9.3	US 1 south (Hancock Street) – Cheraw	
Hamlet	11.0	17.7	NC 177 (King Street) – Cheraw	
Hamlet	12.0	19.3	NC 38 south (Louis Breeden Boulevard) – Bennettsville	
	13.0	20.9	NC 381 south – Gibson	
	15.0	24.1	US 74 / Future I-74 east – Laurinburg	Eastbound exit and Westbound entrance
1.000 mi = 1.609 km; 1.000 km = 0.621 mi: Incomplete access

=== Laurinburg–Maxton business loop ===
U.S. Highway 74 Business
- Location: Laurinburg – Maxton, NC
- Length: 12.4 mi (20.0 km)
- Existed: 1967–present

U.S. Route 74 Business (US 74 Bus) was established in 1967 as a renumbering of mainline US 74 through Laurinburg. In 1984, it was extended east replacing mainline US 74 through Maxton.

Major junctions

County	Location	mi	km	Destinations	Notes
Scotland		0.0	0.0	I-74 west / US 74 west – Hamlet, Rockingham	Westbound exit and eastbound entrance
Scotland	Laurinburg	1.3	2.1	NC 79 south (Gibson Road) – Gibson	
Scotland	Laurinburg	2.0	3.2	US 15 / US 401 / US 501 – Aberdeen, Raeford, McColl	
Scotland	Laurinburg	2.8	4.5	US 15 Bus. / US 401 Bus. / US 501 Bus. (Main Street)	
Scotland		5.8	9.3	I-74 / US 74 – Hamlet, Rockingham, Whiteville	
Robeson	Maxton	9.8	15.8	NC 71 north / NC 130 south (Patterson Street) – Red Springs, Raemon	
Robeson		12.4	20.0	I-74 / US 74 / US 74 Alt. east – Laurinburg, Whiteville	
1.000 mi = 1.609 km; 1.000 km = 0.621 mi: Incomplete access

=== Maxton–Lumberton alternate route ===
U.S. Highway 74 Alternate
- Location: Maxton – Lumberton, NC
- Length: 15.5 mi (24.9 km)
- Existed: 2007–present

U.S. Route 74 Alternate (US 74 Alt) was established in 2007 when mainline US 74 and I-74 were realigned to a new freeway south of the old route, between Maxton to near Lumberton. The route, just south of the banks of the Lumber River, goes through mostly farmland. In between, NC 710 connect travelers to Pembroke, where the University of North Carolina at Pembroke is located. Highway signs along the route are signed as "Alternate" or "ALT" above US 74; as opposed to US 74A, which is used in Western North Carolina.

Major junctions

The entire route is in Robeson County.

Location	mi	km	Destinations	Notes
	0.0	0.0	I-74 / US 74 / US 74 Bus. west – Maxton, Laurinburg	
	5.0	8.0	NC 710 – Pembroke, Rowland	To University of North Carolina at Pembroke
Lumberton	15.5	24.9	I-74 / US 74 – Whiteville, Wilmington	
1.000 mi = 1.609 km; 1.000 km = 0.621 mi

=== Chadbourn–Whiteville business loop ===
U.S. Highway 74 Business
- Location: Chadbourn – Whiteville, NC
- Length: 12.3 mi (19.8 km)
- Existed: 1975–present

U.S. Route 74 Business (US 74 Bus) was established in 1975 to replace the old mainline US 74 through Chadbourn and Whiteville. The route is mostly in concurrency with US 76 Business.

Major junctions

The entire route is in Columbus County.

Location	mi	km	Destinations	Notes
	0.0	0.0	Future I-74 / US 74 west / NC 130 north / NC 410 – Laurinburg, Bladenboro, Whiteville	West end of NC 130 and north end of NC 410 overlap
Chadbourn	1.9	3.1	US 76 / US 76 Bus. – Fair Bluff, Whiteville	West end of US 76 Bus. overlap
Chadbourn	2.1	3.4	NC 410 south (Brown Street) – Chadbourn, Tabor City	South end of NC 410 overlap
Whiteville	9.2	14.8	US 701 / NC 130 east (Powell Boulevard) – Tabor City, Clarkton, Elizabethtown	East end of NC 130 overlap
Whiteville	9.5	15.3	US 701 Bus. (Pinckney Street/Madison Street)	Roundabout
	12.1	19.5	NC 214 east (Sam Potts Highway) – Hallsboro	
	12.3	19.8	Future I-74 / US 74 / US 76 – Wilmington, Laurinburg	
1.000 mi = 1.609 km; 1.000 km = 0.621 mi: Concurrency terminus

== Former ==
=== Rutherfordton alternate route ===
U.S. Highway 74A
- Location: Rutherfordton, North Carolina
- Length: 2.2 mi (3.5 km)
- Existed: 1949–1960

U.S. Route 74 Alternate (US 74A) was established in 1948 or 1949, it followed the original US 74 route through Rutherfordton, as the mainline US 74 was placed on a new bypass route through Ruth. Traversing along Washington Street and Charlotte Road, it was renumbered US 74 Business in 1960.

=== Shelby alternate route ===
U.S. Highway 74A
- Location: Shelby, North Carolina
- Length: 6.2 mi (10.0 km)
- Existed: 1936–1960

U.S. Route 74 Alternate (US 74A) was established in 1936 as a new primary routing using Marion Street through Shelby; paralleling mainline US 74, which was on Warren Street. Around 1949, US 74 was moved onto new bypass south of Shelby; US 74A was thus extended on both directions. As part of this development, US 74A was split west on Marion Street and east on Warren Street. In 1960 it was renumbered to US 74 Business.

=== Bessemer City alternate route ===
U.S. Highway 74A
- Location: Bessemer City, North Carolina
- Length: 10.0 mi (16.1 km)
- Existed: 1937–1938

U.S. Route 74 Alternate (US 74A) was established in 1937, this alternate route, along with US 29A, followed the old routing from Kings Mountain to Gastonia, via Bessemer City. A year later, it was renumbered as NC 161 and NC 274.

=== Monroe alternate route 1 ===
U.S. Highway 74A
- Location: Monroe, North Carolina
- Length: 0.4 mi (640 m)
- Existed: 1949–1952

U.S. Route 74 Alternate (US 74A) was established between 1945 and 1949, it was set up as an inner bypass of downtown Monroe, via Jefferson Street. It was decommissioned in 1952 when US 74 moved out of the downtown area, converting the old route, along Charlotte Avenue and Franklin Street, into the second alternate route.

=== Monroe alternate route 2 ===
U.S. Highway 74A
- Location: Monroe, North Carolina
- Existed: 1952–1954

U.S. Route 74 Alternate (US 74A) was established in 1952, it replaced the old mainline US 74 through downtown Monroe, via Franklin Street and Charlotte Avenue. In 1953, it was rerouted along Skyway Drive when US 74 was completely realigned onto new bypass routing between Matthews and Monroe. In 1954, it was decommissioned.

=== Rockingham alternate route ===
U.S. Highway 74A
- Location: Rockingham, North Carolina
- Existed: 1953–1957

U.S. Route 74 Alternate (US 74A) was established between 1951 and 1953, after US 74 was rerouted south of downtown Rockingham. The alternate route followed the old alignment along Washington Street and Rockingham Road. In 1957 it was decommissioned.

=== Leland alternate route ===
U.S. Highway 74A
- Location: Leland, North Carolina
- Length: 0.14 mi (230 m)
- Existed: 1936–1975

U.S. Route 74 Alternate (US 74A) was established in 1936, it replaced mainline US 74 through an intersection in Leland, while the mainline was moved just off to the right on Village Road. At 0.14 miles (0.23 km), it was the shortest alternate route. It was unsigned throughout its existence, but was marked on state and county maps up until 1975, when NCDOT downgraded it to secondary road status.

=== Wrightsville Beach alternate route ===
U.S. Highway 74A
- Location: Wrightsville Beach, North Carolina
- Existed: 1938–1940

U.S. Route 74 Alternate (US 74A) was established by 1938 as new primary routing, it went from Causeway Drive south along Waynick Boulevard, ending on the south-end of Wrightsville Beach; making it a spur route of US 74. By 1940, it was replaced by an extension of US 76.

== See also ==
- List of special routes of the United States Numbered Highway System
