= List of mountain passes in North Carolina =

The following is a list of mountain passes and gaps in the U.S. state of North Carolina.

Name	Mountain range	County	Elevation	Coordinates	Primary access route	Other access route(s)	GNIS
Air Bellows Gap	Brushy Mountains	Alleghany	3,727 feet (1,136 m)	36°25′41″N 81°07′38″W	Air Bellows Gap Road	Blue Ridge Parkway	980067
Alder Gap	Blue Ridge Mountains	Ashe	3,051 feet (930 m)	36°22′10″N 81°17′23″W	Blue Ridge Parkway		980081
Baldwin Gap	Stone Mountains	Ashe	3,481 feet (1,061 m)	36°25′24″N 81°43′11″W	Baldwin Gap Road		980485
Balsam Gap	Balsam Mountains	Haywood–Jackson	3,316 feet (1,011 m)	35°26′02″N 83°04′40″W	US 23 / US 74	Blue Ridge Parkway	1008907
Bearpen Gap	Blue Ridge Mountains	Avery	3,848 feet (1,173 m)	36°10′00″N 81°55′22″W			1009035
Bearpen Gap	Blue Ridge Mountains	Avery	3,704 feet (1,129 m)	35°57′59″N 82°02′55″W			1009034
Bradley Gap	Blue Ridge Mountains	Avery	4,974 feet (1,516 m)	36°07′59″N 82°01′20″W	Appalachian Trail		981810
Buck Creek Gap	Blue Ridge Mountains	McDowell–Yancey	3,402 feet (1,037 m)	35°46′15″N 82°09′52″W	NC 80	Blue Ridge Parkway	1009733
Buck Hill Gap	Blue Ridge Mountains	Avery	3,661 feet (1,116 m)	36°00′28″N 82°00′22″W			1009744
Buckeye Gap	Blue Ridge Mountains	Avery	5,128 feet (1,563 m)	36°06′47″N 82°03′43″W	Appalachian Trail		1009768
Bull Gap	Great Craggy Mountains	Buncombe	3,107 feet (947 m)	35°40′11″N 82°28′16″W	Blue Ridge Parkway		1009803
Calloway Gap	Blue Ridge Mountains	Ashe–Wilkes	3,432 feet (1,046 m)	36°17′05″N 81°23′17″W	Calloway Gap Road / Lump Road	Blue Ridge Parkway	982435
Cannon Gap	Blue Ridge Mountains	Avery	3,917 feet (1,194 m)	36°13′22″N 81°55′30″W	Beech Mountain Road		1010022
Cherry Gap	Blue Ridge Mountains	Avery	4,147 feet (1,264 m)	36°09′39″N 81°55′06″W			1010214
Cow Camp Gap	Blue Ridge Mountains	Avery	4,045 feet (1,233 m)	36°03′45″N 81°57′07″W	Cow Camp Road		1010518
Cowee Gap	Cowee Mountains	Jackson–Macon	4,199 feet (1,280 m)	35°05′27″N 83°08′52″W	US 64		1010524
Craven Gap	Great Craggy Mountains	Buncombe	3,132 feet (955 m)	35°38′52″N 82°29′27″W	Blue Ridge Parkway	NC 694	1010567
Cut Laurel Gap	Stone Mountains	Ashe	3,750 feet (1,140 m)	36°32′11″N 81°42′18″W	Cut Laurel Gap Road		1010627
Dave Gap	Blue Ridge Mountains	Avery	2,736 feet (834 m)	36°15′21″N 81°54′12″W	Buckeye Road		1010666
Deals Gap	Great Smoky Mountains	Swain	1,988 feet (606 m)	35°28′25″N 83°55′15″W	US 129		1307389
Deep Gap	Brushy Mountains	Alleghany	3,186 feet (971 m)	36°26′25″N 81°04′49″W	Mahagony Rock Road	Blue Ridge Parkway	984079
Bearpen Gap	Blue Ridge Mountains	Avery	4,186 feet (1,276 m)	36°03′25″N 81°50′45″W			1010752
Deep Gap	Blue Ridge Mountains	Avery	4,318 feet (1,316 m)	36°03′23″N 82°03′24″W			1010751
Deep Gap	Blue Ridge Mountains	Watauga	3,127 feet (953 m)	36°13′46″N 81°13′00″W	US 421	Blue Ridge Parkway	984077
Doublehead Gap	Blue Ridge Mountains	Avery	3,825 feet (1,166 m)	36°02′50″N 82°02′07″W	Doublehead Mountain Road		1010887
Grandmother Gap	Blue Ridge Mountains	Avery	4,075 feet (1,242 m)	36°04′35″N 81°50′05″W	Blue Ridge Parkway		1011600
Hanging Rock Gap	Blue Ridge Mountains	Avery	4,678 feet (1,426 m)	36°08′21″N 81°49′50″W	Skiview Road		986361
Harmon Gap	Blue Ridge Mountains	Avery	3,425 feet (1,044 m)	36°15′24″N 81°54′59″W	Beech Crossing		1017818
Hartley Gap	Blue Ridge Mountains	Avery	4,255 feet (1,297 m)	36°06′40″N 81°58′03″W			1011895
Haw Gap	Stone Mountains	Ashe	4,176 feet (1,273 m)	36°33′17″N 81°41′28″W			1011909
Haw Gap	Blue Ridge Mountains	Avery	3,881 feet (1,183 m)	36°04′38″N 81°58′24″W	Ivey Heights Road		1011908
Hewed Log Gap	Blue Ridge Mountains	Ashe	3,176 feet (968 m)	36°16′56″N 81°28′58″W	Idlewild Road		986675
Hickorynut Gap	Blue Ridge Mountains	Avery	4,327 feet (1,319 m)	36°07′42″N 81°54′26″W	Hickory Nut Gap Road		1012022
Horse Gap	Blue Ridge Mountains	Ashe–Wilkes	3,110 feet (950 m)	36°18′48″N 81°21′47″W	NC 16	Blue Ridge Parkway	987097
Laurel Knob Gap	Blue Ridge Mountains	Ashe	3,694 feet (1,126 m)	36°19′47″N 81°34′48″W	NC 194		988202
Lick Log Gap	Blue Ridge Mountains	Avery	3,409 feet (1,039 m)	36°03′03″N 82°00′01″W	Lick Log Road		1012848
Linville Gap	Blue Ridge Mountains	Avery	4,012 feet (1,223 m)	36°07′03″N 81°50′30″W	NC 105	NC 184	1012894
Loggy Gap	Blue Ridge Mountains	Avery	3,563 feet (1,086 m)	36°14′08″N 81°55′55″W	Sugar Mountain Road 1		1017819
Loggy Gap	Blue Ridge Mountains	Avery	3,953 feet (1,205 m)	36°05′40″N 81°54′10″W	Beech Mountain Road		1013084
Low Gap	Blue Ridge Mountains	Ashe	3,104 feet (946 m)	36°24′15″N 81°21′20″W	Low Gap Road		989079
Low Gap	Blue Ridge Mountains	Avery	5,049 feet (1,539 m)	36°06′45″N 82°03′58″W	Appalachian Trail		1013229
Low Notch	Blue Ridge Mountains	Alleghany–Wilkes	3,497 feet (1,066 m)	36°25′57″N 81°09′48″W	Blue Ridge Parkway		989083
Miller Gap	Blue Ridge Mountains	Ashe	3,087 feet (941 m)	36°20′39″N 81°22′28″W	Trading Post Road	Blue Ridge Parkway	990004
Miller Gap	Blue Ridge Mountains	Avery	3,743 feet (1,141 m)	36°03′54″N 81°55′17″W	NC 194	Avery County High School Road	1013588
Montezuma Gap	Blue Ridge Mountains	Avery	3,875 feet (1,181 m)	36°03′54″N 81°53′47″W	NC 181	Old State Highway 181	1013657
Newfound Gap	Great Smoky Mountains	Swain	5,048 feet (1,539 m)	35°36′40″N 83°25′30″W	US 441	Appalachian Trail	1000706
Old House Gap	Blue Ridge Mountains	Avery	3,008 feet (917 m)	36°03′51″N 81°48′34″W	Old House Gap Road		1014097
Payne Gap	Stone Mountains	Ashe	3,241 feet (988 m)	36°29′30″N 81°41′43″W	Big Laurel Road	Rash School Road	1000708
Phillips Gap	Blue Ridge Mountains	Ashe–Wilkes	3,209 feet (978 m)	36°15′51″N 81°26′06″W	Phillips Gap Road	Blue Ridge Parkway	992147
Richs Gap	Blue Ridge Mountains	Avery	4,026 feet (1,227 m)	36°02′56″N 82°02′36″W			1014879
Roaring Gap	Blue Ridge Mountains	Alleghany–Wilkes	2,907 feet (886 m)	36°23′57″N 80°58′41″W	Roaring Gap Road		1959945
Russell Gap	Brushy Mountains	Alexander–Wilkes	1,611 feet (491 m)	36°01′49″N 81°14′07″W	Russell Gap Road		993818
Smoky Gap	Blue Ridge Mountains	Avery	3,714 feet (1,132 m)	36°07′46″N 81°56′03″W	NC 194	Blevins Creek Road	1015619
Snyder Gap	Stone Mountains	Ashe	3,402 feet (1,037 m)	36°24′04″N 81°44′14″W	Brushy Fork Road		995082
Soco Gap	Balsam Mountains	Haywood–Jackson	4,340 feet (1,320 m)	35°29′43″N 83°09′23″W	US 19	Blue Ridge Parkway	995093
Sugar Gap	Blue Ridge Mountains	Avery	4,419 feet (1,347 m)	36°07′53″N 81°53′00″W			1015920
Willen Gap	Stone Mountains	Ashe	3,497 feet (1,066 m)	36°27′55″N 81°41′50″W	Parker Road		997348
Yellow Mountain Gap	Blue Ridge Mountains	Avery	4,662 feet (1,421 m)	36°07′33″N 82°03′06″W	Appalachian Trail		997713
