= U.S. Route 74 Alternate (Asheville–Forest City, North Carolina) =

Alternate route of U.S. 74 in Western North Carolina

U.S. Highway 74A
- US 74A highlighted in red

Route information
- Auxiliary route of US 74
- Maintained by NCDOT
- Length: 60 mi (97 km)
- Existed: 1994–present
- Tourist routes: Drovers Road; Black Mountain Rag

Major junctions
- West end: US 19 / US 23 / I-40 / US 74 in Asheville
- I-240 / I-26 / US 70 / US 19 / US 23 / US 25 in downtown Asheville; NC 81 in Asheville; I-240 in east Asheville; NC 9 in Bat Cave; US 64 in Bat Cave; NC 9 in Lake Lure; US 221 in Rutherfordton; US 64 in Ruth; US 74 Bus. / US 221A in Rutherfordton
- East end: US 74 in Forest City

Location
- Country: United States
- State: North Carolina
- Counties: Buncombe, Henderson, Rutherford

Highway system
- United States Numbered Highway System; List; Special; Divided; North Carolina Highway System; Interstate; US; State; Scenic
← US 74	→ NC 75

U.S. Route 74 Alternate (US 74A or US 74-A) is an alternate route of U.S. Route 74 in Western North Carolina, running from the town of Forest City to the city of Asheville. It replaced US 74's former mainline route in 1994, when its parent highway was moved onto a new freeway alignment running from Forest City to I-26 in Columbus, North Carolina, and from there to I-40 and US 23 in Enka, North Carolina. Its alignment, a narrow, winding road, greatly differs from US 74 today, straying from its parent route by as much as ~14 miles, separated by as much as half an hour of driving time. Throughout its routing, it is in Buncombe, Henderson, and Rutherford counties.

US 74A was established in 1994, replacing the old mainline US 74 route when US 74 was moved onto the Solon David Smart Memorial Highway and I-26. The alignment of US 74A varies greatly from the current parent route. US 74A traverses through downtown Asheville, goes through the mountain resort communities of Chimney Rock and Lake Lure, continues to Ruth, passes between the towns of Rutherfordton and Spindale, and bypasses Forest City to the south. US 74, joins I-40 eastbound west of Asheville, and switches onto I-26 eastbound through Fletcher, bypassing most of urban Asheville. Continuing along a southeasterly course, the parent US 74 passes by Hendersonville and splits from I-26 at Columbus; after passing south of Rutherfordton, US 74 meets the eastern terminus of US 74A.

US 74A is concurrent with US 64 from Ruth in the east through Lake Lure, where NC 9 joins, and Chimney Rock; the three routes separate in Bat Cave. NC 9 splits to the north, US 64 to the south; US 74A alone continues west from that point. In Asheville, US 74A has many concurrencies; US 70 is concurrent with US 74A in east and downtown Asheville and Interstate 26, I-240, US 19/US 23 are concurrent with US 74A west of downtown. Near US 74A's western terminus, US 19/US 23 are concurrent with US 74A. NC 81 overlaps with US 74A for a short 1-mile (1.6 km) segment in southeast Asheville. Between Asheville and Gerton, US 74A bears the street name Charlotte Highway. East of Gerton, the road is named the Gerton Highway until arriving at Bat Cave. Through towns and cities, the road takes various names including Main Street and Railroad Avenue.

US 74A is overlapped by two North Carolina scenic byways: Drovers Road (Asheville to Bat Cave) and Black Mountain Rag (Bat Cave to Lake Lure).

== Route description ==
=== Buncombe and Henderson counties ===
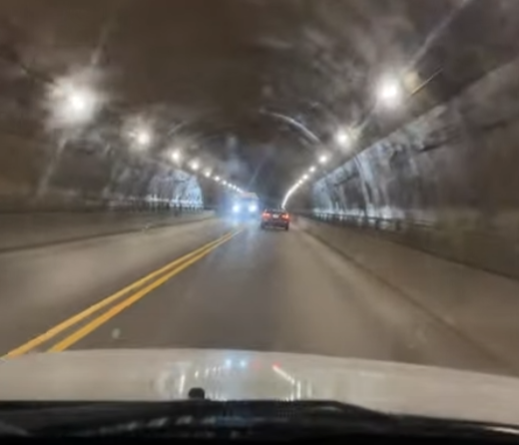
US 74A in the Beaucatcher Tunnel

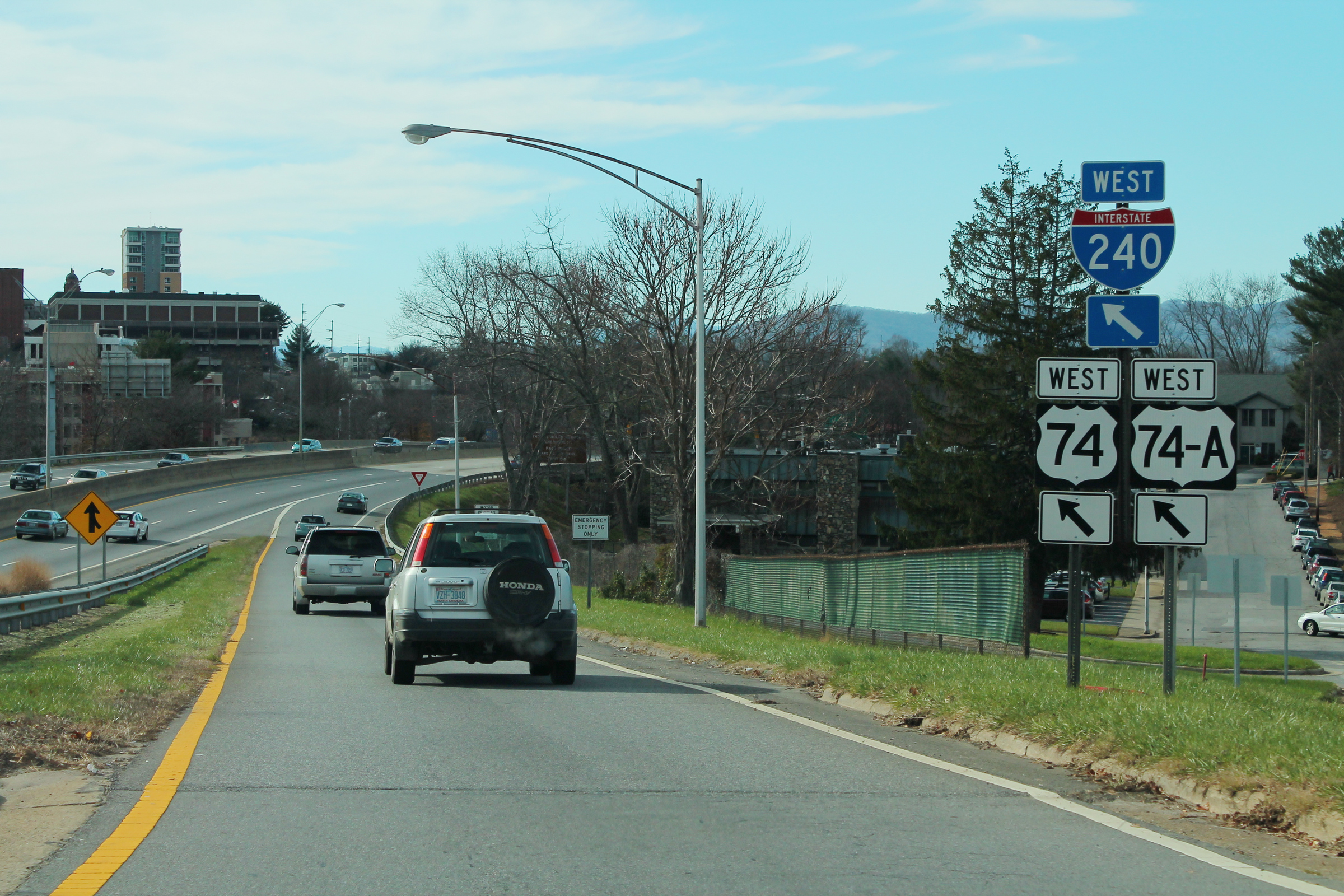
US 74A runs with I-240 in Downtown Asheville for much of the latter route's distance.

US 74A begins at an interchange with US 19, US 23, I-40, and mainline US 74 in west Asheville, and briefly assumes the name Smokey Park Highway before becoming Patton Avenue, a major thoroughfare in the city. It heads northeast through a suburban area, lined with strip malls and housing developments, for about four miles before encountering I-240. Its concurrency with this route is brief, lasting for only a few miles in order to cross the French Broad River and bypass most of downtown Asheville. After departing from I-240 and briefly running on Charlotte Street and College Street, it goes through the Beaucatcher Tunnel and under Beaucatcher Mountain, emerging on the other side to a more suburban area. This section of US 74A is known as Tunnel Road. The route proceeds to make several turns onto roads such as Swannanoa River Road (Where it runs briefly with NC 81) and Fairview Road before using its final interchange with I-240 and I-40 to emerge onto Charlotte Highway, a four-lane highway with a center turning lane, where it continues uninterrupted for some distance.

After passing more shopping centers, the highway assumes a more rural character as it departs the suburbs for Buncombe County's rural outlands. It proceeds through the census-designated place and unincorporated community of Fairview, becoming a two-lane road and encountering several curves and bends, before entering Henderson County. Trucks are not recommended on this stretch of the road.

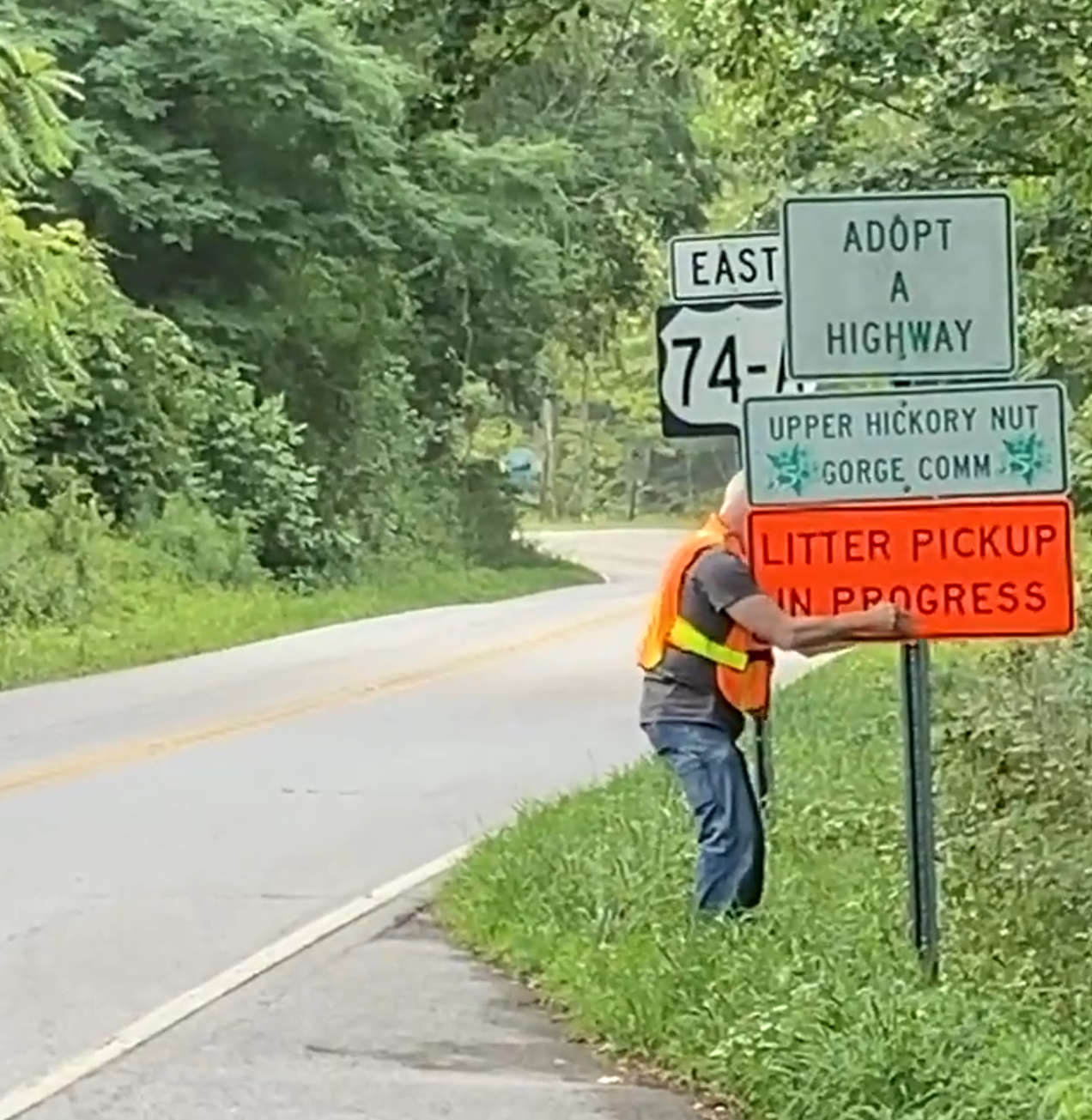
Gerton is the site of North Carolina's longest-running Adopt-A-Highway program, started in 1988.

US 74A's routing in Henderson County is brief, lasting for approximately 6.7 miles. It first encounters the unincorporated community of Gerton, becoming Gerton Highway, at the head of a narrow gorge and at Hickory Creek, which will later become the Broad River. The road in Gerton is flat and mostly straight, and immediately upon exiting the town it encounters a curvier section, paralleling Hickory Creek and briefly encountering the Florence Nature Preserve. After a few miles, it enters Bat Cave, first encountering the Broad River, which it also parallels. In the town, it assumes a concurrency with US 64 and NC 9; this is the former route's first interaction of many with US 74 in Western North Carolina when heading west.

=== Rutherford County ===
Not long after leaving Bat Cave, US 74A enters Rutherford County and the resort town of Chimney Rock. In this area, the road is vulnerable to flash flooding, and it was severely damaged in 1916, 1996, and 2024 by particularly extreme cases. US 74A travels through the community's downtown area, lined with shops and providing access to Chimney Rock State Park. Now well into the Hickory Nut Gorge, views of Chimney Rock Mountain are available. After leaving the town, the road briefly stops paralleling the Broad River for approximately 5.6 miles, and instead winds along the shores of Lake Lure, also encountering the community of the same name. US 74A serves as the main access road for numerous vacation spots and recreational sites in the town. While in Lake Lure, NC 9 departs from the road to the south, eventually reaching South Carolina and continuing as South Carolina Highway 9.

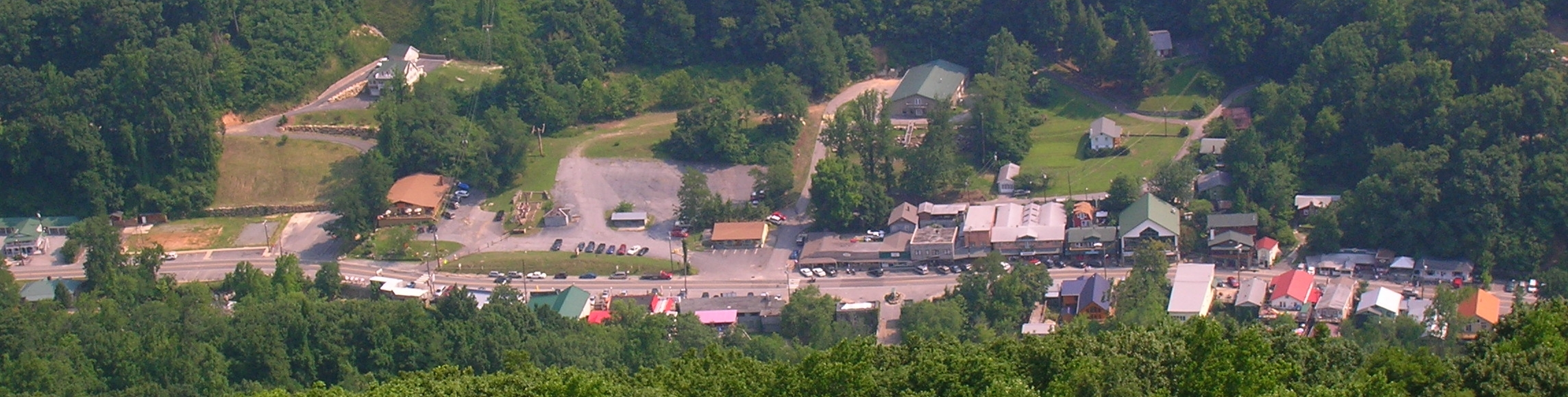
US 74A through the town of Chimney Rock

US 74A once again begins to follow the course of the Broad River for a few more miles, assuming a rural character once more, as it begins its descent to Rutherfordton. After traveling through the unincorporated community of Green Hill, it assumes a straighter course.

Eventually, the highway interchanges with US 221, bypassing downtown Rutherfordton. Shortly thereafter, it enters the community of Ruth, where US 64 departs from the road and heads toward Morganton. By now, it is in a much less mountainous area, in the foothills of the Appalachians. US 74A begins to head in a more southerly direction, and it becomes a four-lane road upon encountering College Avenue and intersecting US 221A. It interchanges and intersects with various local roads before terminating at mainline US 74. The original alignment of US 74, which US 74A is partially on, continues eastward as US 74 Business until Mooresboro, in Cleveland County.

== History ==
=== Beginnings ===
US 74A's routing may be situated closely along the route of a Cherokee trail connecting Western North Carolina to the state's Piedmont. By the early-mid 1840s, this road would later become a sand and gravel turnpike road known as the Drover's Turnpike or Drovers Road, used by early mountain settlers who herded livestock along their way to markets beyond the mountains. This road was a critical link for settlers in this region of Western North Carolina, as the rivers were not navigable and railroad service was still decades into the future. It additionally served as a link for Union Army activity during Stoneman's 1865 raid.

==== 1916 floods and hurricanes ====
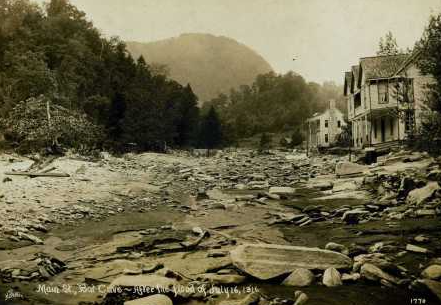
What is now US 74A in Bat Cave, North Carolina, the roadbed being completely destroyed by the 1916 floods

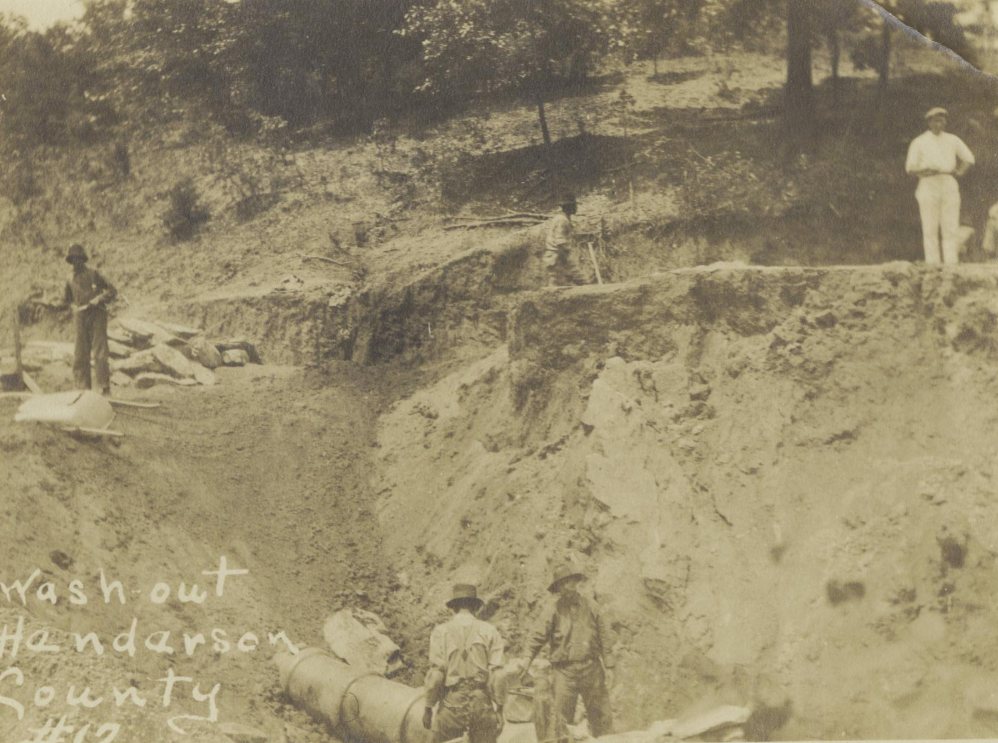
What is now US 74A in Henderson County, washed out by the 1916 floods

In July 1916, the road was severely damaged during severe rains, known as the Great Flood of 1916. These heavy rains, the worst in the area's history, were caused by the 1916 Gulf Coast Hurricane and the 1916 Charleston Hurricane, both hitting the area in early-mid July. The Weather Bureau remarked "In some respects it was the most extraordinary rainfall of which there is any authentic record in this country," and the 24-hour rainfall record from the event remains unbroken for the state. This flood wiped out improvements that were made in prior years by Locke Craig, former governor of North Carolina. Hickory Creek had been rerouted by the rains, necessitating sections of the road to be reworked and relocated due to the stream cutting through the former roadbed. It would later be paved through 1923 and 1924. Not long after, the Lake Lure Dam was built, submerging parts of the original road and necessitating another reconstruction of these segments. These reconstructions established what is today the roadbed of US 74A, and US 74 was designated on it in 1927. US 74A would later be similarly damaged in 2024, 108 years later, by Hurricane Helene.

=== Designation of US 74A ===
US 74A received its current designation when the mainline US 74 was relocated to a new, mostly limited-access route between Forest City and Asheville via Hendersonville and I-26. This relocation, which followed previous changes such as a freeway upgrade in 1970 that bypassed Mooresboro, Ellenboro, Forest City, and Spindale, completed the twinning of the route and rendered the original alignment obsolete.

However, US 74A does not follow the entire original alignment through the area. The section from Mooresboro to Forest City became US 74 Business, while US 74A was assigned to a portion of the original freeway built in 1970, splitting off from US 74 at Forest City, before rejoining the pre-74A alignment in Ruth.

The road is the ninth existing iteration of US 74A, and follows most of the path of the original NC 20. Many of the prior iterations of US 74A existed near the present-day US 74A in the area, such as the second iteration of the route, which took surface roads through downtown Shelby. The sixth iteration was created in the late 1940s, when US 74 was given its first bypass of Rutherfordton via Ruth. This route would be re-designated US 74 Business in 1960. Overall, the route has not changed much since its inception in 1994.

=== Later developments ===
US 74A is the site of North Carolina's first and longest-lasting Adopt-A-Highway program, started in 1988 by local residents of Gerton at the Upper Hickory Nut Gorge community center. The community center officially initiated the program with the governor that year, and their program to keep the road and surrounding right-of-way clean existed on an unofficial basis before then.

Not long after US 74A was established, it was subject to a major flash flood in September 1996, as a result of Hurricane Fran.

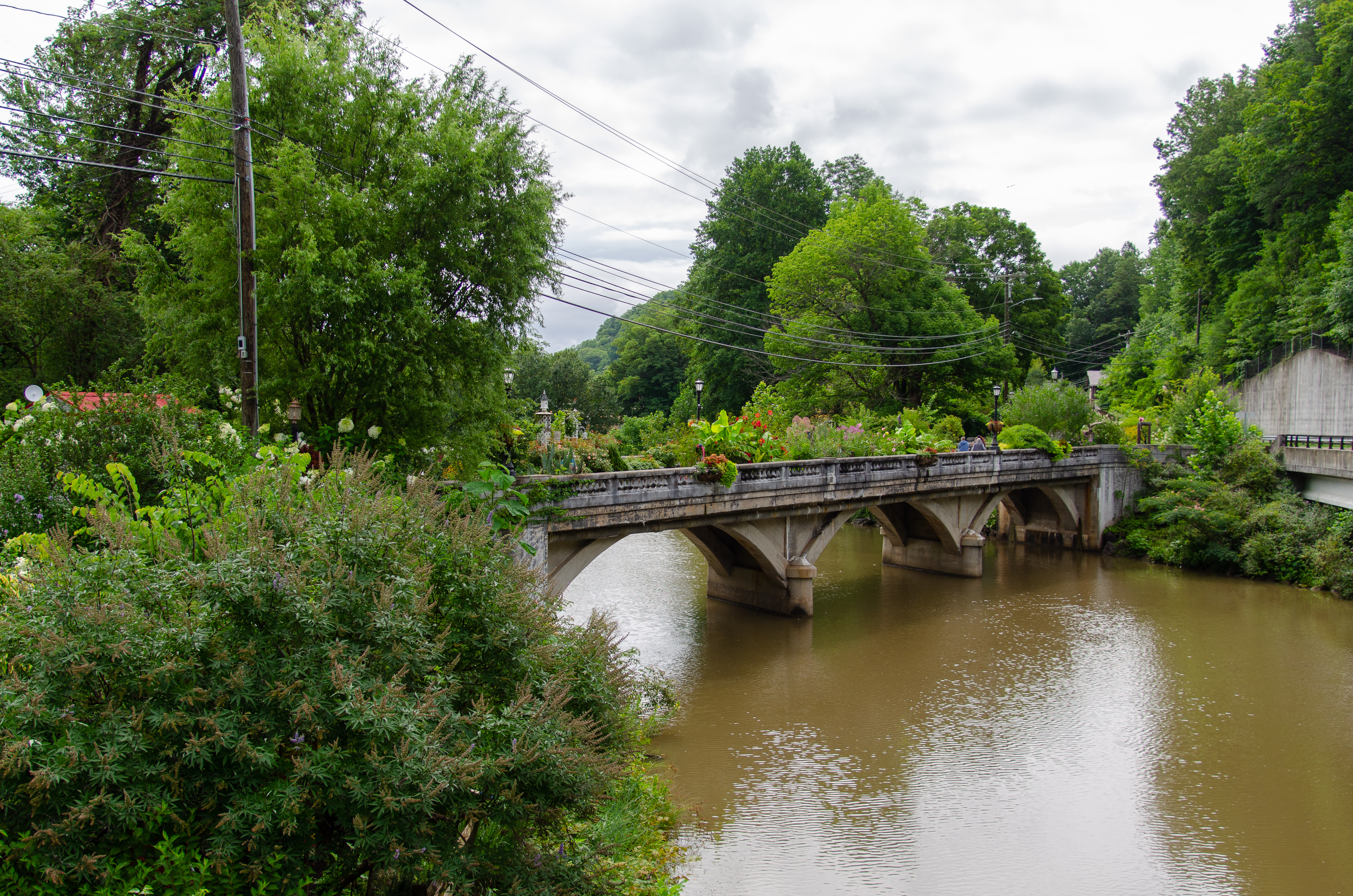
The Lake Lure Flowering Bridge in Summer 2021

In 2013, the original bridge carrying US 74A, built in 1927 and put out of use in 2010 when a wider replacement was completed, was converted into a garden known as the Lake Lure Flowering Bridge. The bridge was the subject of a 2016 TED Talk by local retiree William Miller, who spearheaded the project.

==== 2024 floods and Hurricane Helene ====
In late September 2024, as a result of Hurricane Helene, US 74A suffered catastrophic damage, not unlike that of the 1916 floods. In several spots the road was made impassable—it was inundated, log jams were deposited on the road, sections had collapsed due to swollen waterways and landslides, and it was blocked by debris flows. Through Chimney Rock, the road was destroyed, along with the vast majority of the town itself. The Lake Lure Flowering Bridge was also destroyed in the floods.

== Future ==
Two bridges carrying US 74A in Rutherford County are due to be replaced, while a roundabout is scheduled to replace US 74A's intersection with North Washington Street in Rutherfordton. Following the damage of Hurricane Helene, the road must undergo major reconstructions again, for the third time in its history.

== Major intersections ==
County	Location	mi	km	Exit	Destinations	Notes
Buncombe	Asheville	0.00	0.00		US 19 / US 23 south (Smokey Park Highway south) / I-40 / US 74 – Canton	Western end of US 19/US 23 concurrency; western terminus; I-40 exit 44; highway continues south as US 19/US 23
Buncombe	Asheville	3.2	5.1		NC 63 north (Leicester Highway) – Leicester	
Buncombe	Asheville	4.0	6.4		I-240 west to Future I-26 / I-40	Southern end of I-240/I-26 concurrency
Buncombe	Asheville	4.4	7.1	3B	Westgate Parkway / Resort Drive	Exit numbers follow I-240
Buncombe	Asheville	4.8	7.7	4A	Future I-26 / US 70 west / US 19 / US 23 north – UNC Asheville, Weaverville, Woodfin	Northern end of I-26 and US 19/US 23 concurrencies; western end of US 70 concurrency
Buncombe	Asheville	5.0	8.0	4B	Patton Avenue – Downtown	No westbound exit
Buncombe	Asheville	5.5	8.9	4C	Montford Avenue / Haywood Street	
Buncombe	Asheville	6.0	9.7	5A	US 25 (Merrimon Avenue)	Eastbound entrance includes direct entrance ramp from Woodfin Street
Buncombe	Asheville	6.2	10.0		I-240 east – Oteen	Eastern end of I-240 concurrency; I-240 exit 5B
Buncombe	Asheville	6.5	10.5		NC 694 north (Town Mountain Road)	Southern terminus of NC 694
Buncombe	Asheville				Beaucatcher Tunnel	
Buncombe	Asheville	7.5	12.1		I-240	I-240 exit 6; access to I-240 east via Chunns Cove Road
Buncombe	Asheville	8.0	12.9		US 70 east (Tunnel Road east)	Eastern end of US 70 concurrency
Buncombe	Asheville	8.7	14.0		NC 81 west (Swannanoa River Road west) – Biltmore Forest	Western end of NC 81 concurrency
Buncombe	Asheville	10.0	16.1		NC 81 east (Swannanoa River Road east) – Swannanoa	Eastern end of NC 81 concurrency
Buncombe	Asheville	10.5	16.9		I-240 west	Western end of I-240 concurrency; I-240 exit 8
Buncombe	Asheville	11.0	17.7		I-240 ends / I-40 – Statesville, Knoxville	Eastern end of I-240 concurrency; I-240 exit 9; I-40 exit 53
Buncombe	Asheville	11.8	19.0		Blue Ridge Parkway	Right-in/right-out interchange in both directions
Henderson	Bat Cave	28.7	46.2		NC 9 north – Black Mountain	Western end of NC 9 concurrency
Henderson	Bat Cave	28.8	46.3		US 64 west – Hendersonville	Western end of US 64 concurrency
Rutherford	Lake Lure	36.0	57.9		NC 9 south – Mill Spring	Eastern end of NC 9 concurrency
Rutherford	Rutherfordton	52.0	83.7		US 221 – Marion	Interchange
Rutherford	Ruth	52.5	84.5		US 64 east – Morganton	Eastern end of US 64 concurrency
Rutherford	Rutherfordton	54.0	86.9		US 74 Bus. / US 221A – Spindale, Forest City	
Rutherford	Spindale				Oakland Road Spindale	Interchange; eastbound signage Interchange; westbound signage
Rutherford	Forest City	60.0	96.6		US 74 – Columbus, Asheville, Shelby	Interchange; eastern terminus
1.000 mi = 1.609 km; 1.000 km = 0.621 mi: Concurrency terminus; Incomplete access

== See also ==
- Special routes of U.S. Route 74
