= North Carolina Highway 9 =

State highway in North Carolina, US

North Carolina Highway 9
- NC 9 highlighted in red

Route information
- Maintained by NCDOT
- Length: 46.4 mi (74.7 km)
- Existed: 1938–present

Major junctions
- South end: SC 9 at the South Carolina state line near Green Creek
- US 74 in Beulah; US 64 / US 74A in Lake Lure; I-40 in Black Mountain; US 70 in Black Mountain
- North end: Montreat Road near Montreat

Location
- Country: United States
- State: North Carolina
- Counties: Polk, Rutherford, Henderson, Buncombe

Highway system
- North Carolina Highway System; Interstate; US; State; Scenic
← NC 8	→ NC 10

North Carolina Highway 9 (NC 9) is a 46.4-mile (74.7 km) primary state highway in the U.S. state of North Carolina. It serves as a connector route from South Carolina Highway 9 to eastern portions of the Appalachians around Asheville.

== Route description ==
NC 9 meets SC 9 at the state border. SC 9 is one of South Carolina's most important state highways, although it is less so in North Carolina. NC 9 begins in Polk County south of the Green Creek community.

NC 9 is co-signed with US 64/74A in the city of Lake Lure. This is about 20 miles (32 km) north of the southern terminus.

After crossing into Buncombe County NC 9 crosses over the Eastern Continental Divide at Lakey Gap and crosses I-40 at exit 64.

The 18-mile (29 km) stretch of NC 9 from Bat Cave north to Black Mountain has been designated as a North Carolina Scenic Highway. It is known as The Sidewinder in the motorcycle community, many scenic and curvy roads in the NC mountains have nicknames, as well. In addition to the scenery, it is a hilly and twisty route with some steep grades. A sign heading south from Black Mountain points out that heavy trucks are prohibited.

The highway runs through the town of Black Mountain (15 miles (24 km) east of Asheville). Nearly 3 miles (4.8 km) after crossing I-40, NC 9 ends at the vaulted archway entrance to the town of Montreat.

== History ==
1930-1937: There was a previous NC 9 before the current day routing and was known as Leesville Road. The first 9 dates from about 1930, and ran from Raleigh northwest to Durham. Today, part of that road is U.S. 70. It ran in conjunction with US 15A through downtown Raleigh in front of the Capitol Building. The original NC 9 lasted until late 1937, when it was renumbered as US 70A.

1938: NC 9 in Raleigh is renumbered, while NC 192 is renumbered to NC 9 from the SC Border to Lake Lure, and renumbering NC 119 from Chimney Rock Park (just north of Lake Lure) area north to Montreat. The number was chosen because of the SC 9 renumbering in early 1938.

1972: An I-40-related rerouting just south of downtown Black Mountain in 1972. In the years before the Interstate was built 9 entered town along Black Mountain Avenue, proceeding east onto Sutton Avenue before continuing north on Broadway Street. With the completion of I-40, NC 9 followed an extension of Broadway Street. This is the last major change.

=== North Carolina Highway 192 (1928-1937) ===
North Carolina Highway 192
- Location: SC state line–Lake Lure
- Length: 20.3 mi (32.7 km)
- Existed: 1928–1937

The first North Carolina Highway 192 (NC 192) was established as a new primary routing between NC 19, in Mill Spring, and US 74/NC 20, in Lake Lure. In 1931, NC 192 was extended southeast from Mill Spring along new primary routing to the South Carolina state line, where it continued as SC 177 towards Spartanburg. In late 1937, part of the renumbering effort for contiguous routes with South Carolina, NC 192 was redesignated as NC 9 to match SC 9, which replaced SC 177 the year prior.

== Major intersections ==
County	Location	mi	km	Destinations	Notes
Polk		0.0	0.0	SC 9 south – New Prospect	South Carolina state line
Polk	Beulah	8.2– 8.4	13.2– 13.5	US 74 – Rutherfordton, Forest City, Columbus, Asheville	Exit 167 (US 74); diamond interchange
Polk	Mill Spring	11.3	18.2	NC 108 – Tryon, Columbus, Rutherfordton	
Rutherford	Lake Lure	20.3	32.7	US 64 east / US 74A east (Memorial Highway) – Rutherfordton, Morganton	East end of concurrency with US 64/US 74A
Henderson	Bat Cave	27.5	44.3	US 64 west (Chimney Rock Road) – Hendersonville	West end of concurrency with US 64
Henderson	Bat Cave	27.7	44.6	US 74A west (Gerton Highway) – Gerton, Asheville	West end of concurrency with US 74A
Buncombe	Black Mountain	44.2– 44.4	71.1– 71.5	I-40 – Asheville, Morganton	Exit 64 (I-40); partial cloverleaf interchange
Buncombe	Black Mountain	44.8	72.1	US 70 (State Street)	
Buncombe	Montreat	46.4	74.7	Montreat Road, town entrance	
1.000 mi = 1.609 km; 1.000 km = 0.621 mi: Concurrency terminus
