= North Carolina Highway 108 =

State highway in North Carolina, US

North Carolina Highway 108

Route information
- Maintained by NCDOT
- Length: 22.1 mi (35.6 km)
- Existed: 1940–present

Major junctions
- West end: US 176 in Tryon
- I-26 in Columbus; US 74 near Columbus; NC 9 in Mill Spring
- East end: US 221 / US 74 Bus. / US 221A in Rutherfordton

Location
- Country: United States
- State: North Carolina
- Counties: Polk, Rutherford

Highway system
- North Carolina Highway System; Interstate; US; State; Scenic
← NC 107	→ NC 109

North Carolina Highway 108 (NC 108) is a 22-mile-long (35 km) two lane highway in North Carolina. It connects U.S. Route 176 (US 176) in Tryon to Rutherfordton and passes through both Polk County and Rutherford County. It is a rural country road through eastern Polk County and western Rutherford County, and moderately developed from Tryon through Columbus and in Rutherfordton. It is also known as Lynn Road between Tryon and Columbus, Mills Street through Columbus, and Tryon Road in Rutherford County. It was built in the year 1940.

== Route description ==
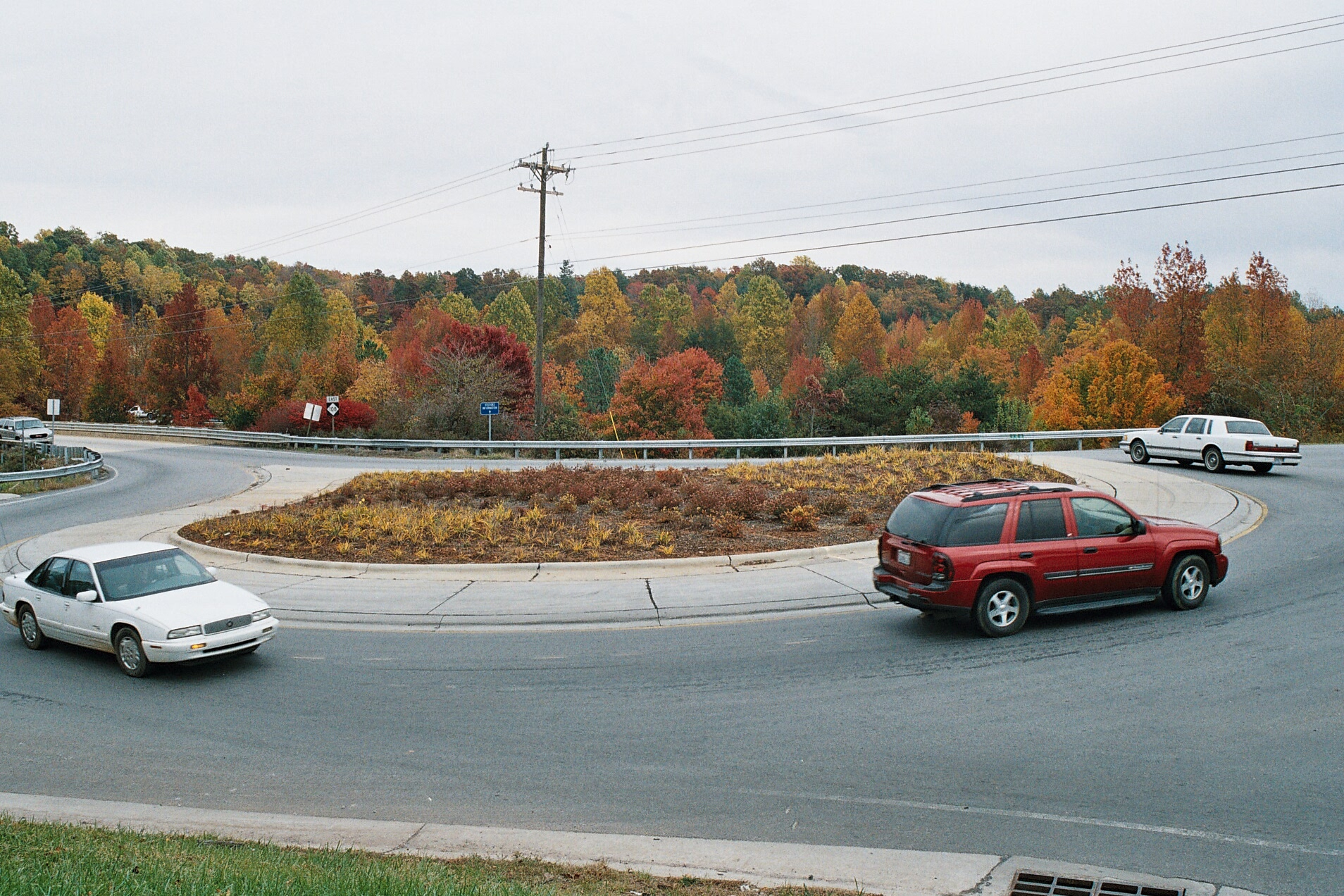
Roundabout on the west side of the N.C. 108 bridge over I-26 in Columbus.

NC 108 begins at US 176 in Tryon and travels east through the unincorporated town of Lynn, where it crosses the Pacolet River. NC 108 has an interchange with Interstate 26 (I-26) and US 74 in Columbus, and another interchange with US 74 east of Columbus. NC 108 passes through the center of Columbus, the county seat of Polk County, which is the most developed portion of the route in Polk County. Three miles (4.8 km) east of the second US 74 interchange, NC 108 intersects NC 9 at the unincorporated town of Mill Spring. The section from Tryon to Mill Spring closely follows the front range of the Blue Ridge Mountains. It passes over the Green River in Polk County and the Broad River in Rutherford County. NC 108 ends at the intersection of South Main Street (carrying US 221 and US 74 Business west) and Charlotte Road (carrying US 74 Business east and US 221A) in Rutherfordton.

NC 108 has two roundabouts at the I-26/US 74 interchange. These were constructed between 2004 and 2007 to improve the level of service at the interchange.

== Future ==
The NCDOT I-4729 Feasibility Study was completed in 2006 and recommended improvements to NC 108 at its interchange with I-26 in Columbus, including widening the facility to four lanes. The project was split into two sections, A and B, with the former including modifications to the I-26 and US 74 interchange. Construction of Section A began in 2017 and was completed in 2019. Section B will improve NC 108, including the construction of a new structure across I-26, but will only add a center turn lane west of the interchange. Construction was scheduled to begin in 2021, but has been delayed until 2029.

The Comprehensive Transportation Plan Study Report for Polk County, completed in October 2008 by the Transportation Planning Branch of the NCDOT, recommended upgrading NC 108 to a four-lane divided facility from its western terminus at US 176 in Tryon to the US 74 interchange east of Columbus. A project to widen NC 108 from I-26 to Tryon - R-5838 - was added to the STIP, but was later removed after receiving local opposition.

== Major intersections ==
County	Location	mi	km	Destinations	Notes
Polk	Tryon	0.0	0.0	US 176 (North Trade Street) – Saluda	
Polk	Columbus	3.4– 3.6	5.5– 5.8	I-26 to US 74 – Spartanburg, Saluda, Asheville	Exit 67 (I-26) and Exit 161 (US 74)
Polk		5.1– 5.3	8.2– 8.5	US 74 to I-26 – Forest City, Asheville	Exit 163 (US 74)
Polk	Mill Spring	8.4	13.5	NC 9 – Spartanburg, Lake Lure, Chimney Rock	
Rutherford	Rutherfordton	22.1	35.6	US 221 (South Main Street) / US 74 Bus. / US 221A south (Charlotte Road)	Northern terminus of US 221A
1.000 mi = 1.609 km; 1.000 km = 0.621 mi
