= Interstate 240 (North Carolina) =

Highway in North Carolina

Interstate 240
- Billy Graham Freeway
- I-240 highlighted in red

Route information
- Auxiliary route of I-40
- Maintained by NCDOT
- Length: 9.14 mi (14.71 km)
- Existed: 1980–present
- NHS: Entire route

Major junctions
- West end: I-26 / I-40 / US 74 in Asheville
- US 19 / US 23 / US 74A in Asheville; US 19 / US 23 / US 70 in Asheville
- East end: I-40 / US 74A in Asheville

Location
- Country: United States
- State: North Carolina
- Counties: Buncombe

Highway system
- Interstate Highway System; Main; Auxiliary; Suffixed; Business; Future; North Carolina Highway System; Interstate; US; State; Scenic
| ← NC 231 | → NC 241 |

Interstate 240 (I-240), also known as the Billy Graham Freeway, is a 9.1-mile-long (14.6 km) Interstate Highway loop in the US state of North Carolina. It serves as an urban connector for Asheville and runs in a semicircle around the north of the city's downtown district between exits 53B and 46B of I-40. Between those points, I-40 continues in an east–west direction further south of the city, roughly parallel to the Swannanoa and French Broad rivers. The western segment of I-240 is now being cosigned with I-26 as part of a larger project extending I-26 from its former western terminus at I-40/I-240 to U.S. Highway 23 (US 23) near Kingsport, Tennessee. However, NCDOT officially identifies this part of I-26 as Future 26.

Years prior to the loop's completion, I-240 was known as I-140; however, no signage was ever posted for I-140. The I-140 designation has now been given to a spur route in Wilmington.

== Route description ==
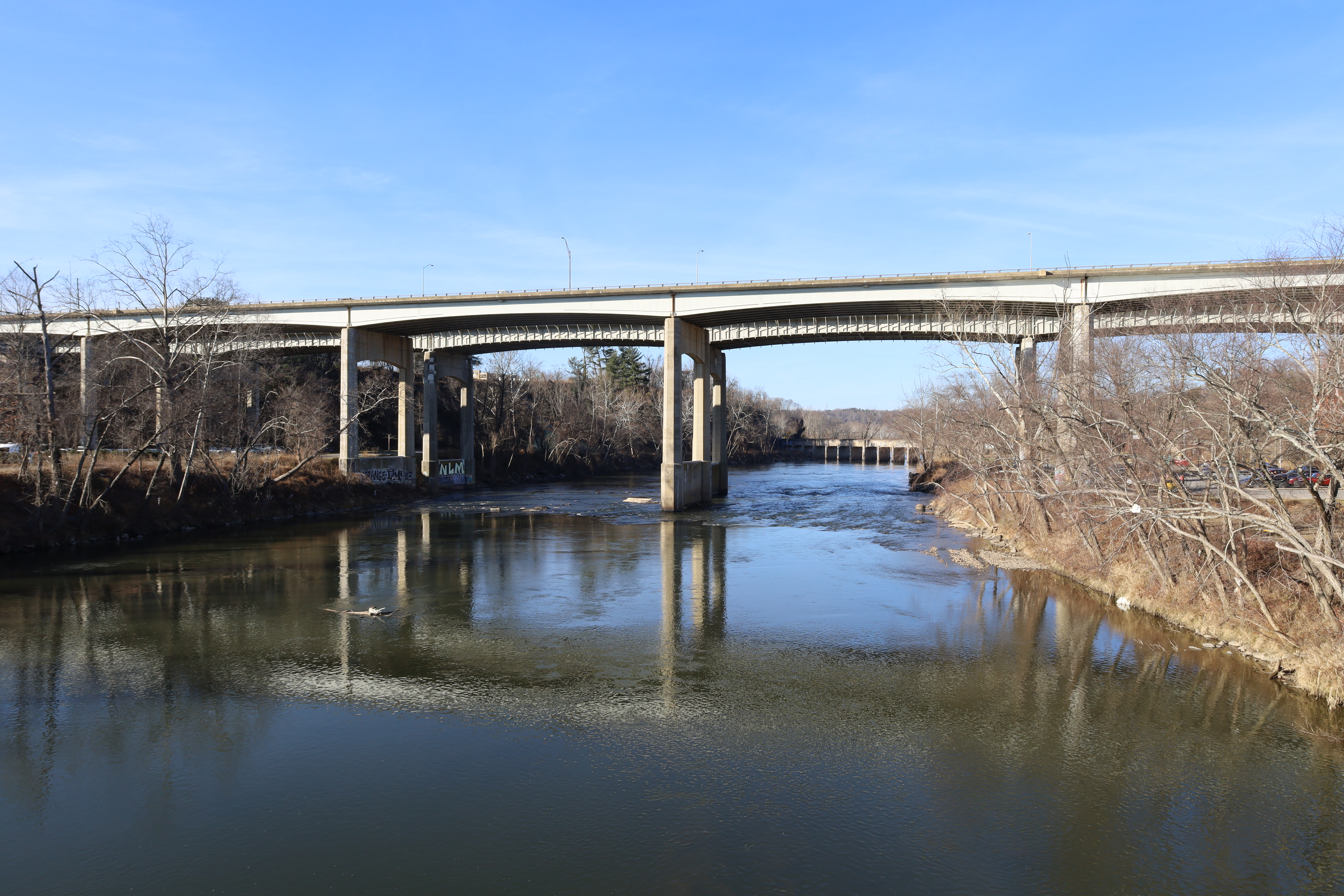
Interstates 26 and 240 cross the French Broad River over the Captain Jeff Bowen Bridge

I-240 begins at an interchange with I-26 and I-40 west of Asheville. I-240 and I-26 travel concurrently for four miles (6.4 km) along the western section of the routing. I-240 travels almost parallel to the French Broad River to its east. In the northwestern part of the route, US 19, US 23, and U.S. Highway 74 Alternate (US 74A) merge onto I-240 to cross the French Broad River. After crossing the river, I-26 proper ends and becomes Future I-26. Future I-26/US 19/US 23 exit off to the north and US 70 merges with I-240. The concurrent highways travel through the northern section of downtown Asheville. US 70/US 74A exits off I-240 at Charlotte Street. The Interstate continues through a cut in the mountain before turning back to the south. I-240 cross the Swannanoa River near Asheville Mall before terminating at an interchange with I-40 while the roadway continues on as US 74A, known locally as Charlotte Highway.

== History ==
In the early 1960s, the east–west freeway around downtown Asheville, designated US 19/US 23, opened from the Beaucatcher Tunnel westward to NC 191.

By 1966, Hanover Street had been converted to a freeway, which carried U.S. Highway 19 Business (US 19 Bus.)/US 23 Bus./NC 191; additional freeway was constructed from Haywood Road to I-40. In 1968, eastbound lanes were added to the Smoky Park Bridge, the main connector across the French Broad River. The original lanes, opened January 23, 1952, became westbound lanes.

The next step began with the 1964 presentation by J. O. "Buck" Buchanan to the NC Highway Commission Board. An Interstate Highway was to be built from the east to downtown Asheville to connect with the existing freeway. The best way to do this, it was concluded, was to blast an 800-foot-wide (240 m) passage through Beaucatcher Mountain. The Beaucatcher Mountain Defense Association, formed in the early 1970s, endorsed a tunnel, which would mean only about five percent of the mountain would be disturbed. In 1977, the North Carolina Department of Transportation (NCDOT) selected Asheville Contracting Co. for the project. Three million cubic feet (0.085×10^{6} m^{3}) of rock, including greywacke believed to be one billion years old, would have to be moved, and all of it could be used in the construction. The company had several connections to those responsible for the road plan: company president Baxter Taylor was a business partner of Ted Jordan, a highway board member and a member of the Chamber of Commerce Highway Committee; they founded Hyde Insurance Company, which sold $39.9 million (equivalent to $161 million in 2024) in bonds to finance the plan. And Buchanan went on to work in public relations for Asheville Contracting. One of the Defense Association's arguments was the highway's proximity to Zealandia, the estate of Philip Henry, whose Tudor mansion was covered by the 1966 National Historic Preservation Act. However, when the mansion was named to the National Register of Historic Places on March 14, 1977, the destruction of the mountain had started. The four-mile (6.4 km) project was completed October 31, 1980.

In 1971, NC 191 was extended along part of the unsigned freeway from Haywood Road to Brevard Road. On November 1, 1980, I-240 was officially established on the western half of the freeway from I-40 to Charlotte Street; NC 191 was rerouted north along Brevard Road to its current terminus at Haywood Road. By 1982, I-240 was extended through the Beaucatcher Cut onto new freeway east to I-40. In 1995, all of I-240 was named the Billy Graham Freeway.

In 1989, the North Carolina General Assembly approved a plan for urban loops around the state's major cities. Included in this plan was a bypass for Asheville, which included an "I-26 Connector" to link two sections of I-26, one ending south of Asheville, and the other north of the city designated "Future 26". For the controversial plan, $14.2 million (equivalent to $31.2 million in 2024) was spent, but, in 2010, the I-26 Connector was demoted to last among 21 urban loop projects. Improvements to I-240 were scheduled for 2020.

On April 5, 2012, the North Carolina Board of Transportation voted unanimously to rename the Smoky Park Bridge for Capt. Jeffrey Bowen, an Asheville firefighter who died in July 2011 fighting a fire. The board's policy traditionally prohibited naming state roads and bridges for firefighters, but numerous protests of the state's March decision led to the change. North Carolina Department of Transportation statistics show the eight-lane bridge to be the most traveled section of highway in Western North Carolina, with 99,000 vehicles a day.

== Future ==
A planned construction project, known as the I-26 Connector, is a project whose cost was estimated at $750 million in 2017 and $1.2 billion in 2023. to build the missing gap of I-26 through Asheville. Broken into three sections, they are all planned and funded in the 2016–2025 STIP. Section A, between Haywood Road and Brevard Road, will be a widening project with reconfiguration of ramps at Haywood, Amboy and Brevard. Section B, between north of Haywood Road to US 19/US 23/US 70, is the most expensive section of the project. After a review of various alternative designs, both state and federal agencies chose Alternative 4B, which will convert Patton Avenue along Bowen Bridges to local traffic and reroute I-240 along I-26 further north. Section C, the I-26/I-240/I-40 interchange, will be reconfigured to include missing ramp connects and a widening of I-40 through the area. The approximately seven-mile (11 km) project began right-of-way acquisition in 2019, with construction on all three sections in 2021. Additional plans for I-240 in west Asheville call for its expansion from four lanes to eight lanes.

As part of the I-26 Connector, in 2016, both state and federal agencies chose Alternative 4B, which will convert Patton Avenue along Bowen Bridge to local traffic and reroute I-240 along I-26 further north. In addition, the I-26/I-240/I-40 interchange, will be reconfigured to include missing ramp connects and a widening of I-40 through the area. The approximately seven-mile (11 km) project planned to begin right-of-way acquisition in 2019, though delays included state money and worries over how neighborhoods would be affected. The estimated cost increased from $750 million in 2017 to $1.2 billion in 2023.

The final contract for the main project, awarded to Archer–Wright Joint Venture, totalled $1.15 billion, the largest contract in the state's history. The design was selected May 15, 2024.

== Exit list ==
The entire route is in Asheville, Buncombe County.

| mi | km | Exit | Destinations | Notes |
|---|---|---|---|---|
| 0.0 | 0.0 | – | I-26 east / US 74 east – Hendersonville, Spartanburg | Continuation east; western end of Future I-26 concurrency |
| 0.0 | 0.0 | 31B | I-40 west / US 74 west – Canton, Knoxville | |
| 1.0 | 1.6 | 1B | NC 191 (Brevard Road) to I-40 east | |
| 1.4 | 2.3 | 1C | Amboy Road | Eastbound exit and westbound entrance |
| 2.0 | 3.2 | 2 | US 19 Bus. / US 23 Bus. south (Haywood Road) – West Asheville | Western end of US 19 Bus./US 23 Bus. concurrency |
| 3.0 | 4.8 | 3A | US 19 / US 23 south / US 74A west (Patton Avenue) / US 19 Bus. / US 23 Bus. ends | Eastern end of US 19 Bus./US 23 Bus. concurrency; western end of US 19/US 23/US 74A concurrency |
| 3.1 | 5.0 | 3B | Westgate / Resort Drive | Permanently closed August 2, 2026 |
| 3.7 | 6.0 | 4A | Future I-26 west / US 19 north / US 23 north / US 70 west – Weaverville, Woodfin, Johnson City | Eastern end of Future I-26/US 19/US 23 concurrency; western end of US 70 concurrency; to UNC Asheville |
| 3.8 | 6.1 | 4B | Patton Avenue – Downtown | Eastbound exit and westbound entrance |
| 4.3 | 6.9 | 4C | Montford Avenue / Haywood Street | |
| 4.8 | 7.7 | 5A | US 25 (Merrimon Avenue) | |
| 5.1 | 8.2 | 5B | US 70 east / US 74A east (Charlotte Street) to NC 694 | Eastern end of US 70/US 74A concurrency |
| 6.2 | 10.0 | 6 | Tunnel Road / Chunns Cove Road | |
| 7.0 | 11.3 | 7 | US 70 (Tunnel Road) | Three-level diamond interchange; to Asheville Mall |
| 8.5 | 13.7 | 8 | US 74A west (Fairview Road) to NC 81 | Western end of US 74A concurrency |
| 9.1 | 14.6 | 9 | I-40 – Statesville, Knoxville | |
| 9.1 | 14.6 | – | US 74A east (Charlotte Highway) – Bat Cave | Continuation east; eastern end of US 74A concurrency; to Blue Ridge Parkway |
1.000 mi = 1.609 km; 1.000 km = 0.621 mi: Closed/former; Concurrency terminus; Incomplete access

== See also ==
- Asheville metropolitan area
