= Rev. Joshua D. Jones House =

Historic house in North Carolina, United States

- U.S. National Register of Historic Places
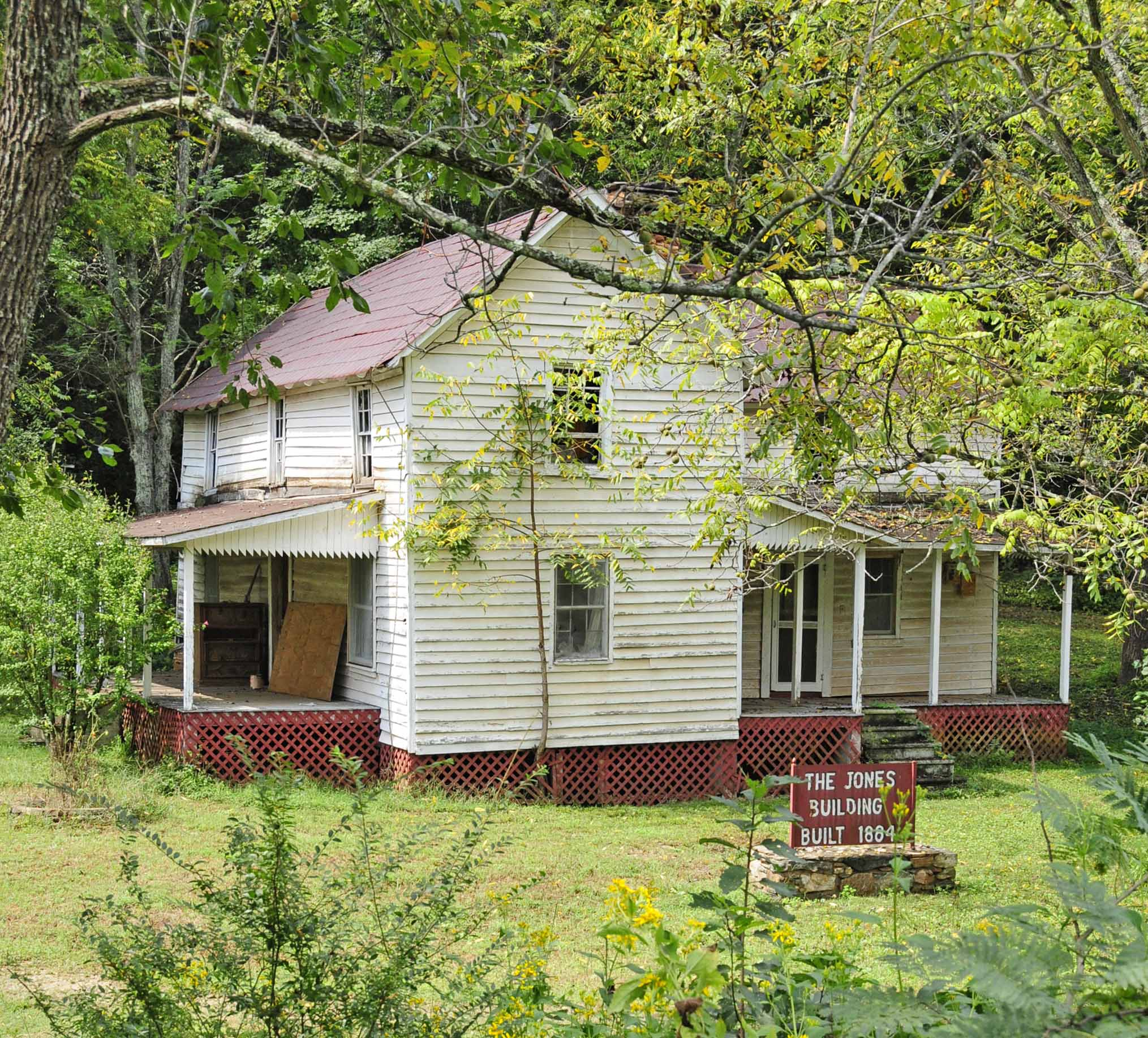
- Reverend Joshua D Jones House, September 2012

- Location within North Carolina Location within the United States
- Location: NC 1526 S side, 0.4 mi. from NC 108, Mill Spring, North Carolina
- Coordinates: 35°17′24″N 82°9′51″W
- Area: 2 acres (0.81 ha)
- Built: 1897
- Built by: Jones, Rev. Joshua D.
- Architectural style: Mid 19th Century Revival, I-house
- NRHP reference No.: 91001476
- Added to NRHP: September 26, 1991

Rev. Joshua D. Jones House is a historic home located at Mill Spring, Polk County, North Carolina. It was built in 1897, and is a two-story, three-bay, frame I-house with a two-story rear ell. A kitchen addition was built in 1925. It features a shed-roofed porch covering three-fourths of the lower facade. Also on the property is the contributing one-room, frame store building and well. It was the home of African-American community leader Rev. Joshua D. Jones of the Stony Knoll community.

It was added to the National Register of Historic Places in 1991.
