= Craven Gap =

Mountain pass in North Carolina

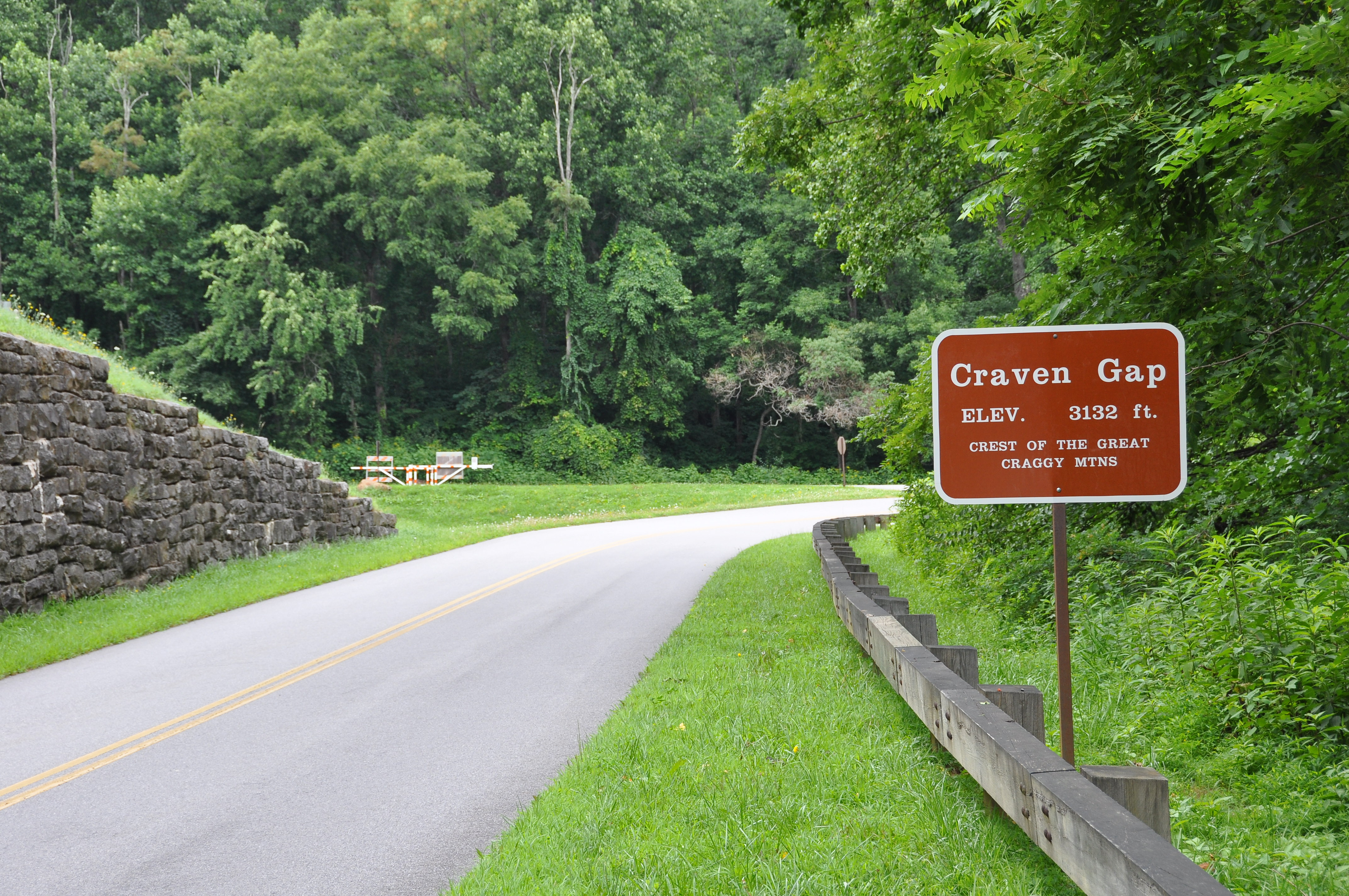
- Craven Gap, along the Blue Ridge Parkway

- Location within North Carolina
- Elevation: 3,132 feet (955 m)
- Traversed by: NC 694 / Blue Ridge Pkwy

Third Approach
- Location: North Carolina; United States
- Range: Great Craggy Mountains
- Coordinates: 35°38′52″N 82°29′27″W
- Topo map: USGS Craggy Pinnacle

Craven Gap (el. 3,132 ft (955 m)) is a mountain pass between Peach Knob and Rice Knob, part of the Elk Mountains and Great Craggy Mountains. NC 694 (Town Mountain Road) connects with the Blue Ridge Parkway at the gap, where it provides direct access to downtown Asheville. The gap also has trails for hikers and is a popular bicycle rest area.
