= Zealandia (Asheville, North Carolina) =

Historic house in North Carolina, United States

- U.S. National Register of Historic Places
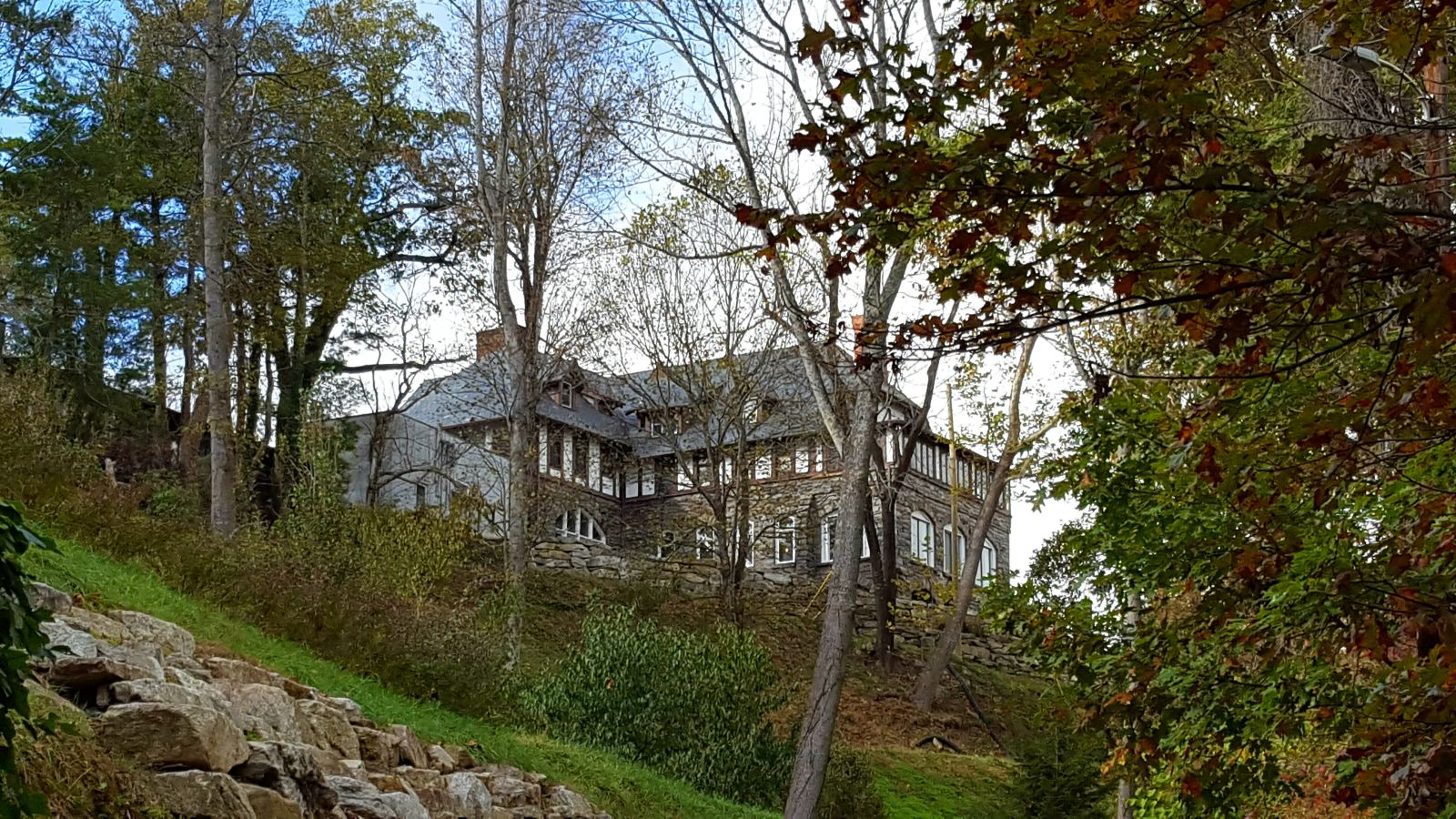

- Location within North Carolina Location within the United States
- Location: 1 Vance Gap Rd. Asheville, North Carolina
- Coordinates: 35°35′47″N 82°32′21″W
- Area: 12.7 acres (5.1 ha)
- Built: 1908
- Architectural style: Tudor Revival
- NRHP reference No.: 77000995
- Added to NRHP: March 14, 1977

Zealandia is an historic home located at Asheville, Buncombe County, North Carolina. It was built in 1908, and is a three-story, "T"-plan, Tudor Revival style dwelling. It features a three-story porte cochere, projecting masses, steep gables, heavy wrought iron entrance gates, and massive chimneys.

In 1884, after thirty years of fortune-making in New Zealand, John Evans Brown returned to Asheville to build his dream castle atop Beaucatcher Mountain. Brown called his castle Zealandia. Completed in 1889, Zealandia is a pebbledash-on-brick enclosure modeled after Haddon Hall in England. Six years later, John Evans Brown died. Zealandia was sold to O.D. Revell in 1901.

In 1904, Sir Phillip S. Henry, an Australian born diplomat acquired Zealandia. Under Sir Henry, Zealandia flourished. The castle doubled in size with a granite addition and was filled with ancient and sacred relics. In 1919, Sir Henry commissioned an artist to paint a mural in the style of the fifteenth century Italian painter, Benozzo Gozzoli. This mural, located in the old dining room, portrays family members and friends clad in classical robes, posing languidly with hounds, horses and flowers.

In 1930, Sir Henry opened a public museum on the grounds of Zealandia. An avid equestrian, Sir Henry also built an imposing Tudor-style stable for his horses. The stable was destroyed by fire in 1981. Zealandia passed to Violet Henry, Sir Henry's daughter, and her husband British General Hartley Maconochie.

After WWII, the Maconochie's attempts to sell Zealandia were futile. In 1950, portions of the original castle were dismantled for economic and safety reasons.

In 1976, the construction of Interstate 240 demolished part of Beaucatcher Mountain, including the structure that once housed the public museum. Despite fervid community protests and registration as a National Historic Place, the old museum fell.

Zealandia is not open to the public.
