= Beaucatcher Mountain =

Mountain in North Carolina, United States

- Location within North Carolina

Highest point
- Elevation: 2,694 ft (821 m)
- Coordinates: 35°36′19″N 82°32′17″W

Geography
- Location: Buncombe County, North Carolina, U.S.
- Parent range: Blue Ridge Mountains; Great Craggy Mountains
- Topo map: USGS Asheville

Beaucatcher Mountain is located in a portion of the Appalachian Mountain Range known as the Great Craggy Mountains, in Asheville, North Carolina. Its name was said to have been coined in the mid-1800s by James W. Patton, who once teased his sister-in-law, Charlotte Kerry, after watching her stroll the mountainside with her "beau". Patton suggested her eagerness to walk the mountain was incentive for her beau to spend time with her, thus, the mountain was dubbed Charlotte's “beau catcher.”

Beaucatcher Mountain's elevation reaches 2,694 feet (821 m), providing views of Downtown Asheville. The mountain borders the eastern part of downtown Asheville and has three main roads that tunnel through and go over the mountain. They are: US 70/US 74A via Beaucatcher Tunnel (completed in 1927), I-240 via Beaucatcher Cut (completed in 1980), and a Town Mountain Road (NC 694) which leads towards the Blue Ridge Parkway.

Beaucatcher Mountain originally had two reservoirs: White Fawn Reservoir (long ago decommissioned and filled in with construction debris) and Lake Kenilworth. The reservoirs provided drinking water to the city of Asheville beginning in the 1880s.

Waters from the mountain eventually make their way to the French Broad River.
