= Ruth, North Carolina =

- Town
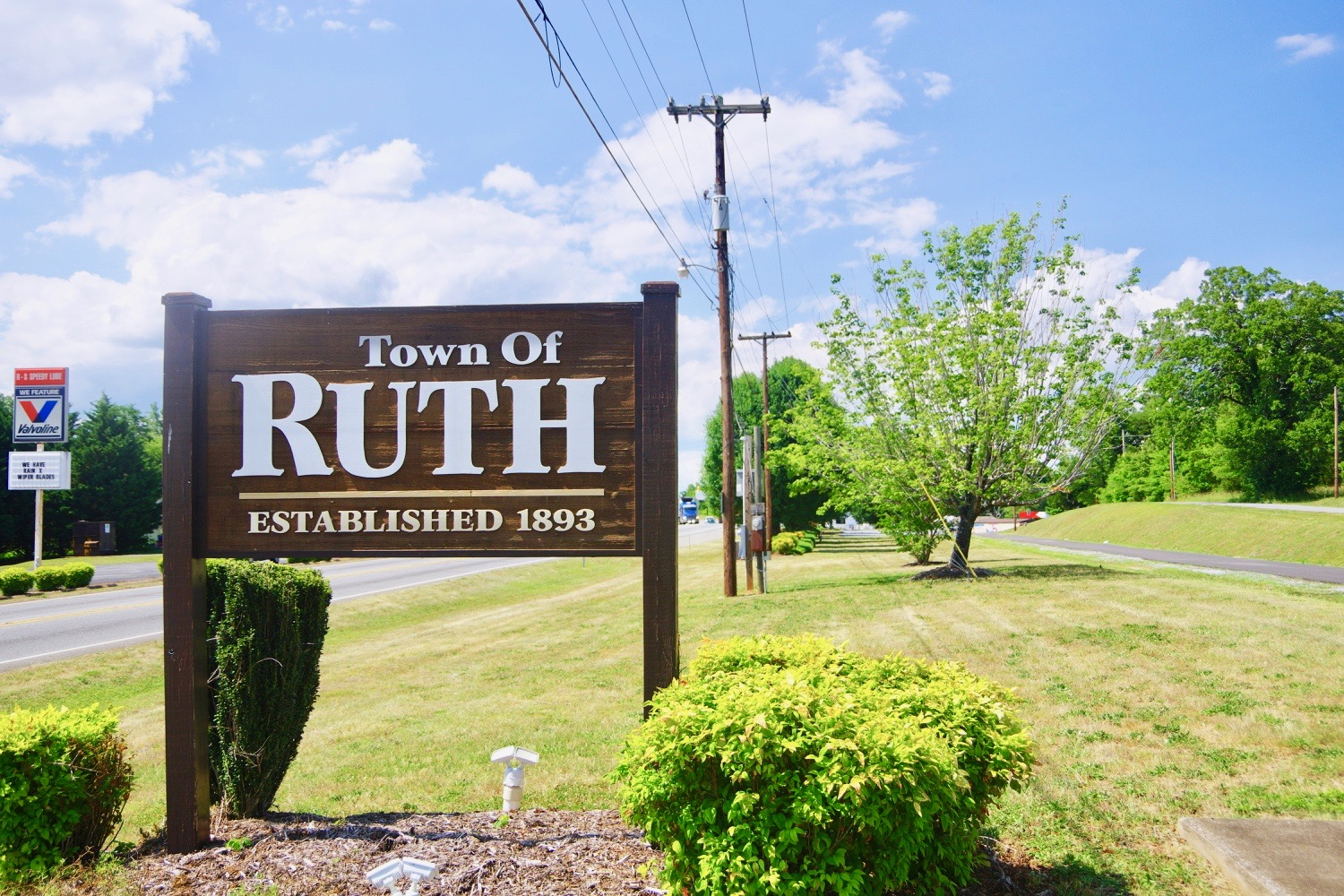
- Welcome sign

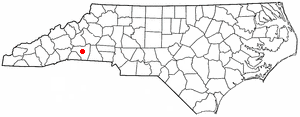
- Location of Ruth, North Carolina
- Coordinates: 35°22′57″N 81°56′41″W
- Country: United States
- State: North Carolina
- County: Rutherford

Government
  - Type: Local-democratically elected
  - Mayor: David Guy
  - Commissioners: William Steppe and Nick Goode

Area
  - Total: 0.42 sq mi (1.10 km^{2})
  - Land: 0.42 sq mi (1.10 km^{2})
  - Water: 0 sq mi (0.00 km^{2})
- Elevation: 968 ft (295 m)

Population (2020)
  - Total: 347
  - Density: 817.7/sq mi (315.71/km^{2})
- Time zone: UTC-5 (Eastern (EST))
  - Summer (DST): UTC-4 (EDT)
- ZIP code: 28139
- Area code: 828
- FIPS code: 37-58420
- GNIS feature ID: 2407259
- Website: https://www.townofruthnc.gov/

Ruth is a town in Rutherford County, North Carolina, United States. The population was 347 at the 2020 census.

== Geography ==
The town is concentrated around the intersection of the U.S. Route 64 and U.S. Route 74A. Ruth lies immediately northeast of Rutherfordton and northwest of Spindale.

According to the United States Census Bureau, the town has a total area of 0.4 square miles (1.0 km^{2}), all land.

== Demographics ==
Historical population
Census	Pop.	Note	%±
1910	205		—
1920	175		−14.6%
1930	297		69.7%
1940	318		7.1%
1950	324		1.9%
1960	529		63.3%
1970	360		−31.9%
1980	381		5.8%
1990	366		−3.9%
2000	329		−10.1%
2010	440		33.7%
2020	347		−21.1%
U.S. Decennial Census

As of the census of 2000, there were 329 people, 137 households, and 96 families residing in the town. The population density was 749.8 people per square mile (289.5 people/km^{2}). There were 155 housing units at an average density of 353.2 per square mile (136.4/km^{2}). The racial makeup of the town was 92.10% White, 6.38% Black or African American, 0.61% Native American, no Asian or Pacific Islander, 0.61% from other races, and 0.30% from two or more races. Hispanic or Latino of any race were 1.22% of the population.

There were 137 households, out of which 28.5% had children under the age of 18 living with them, 54.7% were married couples living together, 8.0% had a female householder with no husband present, and 29.2% were non-families. 27.0% of all households were made up of individuals, and 11.7% had someone living alone who was 65 years of age or older. The average household size was 2.40 and the average family size was 2.87.

In the town, the population was spread out, with 20.7% under the age of 18, 10.9% from 18 to 24, 28.3% from 25 to 44, 26.1% from 45 to 64, and 14.0% who were 65 years of age or older. The median age was 39 years. For every 100 females, there were 101.8 males. For every 100 females age 18 and over, there were 91.9 males.

The median income for a household in the town was $32,083, and the median income for a family was $41,500. Males had a median income of $25,688 versus $20,250 for females. The per capita income for the town was $16,402. About 5.8% of families and 7.2% of the population were below the poverty line, including 3.2% of those under age 18 and 14.3% of those age 65 or over.
