= Beaucatcher Tunnel =

Tunnel in Asheville, North Carolina, United States

- Interactive map of Beaucatcher Tunnel

Overview
- Location: Asheville, North Carolina
- Coordinates: 35°35′54.3″N 82°32′18.5″W
- Route: US 70 / US 74A

Operation
- Opened: 1929

Technical
- Length: 750 feet (230 m)
- No. of lanes: 2

Beaucatcher Tunnel carries U.S. Route 70 (US 70) and US 74A through Beaucatcher Mountain in Asheville, North Carolina. Work on the 750-foot (230 m) tunnel was started in 1927 and completed in 1929. The tunnel has two lanes and sidewalks separated from the traffic lanes by concrete barriers. It was renovated in 2014 with new stone portals.

The Asheville Times reported the cost of the joint city-county project as nearly $400,000, with several delays and even cave-ins during construction. Many called the tunnel "folly and a reckless waste", and Democrats who had supported it were voted out in 1928. One reason for the opposition was that there was essentially nothing on the tunnel's east side. Two decades later, increased development east of the tunnel made it worthwhile. However, traffic increased to five times what the tunnel was designed for by 1960, and the tunnel was harder to maintain. Asheville Mall made the situation even worse, and traffic slowed greatly in both directions.

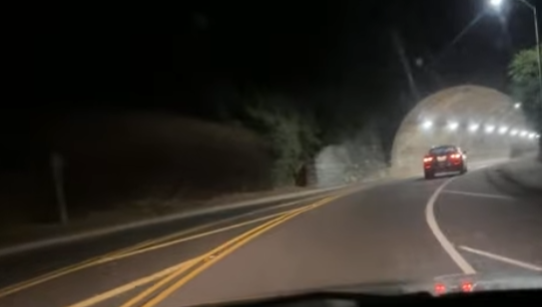
The west portal of the tunnel

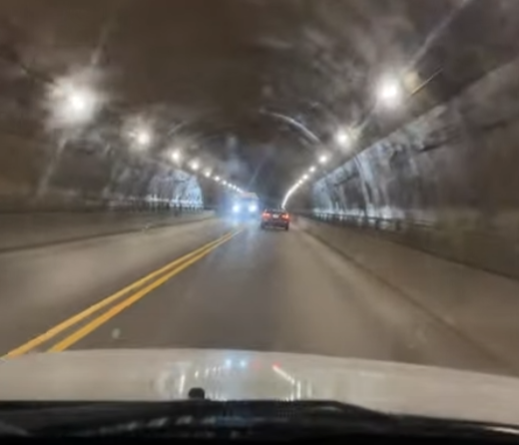
Inside the tunnel, headed east

For the construction of Interstate 240 on a parallel alignment two new tunnels were considered for the interstate route. In 1967 the North Carolina State Highway Commission endorsed an open cut through the mountain, which was projected to save $11.4 million over tunnel construction. The four-mile project was completed October 31, 1980 and cost $48 million.
