= North Carolina Highway 694 =

State highway in Buncombe County, North Carolina, US

North Carolina Highway 694
- Town Mountain Road

Route information
- Maintained by NCDOT
- Length: 6.3 mi (10.1 km)
- Existed: 1932–present

Major junctions
- South end: US 70 / US 74A in Asheville
- North end: Blue Ridge Parkway (milepost 377)

Location
- Country: United States
- State: North Carolina
- Counties: Buncombe

Highway system
- North Carolina Highway System; Interstate; US; State; Scenic
← NC 690	→ NC 700

North Carolina Highway 694 (NC 694) is a primary state highway in the U.S. state of North Carolina. This scenic highway serves as connector between Asheville and the Blue Ridge Parkway (BRP).

== Route description ==
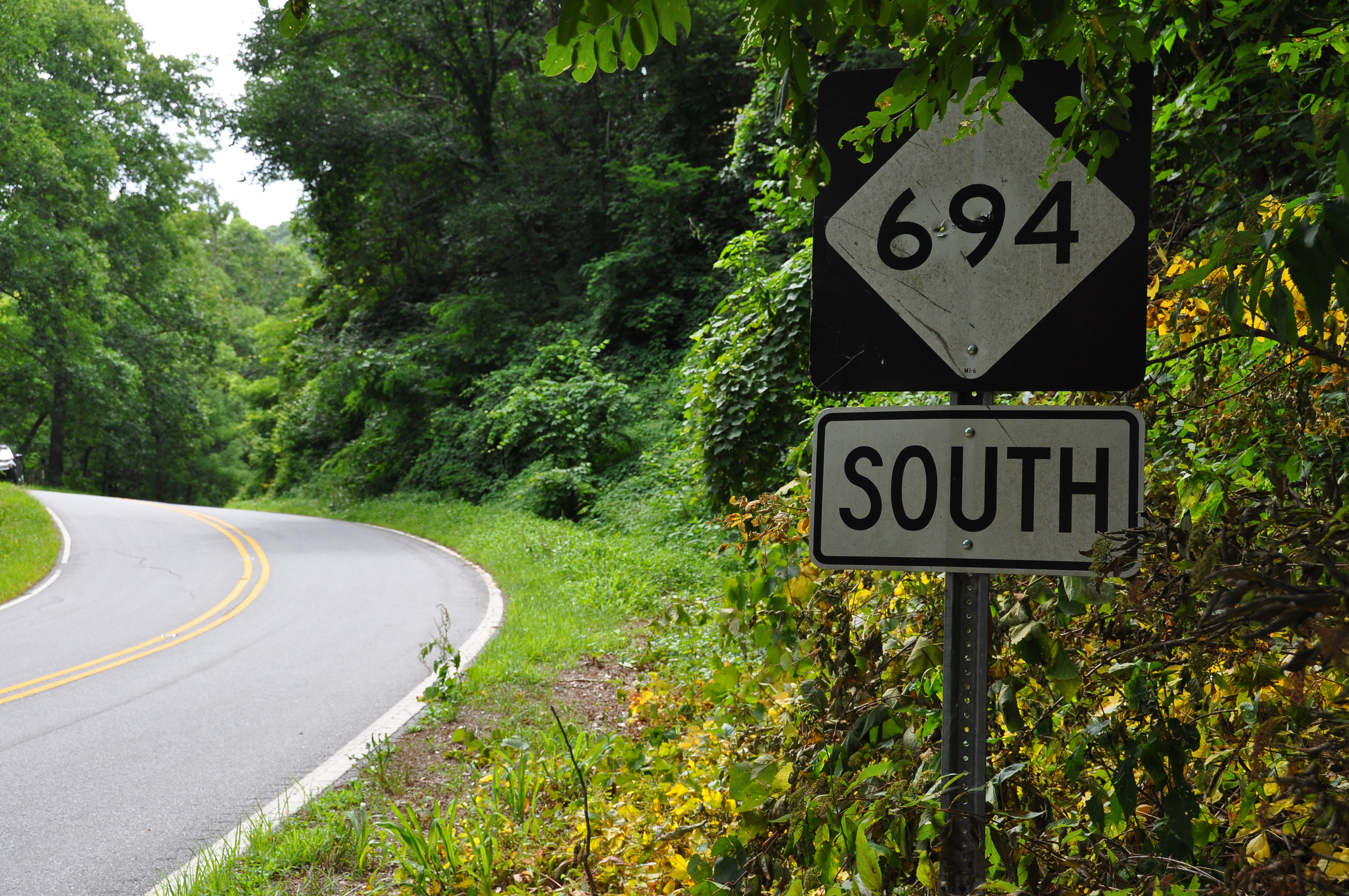
NC 694 South (2011-07-16).

NC 694 is a 6.3-mile (10.1 km) two-lane scenic highway begins in downtown Asheville. Going northeast from its southern terminus at Martin Luther King Jr. Drive and College Street (the latter of which also carries U.S. Route 70 (US 70) and US 74A), it passes over Interstate 240 as it quickly ascends Beaucatcher Mountain, eventually to the ridge line. From there it curves along the east-side of Sunset Mountain and Patton Mountain, then on the south-side of Rich Knob and Meadows Mountain, before going around the southeast side of Peach Knob. It meets-up with the Blue Ridge Parkway at Craven Gap where it ends. The overall road is curvy, but manageable after the initial climb. There are no signage at the intersection with the Blue Ridge Parkway that indicates it as NC 694; visitors along the BRP will need to look for it at Craven Gap, near milepost 377 (607 km).

== History ==
Established in 1932 as a new primary scenic route, NC 694 started at Poplar Street (US 70/US 74), going north on Oak Street then east on Woodfin Street, then north on Charlotte Street to Edwin Place, then northwest to Kimberly Avenue, continuing north. It then used Grifting Boulevard east to Patton Mountain Road, where it stayed until it reached Town Mountain Road. Continuing northeast, Town Mountain Road continues on what will later become part of the Blue Ridge Parkway. It then turns west onto Elk Mountain Scenic Highway, following all the way back to Beaverdam Road, where it ends on Merrimon Avenue (US 19/US 23/US 25/US 70/NC 20). By the early 1940s, NC 694 was rerouted to go from Woodfin Street onto Town Mountain Road.

Around 1954, NC 694 was truncated to Woodfin Street, due to a realignment of US 70. In 1961, it went back on Woodfin Street, to end at Market Street (US 19 Business/US 23 Business), due to another realignment of US 70 which put it onto a new expressway. By around 1980, NC 694 was truncated east at the Blue Ridge Parkway, dropping the Elk Mountain Scenic Highway into obscurity. Between 1981 and 1982, NC 694 was truncated west to its current location of Town Mountain Road at College Street; due to another realignment of US 70 along Charlotte Street to College Street.

Originally, NC 694 was established in 1922, connecting Cranberry to Elk Park and then into Tennessee. This route was later replaced by NC 194 and US 19 in the mid-1920s.

== Junction list ==
The entire route is in Buncombe County.

Location	mi	km	Destinations	Notes
Asheville	0.0	0.0	US 70 / US 74A (College Street)	
	6.3	10.1	Blue Ridge Parkway	
1.000 mi = 1.609 km; 1.000 km = 0.621 mi
