= Great Craggy Mountains =

Mountain range in North Carolina, United States

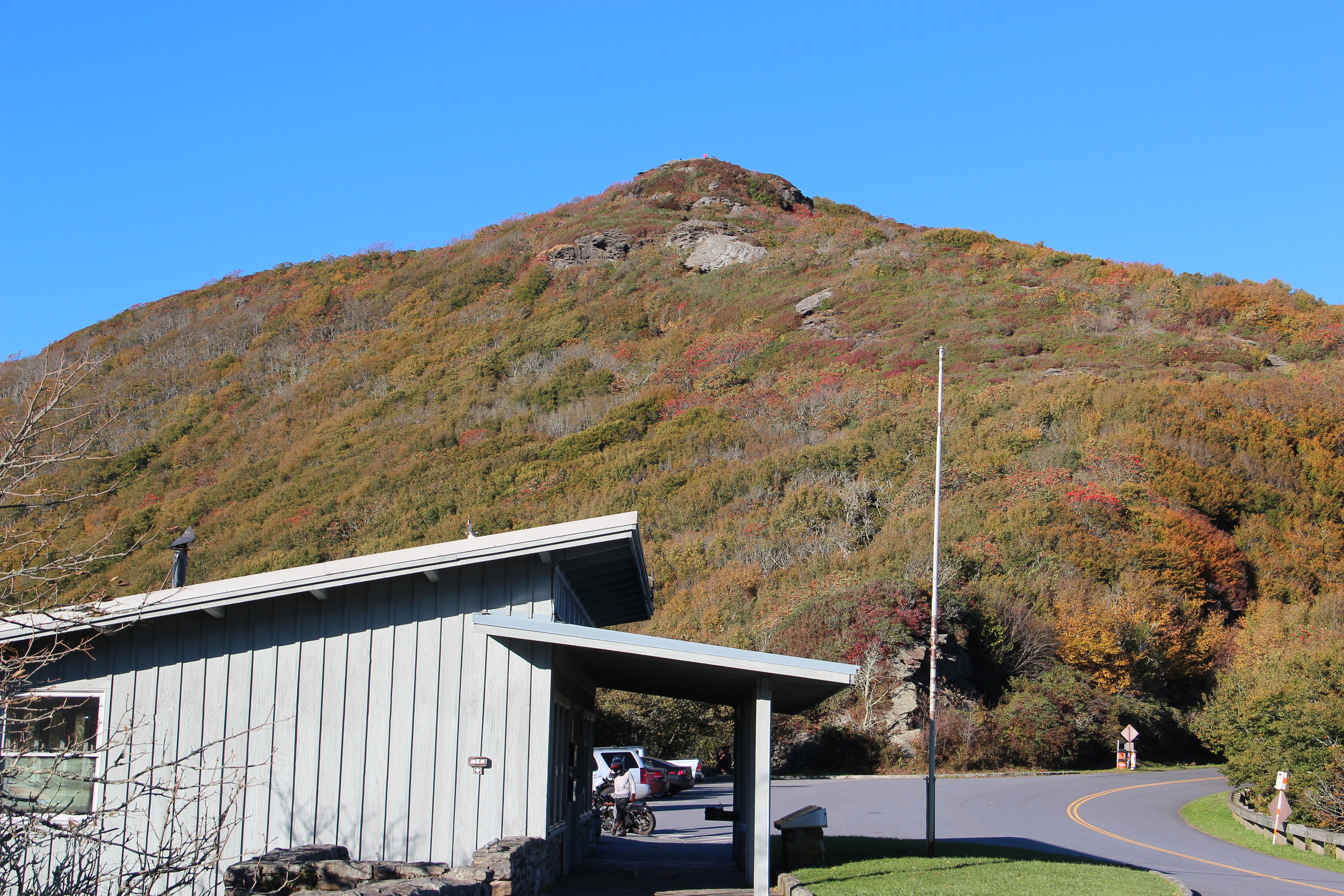
- Craggy Pinnacle, viewed from the Craggy Gardens Visitor Center

Highest point
- Peak: Craggy Dome
- Elevation: 6,105 ft (1,861 m)
- Coordinates: 35°42′21″N 82°22′0″W

Geography
- Country: United States
- State: North Carolina
- Range coordinates: 35°42′N 82°23′W
- Parent range: Blue Ridge Mountains
- Borders on: Black Mountains

Geology
- Orogeny: Alleghenian

The Great Craggy Mountains, commonly called the Craggies, are a mountain range in western North Carolina, United States. They are a subrange of the Blue Ridge Mountains and encompass an area of approx. 194 sq mi (503 km²). They are situated in Buncombe County, North Carolina, 14 miles northeast of Asheville. The Black Mountains lie to the northeast, across the upper Cane River valley.

The Blue Ridge Parkway runs along the crest for most of the way between Asheville and Mount Mitchell. Craggy Gardens, an area of 16 km, is covered with purple Catawba rhododendrons in mid-June. The Craggy Pinnacle Overlook trail is a moderate .73 mile hike to a stone wall overlook with 360 degree views. The parking area for the trail is at milepost 361.2 on the Blue Ridge Parkway.

The parkway through the area was closed from late 2012 through early 2013 due to subsidence caused by heavy rains, and had to be closed again during summer 2013 due to a reoccurrence of the same issues. Access to Mount Mitchell was only from the north or via detour from the south.

== Habitat ==
The high slopes of the Great Craggies are dominated by heath bald with rhododendron and blueberry, and northern hardwood forest with beech, buckeye, mountain ash, and red oak. The Craggies are in the Pisgah National Forest.

== Peaks ==
The highest point in the Great Craggy Mountains is Craggy Dome, which rises to an elevation of 6,105 feet (1,861 m).

Peak Name	Elevation	Prominence	Coordinates	Easiest route
Craggy Dome	6,105 feet (1,861 m)	1,000 feet (305 m)	35°42′21″N 82°22′00″W	Hike
Bullhead Mountain	5,899 feet (1,798 m)	320 feet (98 m)	35°42′59″N 82°21′29″W	Hike
Craggy Pinnacle	5,817 feet (1,773 m)	233 feet (71 m)	35°42′12″N 82°22′40″W	Trail
Craggy Gardens	5,525 feet (1,684 m)	160 feet (49 m)	35°41′33″N 82°23′05″W	Trail
Locust Knob	5,429 feet (1,655 m)		35°43′41″N 82°21′02″W	Hike
Snowball Mountain	5,341 feet (1,628 m)	440 feet (134 m)	35°42′07″N 82°24′26″W	Trail
Bearpen Knob	5,266 feet (1,605 m)	48 feet (15 m)	35°41′58″N 82°23′38″W	Hike
Lane Pinnacle	5,194 feet (1,583 m)	590 feet (180 m)	35°40′52″N 82°25′18″W	Hike
Little Snowball Mountain	4,692 feet (1,430 m)	320 feet (98 m)	35°43′12″N 82°25′50″W	Trail
Frosty Knob	4,236 feet (1,291 m)	1,126 feet (343 m)	35°44′31″N 82°28′45″W	Hike
Beaucatcher Mountain	2,694 feet (821 m)		35°36′19″N 82°32′17″W	Auto Road

== See also ==
- List of mountains in North Carolina

== Sources ==
- "Great Craggy Mountains". Peakbagger.com.
- Great Craggy Mountains description
