= North Carolina Highway 81 =

State highway in Buncombe County, North Carolina, US

North Carolina Highway 81
- Swannanoa River Road

Route information
- Maintained by NCDOT
- Length: 4.2 mi (6.8 km)
- Existed: 1934–present

Major junctions
- West end: US 25 in Asheville
- US 25A in Asheville; US 74A in Asheville
- East end: US 70 in Asheville

Location
- Country: United States
- State: North Carolina
- Counties: Buncombe

Highway system
- North Carolina Highway System; Interstate; US; State; Scenic
← NC 80	→ NC 82

North Carolina Highway 81 (NC 81) is a primary state highway in the U.S. state of North Carolina that runs entirely in Asheville and Buncombe County from US 25 to US 70.

== Route Description ==
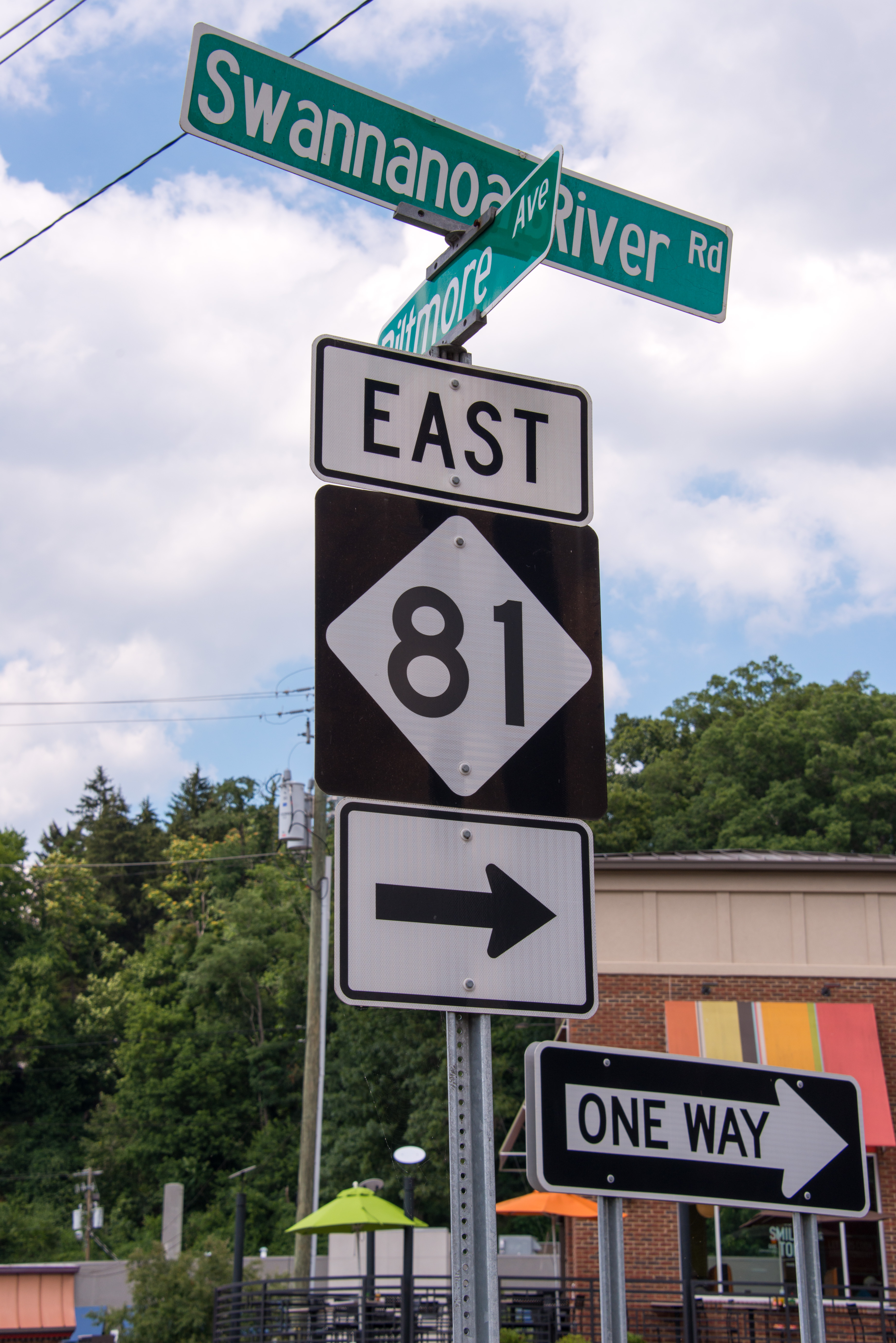
Biltmore at Swannanoa

NC 81 begins at the intersection of All Souls Crescent (US 25 north), Hendersonville Road (US 25 south), and Vanderbilt Road in Historic Biltmore Village. It runs northward via Hendersonville Road for 0.3 miles (0.48 km), intersecting US 25A (Lodge Street) along the way. Immediately after crossing the Swannanoa River, it turns eastward on Swannanoa River Road, which closely tracks the path of the Swannanoa River. Westbound lanes of NC 81, however, are routed for 0.1 miles (0.16 km) via Bryson Street, which intersects Biltmore Avenue one block north of Swannanoa River Road. After 1.6 miles (2.6 km) NC 81 intersects US 74A (South Tunnel Road) near the Asheville Mall. It runs concurrent with US 74A for 1.2 miles (1.9 km) before US 74A turns southward onto Fairview Road. NC 81 continues to follow the Swannanoa River for another 1.1 miles (1.8 km) and then turns to the northward, ultimately terminating at US 70 (Tunnel Road) in Asheville's Oteen neighborhood.

== History ==
NC 81 was designated in 1934 as a renumbering of NC 10 from US 25 (current Biltmore Avenue) to US 70/US 74 (current US 74A). The road was then extended in 1937 when US 25 was rerouted in Asheville. NC 81 was placed south along Biltmore Avenue to the current end of the road at the intersection of US 25 and US 25A. Then in 1938 the road was extended to its current terminus at US 70.

== Major intersections ==
The entire route is in Asheville, Buncombe County.

mi	km	Destinations	Notes
0.0	0.0	US 25 (Hendersonville Road / All Souls Crescent)	
0.2	0.32	US 25A (Lodge Street)	
1.9	3.1	US 74A west (South Tunnel Road)	Western end of US 74A concurrency
3.1	5.0	US 74A east (Fairview Road) – Lake Lure, Rutherfordton, Charlotte	Eastern end of US 74A concurrency
4.2	6.8	US 70 (Tunnel Road)	
1.000 mi = 1.609 km; 1.000 km = 0.621 mi: Concurrency terminus
