= Gerton, North Carolina =

- Census-designated place
- Gerton's Upper Hickory Nut Gorge Community Center, destroyed in Hurricane Helene in 2024 and to be rebuilt in 2027.

- Location within North Carolina Location within the United States
- Coordinates: 35°28′33″N 82°21′01″W
- Country: United States
- State: North Carolina
- County: Henderson County
- Named for: Gertrude Freeman

Area
  - Total: 3.72 sq mi (9.63 km^{2})
  - Land: 3.72 sq mi (9.63 km^{2})
  - Water: 0 sq mi (0.00 km^{2})
- Elevation: 2,782 ft (848 m)

Population (2020)
  - Total: 290
  - Density: 78/sq mi (30.1/km^{2})
- Time zone: UTC-5 (Eastern (EST))
  - Summer (DST): UTC-4 (EDT)
- ZIP code: 28735
- Area code: 828
- GNIS feature ID: 2628627
- FIPS code: 37-25900

Gerton is an unincorporated community and census-designated place (CDP) in Henderson County, North Carolina, United States. As of the 2020 census, Gerton had a population of 290. It is part of the Asheville Metropolitan Statistical Area.

== History ==
The area was first connected by a Drovers' road, a natural access into the interior of the Blue Ridge Mountains for drovers who were moving livestock, mostly flocks of turkeys and some geese, herds of hogs and some cattle in and out of the mountains to the markets. Established in 1798, it connected the area with Asheville, following on what is today U.S. Route 74A (US 74A). In 1883 the "Pump" Post Office was opened, named after a pump that supplied water off Bearwallow Mountain to the community in the valley. In 1902, the United States Post Office issued a new cancelling stamp for the post office, but had misspelled Pump as Rump. The residents, being both upset and embarrassed, decided to rename the community after a long-time and beloved school teacher in the community, Gertrude Freeman. However, having been known to be very shy and modest, it was decided to use a contraction of her name instead, Gerton.

== Geography ==
The community is located along Gerton Highway (US 74A), 19.7 miles (31.7 km) northeast of Hendersonville, along the banks of Hickory Creek, part of the Broad River watershed. It is 17 miles (27 km) southeast of Asheville via US 74A.

Just northeast of the town is the Florence Nature preserve, containing several miles of hiking trails, and connecting to other trails surrounding the town.

According to the U.S. Census Bureau, the Gerton CDP has an area of 3.8 square miles (9.8 km^{2}), all land.

== Demographics ==
Historical population
Census	Pop.	Note	%±
2020	290		—
U.S. Decennial Census

== Services ==
Fire protection is provided by Gerton Fire and Rescue, which has a class 4 DOI rating.
