= Mill Spring, North Carolina =

- Unincorporated community
- Location within North Carolina Location within the United States
- Coordinates: 35°17′51″N 82°09′40″W
- Country: United States
- State: North Carolina
- County: Polk
- Elevation: 1,001 ft (305 m)
- Time zone: UTC-5 (Eastern (EST))
  - Summer (DST): UTC-4 (EDT)
- ZIP code: 28756
- Area code: 828
- GNIS feature ID: 1021460

Mill Spring is an unincorporated community in Polk County, North Carolina, United States. Mill Spring is located at the junction of North Carolina Highway 9 and North Carolina Highway 108 3.7 miles (6.0 km) northeast of Columbus, North Carolina. Mill Spring has a post office with ZIP code 28756. Mill Spring is named after Colonel Ambrose Mills. He founded a saw mill and post office in the community.

Mill Spring was the hometown of Bryant H. Womack, recipient of the Medal of Honor for actions during the Korean War.

The Rev. Joshua D. Jones House was added to the National Register of Historic Places in 1991.

The Tryon International Equestrian Center, in Mill Spring, was the location of the 2018 FEI World Equestrian Games.

== See also ==
- Lake Adger, northwest of town
