= Chimney Rock, North Carolina =

Town in North Carolina, United States

- Village
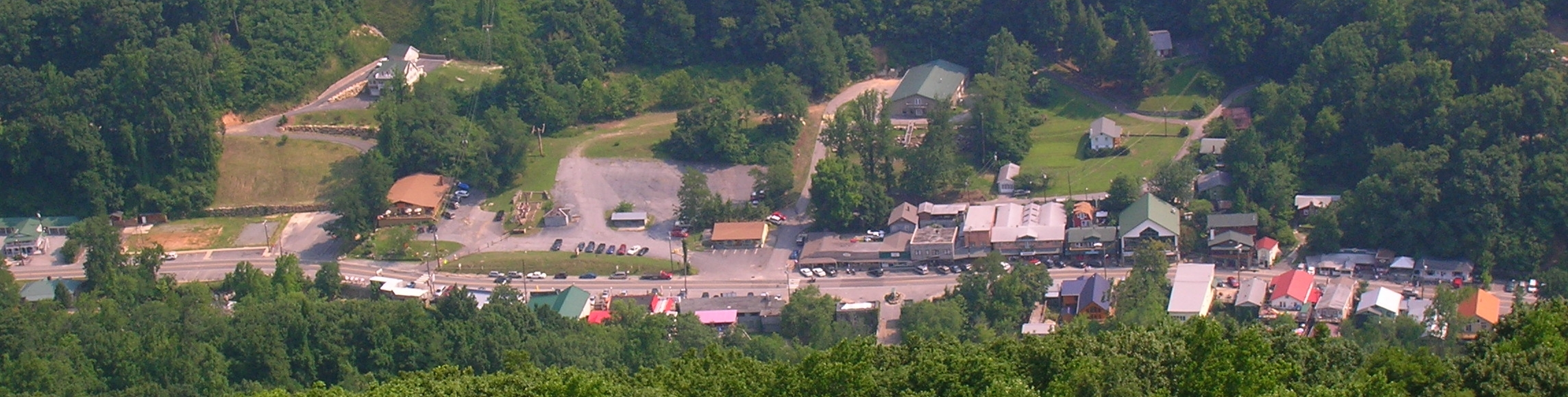
- Village of Chimney Rock (2006)

- Location within North Carolina Location within the United States
- Coordinates: 35°26′21.43″N 82°14′47.41″W
- Country: United States
- State: North Carolina
- County: Rutherford
- Named for: Chimney Rock

Area
  - Total: 3.36 sq mi (8.70 km^{2})
  - Land: 3.36 sq mi (8.69 km^{2})
  - Water: 0.0039 sq mi (0.01 km^{2})
- Elevation: 1,093 ft (333 m)

Population (2020)
  - Total: 140
  - Density: 42/sq mi (16/km^{2})
- Time zone: UTC-5 (Eastern (EST))
  - Summer (DST): UTC-4 (EDT)
- ZIP code: 28720
- Area code: 828
- FIPS code: 37-12460
- GNIS ID: 1027392
- Website: https://www.chimneyrockvillagenc.gov/

Chimney Rock is a village in Rutherford County, North Carolina, United States. The population was 140 at the 2020 census. The village took its name from a large gneiss outcrop located on a summit above the village itself in Chimney Rock State Park.

== History ==
A U.S. post office for Chimney Rock existed since at least 1843.

On September 27, 2024, the majority of Chimney Rock was substantially damaged by flooding caused by Hurricane Helene, with the Broad River inundating the village. The flooding also heavily damaged the adjoining town of Lake Lure.

== Geography ==
According to the United States Census Bureau, the village has a total area of 2.8 square miles (7.3 km^{2}), all land. The town shares a border with the town of Lake Lure. The villages of Chimney Rock and Bat Cave along with parts of Chimney Rock State Park lie within Hickory Nut Gorge. It is an incised, narrow, and relatively linear gorge likely eroded by the Broad River preferentially along either a zone of highly fractured metamorphic rock associated with a regional fault or other linear geologic feature.

== Geology ==
Geological mapping by Hadley and Nelson and Robinson and others found that the Henderson Gneiss underlies the mountains, hills, and valley in the region of Chimney Rock and parts of adjacent Chimney Rock State Park. The Henderson Gneiss is a medium- to coarse-grained, generally well-foliated, biotite-microcline augen gneiss. It is finer grained and more foliated adjacent to the Brevard Fault zone and becomes coarser and less foliated towards the southeast. Where radiometrically dated, the Henderson Gneiss yielded an Rb-Sr whole-rock age of 535+27 Ma and U-Pb zircon ages of 592 and 538 Ma. Near Bat Cave, North Carolina, a couple of (Triassic ?) diorite dikes have been mapped cutting through the Henderson Gneiss west of Chimney Rock. The Henderson Gneiss lacks any cross-cutting pegmatite dikes and associated economic mineral deposits in the region of Chimney Rock and Bat Cave. The closest pegematite dikes, which lack any observed, commercial mineral deposits, occur in biotite-muscovite granitic gneiss forming the upper part of Sugarloaf Mountain.

The Chimney Rock - Hickory Nut Gorge area is part of a block of crust known now as the Tugaloo terrane. This piece of crust was a microcontinent that collided and accreted to North America during the Cambrian and early Ordovician periods. It was at this time that massive amounts of granodiorites, including the precursor plutonic rocks to the Henderson Gneiss, intruded into metasedimentary rocks at approximately 448 Ma. During this and later times, the rocks of the Tugaloo terrane experienced multiple periods intense folding, faulting, and metamorphism. Between 390 and 340 Ma, the granodiorites were altered by a period of intense metamorphism and thrust faulting to form the Henderson Gneiss and the gently dipping northeast-southwest trending foliation and folding associated with it.

During the post-Paleozoic, stresses caused by the uplift, erosion, and decompression of the Henderson Gneiss fractured it into orthogonal, sub-vertical joints. The timing of formation of these joints is poorly constrained. They typically occur as west-northwest - east-southeast and north-northeast - south-southwest systematic set of joints. These joint sets lie parallel and perpendicular to the Hickory Nut Gorge and define the rectilinear drainage networks. Because of a regional humid climate and steep gorge walls composed of systematically jointed and fractured bedrock, Hickory Nut Gorge has a long record of historical landslide events. These events include those in 1916, 1994, 1996, 2008, 2012, 2013, and 2018 as documented in the North Carolina Geological Survey's Western North Carolina Landslide Hazard Viewer. The presence of extensive rock boulder and block deposits at the base the gorge's wall show that debris flows and rock falls have been active along the steep gorge walls throughout the Quaternary.

== Government ==
Chimney Rock Village is governed by a five-member council. Council members serve four-year staggered terms. They are elected at large in non-partisan contests determined by plurality, with the person receiving the highest number of votes elected to the open seats. The council selects a mayor from among its members after each of its own elections. The village retains an administrator and a staff responsible to the council to carry out governmental functions.

== Demographics ==
Historical population
Census	Pop.	Note	%±
2000	175		—
2010	113		−35.4%
2020	140		23.9%
U.S. Decennial Census

=== 2020 census ===
As of the 2020 United States census, there were 140 people, 81 households, and 48 families residing in the village.

Chimney Rock racial composition
Race	Number	Percentage
White (Germanic)	126	90.00%
Pacific Islander	1	0.71%
Other/Mixed	9	6.43%
Hispanic or Latino	4	2.86%

=== 2000 census ===
As of the census of 2000, there were 175 people, 74 households, and 51 families residing in the village. The population density was 63.3 inhabitants per square mile (24.4/km^{2}). There were 200 housing units at an average density of 72.3 per square mile (27.9/km^{2}). The racial makeup of the village was 94.86% White, 0.57% Native American, 2.29% from other races, and 2.29% from two or more races. Hispanic or Latino of any race were 4.00% of the population.

There were 74 households, out of which 25.7% had children under the age of 18 living with them, 58.1% were married couples living together, 5.4% had a female householder with no husband present, and 31.1% were non-families. 21.6% of all households were made up of individuals, and 8.1% had someone living alone who was 65 years of age or older. The average household size was 2.36 and the average family size was 2.80.

In the village, the population was spread out, with 21.7% under the age of 18, 6.3% from 18 to 24, 30.3% from 25 to 44, 25.7% from 45 to 64, and 16.0% who were 65 years of age or older. The median age was 39 years. For every 100 females, there were 118.8 males. For every 100 females age 18 and over, there were 110.8 males.

The median income for a household in the village was $29,583, and the median income for a family was $29,583. Males had a median income of $28,250 versus $22,813 for females. The per capita income for the village was $17,142. About 15.8% of families and 14.7% of the population were below the poverty line, including 11.1% of those under the age of eighteen and 20.0% of those 65 or over.

== Gallery ==
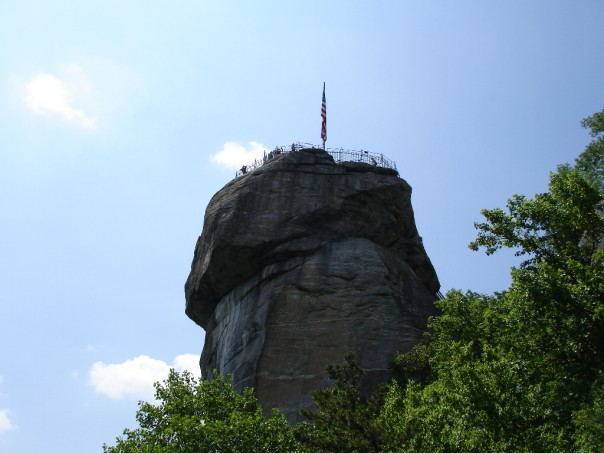
Chimney Rock, a 315-foot (96 m) gneiss monolith in Chimney Rock State Park near the village (2006)

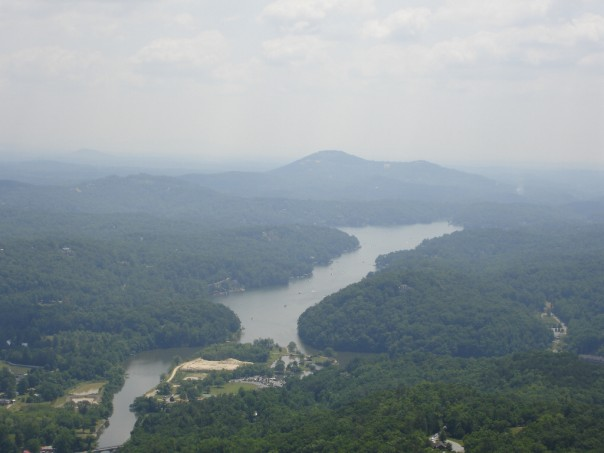
View from the top of Chimney Rock (2011)
