= List of lakes of Pennsylvania =

List of lakes and reservoirs in Pennsylvania

This is a list of lakes, reservoirs, ponds, and other inland bodies of water in the state of Pennsylvania in the United States. According to the Pennsylvania Fish and Boat Commission, Pennsylvania contains over 450 naturally formed and artificial lakes used for recreation, flood control, municipal water supply, hydroelectric generation, conservation, mining reclamation, and wildlife habitat.

Most naturally formed lakes in Pennsylvania are concentrated in the glaciated northwestern and northeastern portions of the state, while many of the state's larger lakes are man-made reservoirs created during the 19th and 20th centuries.

== Naturally-Formed Lakes ==
Naturally formed lakes in Pennsylvania are relatively uncommon compared to artificial reservoirs. Many were formed by glacial activity during the last Ice Age. The following are lakes in Pennsylvania confirmed to be formed naturally.

- Canadohta Lake
- Conneaut Lake
- Edinboro Lake*
- Harveys Lake
- Lake Carey
- Lake LeBoeuf
- Lake Pleasant (Erie County, PA)
- Lake Silkworth
- Shumans Lake
- Sugar Lake
- Edinboro Lake was enlarged by engineers.

== Man-Made Lakes ==
- Acme Dam
- Allegheny Reservoir (also known as Kinzua Lake)
- Angelica Lake
- Antietam Lake
- Antietam Reservoir
- Arrowhead Lake
- Aylesworth Creek Lake
- Bakerton Reservoir
- Barmore Lake
- Baylors Lake
- Bear Creek Lake
- Bear Gap Reservoir
- Bear Lake
- Bearwallow Pond
- Beaver Creek Pd 1
- Beaver Creek Pd 11
- Beaver Creek Pd 12
- Beaver Creek Pd 14
- Beaver Creek Pd 2
- Beaver Creek Pd 3
- Beaver Creek Pd 4
- Beaver Creek Pd 5
- Beaver Creek Pd 7
- Beaver Creek Pd 8
- Beaver Creek Pd 9
- Beaver Lake
- Beaver Meadows Lake
- Beaver Run Reservoir
- Beaver Run Shallow Water Impoundment
- Beaverdale Reservoir
- Beaverdam Run Reservoir
- Beech Lake
- Beechwood Lake
- Belmont Lake
- Beltzville Lake
- Bentleyville Reservoir
- Bessemer Lake
- Black Hole Pond
- Black Moshannon Lake
- Blacks Lake
- Blue Marsh Lake
- Blue Marsh Reservoir
- Bob Kosts Pond
- Bonin Lake
- Boyertown Reservoir
- Bradford City Number Five Reservoir
- Bradford City Number Three Reservoir
- Bradford City Number Two Reservoir
- Bradford Reservoir
- Bradys Lake
- Bradys Run Lake
- Brandy Springs Park Pond
- Briar Creek Lake
- Briar Creek Reservoir
- Bridgeport Reservoir
- Brownell Reservoir
- Bruce Lake
- Buhl Lake
- Butler Hunting And Fishing Club Lake
- Buzzard Swamp No 1
- Buzzard Swamp No 10
- Buzzard Swamp No 11
- Buzzard Swamp No 12
- Buzzard Swamp No 13
- Buzzard Swamp No 14
- Buzzard Swamp No 15
- Buzzard Swamp No 3
- Buzzard Swamp No 4
- Buzzard Swamp No 5
- Buzzard Swamp No 6
- Buzzard Swamp No 7
- Buzzard Swamp No 8
- Buzzard Swamp No 9
- Camp Mountain Run Scout Pond
- Camp Sherwin Pond
- Canoe Creek Lake
- Canonsburg Lake
- Carbaugh Reservoir
- Carnegie Lake
- Carsonia Lake
- Cascade Quarry
- Chambers Lake
- Chapman Dam Reservoir
- Chapman Lake
- Chester Octoraro Reservoir
- Childrens Lake
- Church School Farm Park Lake
- Churchville Reservoir
- City Reservoir
- Clear Lake
- Clearview Reservoir
- Clearwater Lake
- Cloe Lake
- Coatesville Reservoir
- Cold Stream Dam
- Colver Reservoir
- Colyer Lake
- Comfort Lake
- Comminds Pond
- Concourse Lake
- Conemaugh River Lake
- Conneaut Lake
- Cooks Pond
- Cowanesque Lake
- Cowans Gap Lake
- Cranberry Glade Lake
- Crevelling 2
- Crevelling 3
- Crooked Creek Lake
- Cross Creek Lake
- Crystal Lake
- Cummings Reservoir
- Curwensville Lake
- Curtis Reservoir
- Deep Creek Dam
- Deer Lake
- Desandis Pond
- Diamond Lake
- Donegal Lake
- Dora Pond
- Doubling Gap Lake
- Dubois Reservoir
- Duck Harbor Pond
- Duke Lake
- Duman Dam
- Duman Lake
- Dunlap Creek Lake
- Dunmore Reservoir 1
- Dutch Fork Lake
- East Bangor Lake
- East Basin Pond
- East Branch Clarion River Lake
- Eaton Reservoir
- Egypt Meadow Lake
- Eldridge Lake
- Elmhurst Reservoir
- Elton Sportsmen's Dam
- Erie Nwr Pool K
- Erie Nwr Pool Number Nine
- Fairview Gravel Pits
- Fairview Lake
- Falls Township Park Lake
- Faylor Lake
- FDR Park Lake
- Filbert Pond
- Fogelsville Quarry North
- Fords Lake
- Foster Joseph Sayers Lake
- Foster Joseph Sayers Reservoir
- Frances Slocum Lake
- Francis E Walter Reservoir
- Fuller Lake
- Gallitzin Sportsmen's Dam
- Gallitzin State Forest Pond 1
- Gallitzin State Forest Pond 2
- Gallitzin State Forest Pond 3
- Gallitzin State Forest Pond 4
- Gallitzin State Forest Pond 5
- Gallitzin State Forest Pond 6
- Gallitzin State Forest Pond 7
- Gallitzin State Forest Pond 8
- Gallitzin State Forest Pond 9
- Garvick Pond
- George B Stevenson Reservoir
- Girard Borough Park Pond
- Glade Dam Lake
- Glade Lake
- Glade Run Lake
- Glatco Lake
- Glendale Lake
- Gordon Lake
- Goss Run Dam
- Gouldsboro Lake
- Green Lake
- Green Lane Reservoir
- Green Lick Reservoir
- Greenwood Lake
- Griffin Reservoir
- Halfway Lake
- Hamilton Lake
- Hamlin Lake
- Hammond Lake
- Hanover Dam
- Harbar Acres Lake
- Harris Pond
- Heart Lake
- Hereford Manor Lakes
- Hickory Run Lake
- Hidden Lake
- High Point Lake
- Highland Lake
- Hills Creek Lake
- Hinckston Run Reservoir
- Hirtzels Pond
- Holman Lake
- Hollidaysburg Reservoir
- Hollister Reservoir
- Hopewell Lake
- Hopewell Township Park Pond
- Howard Eaton Reservoir
- Humboldt Reservoir
- Hunsicker's Pond
- Hunters Lake
- Indian Creek Reservoir
- Indian Lake
- Ingham Springs Dam
- Janesville Dam
- Juniata Lake
- Justus Lake
- Kaercher Creek Dam
- Kaercher Creek Lake
- Kahle Lake
- Keller Reservoir
- Kelsey Creek Lake
- Kettle Creek Lake
- Kettle Creek Reservoir
- Keystone Lake
- Keystone Lake (Armstrong County)
- Keystone Lake (State Park)
- Keystone Lake (Westmoreland County)
- Kingswood Lake
- Kinzua Lake
- Kinzua Pumped Storage Reservoir
- Kleinhans Lake
- Kleinheintz Memorial Pond
- Klines Reservoir
- Koenigs Creek Dam
- Koon Lake
- Kooser Lake
- Kyle Lake
- Lackawanna Lake
- Lake Aldred
- Lake Arthur
- Lake Augusta
- Lake Bresci
- Lake Canadohta
- Lake Carobeth
- Lake Chillisquaque
- Lake Clarke
- Lake Emilie
- Lake Erie
- Lake Frances
- Lake Galena
- Lake Giles
- Lake Gordon
- Lake Greeley
- Lake Grubb
- Lake Irena
- Lake Jamie
- Lake Jean
- Lake John
- Lake Koon
- Lake Latenny
- Lake Latonka
- Lake Loch Lomond
- Lake Lorain
- Lake Louise
- Lake Lucy
- Lake Luxembourg
- Lake Manjo
- Lake Marburg
- Lake Muhlenberg
- Lake Nadine
- Lake Nephawin
- Lake Nessmuk
- Lake Nockamixon
- Lake of the Meadows
- Lake Ondawa
- Lake Oneida
- Lake Ontelaunee
- Lake Perez
- Lake Pleasant
- Lake Redman
- Lake Rowena
- Lake Scranton
- Lake Sheridan
- Lake Took A While
- Lake Towhee
- Lake Wallenpaupack
- Lake Warren Dam
- Lake Wesauking
- Lake Wilhelm
- Lake Williams
- Lake Wilma
- Lake Winola
- Lakemont Reservoir
- Lakeside Quarry
- Landis Lake
- Laurel Creek Reservoir
- Laurel Hill Lake
- Laurel Lake
- Laurel Run Reservoir
- League Island Lake
- Leaser Lake
- Lebanon Reservoir
- Leboeuf Lake
- LeBoeuf Lake
- Leisure Lakes
- Letterkenny Reservoir
- Levittown Lake
- Lily Lake
- Lily Pond
- Linesville Sportsman Pond
- Lions Lake
- Little Beaverdam Creek Rgc Pond
- Little Buffalo Lake
- Little Mud Pond
- Little Pine Lake
- Little Pine Lake
- Loch Alsh Reservoir
- Locust Lake
- Long Arm Dam
- Long Arm Reservoir
- Long Pine Run Reservoir
- Long Pond
- Lower Burrel Park Pond
- Lower Deer Lake
- Lower Hunt's Spring Pond
- Lower Lake
- Lower Woods Pond
- Loyalhanna Lake
- Lyman Run Lake
- Lyman Run Reservoir
- Lynchwood Lake
- Magnolia Lake
- Mahoning Creek Lake
- Main Lake
- Mammoth Dam
- Maple Lake
- Marquette Lake
- Marsh Creek Lake
- Marshall Lake
- Mauch Chunk Lake
- Mcdade Park Lake
- McDonald Sportsmen Club Pond
- Mcwilliams Reservoir
- Meade Run Pd 30
- Meade Run Pd 31
- Meade Run Pd 32
- Meadow Grounds Lake
- Memorial Lake
- Meredian Dam
- Merli-Sarnoski Park Lake
- Middle Creek Reservoir
- Middle Creek Wildlife Management Area Reservoir
- Middle Deer Lake
- Middletown Reservoir
- Mill Creek Reservoir
- Mill Run Reservoir
- Miller Pond
- Minsi Lake
- Mitchell Lake
- Montour Preserve Pond
- Moon Lake
- Mountain Lake
- Mountain Springs Lake
- Mud Lake
- Mud Pond
- Muddy Run Recreation Lake
- Myerstown Borough Pond
- Negro Mountain Pond
- Neifert Creek Dam
- Nesbitt Reservoir
- Nessmuk Lake
- Newton Lake
- Nixon Park Pond Number One
- Nixon Park Pond Number Two
- Nockamixon Lake
- North Fork Reservoir
- North Lake
- North Park Lake
- Northmoreland Lake
- Number 2 Reservoir
- Number 3 Reservoir
- Number 5 Reservoir
- Ontelaunee Lake
- Opossum Lake
- Orrtanna Pond
- Owl Creek Reservoir
- Oxbow Lake
- Pa 799 Reservoir
- Page Lake
- Panther Hollow Lake
- Parker Lake
- Pecks Pond
- Peec Lake
- Penn Forest Reservoir
- Penn Hills Park Pond
- Penn Township Municipal Park Pond
- Perry Lake
- Peters Twp. Lake
- Pickerel Lake
- Pikes Creek Reservoir
- Pinchot Lake
- Pine Cradle Lake
- Pine Crest Lake
- Pine Rn Reservoir
- Pine Township Park Pond
- Piney Reservoir
- Pocono Lake
- Pocono Summit Lake
- Poe Lake
- Pond Behind Jerome Townhouse
- Presque Isle Bay
- Promised Land Lake
- Prompton Dam
- Prompton Lake
- Pumping Station Dam
- Pymatuning Reservoir
- Pymatuning Sanctuary
- Quaker Lake
- Quemahoning Reservoir
- Rabbit Run Reservoir
- Raccoon Creek State Park Upper Pond
- Raccoon Lake
- Ransberry Pond
- Raystown Lake
- Remaley Pond
- Rexmont Dam Number One
- Rexmont Dam Number Two
- Ridgway Reservoir
- Ridley Park Lake
- Roaring Rn Nat Area Pd
- Rose Valley Lake
- Ross Township Community Pond
- Round Hill Park Pond
- Saint Vincent Lake
- Sand Spring Lake
- Sandy Lake
- Scotts Run Lake
- Seven Mountains Boy Scout Pond
- SGL No 63 Pd No 1
- SGL No 63 Pd No 2
- SGL No 63 Pd No 3
- SGL No 63 Pd No 4
- SGL No 63 Pd No 5
- SGL No 63 Pd No 6
- Shaggers Inn Pond
- Shawnee Lake
- Shenango River Lake
- Sheppard-myers Reservoir
- Shohola Marsh Reservoir
- Silver Lake
- Sinoquipe Lake
- Smith Reservoir
- Smoky Run Rgc Pond
- Snow Hill Dam
- Somerset Lake
- Somerset Municipal Authority Laurel Hill Ck Res
- Sones Pond
- Speedwell Forge Lake
- Splashdam Pond
- Sprankles Pond
- Spring Brook Intake Dam
- Springton Reservoir
- Starlight Lake
- Stellfox Pond
- Stephen Foster Lake
- Stevens Lake
- Stillwater Lake
- Stony Run Pond
- Stovers Lake
- Stoyers Dam
- Straight Run Lake
- Strawberry Lake
- Struble Lake
- Stump Pond
- Sunfish Pond
- Sunny Hill Lake
- Susquehanna Lake
- Sweet Arrow Lake
- Sylvan Lake
- Tamarack Lake
- The Giving Pond
- Thorn Reservoir
- Tingley Lake
- Tioga-Hammond Lakes
- Tioga Reservoir
- Tionesta Lake
- Tobyhanna Lake
- Trout Lake
- Trout Run Reservoir
- Troy Reservoir
- Tunnel Road Pd
- Tuscarora Lake
- Twin Lakes
- Twin Lakes Number One Reservoir
- Twin Lakes Number Two Reservoir
- Two Lick Reservoir
- Two Mile Run Reservoir
- Union City Reservoir
- Unity Township Pond
- Up E Church St Dam
- Upper Deer Lake
- Upper Gravel Pit
- Upper Ice Pond
- Upper Woods Pond
- Virgin Run Lake
- Walker Lake
- Wards Ranch Pond
- Washington Crossing Dam
- Watres Reservoir
- Waynesboro Reservoir
- Waynewood Lake
- West Basin Pond
- Whipoorwill Dam
- Whipple Dam Lake
- Whipple Lake
- White Deer Lake
- White Oak Pond
- Whitesell Dam
- Wild Creek Reservoir
- Wild Fowl Pond
- Wilmore Dam
- Wisecarver Reservoir
- Woodcock Creek Lake
- Wynooska Lake
- Yellow Creek Lake
- Yosets Lake
- Youghiogheny River Lake
- Zerbe Run Rod & Gun Club Pond

== See also ==
- List of rivers of Pennsylvania
