= Swale Brook =

River in Wyoming County, Pennsylvania

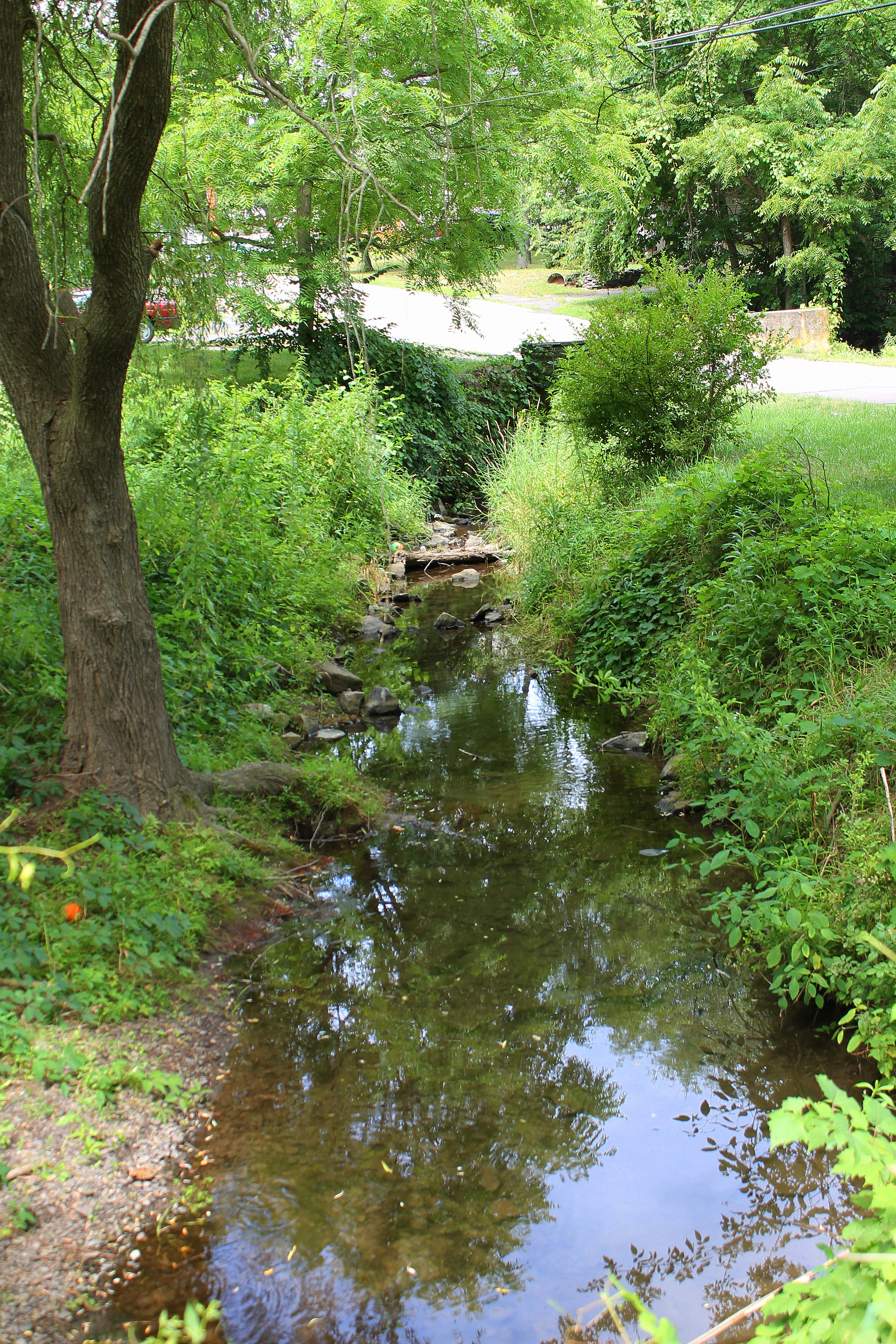
- Swale Brook in Tunkhannock

Physical characteristics
- Source
  - location: Cruver Pond in Tunkhannock Township, Wyoming County, Pennsylvania
  - elevation: between 1,040 and 1,060 feet (317 and 323 m)
- Mouth
  - location: Tunkhannock Creek in Tunkhannock, Wyoming County, Pennsylvania
  - coordinates: 41°32′15″N 75°56′10″W
  - elevation: 607 ft (185 m)
- Length: 2.9 mi (4.7 km)
- Basin size: 4.01 sq mi (10.4 km^{2})

Basin features
- Progression: Tunkhannock Creek → Susquehanna River → Chesapeake Bay
- Tributaries
  - left: one unnamed tributary
  - right: one unnamed tributary

Swale Brook is a tributary of Tunkhannock Creek in Wyoming County, Pennsylvania, in the United States. It is approximately 2.9 miles (4.7 km) long and flows through Tunkhannock Township and Tunkhannock. The watershed of the stream has an area of 4.01 square miles (10.4 km^{2}). The stream is not designated as an impaired waterbody. The surficial geology near it consists of alluvium, alluvial terrace, Wisconsinan Outwash, Wisconsinan Till, Wisconsinan Ice-Contact Stratified Drift, fill, and a wetland.

There are several road crossings and a railroad bridge crossing over Swale Brook. A number of industries also historically operated near the stream. The stream's watershed is designated as a Coldwater Fishery and a Migratory Fishery and the stream itself has a high level of fish diversity.

== Course ==
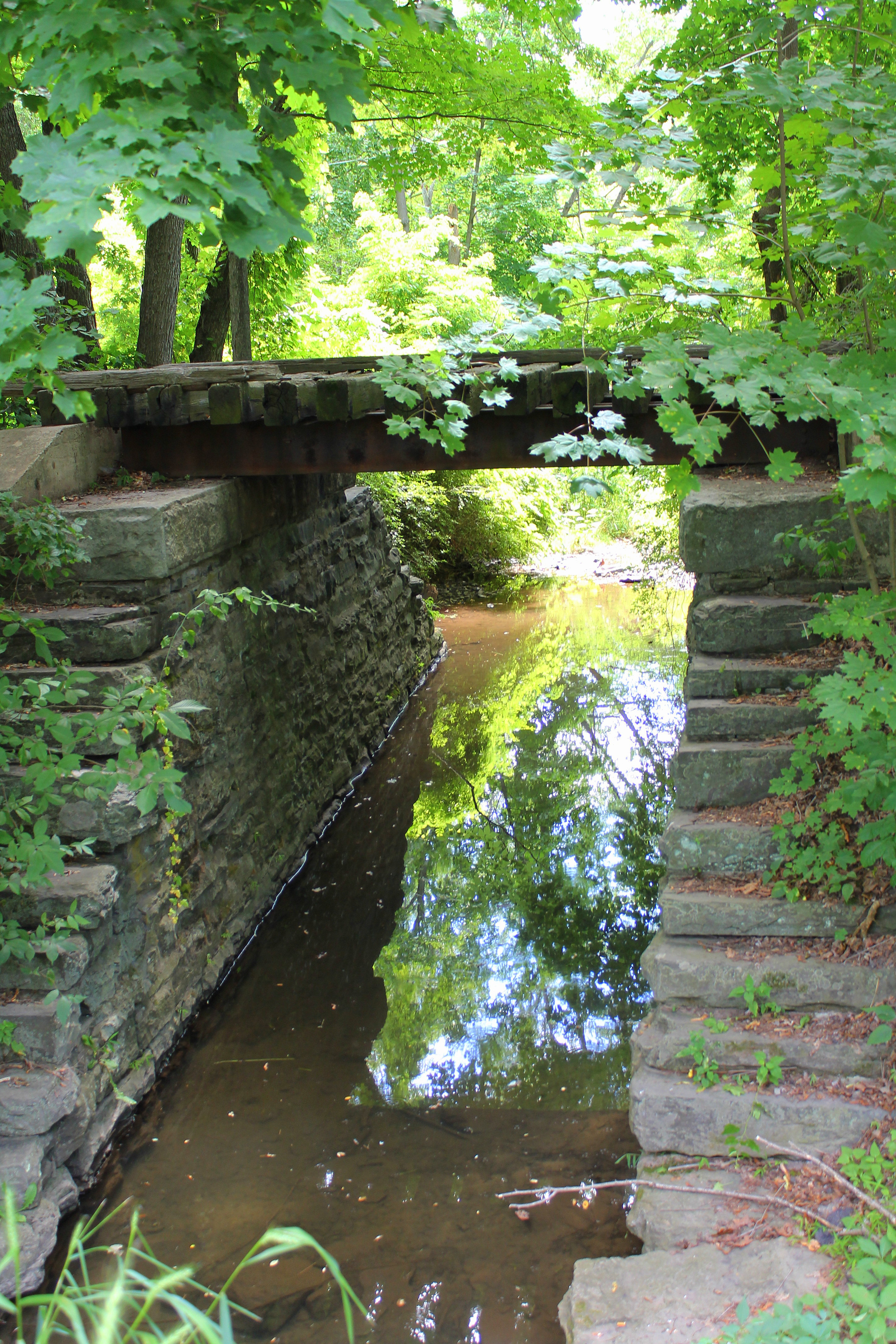
Swale Brook in Tunkhannock

Swale Brook begins in Cruver Pond in Tunkhannock Township. It flows mostly south-southwest for a few tenths of a mile before receiving an unnamed tributary from the right. After several tenths of a mile, the stream turns east-southeast for more than a mile, entering Tunkhannock and receiving an unnamed tributary from the left. It then crosses Pennsylvania Route 29 and then turns south-southeast. A short distance further downstream, the stream crosses US Route 6 and reaches its confluence with Tunkhannock Creek.

Swale Brook joins Tunkhannock Creek 0.64 miles (1.03 km) upstream of its mouth.

== Hydrology ==
Swale Brook is not designated as an impaired waterbody. The Tunkhannock Area School District once applied for and/or received a permit to discharge stormwater into the stream during construction activities.

Swale Brook was once described as a stream of "pure, cold water".

== Geography and geology ==
The elevation near the mouth of Swale Brook is 607 feet (185 m) above sea level. The elevation of the stream's source is between 1,040 and 1,060 feet (317 and 323 m) above sea level. The stream has been described as "small enough to step across".

The surficial geology in the vicinity of the lower and middle reaches of Swale Brook consists of alluvium, Wisconsinan Outwash, Wisconsinan Ice-Contact Stratified Drift, and alluvial terrace. In the upper reaches, the surficial geology near the stream consists of a till known as Wisconsinan Till.

== Watershed ==
The watershed of Swale Brook has an area of 4.01 square miles (10.4 km^{2}). The stream is entirely within the United States Geological Survey quadrangle of Tunkhannock. Its mouth is located at Tunkhannock.

A pond known as Cruver Pond is located at the headwaters of Swale Brook. There are several road crossings along the stream's course. Additionally, the stream crosses a railroad bridge.

== History ==
Swale Brook was entered into the Geographic Names Information System on August 2, 1979. Its identifier in the Geographic Names Information System is 1189122. The stream is also known as Quaker Swamp Brook. This variant name appears in Israel C. White's 1883 book The geology of the North Branch Susquehanna River Region in the six counties of Wyoming, Lackawanna, Luzerne, Columbia, Montour and Northumberland.

By the middle of the 19th century, a tannery had been built on Swale Brook. By 1888, a mill had been constructed on the stream in Tunkhannock. It produced wooden butter pails and tubs, shingles, and cider. In 1902, wood from a covered bridge damaged by flooding was processed at the mill.

A steam-powered electric plant operated in the vicinity of Swale Brook until 1903. Shortly before 1906, a canning factory on the stream closed; in that year the Pennsylvania Witch Hazel Company opened at the site. Swale Brook was impacted by flooding during Hurricane Agnes in 1972. It also experienced flooding in 2011. The Federal Emergency Management Agency once purchased some homes along the stream as part of a buyout program.

== Biology ==
The drainage basin of Swale Brook is designated as a Coldwater Fishery and a Migratory Fishery. The stream has a very high level of fish diversity and has been described as "packed with fish diversity". At least ten fish species of fish have been observed in the stream, including eastern blacknose dace, common shiners, yellow bullheads, and the rare brook stickleback.

The riparian buffer of Swale Brook is densely vegetated in some reaches.

== See also ==
- Billings Mill Brook, next tributary of Tunkhannock Creek going upstream
- List of rivers of Pennsylvania
