= Kern Glen Creek =

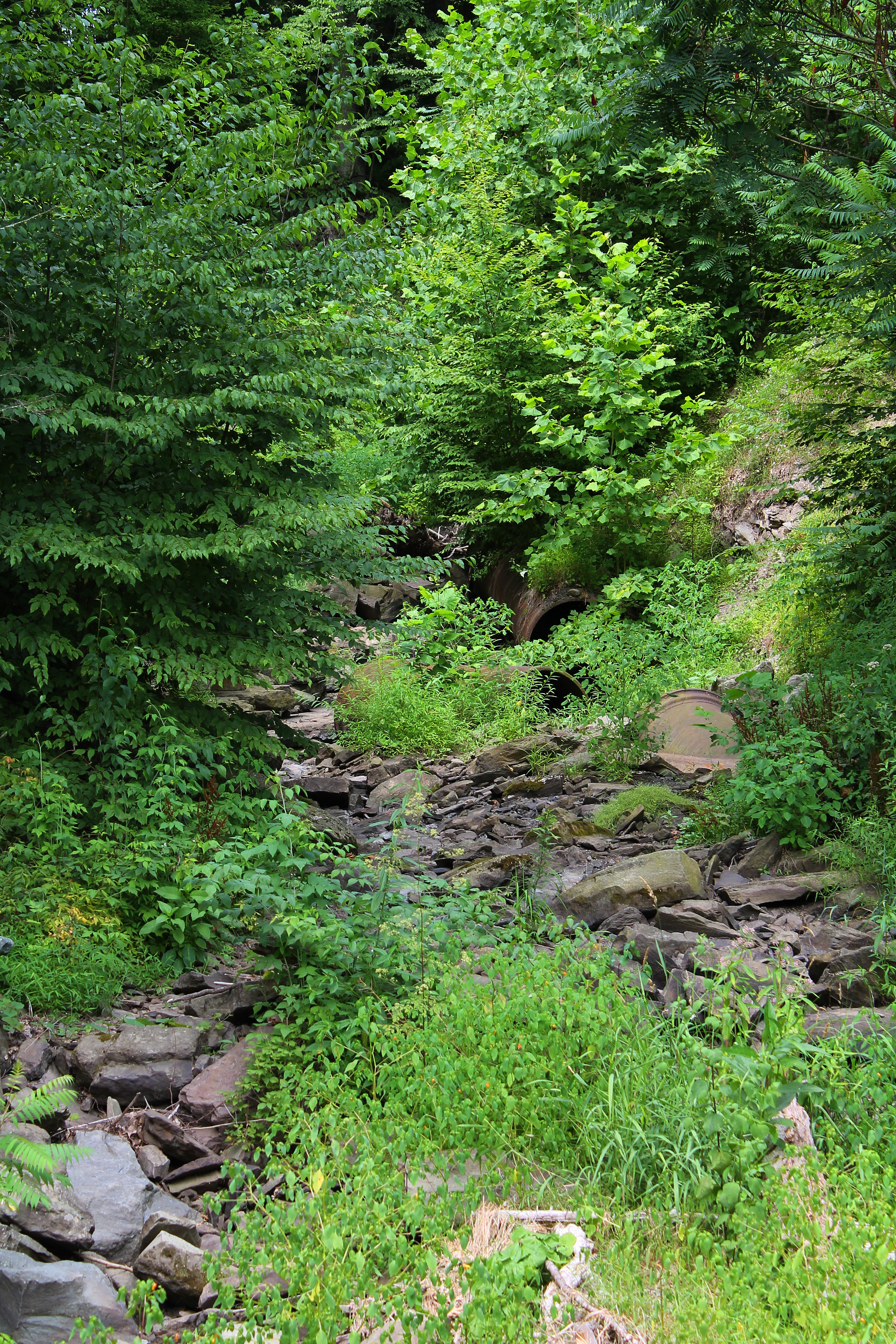
- Kern Glen Creek looking upstream

Physical characteristics
- Source
  - location: southeast of Kintner Hill in Lemon Township, Wyoming County, Pennsylvania
  - elevation: approximately 1,120 feet (341 m)
- Mouth
  - location: Billings Mill Brook in Tunkhannock Township, Wyoming County, Pennsylvania at Kern Glen
  - coordinates: 41°33′41″N 75°54′47″W
  - elevation: 659 ft (201 m)
- Length: 3.1 mi (5.0 km)
- Basin size: 2.71 sq mi (7.0 km^{2})

Basin features
- Progression: Billings Mill Brook → Tunkhannock Creek
- Tributaries
  - left: one unnamed tributary
  - right: one unnamed tributary

Kern Glen Creek (also known as Meadow Brook) is a tributary of Billings Mill Brook in Wyoming County, Pennsylvania, in the United States. It is approximately 3.1 miles (5.0 km) long and flows through Lemon Township and Tunkhannock Township. The watershed of the creek has an area of 2.71 square miles (7.0 km^{2}). The creek is not designated as an impaired waterbody. The surficial geology in its vicinity mostly consists of Wisconsinan Till.

== Course ==
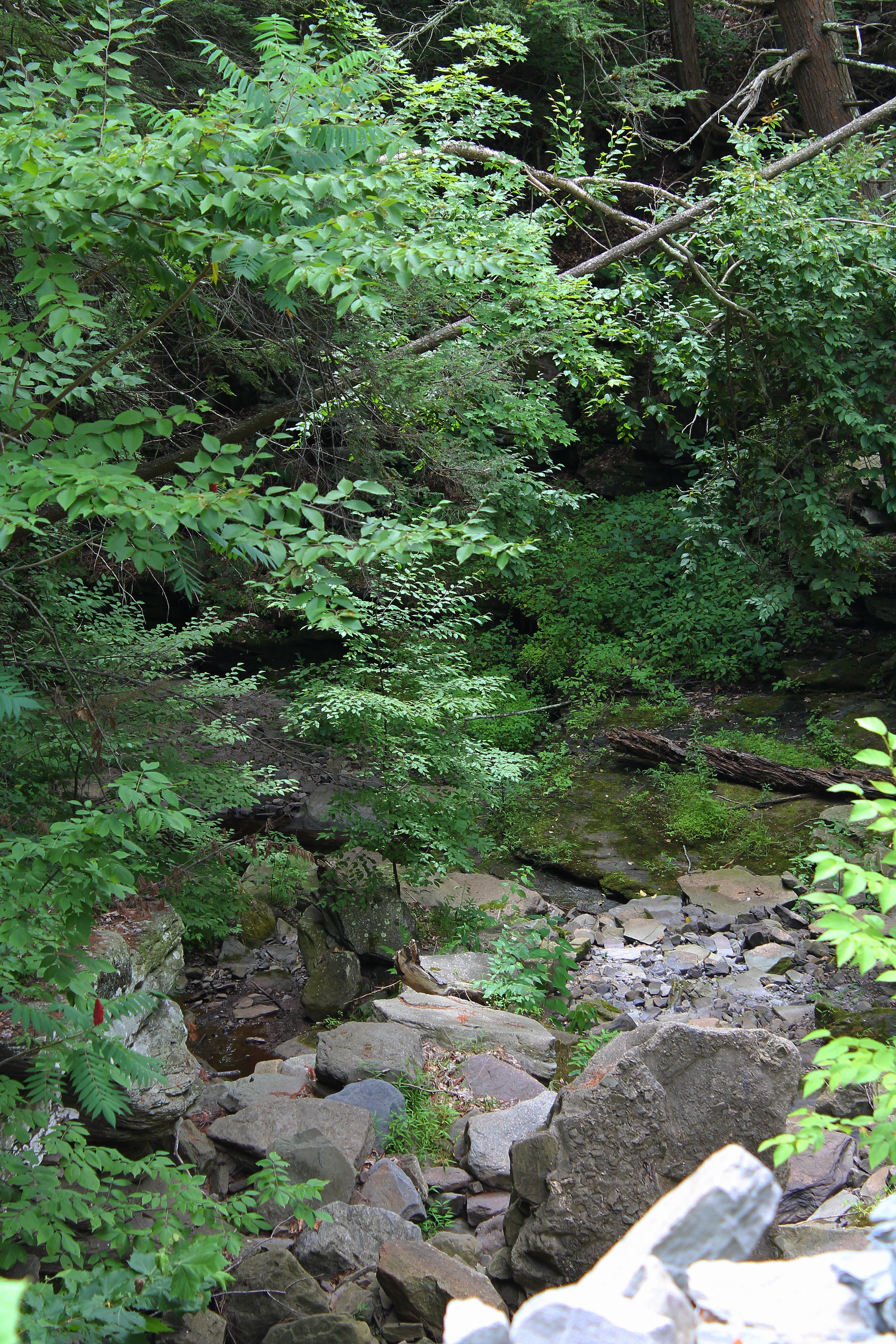
Kern Glen Creek looking downstream

Kern Glen Creek begins to the southeast of Kintner Hill in Lemon Township. It flows south for several tenths of a mile, almost immediately entering Tunkhannock Township, where it passes through one wetland and enters another. The creek goes through this wetland for a few tenths of a mile, receiving an unnamed tributary from the right before leaving the wetland at its southeastern edge. It continues flowing southeast for a few tenths of a mile, receiving an unnamed tributary from the left. After this, the creek turns east and crosses Pennsylvania Route 29 before turning southeast again. After a few tenths of a mile, it passes through a wetland with a lake and continues flowing southeast. Several tenths of a mile further downstream, it reaches its confluence with Billings Mill Brook.

Kern Glen Creek joins Billings Mill Brook 0.76 miles (1.22 km) upstream of its mouth.

== Hydrology ==
Kern Glen Creek is not designated as an impaired waterbody.

== Geography and geology ==
The elevation near the mouth of Kern Glen Creek is 659 feet (201 m) above sea level. The elevation of the creek's source is approximately 1,120 feet (341 m) above sea level.

The surficial geology in virtually all of the area in the vicinity of Kern Glen Creek consists of a till known as Wisconsinan Till. However, there are a few patches of wetlands, peat bogs, and lakes in the watershed. There is also a small patch of bedrock consisting of sandstone and shale near the creek's lower reaches.

Knobs of till cause the valley of Kern Glen Creek to be a beaded valley, with broader and narrower segments.

== Watershed ==
The watershed of Kern Glen Creek has an area of 2.71 square miles (7.0 km^{2}). The stream is entirely within the United States Geological Survey quadrangle of Tunkhannock. Its mouth is located at Kern Glen.

== History ==
Kern Glen Creek was entered into the Geographic Names Information System on August 2, 1979. Its identifier in the Geographic Names Information System is 1178398. The stream is also known as Meadow Brook. This variant name appears in Israel C. White's 1883 book The geology of the North Branch Susquehanna River Region in the six counties of Wyoming, Lackawanna, Luzerne, Columbia, Montour and Northumberland.

A $2000 bridge rehabilitation of a bridge carrying Pennsylvania Route 29 across Kern Glen Creek was authorized in the Special Session Capital Budget Act of 1996 for Flood Damaged Highway-Railroad and Highway Bridges. Chief Gathering LLC. once applied for and/or received a permit to build and maintain a 24-inch (61 cm) natural gas gathering pipeline and timber mats impacting an unnamed tributary Kern Glen Creek.

== See also ==
- List of rivers of Pennsylvania
