= Saxe Pond =

- Location within Pennsylvania
- Location: Bradford County, Pennsylvania
- Coordinates: 41.552°N 76.325°W
- Type: Reservoir
- Basin countries: United States
- Surface area: 64 acres (26 ha)

Saxe Pond is a small lake reservoir located in Bradford County, Pennsylvania.

== See also ==
- List of lakes in Pennsylvania
