= Tunkhannock Township, Pennsylvania =

Tunkhannock Township is the name of some places in the U.S. state of Pennsylvania:

- Tunkhannock Township, Monroe County, Pennsylvania
- Tunkhannock Township, Wyoming County, Pennsylvania
