= Lake Ashnoca =

Lake in North Carolina, United States

- Location: Buncombe County, North Carolina
- Coordinates: 35.5573°N 82.6152°E
- Type: Freshwater lake
- Primary inflows: Ragsdale Creek

Location
- Interactive map of Lake Ashnoca

Lake Ashnoca is a manmade lake in Buncombe County, North Carolina, near Enka. The lake was created by damming the Ragsdale Creek. It has been designated as trout fishing waters by the North Carolina Wildlife Resources Commission.
