= Beaver Lake (North Carolina) =

Lake in North Carolina

- Location within North Carolina
- Interactive map of Beaver Lake
- Location: Asheville, North Carolina
- Coordinates: 35°38′04″N 82°33′48″W
- Type: Reservoir
- Primary inflows: Beaverdam Creek
- First flooded: 1923
- Surface area: 50 acres (20 ha)
- Max. depth: 28 feet (8.5 m)

Beaver Lake is a freshwater lake in Asheville, Buncombe County, North Carolina. The community of Lakeview Park, which was built around Beaver Lake, is now a subdivision of Asheville.

== Physical characteristics ==
Beaver Lake has an area of 50 acres, and is 28 feet deep at its greatest depth. Its primary inflow is Beaverdam Creek, although it is also fed by rainfall.

== History ==
On January 19, 1922, the Asheville Citizen-Times reported that there were plans to build a resort around Beaverdam Creek. The Lake View Park Company 1,100 acres of land on both sides of the creek for development, with plans for an artificial lake, homes, hotels and a golf course. Additional land was purchased from the estate of Paul Roebling.

Construction was originally cancelled because the company could not reach an agreement with the Asheville and East Tennessee Railroad, whose lines crossed the area that the lake would cover. After the railway went bankrupt in January 1923, the project resumed. Damming Beaverdam Creek flooded Baird's Bottoms, creating Beaver Lake. The lake was stocked with fish for sporting purposes and a concrete bridge was built across the dam to facilitate access by car.

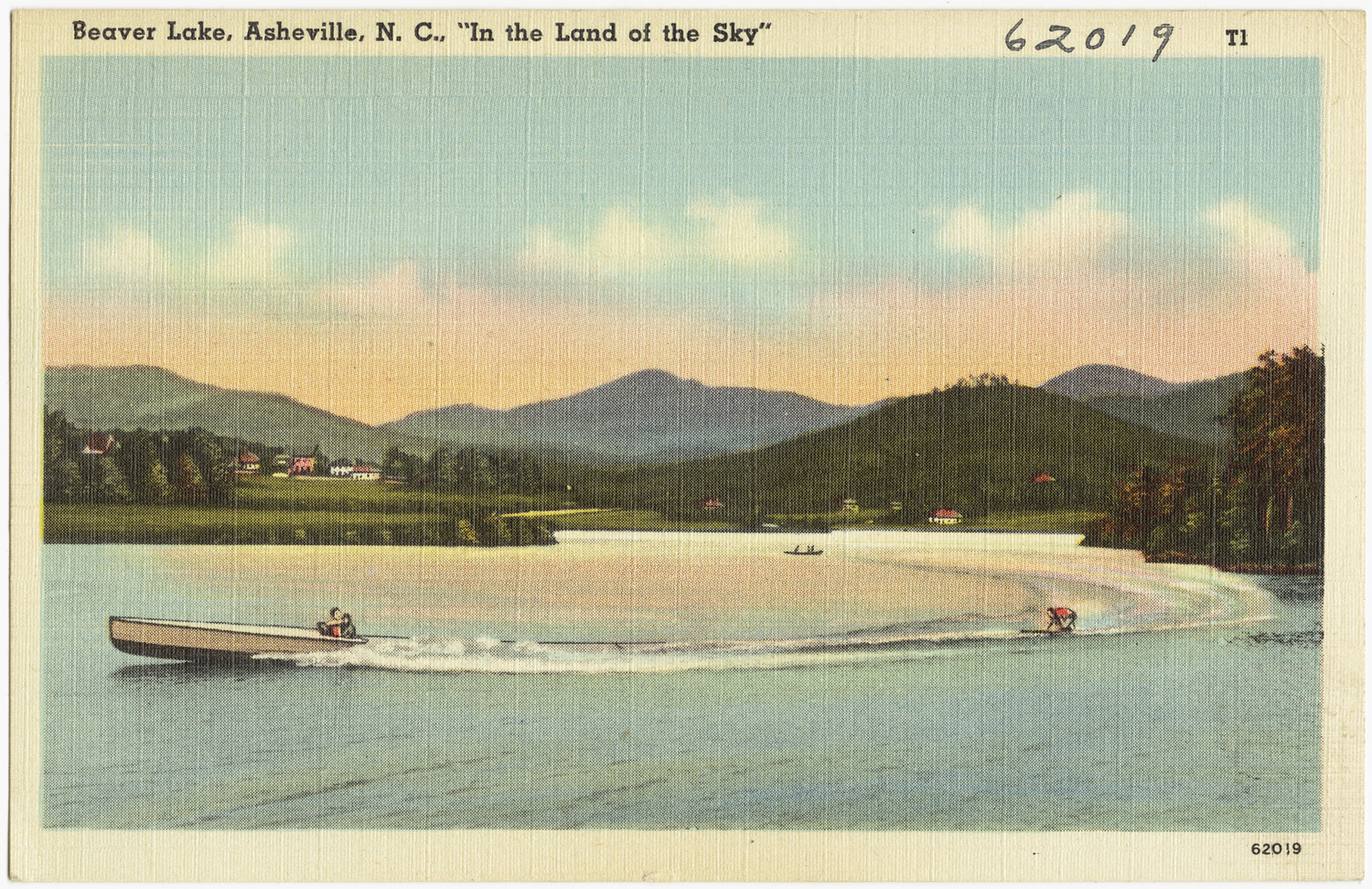
Beaver Lake postcard c. 1930-1945

The community of Beaver Lake, which was later renamed Lakeview Park, was planned by architect John Nolen. It was built outside of Asheville's official limits, but contributed to the city's growth. The first homes at Beaver Lake built made in the Tudor Revival and Colonial Revival styles. The area was located on the Dixie Highway, and experienced a real estate boom in the early 1920s, as the lake and other amenities (such as a swimming pool and golf course) were built. The Beaver Lake Country Club was established in 1921 as an exclusive club, and became open to public membership in 1924 before being renamed the Beaver Lake Golf Club. By 1927, it was a popular destination for lakeside water recreation, and it had "one of the most magnificent swimming pools in the East".

The Great Depression ended the town's economic prosperity until it experienced a renaissance in the 1960s. The original investors who built Beaver Lake lost much of their wealth after the Central Bank & Trust crashed in 1930 due to poor real estate returns. Simpler family homes were built in the area after WWII. The wall between the lake and the adjoining pool was removed in 1952, as the cost of repairing it was deemed too high.

== Conservation ==
The 8-acre Beaver Lake Bird Sanctuary is owned by the National Audubon Society.
