= Mud Lake (Pennsylvania) =

There are several lakes named Mud Lake within the U.S. state of Pennsylvania.

- Mud Lake, Crawford County, Pennsylvania. 41°33′14″N 80°22′05″W
- Lilly Lake, also known as Mud Lake, Lackawanna County, Pennsylvania. 41°32′40″N 75°43′25″W
- Mud Lake, Lancaster County, Pennsylvania. 40°03′22″N 76°27′09″W
- Mud Lake, Sullivan County, Pennsylvania. 41°22′26″N 76°41′26″W
- Margaret Lake, also known as Mud Lake, Wayne County, Pennsylvania. 41°48′03″N 75°12′07″W

== See also ==
- List of lakes in Pennsylvania
