= Beaver Run Reservoir =

- Beaver Dam Reservoir
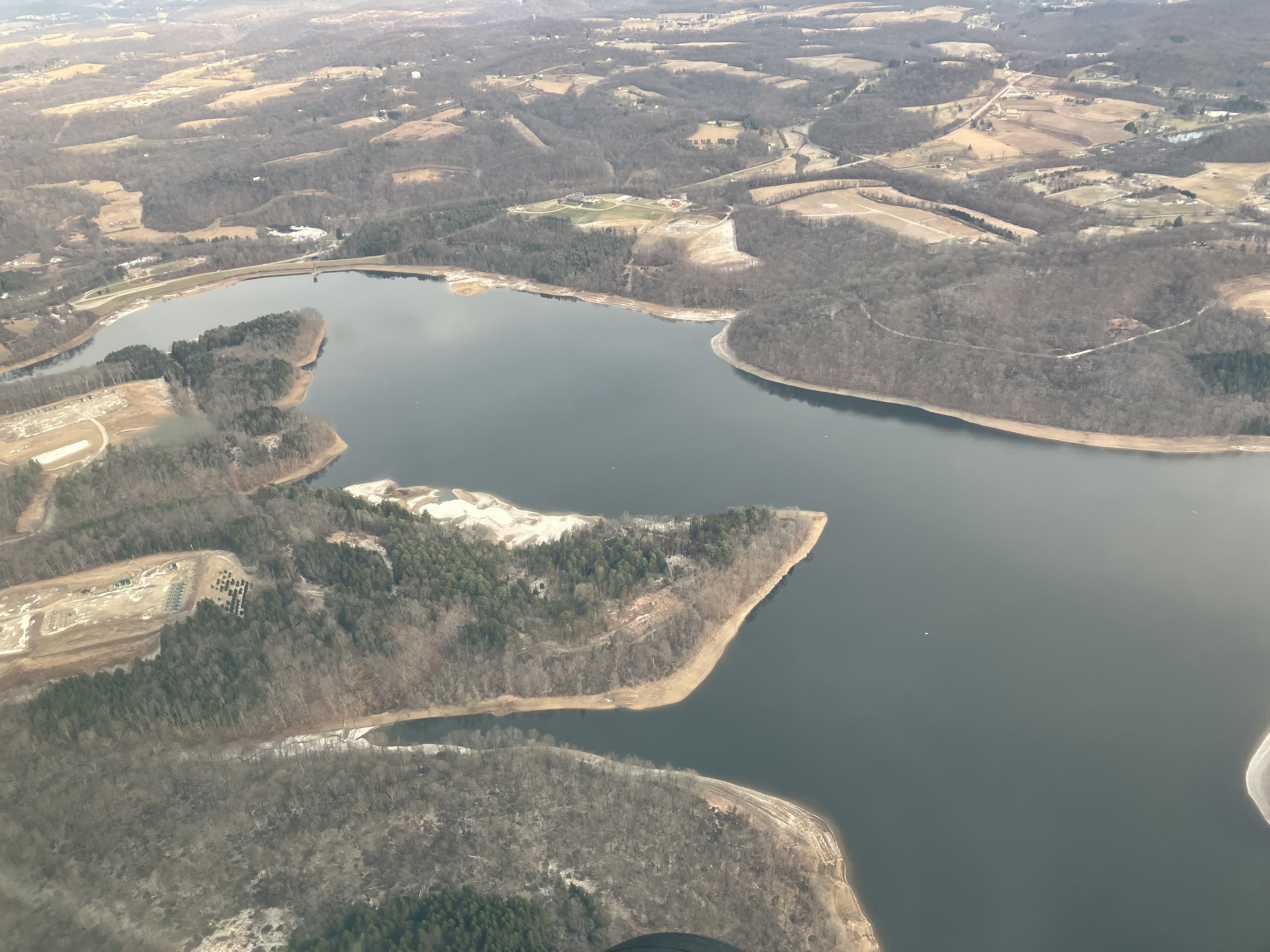
- View of the lake in 2024

- Location within Pennsylvania
- Location: Westmoreland County, Pennsylvania
- Coordinates: 40°28′55″N 79°33′25″W
- Type: reservoir
- Surface area: 1,005 acres (407 ha)
- Surface elevation: 1,053 feet (321 m)

Beaver Run Reservoir (also known as Beaver Dam Reservoir) is a reservoir in Westmoreland County in the U.S. state of Pennsylvania, 23 miles (37 km) east of Pittsburgh. The elevation of Beaver Run Reservoir is 1,053 feet (321 m) above sea level.

The reservoir is the source of drinking water for 150,000 people, including those in Murrysville, Export and Delmont.

Fishing in the reservoir and hiking near the reservoir are not allowed, due to public health concerns.

== Gas drilling ==
The Municipal Authority of Westmoreland County (MAWC), the local water utility, leased the watershed in 1999 for gas drilling, and about 100 shallow gas wells have been drilled since then. And in 2008, deeper drilling and fracking for gas in the Marcellus shale began near the reservoir. As of 2013, 41 deep wells have been drilled on 6 pads. The drillers are Consol Energy's CNX Gas.

Some of the chemicals used by Consol for fracking have been listed online by the MAWC. There is no information on the location, date, or total quantities of chemicals used, but Material Safety Data Sheets discuss the hazards and properties of these chemicals and others:

- hydrochloric acid;
- DAP-901-1, which contains methanol and phosphoric acid, and other toxic chemicals;
- DWP-938-1, which contains methyl alcohol and other toxic chemicals;
- DWP-944-3, which contains polyethylene glycol and other toxic chemicals; and
- crystalline silica.

In June 2013 there was a spill of 100 gallons of recycled frack wastewater into the ground at a pad near the reservoir. To limit pollution from the spill, soil was excavated, and testing for chlorides was done, and the tests indicated acceptable chloride levels. Fracking resumed several days later.

== Selling water for fracking ==
The reservoir's water has frequently been sold to energy companies for use in fracking operations. Most recently, Olympus Energy of Canonsburg will purchase millions of gallons of water per day from the reservoir for four months starting in May 2022.

== See also ==
- List of lakes in Pennsylvania
- List of reservoirs and dams in the United States
- List of rivers of Pennsylvania
- List of tributaries of the Allegheny River
