= Nelson Welsh Congregational Church =

Historic church in New York, United States

- U.S. National Register of Historic Places
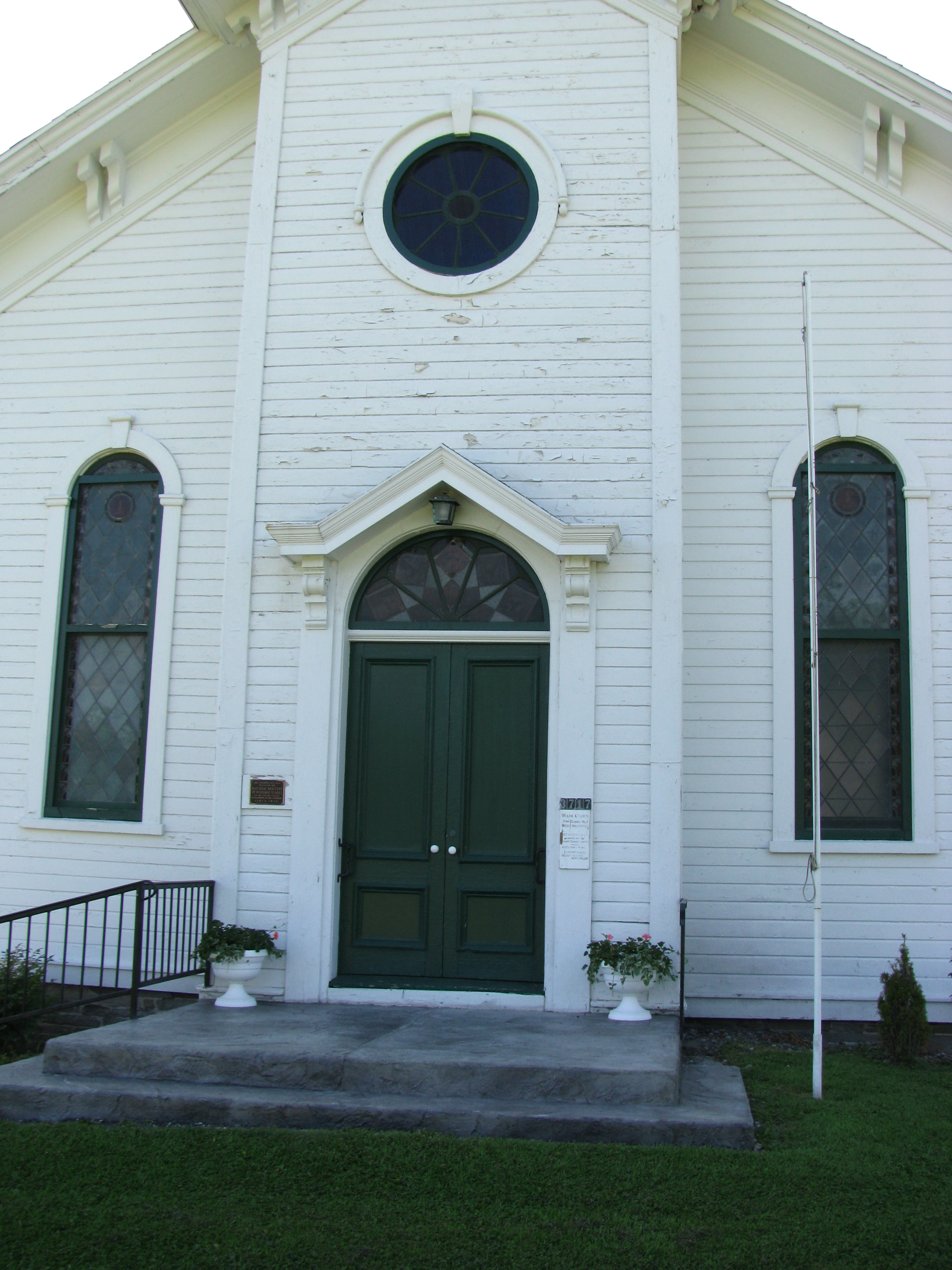
- Entrance to the church

- Location within New York Location within the United States
- Nearest city: Nelson, New York
- Coordinates: 42°54′7″N 75°45′17″W
- Area: 6.1 acres (2.5 ha)
- Built: 1876
- Architect: Perry, Orrin; Jones, James T.
- Architectural style: Late Victorian
- NRHP reference No.: 93000681
- Added to NRHP: August 6, 1993

Nelson Welsh Congregational Church is a historic Congregational church located at Nelson, Madison County, New York. It was built in 1876, and is a one-story, three bay by four bay, timber-frame structure with a gable roof and stone foundation. It measures 34 feet by 55 feet. It features a three-stage bell tower with octagonal spire. Also on the property are a contributing privy and cemetery. The cemetery contains the graves of Nelson's earliest settlers with the oldest stone dated to 1809.

It was added to the National Register of Historic Places in 1993.

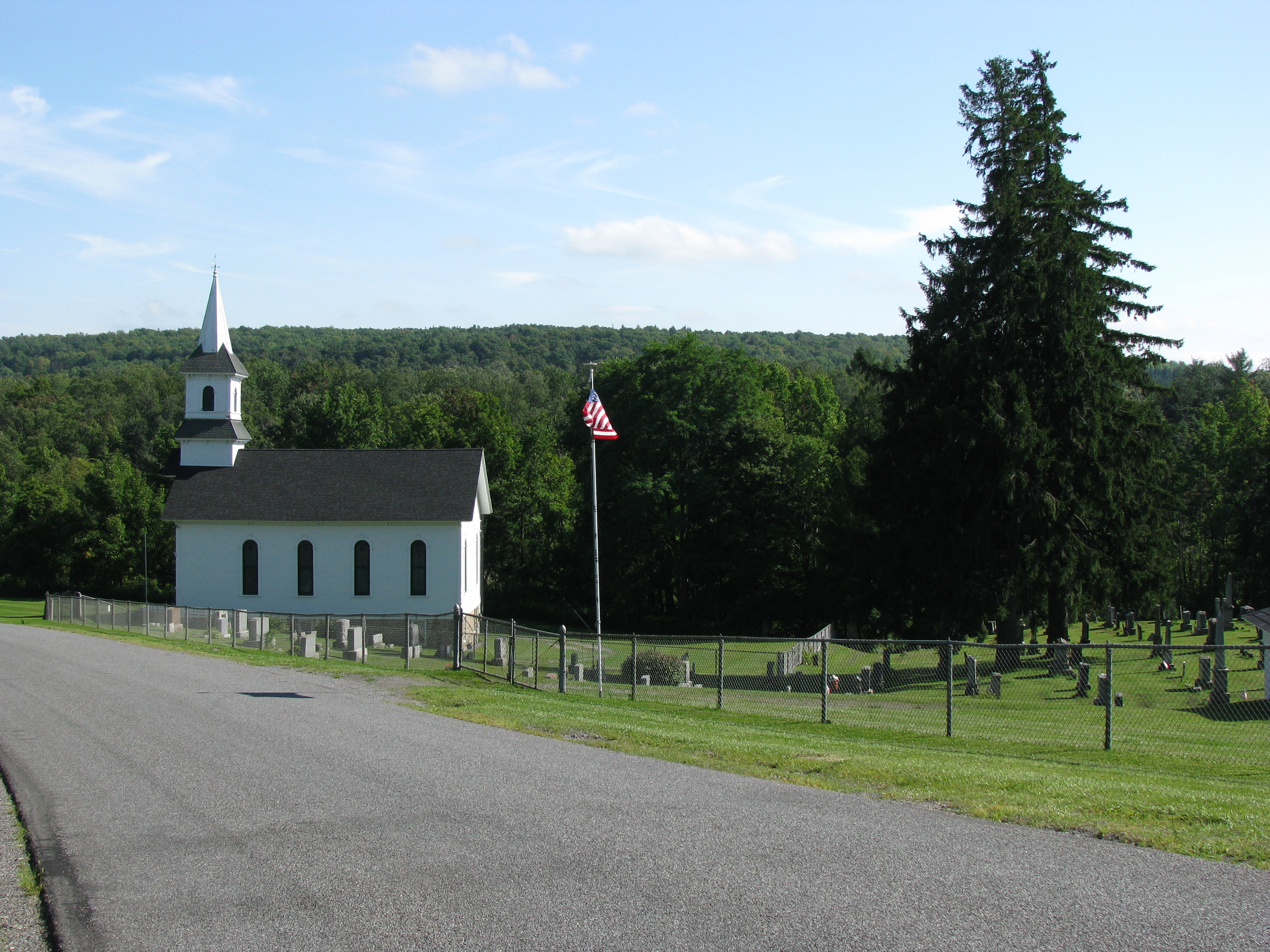
The church and its cemetery
