= Stoney Pond =

- Location within New York Location within the United States
- Location: Madison County, New York, United States
- Coordinates: 42°53′03.4″N 75°42′50.1″W
- Type: Lake
- Basin countries: United States
- Surface area: 44 acres (0.18 km^{2})
- Average depth: 6 ft (1.8 m)
- Max. depth: 11 ft (3.4 m)
- Surface elevation: 1,560 ft (480 m)
- Islands: 11
- Settlements: Bucks Corners, New York

Stoney Pond is a man-made lake located by Bucks Corners, New York. Fish species present in the lake include pumpkinseed sunfish, and largemouth bass. There is access by carry down off Stoney Pond Road.
