= Billings Mill Brook =

Billings Mill Brook Mill Brook, Billings Mill Creek
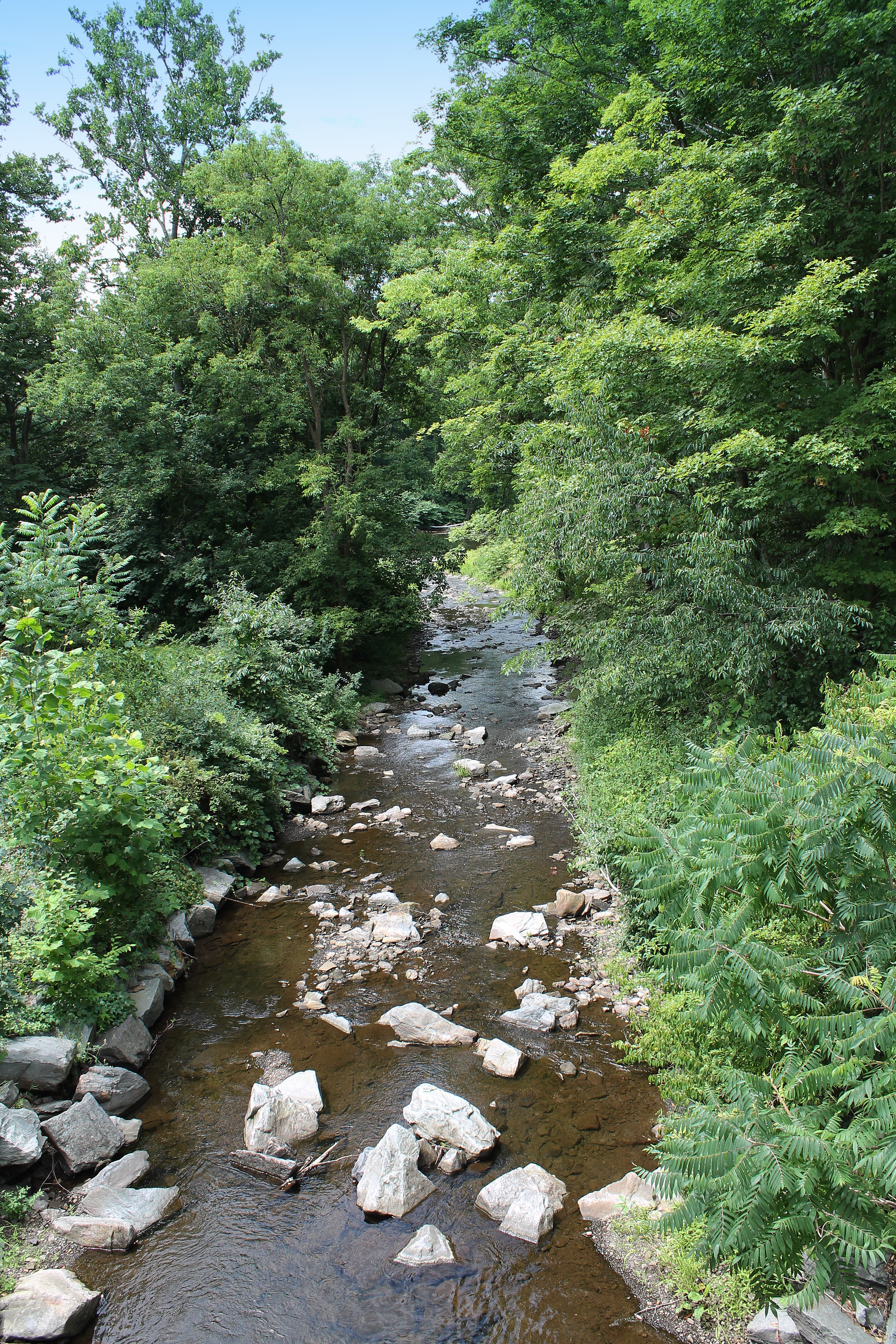
- Billings Mill Brook looking downstream

Physical characteristics
- Source
  - location: Helman Swamp in Lemon Township, Wyoming County, Pennsylvania
  - elevation: between 1,020 and 1,040 feet (311 and 317 m)
- Mouth
  - location: Tunkhannock Creek in Tunkhannock Township, Wyoming County, Pennsylvania, near Tunkhannock
  - coordinates: 41°33′10″N 75°55′18″W
  - elevation: 604 ft (184 m)
- Length: 3.5 mi (5.6 km)
- Basin size: 12.7 mi^{2} (33 km^{2})

Basin features
- Progression: Tunkhannock Creek → Susquehanna River → Chesapeake Bay
- Tributaries
  - right: Kern Glen Creek

Billings Mill Brook (also known as Mill Brook or Billings Mill Creek) is a tributary of Tunkhannock Creek in Wyoming County, Pennsylvania, in the United States. It is approximately 3.5 miles (5.6 km) long and flows through Lemon Township and Tunkhannock Township. The watershed of the stream has an area of 12.7 square miles (33 km^{2}). The stream has one named tributary, which is known as Kern Glen Creek. The surficial geology in the vicinity of Billings Mill Brook mainly consists of Wisconsinan Till, alluvium, and several others. A lake known as Lake Carey is in the stream's watershed. A number of bridges have also been constructed over Billings Mill Brook. The stream's watershed is designated as a Coldwater Fishery and a Migratory Fishery.

== Course ==
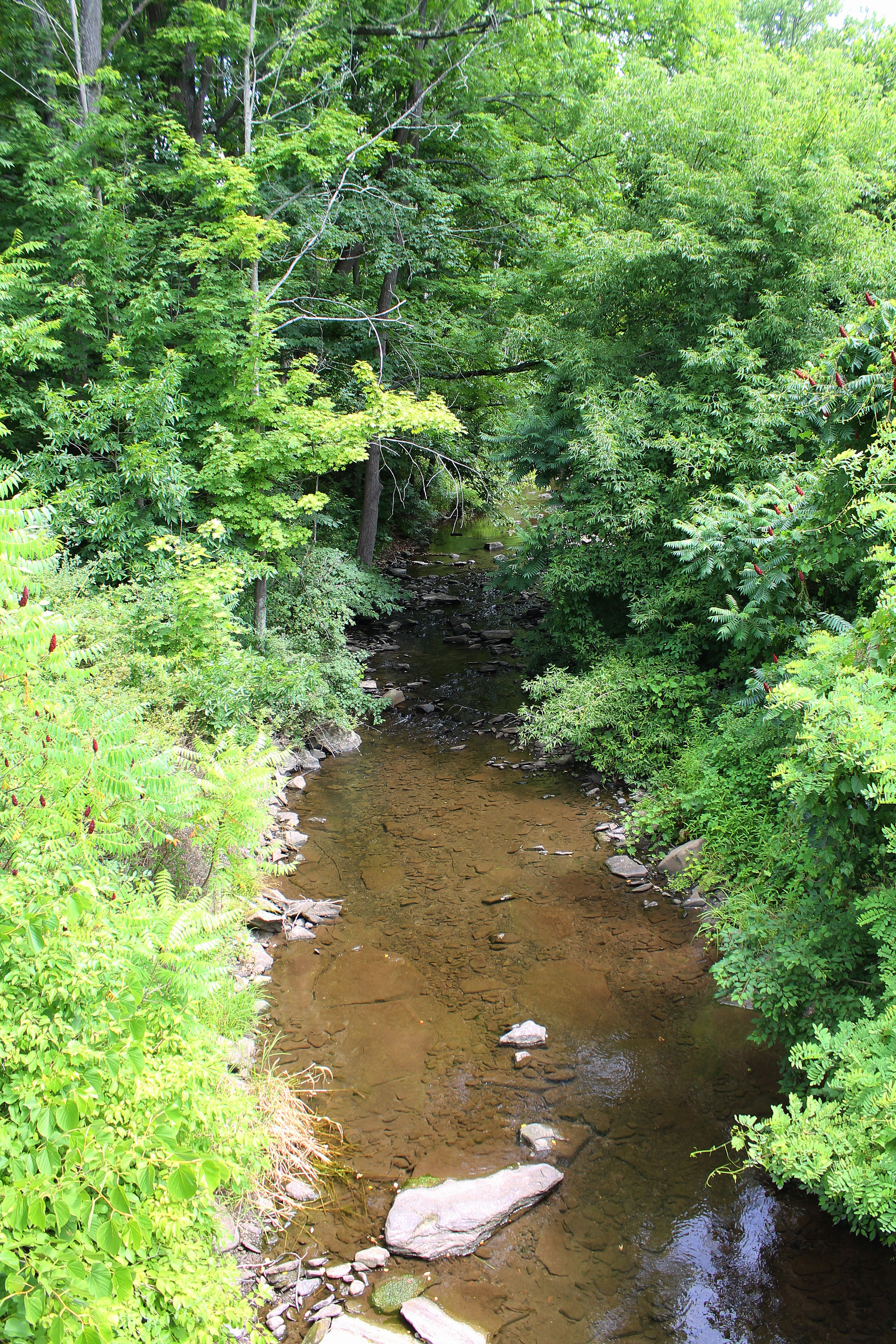
Billings Mill Brook looking upstream

Billings Mill Brook begins in Helman Swamp in Lemon Township. It flows south-southwest through a valley for several tenths of a mile and enters Tunkhannock Township before turning south. After a few tenths of a mile, it turns southwest for a short distance before turning south-southeast. After several tenths of a mile, the stream turns south-southwest for several tenths of a mile before receiving Kern Glen Creek, its only named tributary, from the right. The stream then continues flowing south-southwest as its valley broadens. After several tenths of a mile, it reaches its confluence with Tunkhannock Creek.

Billings Mill Brook joins Tunkhannock Creek 2.78 miles (4.47 km) upstream of its mouth.

=== Tributaries ===
Billings Mill Brook has one named tributary, which is known as Kern Glen Creek. Kern Glen Creek joins Billings Mill Brook 0.76 miles (1.22 km) upstream of its mouth, at Kern Glen, and drains an area of 2.71 square miles (7.0 km^{2}).

== Geography and geology ==
The elevation near the mouth of Billings Mill Brook is 604 feet (184 m) above sea level. The elevation of the stream's source is between 1,020 and 1,040 feet (311 and 317 m) above sea level.

A large mass of partially quarried sand and gravel occurs at the mouth of Billings Mill Brook. The surficial geology along the lower and middle reaches of the stream mainly consists of alluvium. However, there are patches of Wisconsinan Ice-Contact Stratified Drift at the mouth and alluvial fan further upstream. The surficial geology in the stream's upper reaches consists of a till known as Wisconsinan Till, which also lines its valley throughout its length. Wetlands, peat bogs, lakes, and bedrock consisting of sandstone and shale also occur in the watershed's surficial geology.

Billings Mill Brook flows through a valley known as Whippoorwill Hollow in its upper reaches. At the stream's headwaters, there is a swamp known as Helman Swamp, which is bordered by a small lake.

== Watershed ==
The watershed of Billings Mill Brook has an area of 12.7 square miles (33 km^{2}). The stream is entirely within the United States Geological Survey quadrangle of Tunkhannock. The mouth of the stream is located near Tunkhannock.

A lake known as Lake Carey is in the watershed of Billings Mill Brook. The lake is one of the largest lakes in the area to be dammed by glacial deposits, though it also has a manmade dam with a height of 10 feet (3.0 m). From the lake's outlet, water drops 130 feet (40 m) over several rock ledge waterfalls to Billings Mill Brook.

== History ==
Billings Mill Brook was entered into the Geographic Names Information System on August 2, 1979. Its identifier in the Geographic Names Information System is 1169625. The stream is also known as Mill Brook or Billings Mill Creek. The former variant name appears in Israel C. White's 1883 book The geology of the North Branch Susquehanna River Region in the six counties of Wyoming, Lackawanna, Luzerne, Columbia, Montour and Northumberland.

Historically, there was a grist and cider mill in the watershed of Billings Mill Brook.

A prestressed box beam or girders bridge carrying State Route 1002 over Billings Mill Brook in Tunkhannock Township was built in 1990 and is 21.0 feet (6.4 m) long. A concrete slab bridge carrying State Route 1001 over the stream in Tunkhannock Township was built in 2006 and is 61.0 feet (18.6 m) long.

Williams Companies and the Pennsylvania Department of Environmental Protection once worked together to carry out the Billings Mill Brook Stream Habitat Enhancement Project. This project improved streambank stability, reduced stream meander migration, and improved habitat quality. Williams Field Services Company, LLC. also once received a permit to construct a natural gas gathering pipeline in the vicinity of the stream.

== Biology ==
The drainage basin of Billings Mill Brook is designated as a Coldwater Fishery and a Migratory Fishery. Wild trout naturally reproduce in the stream in its lower 2.48 miles (3.99 km).

== See also ==
- Swale Brook, next tributary of Tunkhannock Creek going downstream
- South Branch Tunkhannock Creek, next tributary of Tunkhannock Creek going upstream
- List of rivers of Pennsylvania
