= Fairview Lake (Pennsylvania) =

- Location within Pennsylvania Location within the United States
- Location: Palmyra Township, Pike County, Pennsylvania, US
- Coordinates: 41°23′50″N 75°11′10″W
- Type: Reservoir
- Basin countries: United States
- Surface area: 192 acres (0.78 km^{2})
- Max. depth: 48 ft (15 m)
- Surface elevation: 1,524 ft (465 m)

Fairview Lake is a 192 acres (0.78 km^{2}) natural lake located in Palmyra Township, Pike County, Pennsylvania in the United States, just south of Lake Wallenpaupack.

The lake has a maximum depth of 48 feet (15 m). The lake is home to one of the most distinctive land forms in the state - running through the middle of this waterway is a ridge over which the water is only three to five feet deep.

The lake is a prime fishing and boating area. Boating is permitted on the lake, and gas motors are permitted. The Pennsylvania Fish and Boat Commission maintains a small boat launch facility on the southwestern corner of the lake, capacity approximately 10 cars with trailers. Boat access can be reached by taking SR 0390 north from I-84 to SR 4004.

== See also ==
- List of lakes in Pennsylvania
