= Nelson, New York =

- Town
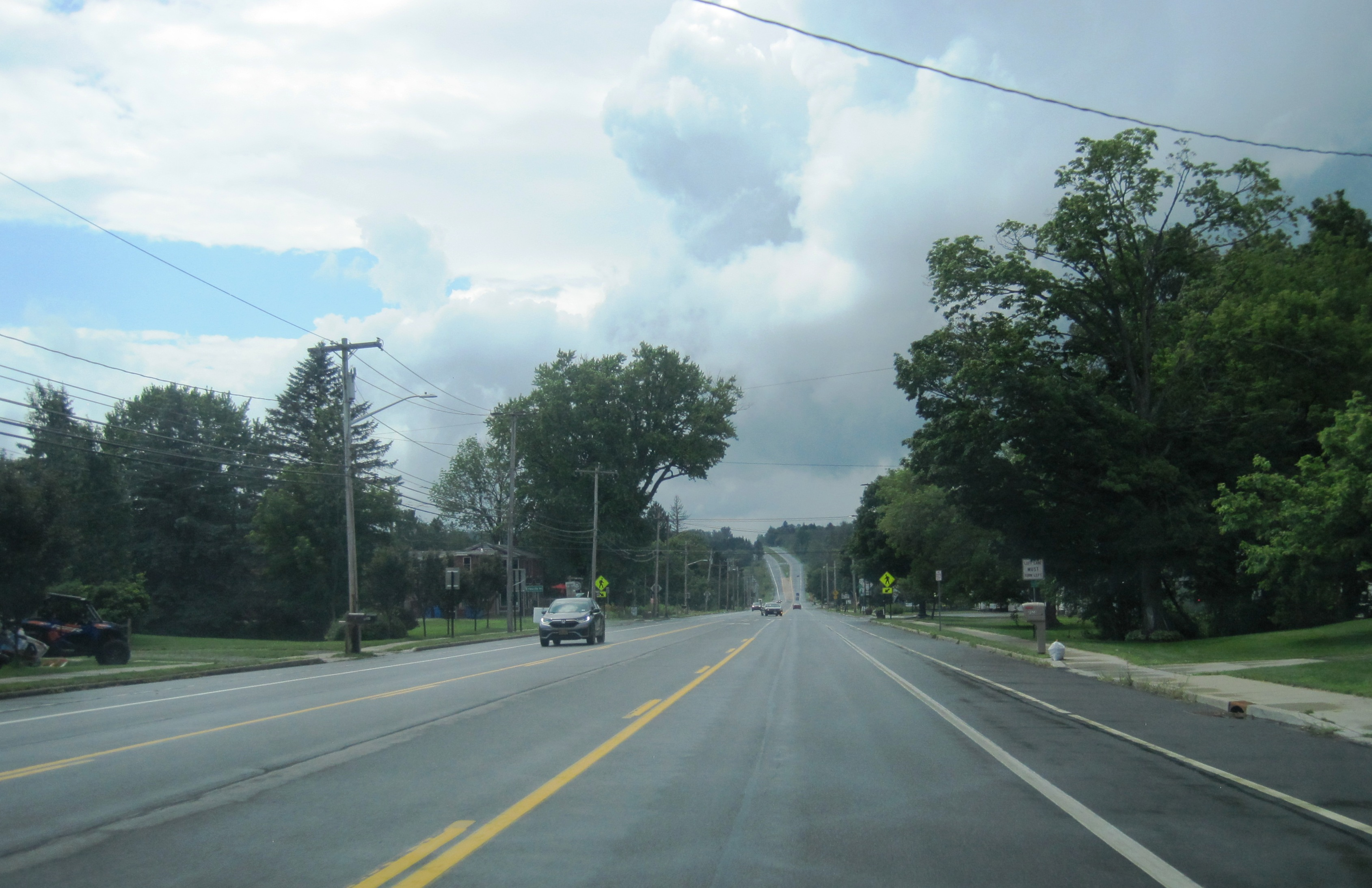
- Hamlet of Nelson within the town along US 20 westbound

- Location within New York Location within the United States
- Coordinates: 42°52′29″N 75°44′53″W
- Country: United States
- State: New York
- County: Madison

Government
  - Type: Town Council
  - Town Supervisor: Jim Cunningham (R)
  - Town Council: Members' List: • Michael J. Costello (D); • Denise M. Earl (R); • Dean A. Coe, Jr. (R); • Robert L. Davies, Jr. (R)

Area
  - Total: 44.05 sq mi (114.10 km^{2})
  - Land: 43.06 sq mi (111.52 km^{2})
  - Water: 1.00 sq mi (2.58 km^{2})
- Elevation: 1,503 ft (458 m)

Population (2020)
  - Total: 1,890
  - Density: 43.9/sq mi (16.95/km^{2})
- Time zone: UTC-5 (Eastern (EST))
  - Summer (DST): UTC-4 (EDT)
- ZIP codes: 13035 (Cazenovia); 13061 (Erieville); 13122 (New Woodstock); 13334 (Eaton); 13408 (Morrisville)
- Area code: 315
- FIPS code: 36-053-49770
- GNIS feature ID: 0979251
- Website: townofnelson-ny.com

Nelson is a town in Madison County, New York, United States. The population was 1,890 at the 2020 census. The town was named after Horatio Nelson, the English naval hero.

== History ==
The town was formed in 1807 from the town of Cazenovia, the year after Madison County was established.

The Nelson Welsh Congregational Church was listed on the National Register of Historic Places in 1993.

== Geography ==
Nelson is southwest of the geographic center of Madison County. US Route 20 passes across the town, leading east 7 miles (11 km) to Morrisville and west 4 miles (6 km) to Cazenovia.

According to the U.S. Census Bureau, the town has a total area of 44.1 square miles (114 km^{2}), of which 43.1 square miles (112 km^{2}) is land and 1.0 square mile (2.6 km^{2}), or 2.26%, is water. Tuscarora Lake is in the south-central part of the town, draining northwest toward Chittenango Creek, a north-flowing stream that leads to Oneida Lake, part of the Lake Ontario/St. Lawrence River watershed. Eaton Reservoir is in the eastern part of the town, draining into Eaton Creek, a tributary of the Chenango River that leads to the Susquehanna River and ultimately to Chesapeake Bay.

== Demographics ==
Historical population
Census	Pop.	Note	%±
1820	2,329		—
1830	2,445		5.0%
1840	2,100		−14.1%
1850	1,965		−6.4%
1860	1,797		−8.5%
1870	1,730		−3.7%
1880	1,649		−4.7%
1890	1,350		−18.1%
1900	1,296		−4.0%
1910	1,139		−12.1%
1920	1,099		−3.5%
1930	1,026		−6.6%
1940	928		−9.6%
1950	993		7.0%
1960	1,170		17.8%
1970	1,410		20.5%
1980	1,495		6.0%
1990	1,892		26.6%
2000	1,964		3.8%
2010	1,980		0.8%
2020	1,890		−4.5%
U.S. Decennial Census

As of the census of 2000, there were 1,964 people, 731 households, and 549 families residing in the town. The population density was 45.6 inhabitants per square mile (17.6/km^{2}). There were 1,020 housing units at an average density of 23.7 per square mile (9.2/km^{2}). The racial makeup of the town was 98.27% White, 0.20% African American, 0.10% Native American, 0.56% from other races, and 0.87% from two or more races. Hispanic or Latino of any race were 1.22% of the population.

There were 731 households, out of which 38.7% had children under the age of 18 living with them, 64.6% were married couples living together, 6.2% had a female householder with no husband present, and 24.8% were non-families. 18.9% of all households were made up of individuals, and 5.5% had someone living alone who was 65 years of age or older. The average household size was 2.69 and the average family size was 3.07.

In the town, the population was spread out, with 28.3% under the age of 18, 5.6% from 18 to 24, 29.0% from 25 to 44, 27.5% from 45 to 64, and 9.6% who were 65 years of age or older. The median age was 38 years. For every 100 females, there were 103.7 males. For every 100 females age 18 and over, there were 103.6 males.

The median income for a household in the town was $49,022, and the median income for a family was $55,458. Males had a median income of $37,083 versus $24,653 for females. The per capita income for the town was $21,378. About 2.8% of families and 5.1% of the population were below the poverty line, including 4.9% of those under age 18 and 6.5% of those age 65 or over.

== Communities and locations in Nelson ==
- Bucks Corner – A location in the northeastern part of the town.
- Eaton Reservoir – Most of the reservoir is in the town of Nelson by the eastern town line.
- Erieville – A hamlet in the southern part of the town, south of Tuscarora Lake.
- Hughs Corner – A location in the northeastern corner of the town.
- Nelson – The hamlet of Nelson is on Route 20 in the northwestern part of the town. It was formerly called "Nelson Flats" and "Skunk Hollow."
- Pughs Corner – A location east of Nelson village.
- Stoney Pond – A pond located north of Eaton Reservoir.
- Tuscarora Lake – A lake in the southern part of the town.

== Notable people ==
- Henry Dexter, sculptor; born in Nelson
