= Lake Julian (North Carolina) =

Reservoir in North Carolina

Coordinates: 35°28′31″N 82°32′15″W

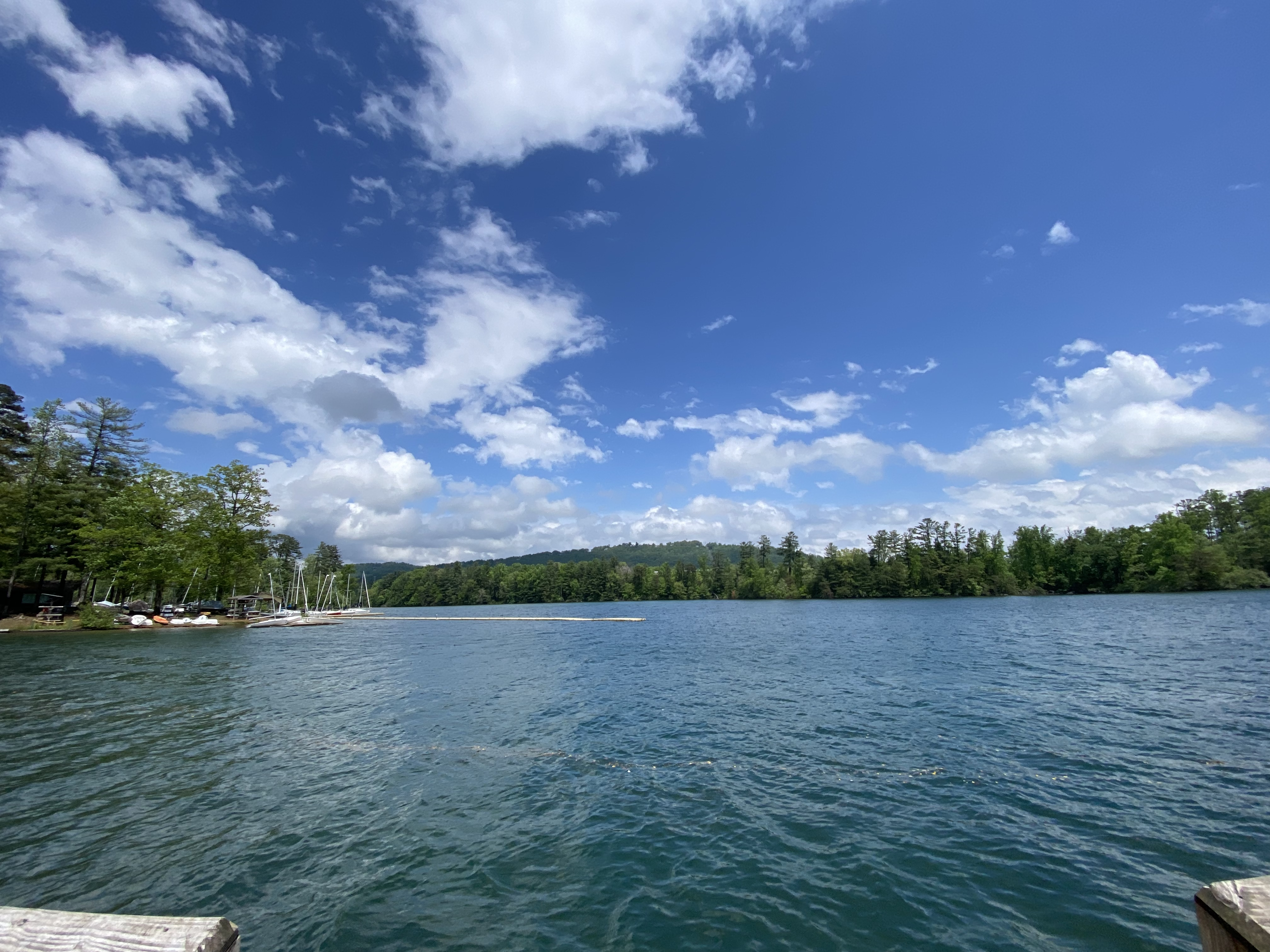
- Interactive map of Lake Julian
- Location: Buncombe County, North Carolina
- Type: Reservoir
- First flooded: 1962
- Surface area: 321 acres (130 ha)
- Max. depth: 30 feet (9.1 m)

Lake Julian is a reservoir in Buncombe County, North Carolina, formerly used to cool a nearby power plant.

== Physical characteristics ==
The lake has a surface area of 321 acres and an average depth of 13 feet, with a maximum depth of 30 feet. The lake's waters are stocked with game fish such as catfish, crappies, and bream by the North Carolina Wildlife Resources Commission.

== History ==
It was created by Carolina Power & Light Company in 1962. Originally built by Carolina Power & Light Company in 1962 as a reservoir to cool the nearby Progress Energy Asheville Plant, the lake also served as a discharge site for heated water used to cool the plant's turbines.

The lake was formerly warmed by the energy plant, which discharged water used to cool its turbines. This maintained an average water temperature of 64 degrees fahrenheit, with summer highs up to 95 degrees and winter lows above 50 degrees. These unnaturally warm temperatures allowed non-native species such as blue tilapia and armoured catfish to thrive in the lake. After the plant switched from coal to natural gas in 2020, the lake's temperature dropped, causing the ecosystem to revert to a more natural population of native fish and resulting in a shorter growing season.
