= Lower Woods Pond =

- Location within Pennsylvania
- Location: Lebanon Township, Wayne, Pennsylvania, United States
- Coordinates: 41°44′34.3674″N 75°16′20.64″W
- Type: Lake
- Surface area: 91 acres (37 ha)
- Surface elevation: 1,407 ft (429 m)

Lower Woods Pond is a 91-acre lake in Lebanon Township, Wayne County, Pennsylvania in the United States.

Managed by the Pennsylvania Fish and Boat Commission, Lower Woods Pond is a 50-acre natural lake that was dammed, increasing its size to its current 91 acres. The lake is able to be fished by electric and non-motorized boats only and a permit is required. Some fish that can be found include Largemouth bass, Bluegill, and Walleye.

== See also ==
- List of lakes in Pennsylvania
