= Lake Muhlenberg =

Lake in Pennsylvania, United States

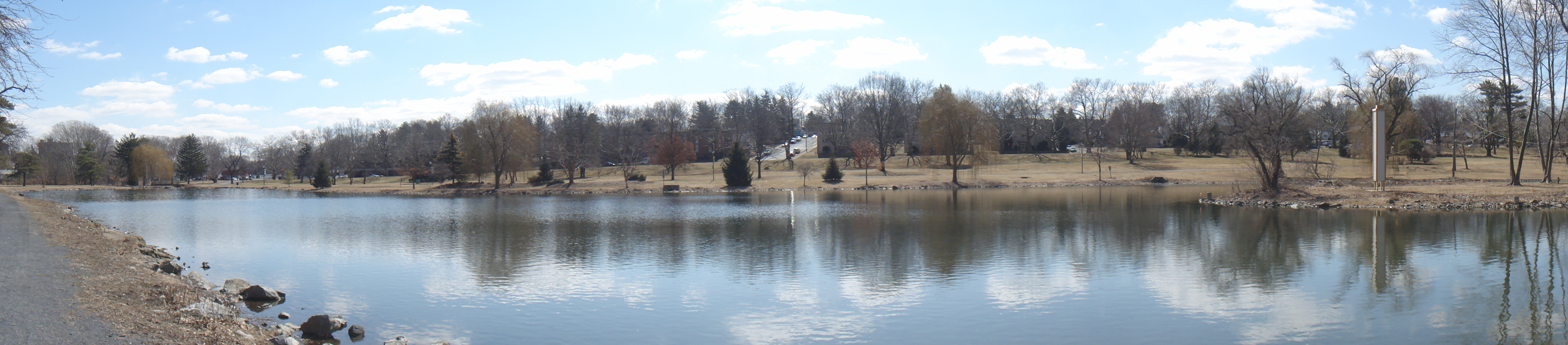
- Lake Muhlenberg in March 2014

- Location within Pennsylvania Location within the United States
- Location: Allentown, Pennsylvania, U.S.
- Coordinates: 40°35′39″N 75°30′21″W
- Primary inflows: Cedar Creek
- Primary outflows: Cedar Creek
- Basin countries: United States
- Surface area: 6 acres (2.4 ha)
- Surface elevation: 272 ft (83 m)
- Islands: Sparkle Island

Lake Muhlenberg, sometimes called Muhlenberg Lake, is a lake in Cedar Creek Park located in Allentown, Pennsylvania.

== Overview ==
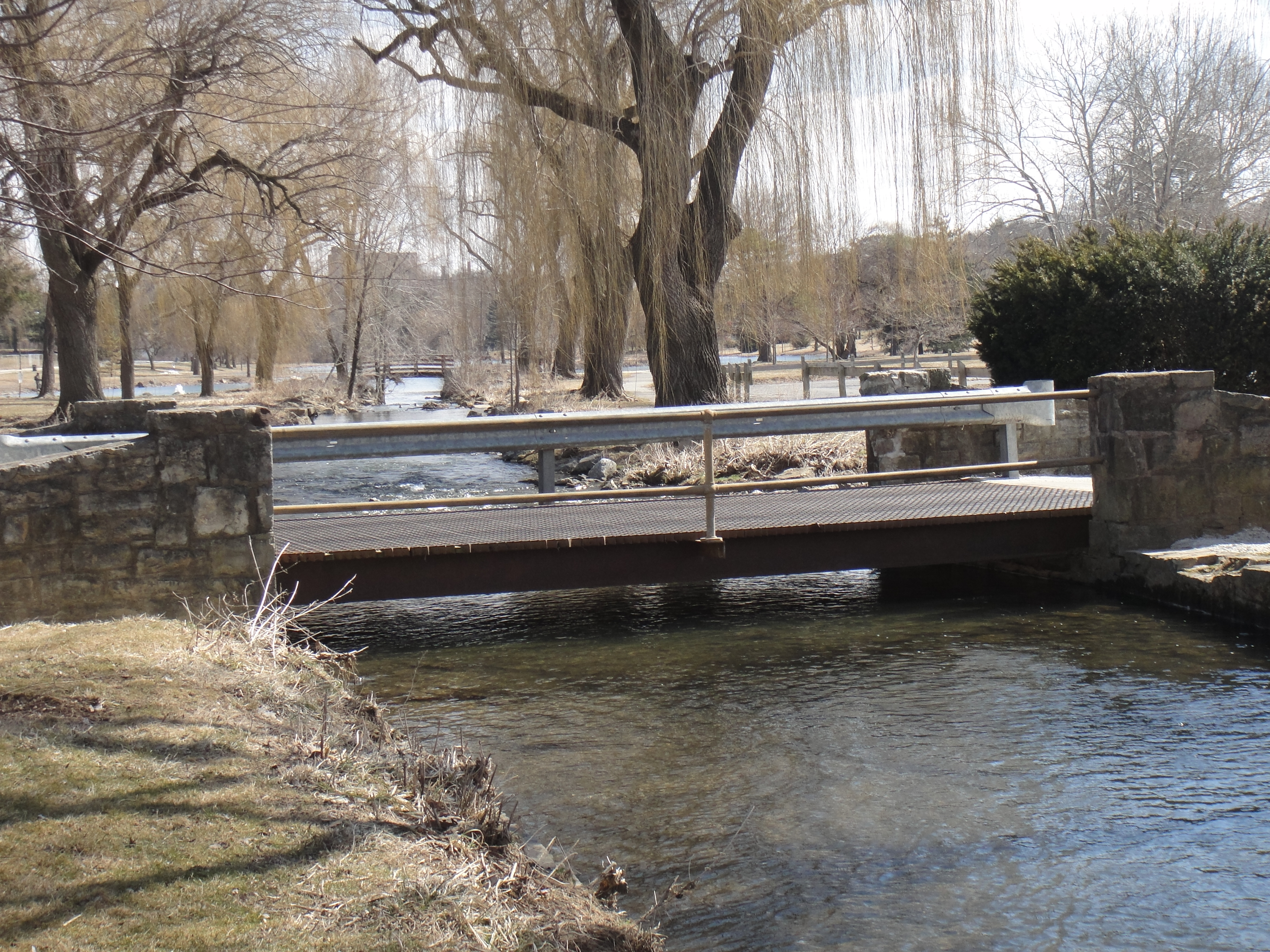
Cedar Creek at the Cedar Creek Park flowing into Lake Muhlenberg

The lake is so-named due to its proximity to Muhlenberg College, which was named for Henry Muhlenberg, the patriarch of the Lutheran Church in the United States. The lake is situated in Cedar Creek Park and is part of Allentown's park system. Lake Muhlenberg is stocked for fishing and is a refuge for many ducks and Canada geese. Cedar Creek flows into and out of the lake.

In its center is Sparkle Island. In 2013, the Lehigh Valley Audubon Society installed a 20 feet (6.1 m) tall chimney swift tower on the island. The tower has insulation panels to prevent the chimney from getting too hot in late spring, which could threaten wildlife living there.

In 2013, the lake was chemically treated and cleaned, removing the overgrown algae and making it more appealing overall. The herbicides used were not harmful to the fish and surrounding wildlife.

== Festivals ==
"Blues, Brews, and Barbeque," which launched in 2014, is held annually at Cedar Beach Park on Lake Muhlenberg.

== See also ==
- List of lakes in Pennsylvania
