= Lake Manjo =

Lake in Pennsylvania, United States

- Manjo Lake
- Location within Pennsylvania Location within the United States
- Location: Franklin Township, Luzerne County, Pennsylvania
- Coordinates: 41°23′26″N 75°55′31″W
- Primary outflows: unnamed tributary to Sutton Creek
- Built: in or before 1938
- Surface area: 9 acres (3.6 ha)
- Surface elevation: 1,220 feet (370 m)

Lake Manjo (also known as Manjo Lake) is a manmade lake in Luzerne County, Pennsylvania, in the United States. It has a surface area of approximately 9 acres (3.6 ha) and is situated in Franklin Township. The surficial geology near the lake consists of bedrock and Wisconsinan Till. The lake is not accessible to the public. However, a camp known as Camp Orchard Hill is located near the lake.

== Geography and geology ==
The main outflow of Lake Manjo as an unnamed stream that joins Sutton Creek at Lake Louise. The elevation near the lake is 1,220 feet (370 m) above sea level.

Lake Manjo is a small artificial pond. There is a road in the vicinity of the lake, but it is a posted, private road. There is no public access to the lake.

Lake Manjo is entirely within the United States Geological Survey quadrangle of Center Moreland. It is also located near the community of Center Moreland.

The surficial geology immediately to the north of Lake Manjo mainly features bedrock consisting of sandstone and shale. To the south and west, however, the surficial geology consists of a till known as Wisconsinan Till. A small patch of Wisconsinan Ice-Contact Stratified Drift also occurs a short distance to the west of the lake.

== History and recreation ==
Lake Manjo was entered into the Geographic Names Information System on August 2, 1979. Its identifier in the Geographic Names Information System is 1199105. The lake was also historically known as Manjo Lake. It has existed since at least 1938.

There are at least two docks on Lake Manjo, one of which is 15 feet (4.6 m) long. The docks were built by 2010 by Eagle Scout David Novak and weigh more than 1,000 pounds (450 kg) apiece. The docks were intended to be multi-use.

A camp known as Camp Orchard Hill is located at Lake Manjo. In 2013, an Eagle Scout made improvements to the lake's waterfront area. These included constructing four benches, building ten mooring stations for boats, and improving the lake's docks.

== See also ==
- List of lakes in Pennsylvania
