= North Fork Reservoir =

Reservoir in North Carolina

Coordinates: 35°40′05″N 82°20′17″W

- Location: Black Mountain, North Carolina
- Type: Reservoir

North Fork Reservoir is a freshwater reservoir in Black Mountain, North Carolina, near Swannanoa. It was created by damming the north fork of the Swannanoa River to provide a source of water for Asheville, North Carolina. The city of Asheville purchased 5,000 acres of land in the North Fork Valley through eminent domain and flooded it to create the reservoir.
