= Nessmuk Lake =

- Lake Nessmuk
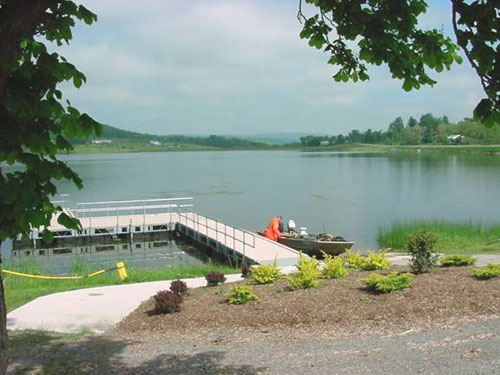
- A picture of Nessmuk Lake and a small fishing pier.

- Location within Pennsylvania Location within the United States
- Location: Tioga County, Pennsylvania
- Coordinates: 41°43′47″N 77°17′29″W
- Type: reservoir
- Basin countries: United States
- Surface area: 60 acres (24.3 ha)
- Surface elevation: 1,463 ft (446 m)

Nessmuk Lake, also known as Lake Nessmuk, is a reservoir located in Tioga County, Pennsylvania, near the borough of Wellsboro. The lake is owned by the Commonwealth of Pennsylvania and is managed by the Fish and Boat Commission for the public use of fishing and boating in the lake. The borough of Wellsboro is responsible for caring and maintaining the lake. Commonwealth Inland Waters regulations apply for all living fish due to its use as a warmwater fishery. Boating is limited to electric boats and unpowered boats.

Nessmuk Lake covers an area of 24.3 hectares (60 acres). The lake is located along PA route 287, one mile south of Wellsboro.
