= Meadow Grounds Lake =

Reservoir in Pennsylvania, United States

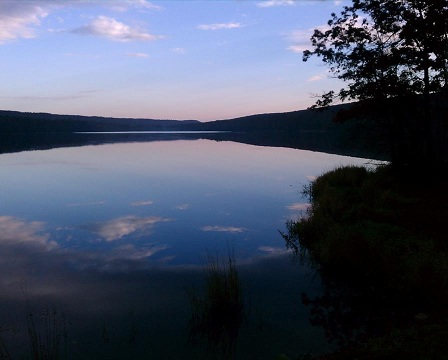
- Meadow Grounds Lake

- Location within Pennsylvania Location within the United States
- Location: Fulton County, Pennsylvania
- Coordinates: 39°55′26″N 78°03′28″W
- Primary inflows: Roaring Run
- Catchment area: 3.2 square miles (8.3 km^{2})
- Basin countries: United States
- Surface area: 204 acres (0.8 km^{2})
- Max. depth: 39 ft (11.9 m)
- Water volume: 3,130 acre⋅ft (3,860,000 m^{3})
- Surface elevation: 1,490 ft (454 m)
- Settlements: McConnellsburg

Meadow Grounds Lake was completed in June of 1964 and is a 204 acres (83 ha) reservoir located within State Game Lands 53 in Fulton County, Pennsylvania. The dam and lake areas are leased to the Pennsylvania Fish and Boat Commission (PFBC) by the Pennsylvania Game Commission. The dam was designed and built by the PFBC and construction of the dam was complete in June 1964. As the permit holder for the Meadow Grounds Dam the PFBC is responsible for its safe operation and maintenance. Meadow Grounds Dam is categorized by the Pennsylvania Department of Environmental Protection (PADEP) as a High Hazard (Category 1), size class B structure. The drainage area of the dam's watershed is 3.2 square miles (8.3 km^{2}) on Roaring Run. The zoned earth embankment creates a 204 acres (83 ha) reservoir and at normal pool stores 3,130 acre-feet (3,860,000 m^{3}) of water. A normal pool elevation of 1,495.3 feet (455.8 m) is maintained throughout the year via the principal and auxiliary spillways. The zoned earth fill dam is 39 feet (12 m) in height and 530 feet (160 m) long. The auxiliary spillway at Meadow Grounds Dam is a trapezoidal-shaped concrete chute cut into rock though a natural saddle about 200 feet (61 m) to the right of the dams right abutment. The spillway is provided with a 67 foot (20 m) long trapezoidal-shaped weir that discharges into a concrete lined stilling basin and then into a riprap lined earth channel.

The lake was drained in March 2013 after deficiencies were found in the dam. It was refilled in 2021 after a sustained community campaign.
