= Lions Lake =

Lake in the state of Wisconsin, United States

- Location within Wisconsin Location within the United States
- Location: Portage County, Wisconsin
- Coordinates: 44°38′49″N 89°17′24″W
- Type: lake
- Basin countries: United States
- Surface area: 45 acres (18 ha)
- Max. depth: 11 ft (3.4 m)
- Surface elevation: 1,132 ft (345 m)

Lions Lake is a lake in the U.S. state of Wisconsin.

Lions Lake was named in the 1950s after the Wisconsin Lions Foundation, which bought the property and established a lakeside summer camp. Lions Lake is a 45 acres (18 ha) lake located in Portage County. It has a maximum depth of 11 feet (3.4 m). Fish include Panfish, Largemouth Bass and Northern Pike.
