= Eaton Reservoir =

- Location within New York
- Location: Madison County, New York, United States
- Coordinates: 42°51′39.1″N 75°41′57.2″W
- Type: Reservoir
- Primary outflows: Eaton Brook
- Basin countries: United States
- Surface area: 247 acres (1.00 km^{2})
- Average depth: 21 feet (6.4 m)
- Max. depth: 52 ft (16 m)
- Shore length^{1}: 5.6 miles (9.0 km)
- Surface elevation: 1,430 ft (440 m)
- Settlements: Erieville, New York
- ^{1} Shore length is not a well-defined measure.

Eaton Reservoir also called Eaton Brook Reservoir is a man-made lake located by Erieville, New York. Fish species present in the lake include pumpkinseed sunfish, walleye, smallmouth bass, yellow perch, bluegill, pickerel, rock bass, rainbow trout, and largemouth bass.
