= Whipple Lake =

Lake in the state of Minnesota, United States

- Location within Minnesota
- Location: Clearwater County, Minnesota
- Coordinates: 47°10′1″N 95°13′55″W
- Type: lake

Whipple Lake is a lake in Clearwater County, Minnesota, in the United States.

Whipple Lake was named for Henry Benjamin Whipple, an Episcopal bishop who worked closely with Ojibwe and Sioux Indians.

== See also ==
- List of lakes in Minnesota
