= Tuscarora Lake =

- Location within New York Location within the United States
- Location: Madison County, New York, United States
- Coordinates: 42°52′02″N 75°45′24″W
- Type: Lake
- Basin countries: United States
- Surface area: 313 acres (1.27 km^{2})
- Average depth: 21 feet (6.4 m)
- Max. depth: 42 ft (13 m)
- Shore length^{1}: 3.7 miles (6.0 km)
- Surface elevation: 1,499 ft (457 m)
- Islands: 2
- Settlements: Erieville, New York
- ^{1} Shore length is not a well-defined measure.

Tuscarora Lake, also called Erieville Reservoir, is located near Erieville, New York. The lake was created in 1850 as a feeder for the Erie Canal and is still used as a feeder for the canal. Tuscarora Lake is the highest reservoir in New York State. The lake is stocked with fish each year with funds that are provided by donations and proceeds from the ice-fishing derby. Fish species that are present in the lake include pumpkinseed sunfish, walleye, and largemouth bass.
