= Tunkhannock Township, Wyoming County, Pennsylvania =

Township in Pennsylvania, US

Tunkhannock Township
- Township
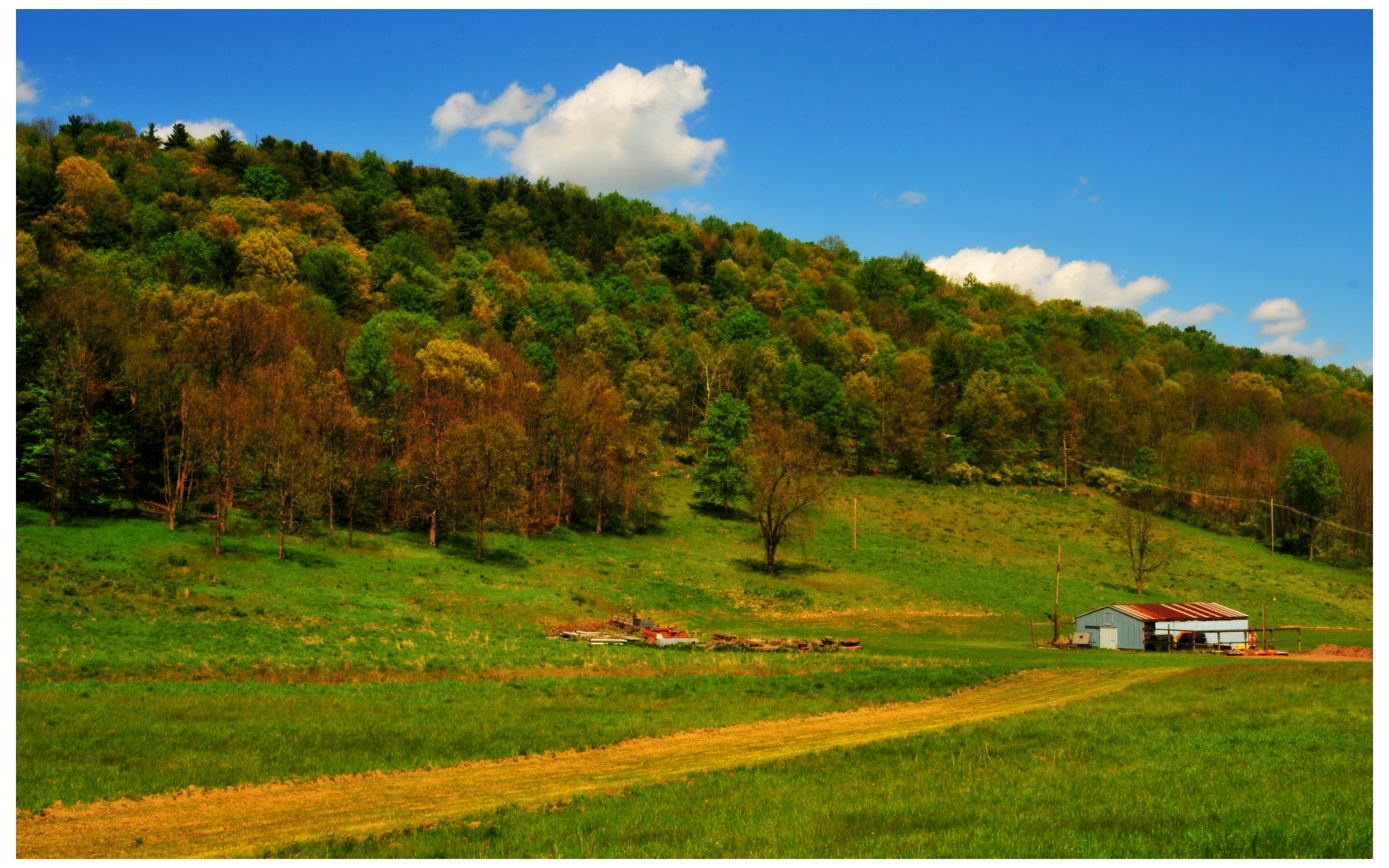
- Farm in Tunkhannock Township

- Location of Pennsylvania in the United States

- Location of Tunkhannock Township in Pennsylvania
- Coordinates: 41°33′00″N 75°51′59″W
- Country: United States
- State: Pennsylvania
- County: Wyoming

Area
  - Total: 31.50 sq mi (81.58 km^{2})
  - Land: 30.64 sq mi (79.37 km^{2})
  - Water: 0.85 sq mi (2.21 km^{2})
- Elevation: 958 ft (292 m)

Population (2020)
  - Total: 3,976 ▼
  - Estimate (2021): 3,969
  - Density: 139.6/sq mi (53.91/km^{2})
- Time zone: UTC-5 (EST)
  - Summer (DST): UTC-4 (EDT)
- Area code: 570
- FIPS code: 42-131-77792
- Website: https://tunkhannocktwp.org/

Tunkhannock Township is a township in Wyoming County, Pennsylvania, United States. The population was 3,976 at the 2020 census.

== Geography ==
According to the United States Census Bureau, the township has a total area of 32.0 square miles (82.9 km^{2}), of which 31.1 square miles (80.6 km^{2}) is land and 0.9 square mile (2.3 km^{2}) (2.75%) is water.

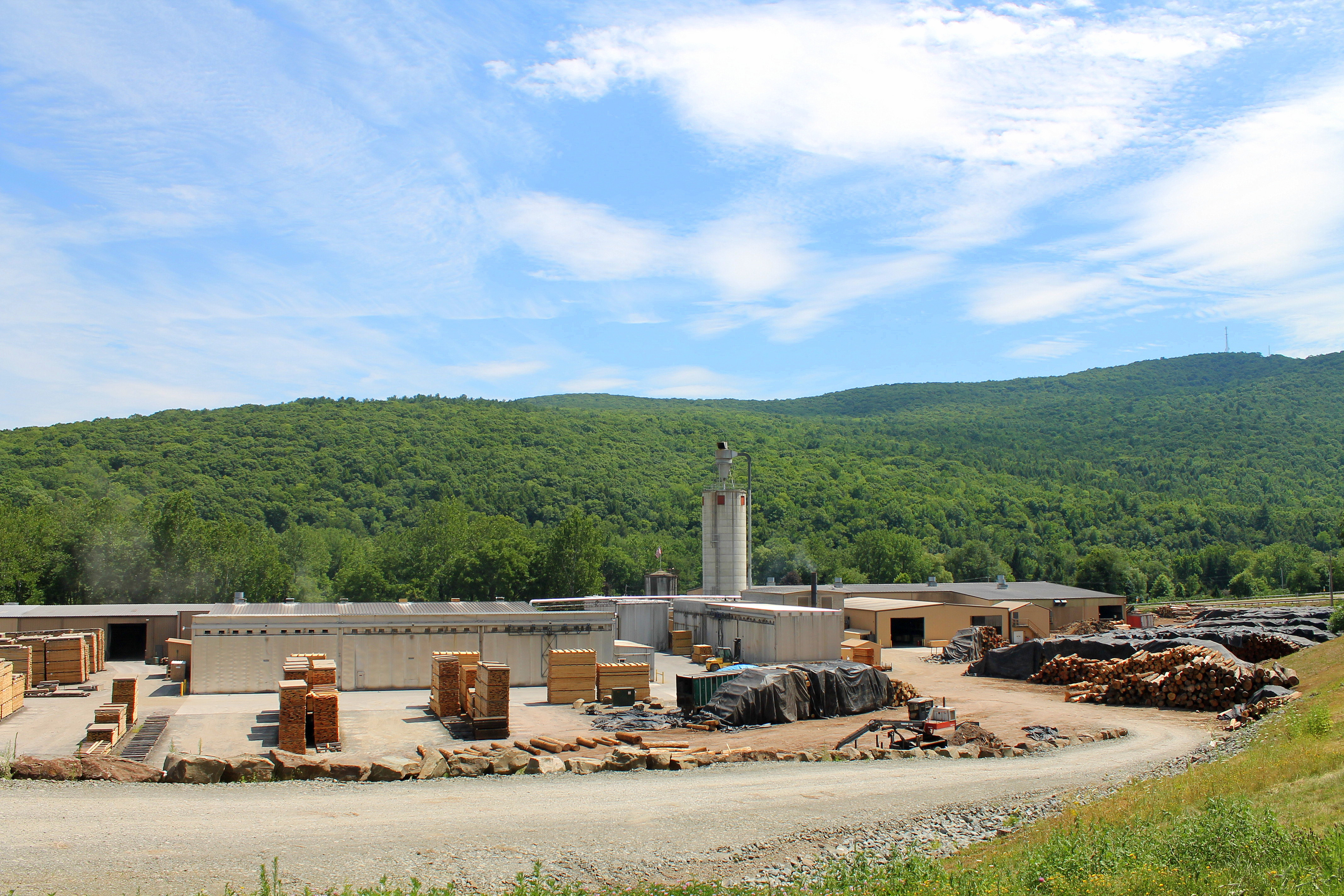
Deerpark Lumber Mill in Tunkhannock Township in July 2016

== Demographics ==
Historical population
Census	Pop.	Note	%±
2010	4,273		—
2020	3,976		−7.0%
2021 (est.)	3,969		−0.2%
U.S. Decennial Census

As of the census of 2000, there were 4,298 people, 1,624 households, and 1,216 families residing in the township. The population density was 138.2 inhabitants per square mile (53.4/km^{2}). There were 1,822 housing units at an average density of 58.6 per square mile (22.6/km^{2}). The racial makeup of the township was 98.26% White, 0.44% African American, 0.14% Native American, 0.37% Asian, 0.02% Pacific Islander, 0.21% from other races, and 0.56% from two or more races. Hispanic or Latino of any race were 0.77% of the population.

There were 1,624 households, out of which 33.3% had children under the age of 18 living with them, 62.7% were married couples living together, 8.0% had a female householder with no husband present, and 25.1% were non-families. 20.7% of all households were made up of individuals, and 7.1% had someone living alone who was 65 years of age or older. The average household size was 2.57 and the average family size was 2.98.

In the township the population was spread out, with 24.6% under the age of 18, 6.5% from 18 to 24, 27.9% from 25 to 44, 26.9% from 45 to 64, and 14.1% who were 65 years of age or older. The median age was 40 years. For every 100 females, there were 95.0 males. For every 100 females age 18 and over, there were 93.6 males.

The median income for a household in the township was $38,974, and the median income for a family was $42,459. Males had a median income of $35,871 versus $25,398 for females. The per capita income for the township was $18,384. About 6.7% of families and 9.1% of the population were below the poverty line, including 12.6% of those under age 18 and 7.3% of those age 65 or over.
