= National Register of Historic Places listings in Polk County, North Carolina =

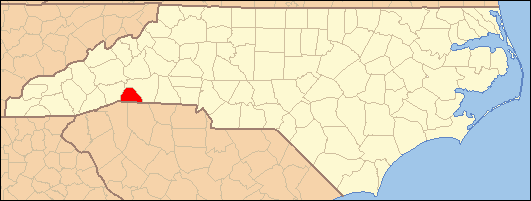

This list includes properties and districts listed on the National Register of Historic Places in Polk County, North Carolina. Click the "Map of all coordinates" link to the right to view an online map of all properties and districts with latitude and longitude coordinates in the table below.

== Current listings ==
This National Park Service list is complete through NPS recent listings posted July 10, 2026.

	Name on the Register	Image	Date listed	Location	City or town	Description
1	Bank of Tryon Building	Bank of Tryon Building	January 17, 2008 (#07001408)	16 N. Trade St. 35°12′33″N 82°14′22″W	Tryon	
2	Blackberry Hill		November 21, 1974 (#74001372)	East of Tryon on SR 1516; 35°12′28″N 82°12′04″W	Tryon	
3	Blockhouse Site	Blockhouse Site	October 15, 1970 (#70000466)	East of U.S. Route 176; 35°11′47″N 82°13′04″W	Tryon	
4	Charlton Leland	Charlton Leland	April 5, 2006 (#06000225)	229 Greenville St. 35°14′00″N 82°21′05″W	Saluda	
5	Church of the Transfiguration	Church of the Transfiguration	November 12, 1982 (#82001301)	Henderson and Charles Sts. 35°14′12″N 82°20′48″W	Saluda	
6	The Cotton Patch		May 25, 2021 (#100006462)	426 South River Rd. 35°12′48″N 82°12′13″W	Tryon vicinity	The main house, a non-contributing property, was demolished in 2022.
7	Downtown Tryon Historic District	Downtown Tryon Historic District	December 15, 2015 (#15000900)	Both sides of N. & S. Trade Sts., RR. right-of-way between 98 N. & 55 S. Trade Sts. 35°12′32″N 82°14′19″W	Tryon	
8	Friendly Hills		June 26, 1998 (#98000731)	140 Country Club Rd. 35°13′13″N 82°15′01″W	Tryon	
9	Green River Plantation	Green River Plantation	March 28, 1974 (#74001370)	East of Columbus off SR 1005; 35°17′12″N 82°01′06″W	Columbus	
10	J. G. Hughes House	J. G. Hughes House	May 5, 1989 (#89000347)	N. Peak St. 35°15′14″N 82°11′59″W	Columbus	
11	John Hiram Johnson House		February 7, 1994 (#94000005)	Address Restricted	Saluda	
12	Rev. Joshua D. Jones House	Rev. Joshua D. Jones House	September 26, 1991 (#91001476)	NC 1526 south side, 0.4 miles (0.64 km) from NC 108; 35°17′24″N 82°09′51″W	Mill Spring	
13	Lynncote	Lynncote	August 30, 2010 (#10000604)	3318 Lynn Rd. 35°12′51″N 82°14′29″W	Tryon	
14	Lynncote Historic District	Lynncote Historic District	July 28, 2022 (#100007969)	3316-3525 Lynn and 39 Wilderness Rds. 35°12′51″N 82°14′29″W	Tryon	
15	Mill Farm Inn	Mill Farm Inn	January 22, 2009 (#08001366)	701 Harmon Field Rd. 35°13′24″N 82°14′52″W	Tryon	
16	Mills-Screven Plantation	Mills-Screven Plantation	February 17, 1983 (#83001904)	Northeast of Tryon on SR 1509; 35°13′04″N 82°13′33″W	Tryon	
17	Pine Crest Inn	Pine Crest Inn	April 15, 1982 (#82003500)	Pine Crest Lane; 35°12′31″N 82°14′02″W	Tryon	
18	Polk County Courthouse	Polk County Courthouse	November 8, 1974 (#74001371)	Courthouse St. 35°15′05″N 82°11′54″W	Columbus	
19	Railway Clerks' Mountain House	Railway Clerks' Mountain House	July 28, 2000 (#00000842)	100 Orchard Inn Lane (U.S. Route 176, 0.6 miles (0.97 km) southeast of the junction with Ozone Rd.); 35°13′50″N 82°20′10″W	Saluda	
20	Ryder Hall	Ryder Hall	September 15, 2005 (#05001033)	305 Seminary St. 35°14′14″N 82°20′35″W	Saluda	
21	Saluda Main Street Historic District	Saluda Main Street Historic District	May 29, 1996 (#96000569)	Main St. from Cullipher St. to Carolina St. 35°14′10″N 82°20′54″W	Saluda	
22	Seven Hearths	Seven Hearths	March 26, 1976 (#76001333)	North of Tryon at junction of U.S. Route 176 and Harmon Field Rd. 35°13′20″N 82°15′04″W	Tryon	
24	Stone Hedge	Stone Hedge	April 21, 2015 (#15000166)	222 Stone Hedge Ln. 35°14′41″N 82°14′52″W	Tryon	
25	Sunnydale	Sunnydale	December 7, 2011 (#11000890)	334 S. Trade St. 35°12′15″N 82°14′16″W	Tryon	
26	Tryon Country Club	Tryon Country Club	February 5, 2013 (#12001262)	393 Country Club Rd. 35°13′07″N 82°15′16″W	Tryon	
23	Nina Simone Birthplace	Nina Simone Birthplace	May 18, 2023 (#100007967)	30 East Livingston St. 35°12′50″N 82°13′56″W	Tryon	

== See also ==
- National Register of Historic Places listings in North Carolina
- List of National Historic Landmarks in North Carolina
