= Sunnydale (disambiguation) =

Sunnydale is the fictional setting for the TV series Buffy the Vampire Slayer .

Sunnydale may also refer to:

== Places ==
- Sunnydale, Kansas, U.S.
- Sunnydale, Washington, U.S.
- Sunnydale Projects, Visitacion Valley, San Francisco, California, U.S.
  - Sunnydale station
- Sunnydale, Cape Town, South Africa

== Other uses ==
- Sunnydale (Tryon, North Carolina), U.S., a historic building

== See also ==
- Sunnidale (disambiguation)
- Sunnyvale (disambiguation)
- Sunningdale, a village in Berkshire, England
