= Church of the Transfiguration (Saluda, North Carolina) =

Historic church in North Carolina, United States

- U.S. National Register of Historic Places
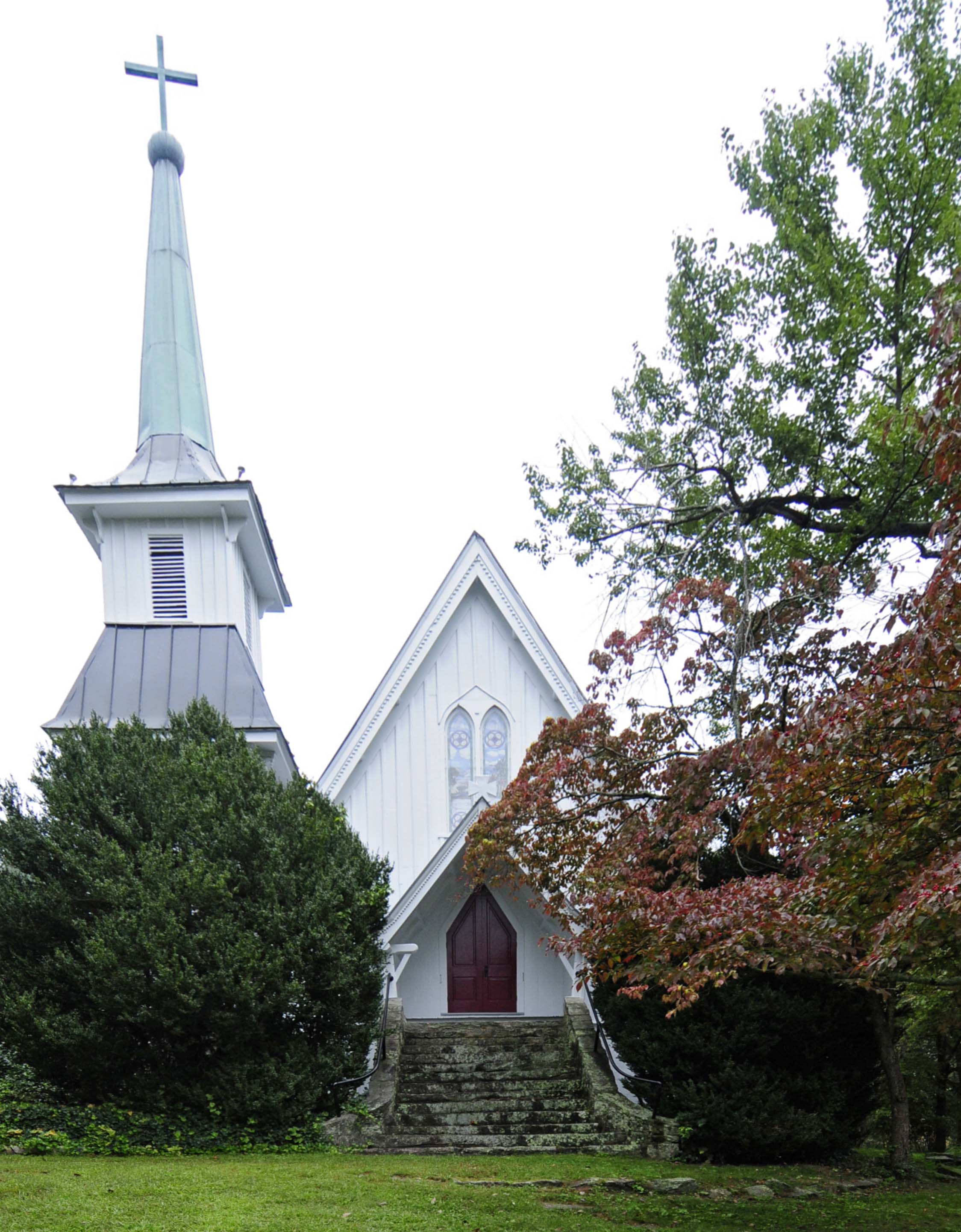

- Location within North Carolina Location within the United States
- Location: Henderson and Charles Sts., Saluda, North Carolina
- Coordinates: 35°14′12″N 82°20′48″W
- Area: 1.7 acres (0.69 ha)
- Built: 1889
- Architect: McCullough, The Rev. John DeWitt
- Architectural style: Gothic, Carpenter Gothic
- NRHP reference No.: 82001301
- Added to NRHP: November 12, 1982

Church of the Transfiguration is a historic Episcopal church located at Henderson and Charles Streets in Saluda, Polk County, North Carolina. It is a parish of the Episcopal Diocese of Western North Carolina. The church reported 139 members in 2018 and 159 members in 2023; no membership statistics were reported in 2024 parochial reports. Plate and pledge income reported for the congregation in 2024 was $274,964. Average Sunday attendance (ASA) in 2024 was 73 persons.

The church was built in 1889, and it is a one-story Carpenter Gothic-style church with a steeply pitched gable roof and board and batten siding. It features a two-tiered square corner bell tower and pointed arch stained glass windows. A vestry addition was built in 1968. It was added to the National Register of Historic Places in 1982.
