= Ryder Hall =

- U.S. National Register of Historic Places
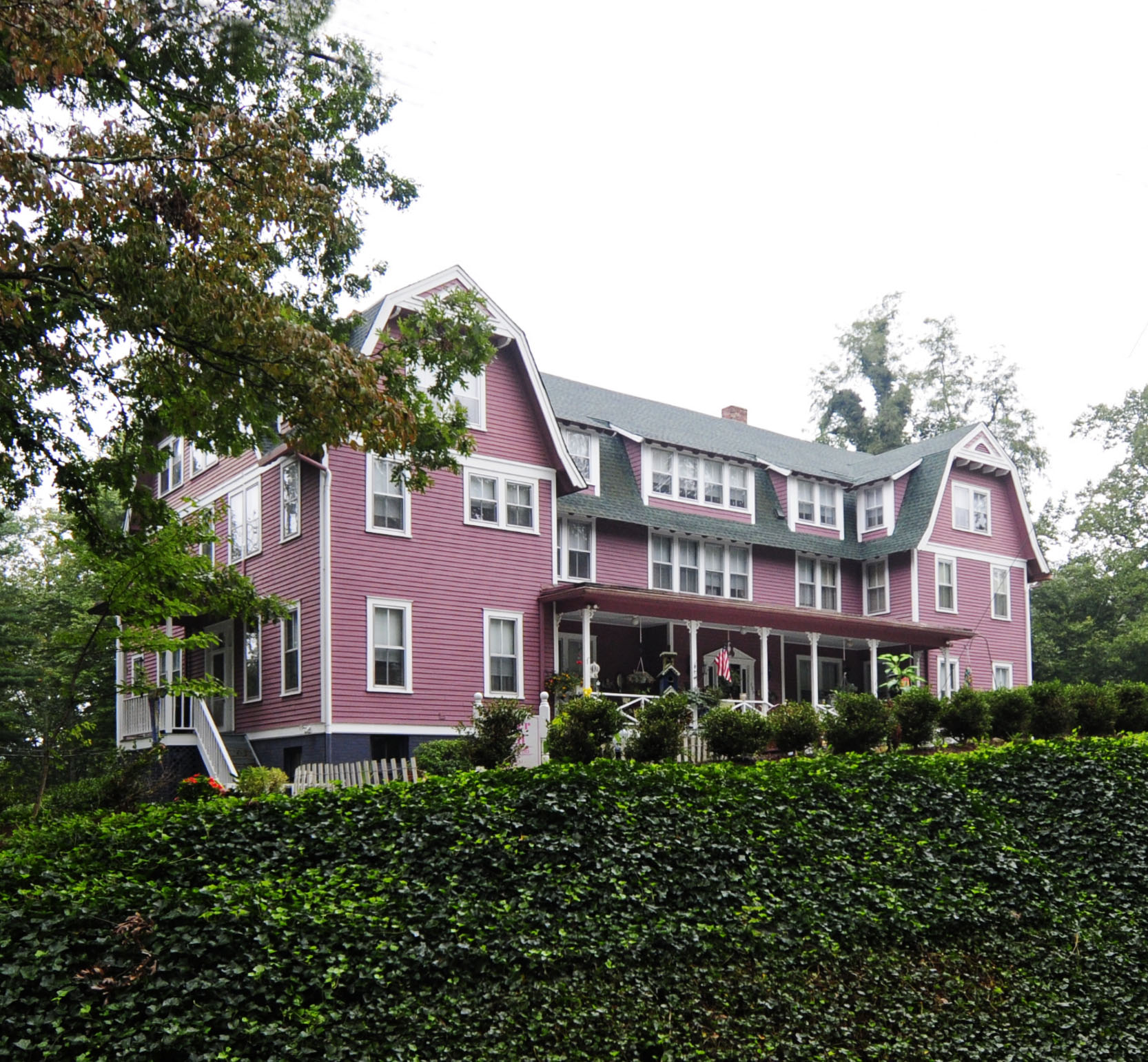
- Ryder Hall, September 2012

- Location within North Carolina Location within the United States
- Location: 305 Seminary St., Saluda, North Carolina
- Coordinates: 35°14′14″N 82°20′35″W
- Area: 2.2 acres (0.89 ha)
- Built: 1909
- Architect: Thompson, William L.
- Architectural style: Colonial Revival
- NRHP reference No.: 05001033
- Added to NRHP: September 15, 2005

Ryder Hall, also known as the Mountain Manor Hotel and Cloud Hotel, is a historic hotel located at Saluda, Polk County, North Carolina. It was built in 1909, as a girls' dormitory for the Saluda Seminary that operated until 1922. It is a 2 1/2-story, "H"-plan, Colonial Revival style frame building sheathed in weatherboard. It has a gambrel roof with shed-roof dormers and features full-width one-story shed roof porches on the front and rear elevations. It housed a public school until 1927, then was converted to a hotel. It was converted to a single-family dwelling after 1992.

It was added to the National Register of Historic Places in 2005.
