= John Hiram Johnson House =

Historic house in North Carolina, United States

- U.S. National Register of Historic Places
- Nearest city: Saluda, North Carolina
- Area: 9 acres (3.6 ha)
- Built: 1887
- Architectural style: 1-story Quaker plan
- NRHP reference No.: 94000005
- Added to NRHP: February 7, 1994

John Hiram Johnson House is a historic home located near Saluda, Polk County, North Carolina. It was built about 1887, and is a small, one-story, Quaker plan frame dwelling, sheathed in weatherboard and on a stacked fieldstone foundation. It has a full-facade front porch and a rear ell and shed addition. Also on the property are the contributing log smokehouse (c. 1935) and frame barn (c. 1935). It is representative of a late-19th century vernacular subsistence dwelling.

It was added to the National Register of Historic Places in 1994.
