= Pearson's Falls =

Waterfall in North Carolina, United States

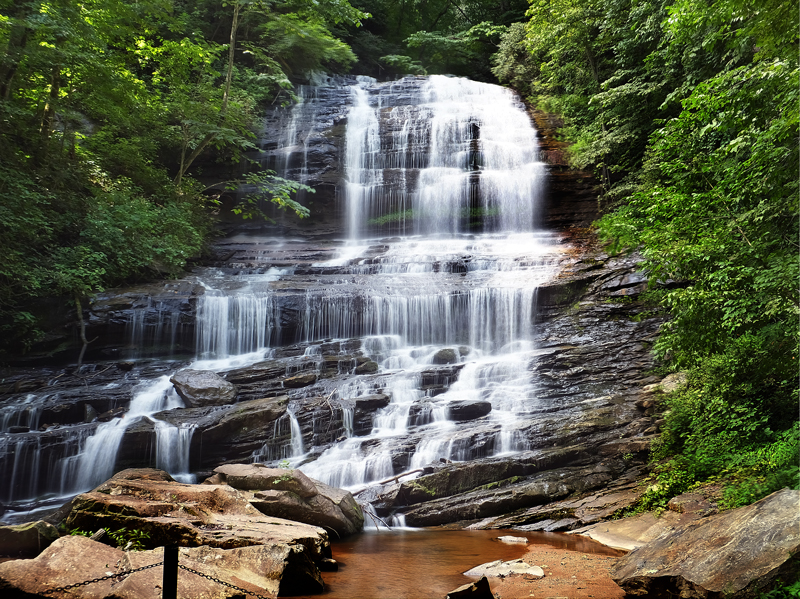
- Pearson's Falls

- Location within North Carolina
- Location: Polk County, North Carolina
- Nearest city: Saluda, North Carolina
- Coordinates: 35°13′09″N 82°19′56″W
- Governing body: Tryon Garden Club
- Website: www.pearsonsfalls.org

Pearson's Falls is located in the foothills of western North Carolina off Hwy. 176 between Tryon and Saluda. This wildlife and bird sanctuary comprises 268 acres (108 ha) of native forest, granite, spring-fed streams and a moderate 1/4 mile trail to a 90-foot (27 m) waterfall. There are over 200 species of rare wildflowers and plants. There are also mosses, lichens, shrubs and trees in this glen, which is classified as a deciduous climax forest. Pearson's Falls is owned and maintained by The Tryon Garden Club, a non-profit 501 (c)(3) organization.

Pearson's Falls was named for a young engineer, Charles William Pearson, who scouted the mountains for what was to become the Southern Railroad. A military man, farmer, and an engineer, Captain Pearson bought the Glen as part of a large tract of land that he wanted for his family.

In 1931, the Tryon Garden Club bought the property in order to preserve this unique mountain Glen. Although open to the public, the property remains under the ownership and protection of the Tryon Garden Club. Over 17,000 people visit Pearson's Falls each year.

Pearson's Falls is a wildflower and wildlife preserve and an outdoor laboratory for botany and biology students from the surrounding colleges and universities, and the site of frequent field trips for local science classes.

Pearson's Falls is designated as a North Carolina National Heritage Site of the Blue Ridge National Heritage Area, a North Carolina Birding Trail Site, and is placed in the Smithsonian Institution Archives of American Gardens.

The botanical preserve is made up of spring-fed streams and 268 acres (108 ha) of native forest. In addition, the wildlife preserve features more than 200 species of fern, algae, flowering plants, and mosses.

The waterfall's water source is Colt Creek, and the trail leading up to the waterfall is roughly three-tenths of a mile. Using a scale of 0–10, with 0 being easy and 10 being very difficult, the difficulty of the trail is listed as a 3. The waterfall is not wheelchair accessible. The waterfall is not dog friendly. Only service animals are allowed.

== See also ==
- List of waterfalls
- List of waterfalls in North Carolina
