= Charlton Leland =

Historic house in North Carolina, United States

- U.S. National Register of Historic Places
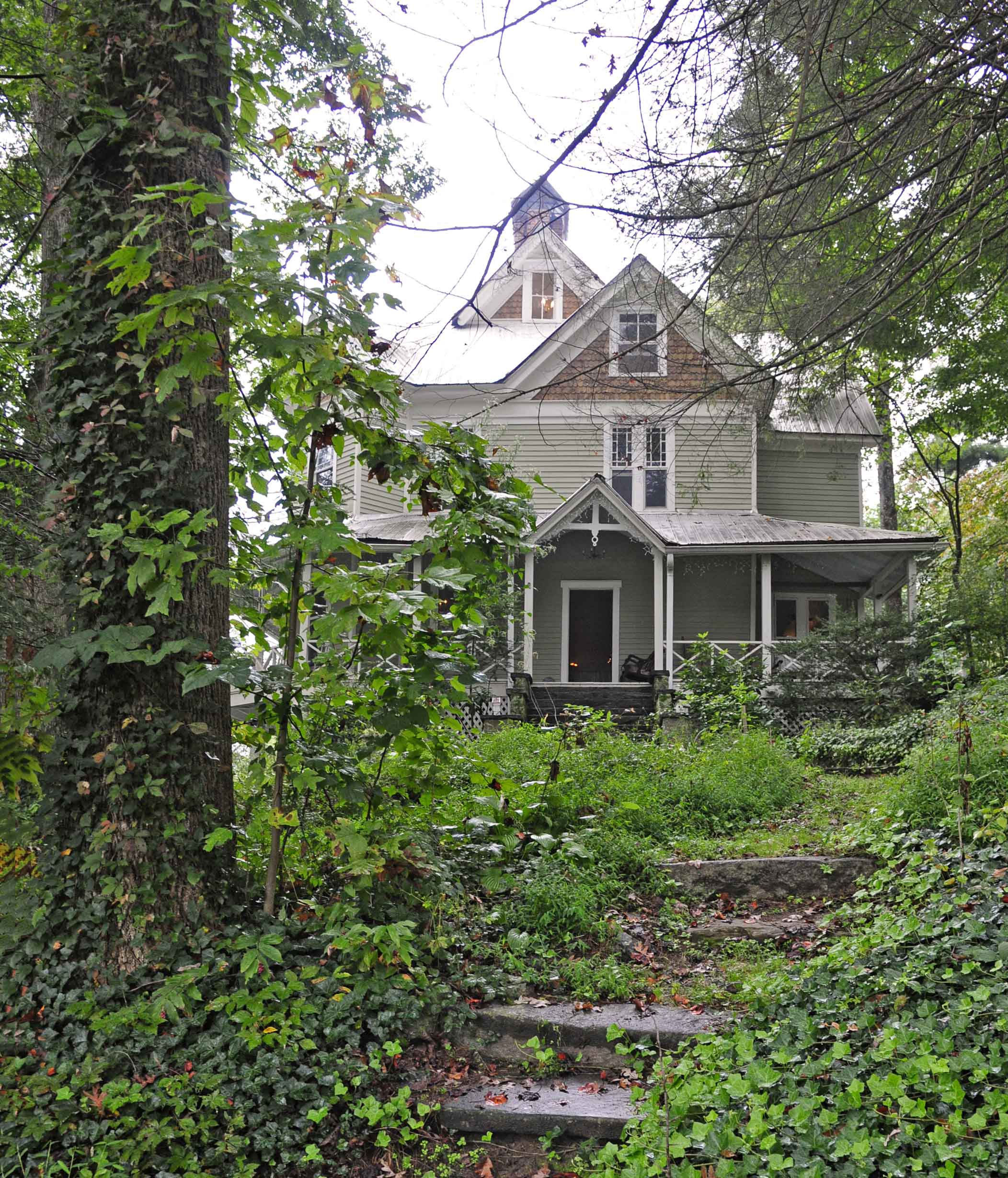
- Charlton Leland, September 2012

- Location within North Carolina Location within the United States
- Location: 229 Greenville St., Saluda, North Carolina
- Coordinates: 35°14′0″N 82°21′5″W
- Area: 1.7 acres (0.69 ha)
- Built: c. 1896, 1914
- Built by: Luther Thompson
- Architectural style: Queen Anne, Colonial Revival
- NRHP reference No.: 06000225
- Added to NRHP: April 5, 2006

Charlton Leland, also known as the Dr. E.B Goelet House and Saluda Inn, is a historic home located at Saluda, Polk County, North Carolina. It was built about 1896, as a 2 1/2-story, Queen Anne style frame dwelling with a wraparound porch. It was enlarged and remodeled in the Colonial Revival style when converted to an inn in 1914. It rests on an ashlar-face stone foundation and is capped by a gable-on-hip roof with a prominent front gable. The building houses a retreat house known as the Saluda Inn.

It was added to the National Register of Historic Places in 2006.
