= Mountain Home micropolitan area =

The Mountain Home micropolitan area may refer to:

- The Mountain Home, Arkansas micropolitan area, United States
- The Mountain Home, Idaho micropolitan area, United States

== See also ==
- Mountain Home (disambiguation)
