= Mountain House =

Mountain House may refer to:

== Cities and towns ==
- Mountain House, California, a city in San Joaquin County, California
- Mountain House, Alameda County, California
- Brush Creek, California, a community in Butte County, formerly known as Mountain House

== Buildings ==
=== Australia ===
- Mountain House, Wingen, a heritage-listed house in New South Wales

=== United States ===
(by state, then city)

- Mountain House, Kern County, California, a stage station of the Butterfield Overland Mail
- The Mountain House, Woodside, California, restaurant
- Eagle Mountain House, Jackson, New Hampshire, listed on the National Register of Historic Places (NRHP) in Carroll County, New Hampshire
- Blue Mountain House Annex, Blue Mountain, New York, NRHP-listed
- Conklin Mountain House, Olean, New York, NRHP-listed
- Mohonk Mountain House, New Paltz, New York, NRHP-listed
- Railway Clerks' Mountain House, Saluda, North Carolina, listed on the NRHP in Polk County, North Carolina
- Mountain House (Chillicothe, Ohio), NRHP-listed
- Miller's Mountain House, Roseburg, Oregon, listed on the NRHP in Douglas County, Oregon
- Mountain House (Ashland, Oregon), listed on the NRHP in Jackson County, Oregon
- Schoonover Mountain House, Bushkill, Pennsylvania, listed on the NRHP in Pike County, Pennsylvania

== Other Uses ==
- Camp Mountain House, a Girl Scout Camp in Pine Grove, Pennsylvania

== See also ==
- House Mountain (disambiguation)
- Mountain Home (disambiguation)
