= Saluda Main Street Historic District =

Historic district in North Carolina, United States

- U.S. National Register of Historic Places
- U.S. Historic district
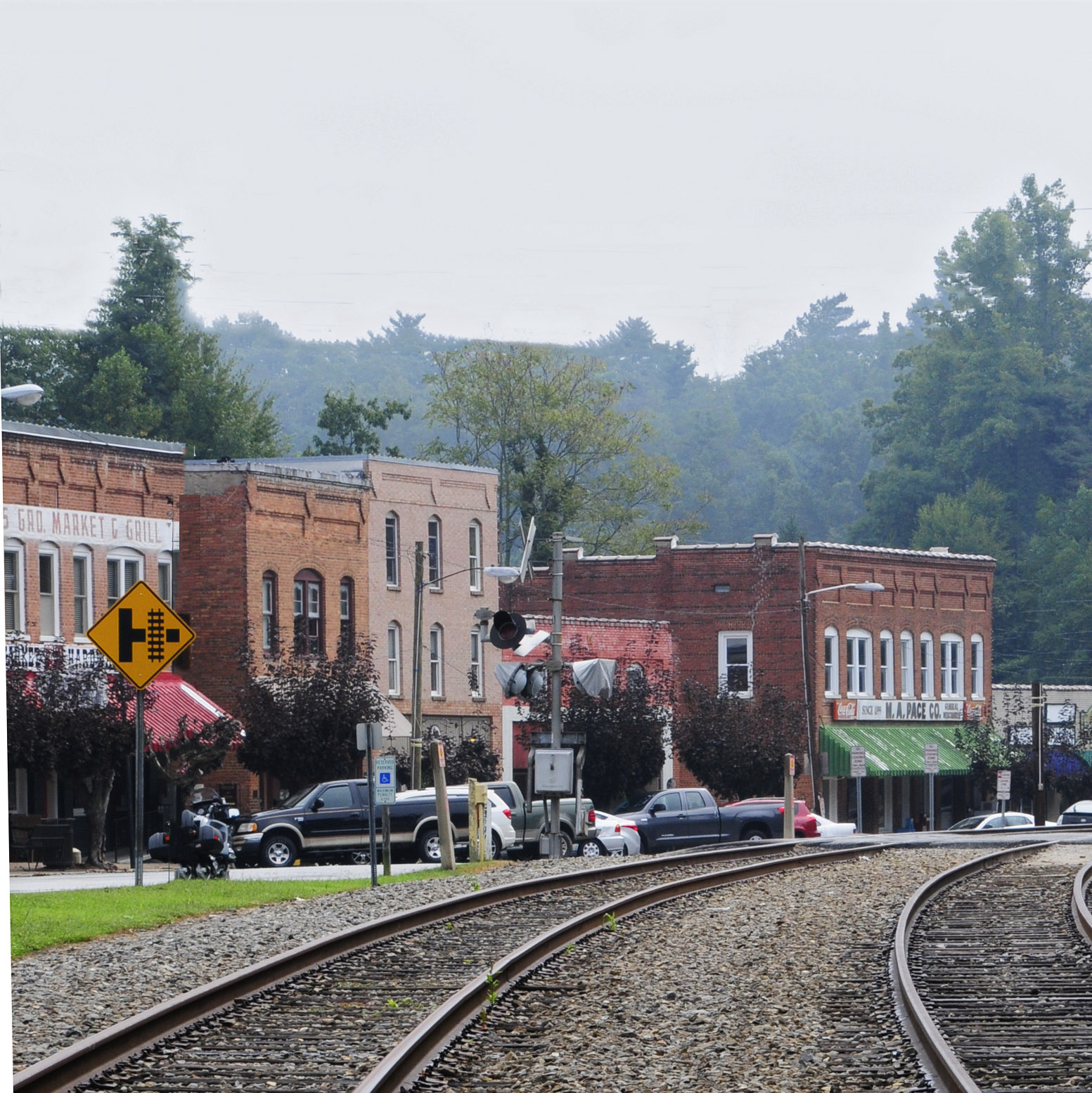
- Saluda Main Street Historic District, September 2012

- Location within North Carolina Location within the United States
- Location: Main St. from Cullipher St. to Carolina St., Saluda, North Carolina
- Coordinates: 35°14′10″N 82°20′54″W
- Area: 5.2 acres (2.1 ha)
- Built: 1878
- Architectural style: Late Gothic Revival, Stick/eastlake, Early Commercial
- NRHP reference No.: 96000569
- Added to NRHP: May 29, 1996

Saluda Main Street Historic District is a national historic district located at Saluda, Polk County, North Carolina. The district encompasses 16 contributing buildings, 1 contributing site, and 1 contributing structure in the central business district of Saluda. It includes buildings dated from about 1878 to 1946 and notable examples of Late Gothic Revival and Stick style / Eastlake movement architecture. Notable buildings include the Saluda Presbyterian Church (1895–1896), former Saluda Depot (c. 1900–1910), the Saluda City Hall (1896–1907), the M. A. Pace Store (1905–1910), Thompson's Store (1905–1910), Pebbledash Building (1911–1916), Top Service Station (1930s), and the former United States Post Office (c. 1910).

It was listed on the National Register of Historic Places in 1996.

== Gallery ==
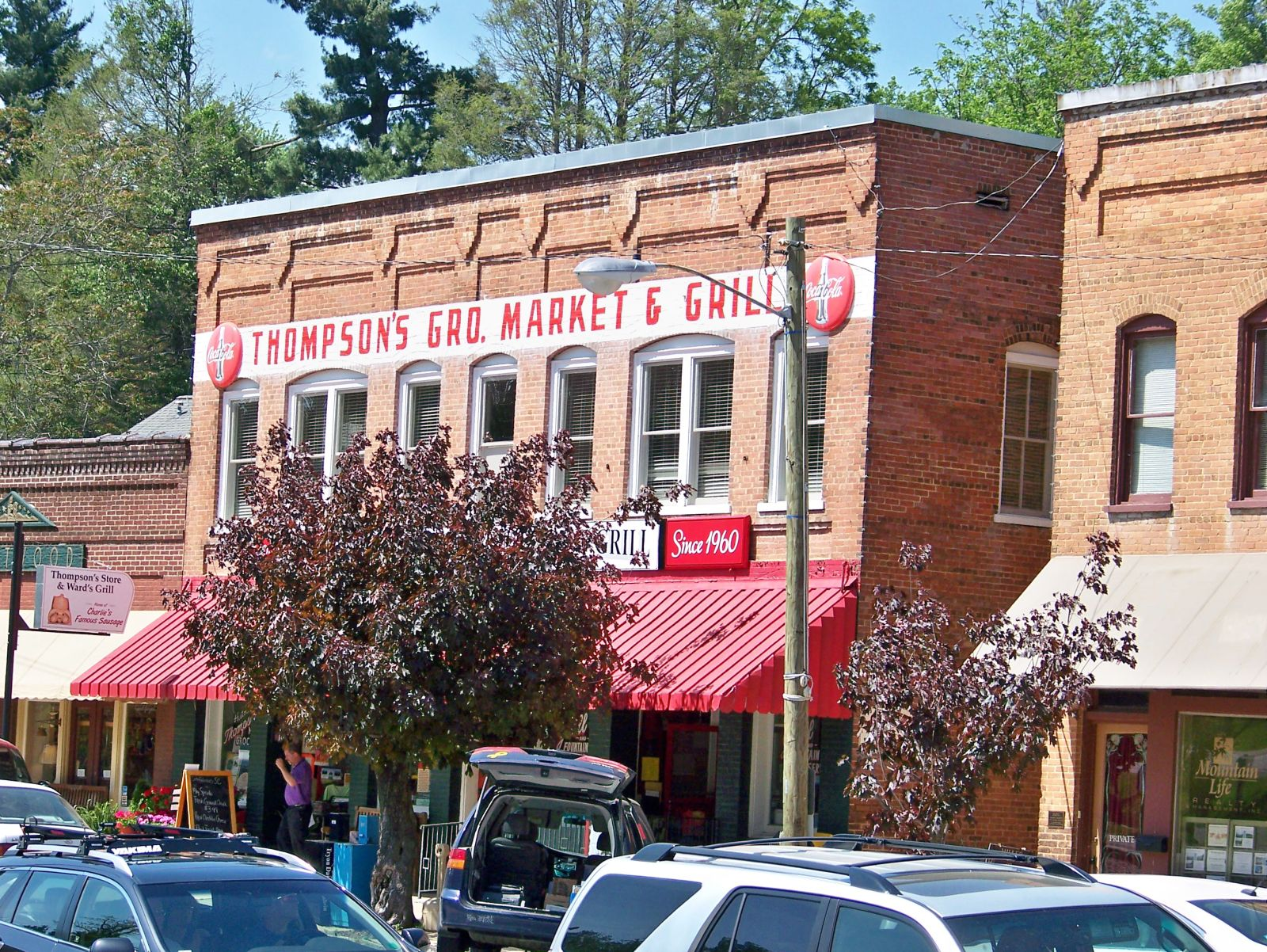
Thompson's Grocery Market

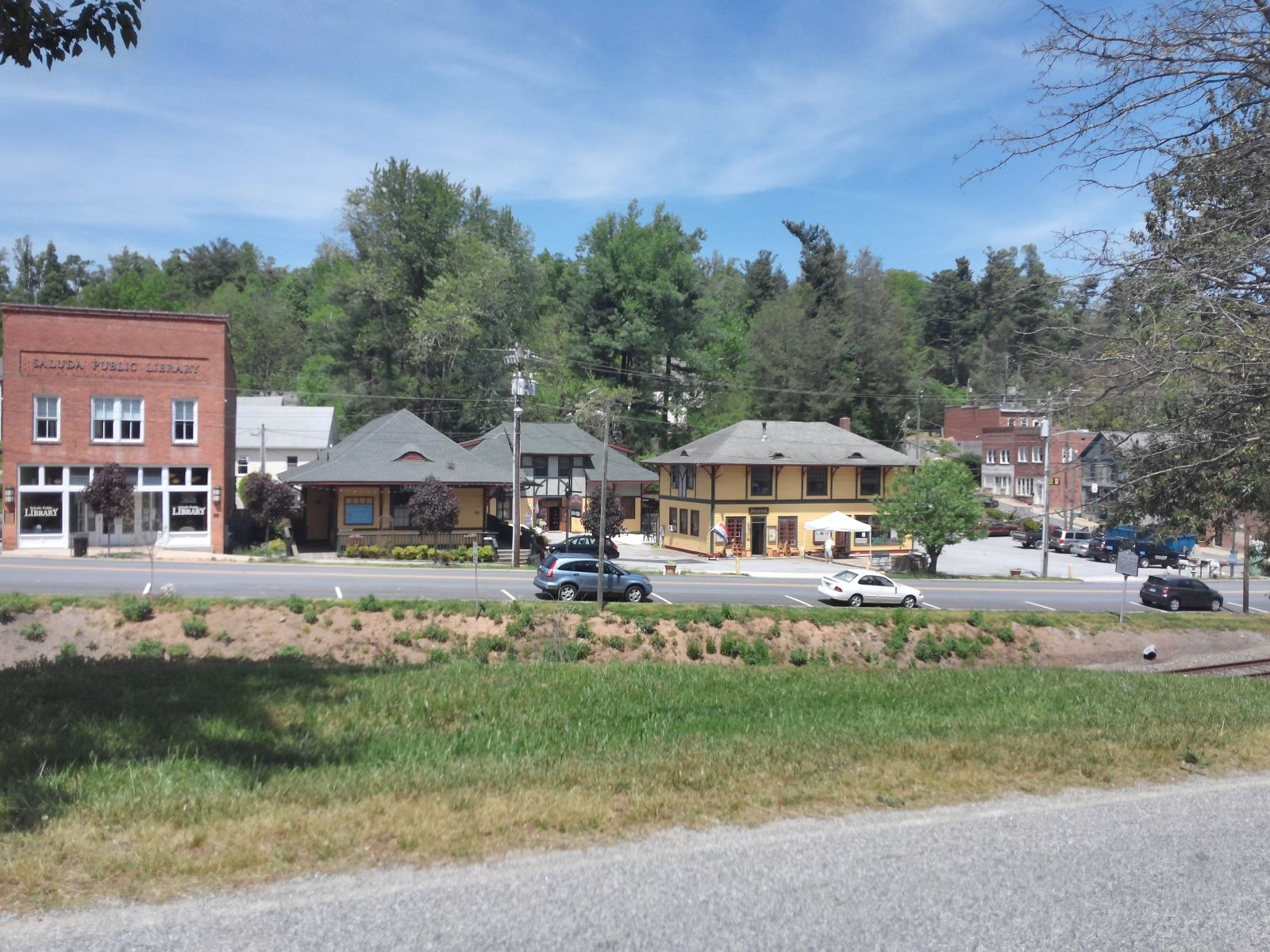
Saluda Library and Old Rail Depot

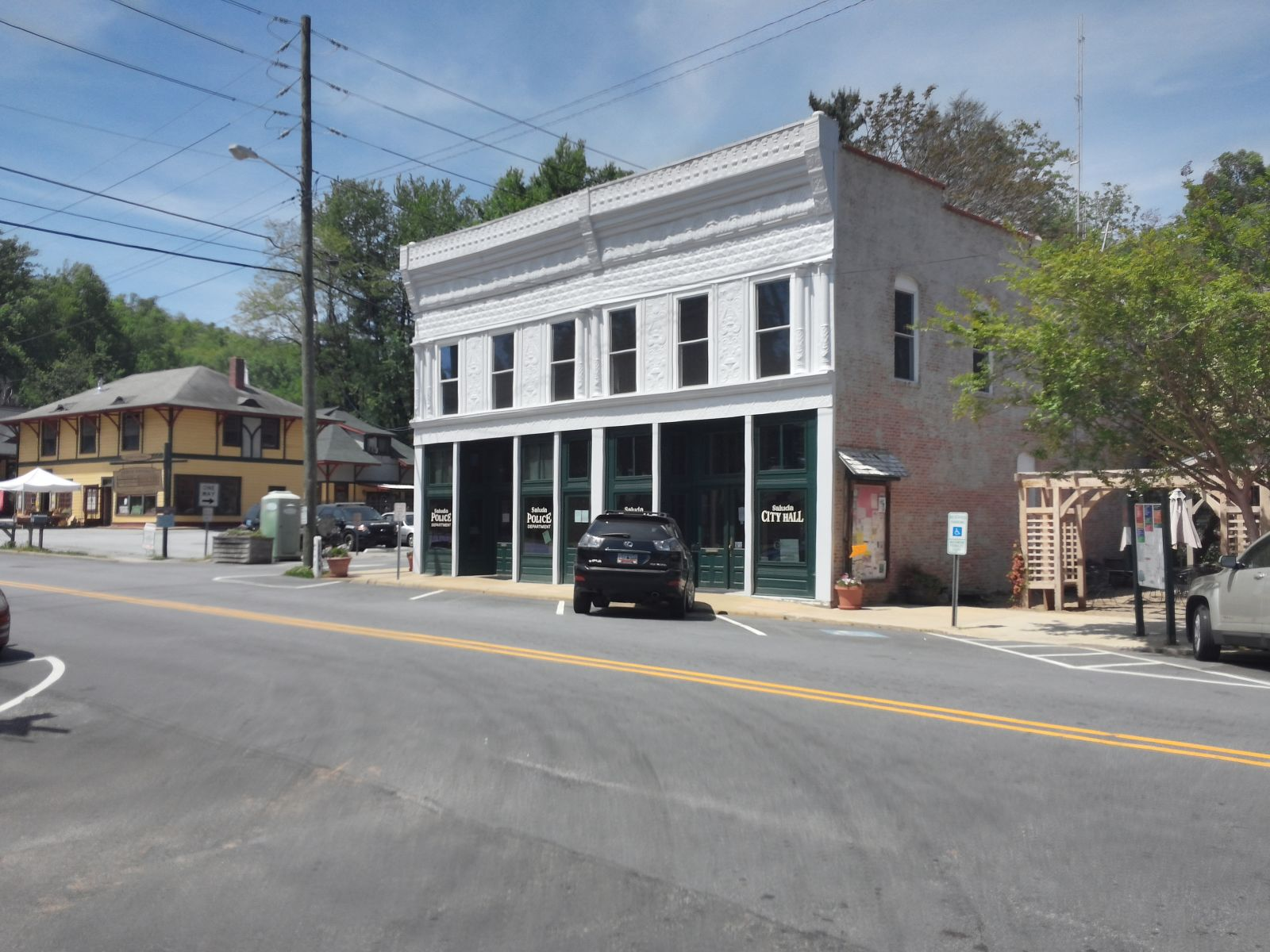
Saluda City Hall

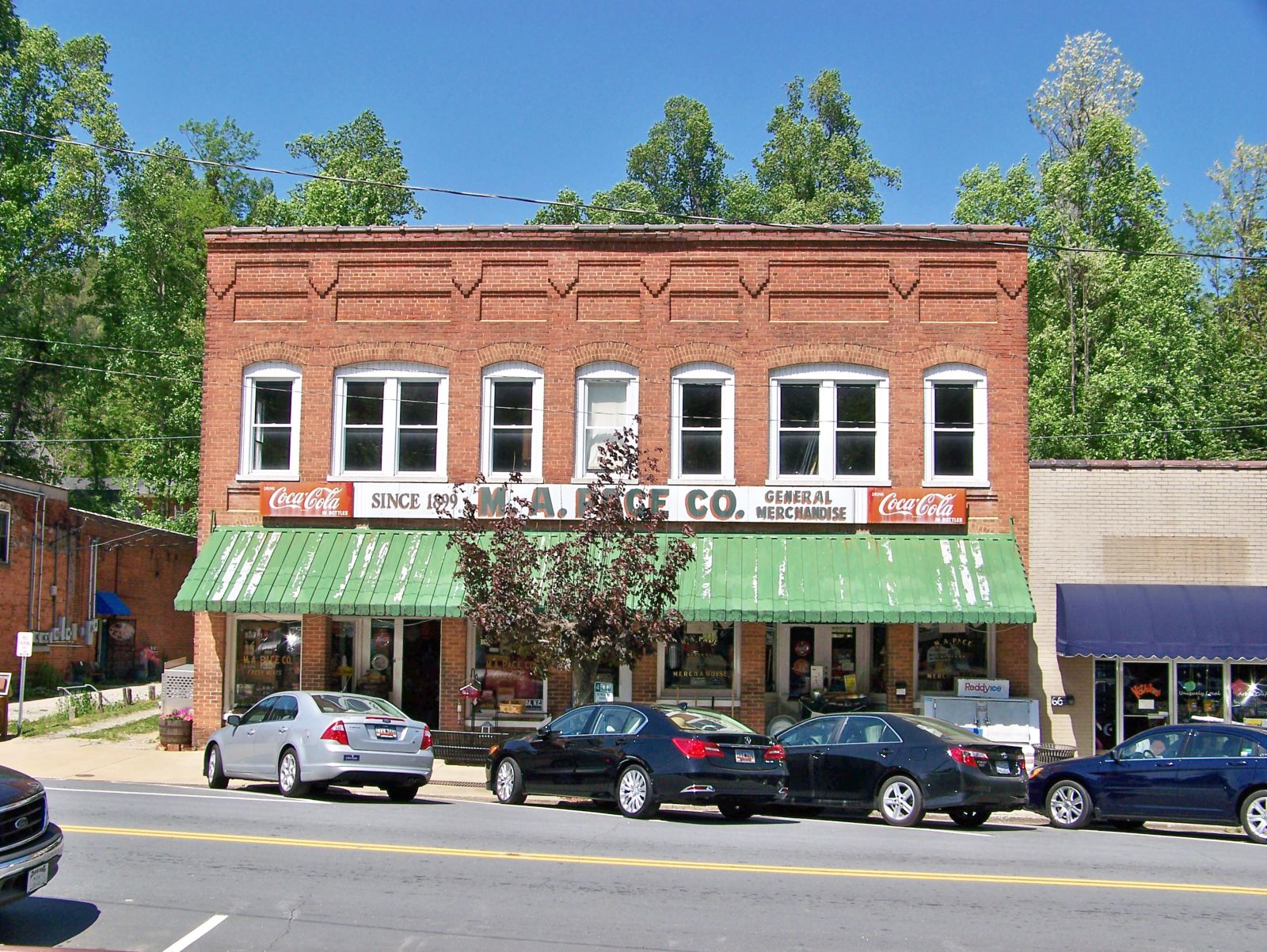
M.A. Pace Company
