= Blackberry Hill (Tryon, North Carolina) =

Historic house in North Carolina, United States

- U.S. National Register of Historic Places
- Location within North Carolina Location within the United States
- Location: East of Tryon on SR 1516, near Tryon, North Carolina
- Coordinates: 35°12′20″N 82°12′34″W
- Area: 9 acres (3.6 ha)
- Built: 1847
- Architectural style: Federal
- NRHP reference No.: 74001372
- Added to NRHP: November 21, 1974

Blackberry Hill, also known as Mills House, is a historic plantation house located near Tryon, Polk County, North Carolina. It was built about 1847, and is a two-story, five-bay, Federal style frame dwelling. It has exterior gable end chimneys and flanking one-story wing additions. The front facade features a two-tier colonnaded porch.

It was added to the National Register of Historic Places in 1974.
