= Seven Hearths =

Historic house in North Carolina, US

- U.S. National Register of Historic Places
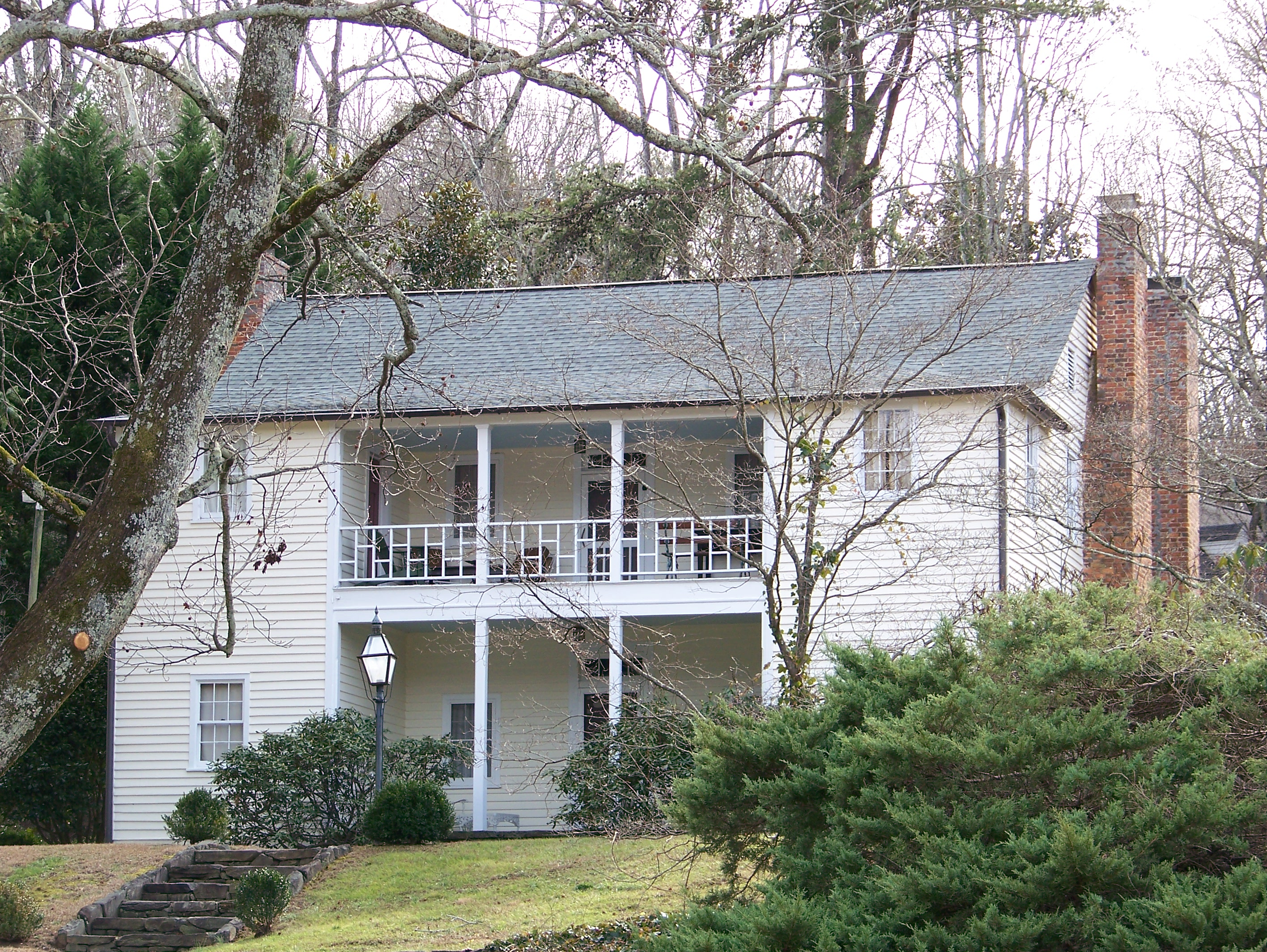

- Location within North Carolina Location within the United States
- Location: North of Tryon at junction of U.S. Route 176 and Harmon Field Rd., near Tryon, North Carolina
- Coordinates: 35°13′20″N 82°15′4″W
- Area: 2 acres (0.81 ha)
- Built: c. 1800
- Architectural style: Federal
- NRHP reference No.: 76001333
- Added to NRHP: March 26, 1976

Seven Hearths is a historic plantation house located near Tryon, Polk County, North Carolina. It was built about 1800 for Marvel (Marville) Mills - assumed built by his father Major William Mills, and is a two-story, five-bay, Federal style frame dwelling. It has exterior gable end double shouldered chimneys and flanking one bay wide, one bay deep projections.

It was added to the National Register of Historic Places in 1976.
