= House Mountain =

House Mountain may refer to:

- House Mountain (Arizona)
- House Mountain (Knox County, Tennessee)
- House Mountain (Rockbridge County, Virginia)

== See also ==
- Mountain House (disambiguation)
