= Railway Clerks' Mountain House =

- U.S. National Register of Historic Places
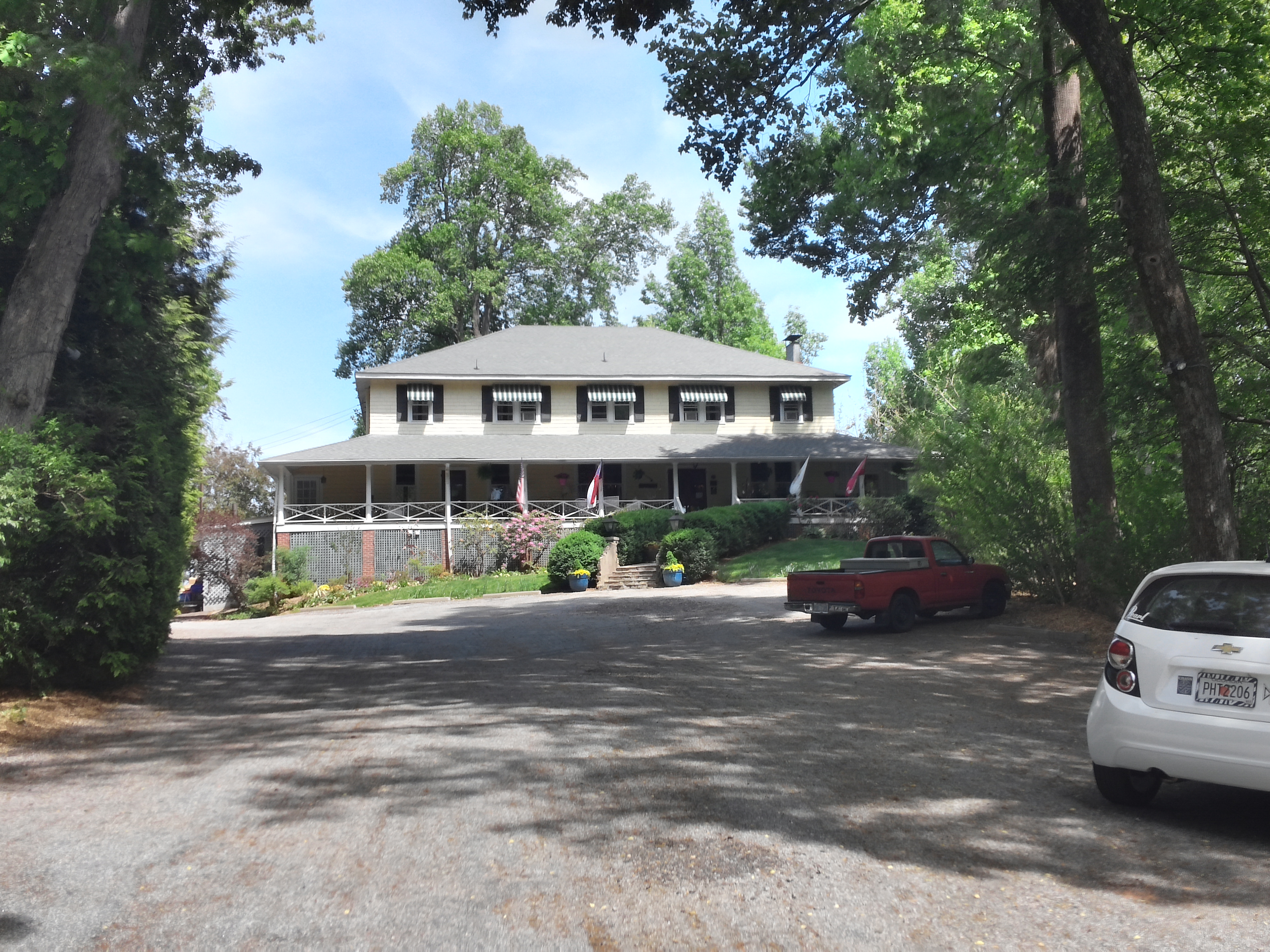

- Location within North Carolina Location within the United States
- Location: 100 Orchard Inn Lane (U.S. Route 176, 0.6 miles (0.97 km) southeast of the junction with Ozone Rd.), near Saluda, North Carolina
- Coordinates: 35°13′50″N 82°20′10″W
- Area: 12.2 acres (4.9 ha)
- Built: 1926
- Architectural style: craftsman-influenced
- NRHP reference No.: 00000842
- Added to NRHP: July 28, 2000

Railway Clerks' Mountain House, also known as the Mountain Home, Clerks' Mountain Home, and Orchard Inn, is a historic country inn located near Saluda, Polk County, North Carolina. The inn ("home") was built in 1926, and is a two-story, six-bay, frame building with Colonial Revival and American Craftsman style design influences. It has a hipped roof and features a full-width hip-roofed one-story porch supported by slender Tuscan order columns. Also on the property are three contributing guest cottages built about 1926: the "Paulownia" Cottage, "Boxwood" Cottage, and "Twin Poplar" Cottage. The property was originally developed by the Brotherhood of Railway Clerks of the Southern Railway System as a summer retreat. The union retained the property until 1962.

It was added to the National Register of Historic Places in 2000.
