= Sunnyvale (disambiguation) =

Sunnyvale, California is a city in Santa Clara County in Silicon Valley.

Sunnyvale may also refer to:

== Places ==
=== America ===
- Sunnyvale, Missouri, a former village in northern Newton County, Missouri, United States
- Sunnyvale, Texas, a suburb of Dallas, Texas, United States

=== Australia ===
- Sunnyvale, South Australia a locality on Yorke Peninsula

=== New Zealand ===
- Sunnyvale, Auckland, a suburb of Auckland, New Zealand
- Sunnyvale, Otago, a suburb of Dunedin, New Zealand
  - Sunnyvale Park, a sports venue in Sunnyvale, Dunedin

== Arts, entertainment, and media ==
- Sunnyvale, the original title of the romantic comedy film Opie Gets Laid
- Sunnyvale, the fictional suburb from the Australian comedy TV series, Housos
- Sunnyvale Trailer Park, the fictional home of the characters of Trailer Park Boys
- Sunnyvale, a fictional town in the Fear Street books by R. L. Stine
- Sunnyvale, a fictional town for the dolls in the movie Life-Size

== See also ==
- Sunnydale (disambiguation)
