= 1920 United States presidential election in North Carolina =

- November 2, 1920

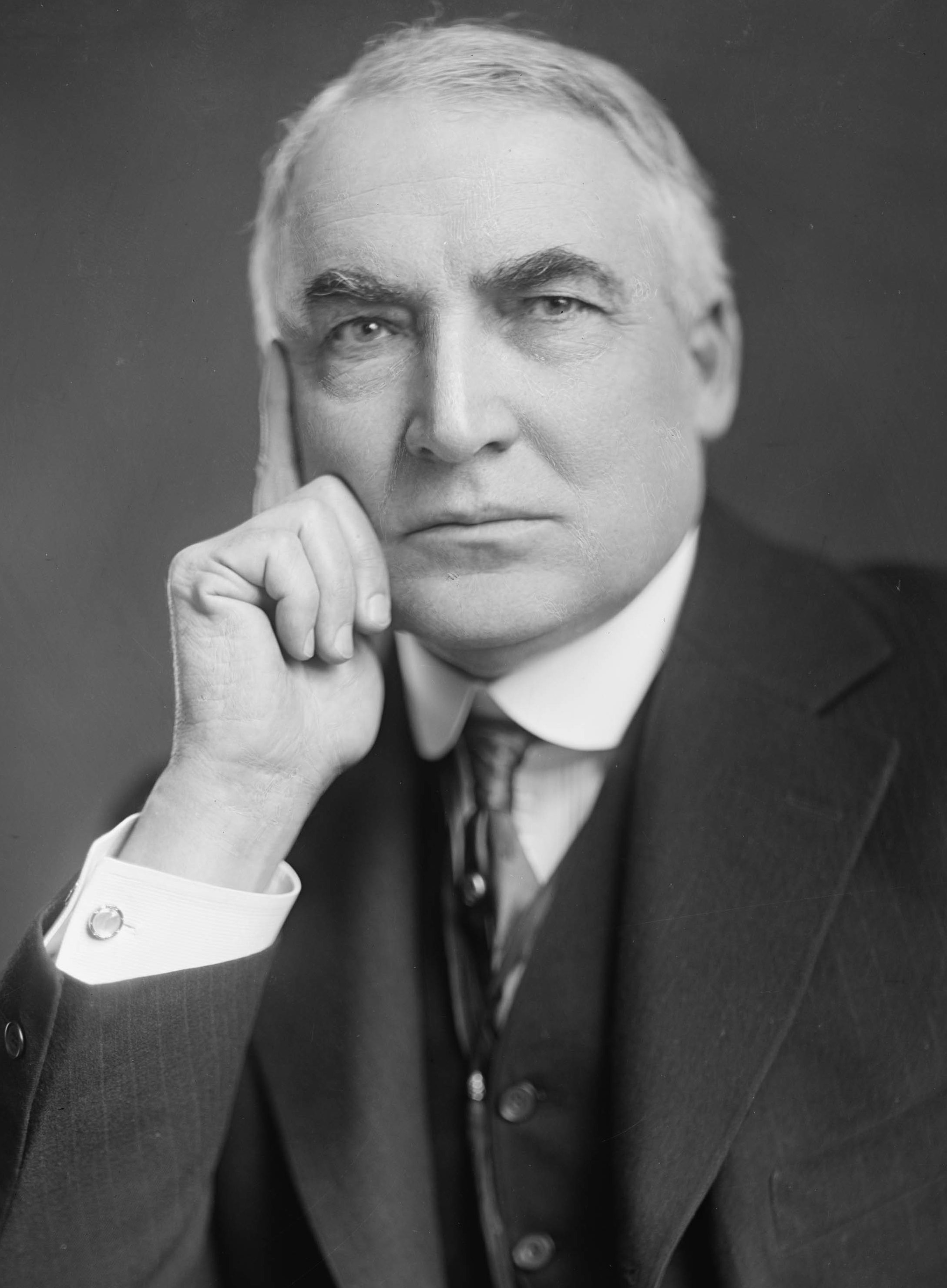
Nominee	James M. Cox	Warren G. Harding
Party	Democratic	Republican
Home state	Ohio	Ohio
Running mate	Franklin D. Roosevelt	Calvin Coolidge
Electoral vote	12	0
Popular vote	305,447	232,848
Percentage	56.69%	43.22%
County results
Cox
50–60%
60–70%
70–80%
80–90%
90–100%
Harding
50–60%
60–70%
70–80%
80–90%
President before election
Woodrow Wilson
Democratic
Elected President
Warren G. Harding
Republican

The 1920 United States presidential election in North Carolina took place on November 2, 1920, as part of the 1920 United States presidential election, which was held throughout all contemporary forty-eight states. Voters chose twelve representatives, or electors to the Electoral College, who voted for president and vice president.

Like all former Confederate states, North Carolina would during its "Redemption" develop a politics based upon Jim Crow laws, disfranchisement of its African-American population and dominance of the Democratic Party. Unlike the Deep South, the Republican Party possessed sufficient historic Unionist white support from the mountains and northwestern Piedmont to gain a stable one-third of the statewide vote total in general elections even after blacks lost the right to vote. Although with disfranchisement of blacks the state introduced a poll tax, it was less severe than other former Confederate states with the result that a greater proportion of whites participated than anywhere else in the South. A rapid move following disenfranchisement to a completely "lily-white" state GOP also helped maintain Republican support amongst the state's voters. Like Virginia, Tennessee and Oklahoma, the relative strength of Republican opposition meant that North Carolina did not have statewide White primaries, although certain counties did use the White primary.

Although North Carolina had never given women suffrage rights at any level of government before 1919, nor did its legislature consider the Nineteenth Amendment when it passed the Federal House and Senate, during 1920 the state passed by more a more than three-to-one margin a constitutional amendment that made it the first former Confederate state to abolish its poll tax. This amendment was first proposed as early as 1908, but was only given serious thought by the state legislature after the Sixteenth Amendment took effect in 1913 and it was recognized that North Carolina was burdened with an inefficient and regressive tax system. The abolition of the poll tax and women's suffrage, as it turned out, would cause in North Carolina amongst the largest mobilizations of new voters in the Union.

Although Republican nominee Warren G. Harding had urged the state's mountain Republican legislators to ratify the Nineteenth Amendment, neither Harding nor Democratic nominee and Ohio Governor James M. Cox did any campaigning in a state which had voted Democratic at every election since 1876. However, at the end of October the GOP, sensing a landslide, believed based on an early Rexall straw poll that it had a chance of carrying North Carolina as well as Tennessee (Note: Harding would actually carry Tennessee by 13,271 votes and thus achieve the first GOP victory in the former Confederacy since 1876 and in Tennessee since 1868.) for its first victory in a former Confederate state since 1876. Later returns, however, gave Cox a larger win than Woodrow Wilson had gained in 1916. As it turned out, Cox would carry the state comfortably, and North Carolina would prove the state that most resisted the anti-Wilson trend, with Cox losing fewer than 3 percentage points on Wilson and Polk County even switching from voting for Republican Charles Evans Hughes in 1916 to voting for Cox.

== Results ==
Presidential Candidate	Running Mate	Party	Electoral Vote (EV)	Popular Vote (PV)	
James M. Cox of Ohio	Franklin D. Roosevelt	Democratic	12	305,447	56.69%
Warren G. Harding	Calvin Coolidge	Republican	0	232,848	43.22%
Eugene V. Debs	Seymour Stedman	Socialist	0	446 (Note: These third-party votes were not separated by county but listed only as a statewide total.)	0.08%
Aaron S. Watkins	D. Leigh Colvin	Prohibition	0	17	0.00%

=== Results by county ===
1920 United States presidential election in North Carolina by county
County	James Middleton Cox Democratic		Warren Gamaliel Harding Republican		Margin	
County	%	#	%	#	%	#
Edgecombe	99.29%	3,343	0.71%	24	98.57%	3,319
Northampton	93.32%	2,305	6.68%	165	86.64%	2,140
Currituck	92.08%	1,000	7.92%	86	84.16%	914
Bertie	89.67%	1,840	10.33%	212	79.34%	1,628
Hoke	88.41%	1,266	11.59%	166	76.82%	1,100
Anson	88.00%	3,175	12.00%	433	76.00%	2,742
Halifax	86.74%	3,429	13.26%	524	73.49%	2,905
Warren	86.34%	1,865	13.66%	295	72.69%	1,570
New Hanover	85.21%	4,102	14.79%	712	70.42%	3,390
Scotland	84.78%	1,705	15.22%	306	69.57%	1,399
Chowan	83.92%	1,091	16.08%	209	67.85%	882
Hertford	83.32%	1,104	16.68%	221	66.64%	883
Pitt	82.92%	4,196	17.08%	864	65.85%	3,332
Martin	82.85%	2,561	17.15%	530	65.71%	2,031
Craven	82.36%	3,413	17.64%	731	64.72%	2,682
Franklin	82.32%	2,742	17.68%	589	64.64%	2,153
Camden	79.18%	540	20.82%	142	58.36%	398
Greene	78.98%	1,649	21.02%	439	57.95%	1,210
Pasquotank	77.40%	1,736	22.60%	507	54.79%	1,229
Mecklenburg	76.78%	11,313	23.22%	3,421	53.56%	7,892
Granville	75.89%	2,622	24.11%	833	51.78%	1,789
Vance	75.10%	2,461	24.90%	816	50.20%	1,645
Richmond	74.83%	3,341	25.17%	1,124	49.65%	2,217
Union	74.80%	4,168	25.20%	1,404	49.61%	2,764
Robeson	73.58%	6,183	26.42%	2,220	47.16%	3,963
Nash	72.15%	4,031	27.85%	1,556	44.30%	2,475
Wilson	71.79%	3,496	28.21%	1,374	43.57%	2,122
Jones	71.46%	964	28.54%	385	42.92%	579
Caswell	71.04%	1,239	28.96%	505	42.09%	734
Gates	70.88%	796	29.12%	327	41.76%	469
Pender	69.33%	1,580	30.67%	699	38.66%	881
Lenoir	68.95%	2,560	31.05%	1,153	37.89%	1,407
Wake	68.71%	8,020	31.29%	3,653	37.41%	4,367
Perquimans	68.15%	1,042	31.85%	487	36.30%	555
Hyde	68.15%	1,134	31.85%	530	36.30%	604
Lee	67.06%	2,327	32.94%	1,143	34.12%	1,184
Onslow	64.61%	1,557	35.39%	853	29.21%	704
Bladen	64.57%	1,939	35.43%	1,064	29.14%	875
Cleveland	63.70%	5,181	36.30%	2,953	27.39%	2,228
Columbus	63.57%	3,111	36.43%	1,783	27.14%	1,328
Wayne	62.95%	4,794	37.05%	2,822	25.89%	1,972
Cumberland	62.11%	3,233	37.89%	1,972	24.23%	1,261
Beaufort	60.85%	3,522	39.15%	2,266	21.70%	1,256
Iredell	59.51%	6,470	40.49%	4,402	19.02%	2,068
Haywood	58.50%	4,229	41.50%	3,000	17.00%	1,229
Tyrrell	57.44%	718	42.56%	532	14.88%	186
Rowan	56.78%	6,421	43.22%	4,888	13.56%	1,533
Durham	56.69%	4,646	43.31%	3,550	13.37%	1,096
Dare	56.62%	825	43.38%	632	13.25%	193
Pamlico	56.06%	1,286	43.94%	1,008	12.12%	278
Rutherford	55.96%	5,101	44.04%	4,015	11.91%	1,086
Buncombe	55.91%	10,167	44.09%	8,017	11.82%	2,150
Duplin	55.75%	3,398	44.25%	2,697	11.50%	701
Rockingham	55.56%	4,507	44.44%	3,605	11.12%	902
Gaston	55.19%	7,148	44.81%	5,803	10.39%	1,345
Guilford	54.83%	9,615	45.17%	7,920	9.67%	1,695
Forsyth	54.46%	8,123	45.54%	6,792	8.92%	1,331
Harnett	54.20%	3,919	45.80%	3,311	8.41%	608
Moore	54.03%	2,679	45.97%	2,279	8.07%	400
Alleghany	53.98%	1,409	46.02%	1,201	7.97%	208
Washington	53.47%	1,116	46.53%	971	6.95%	145
Orange	53.43%	1,993	46.57%	1,737	6.86%	256
Alamance	53.22%	5,255	46.78%	4,619	6.44%	636
McDowell	52.31%	2,809	47.69%	2,561	4.62%	248
Chatham	52.30%	3,186	47.70%	2,906	4.60%	280
Johnston	51.90%	6,030	48.10%	5,588	3.80%	442
Macon	51.50%	2,177	48.50%	2,050	3.00%	127
Lincoln	51.50%	3,331	48.50%	3,137	3.00%	194
Person	51.25%	1,646	48.75%	1,566	2.49%	80
Polk	50.65%	1,361	49.35%	1,326	1.30%	35
Jackson	50.32%	2,385	49.68%	2,355	0.63%	30
Montgomery	50.18%	2,321	49.82%	2,304	0.37%	17
Brunswick	47.92%	1,253	52.08%	1,362	-4.17%	-109
Transylvania	47.86%	1,542	52.14%	1,680	-4.28%	-138
Catawba	47.66%	5,404	52.34%	5,935	-4.68%	-531
Burke	47.59%	3,262	52.41%	3,592	-4.81%	-330
Ashe	47.40%	3,431	52.60%	3,808	-5.21%	-377
Carteret	47.21%	2,070	52.79%	2,315	-5.59%	-245
Stanly	47.12%	3,843	52.88%	4,312	-5.75%	-469
Caldwell	47.05%	2,931	52.95%	3,298	-5.89%	-367
Yancey	46.76%	2,280	53.24%	2,596	-6.48%	-316
Cabarrus	46.18%	4,418	53.82%	5,148	-7.63%	-730
Clay	45.32%	755	54.68%	911	-9.36%	-156
Randolph	44.80%	5,110	55.20%	6,297	-10.41%	-1,187
Davidson	44.59%	4,797	55.41%	5,960	-10.81%	-1,163
Alexander	43.62%	2,045	56.38%	2,643	-12.76%	-598
Henderson	42.79%	2,496	57.21%	3,337	-14.42%	-841
Graham	41.31%	644	58.69%	915	-17.38%	-271
Cherokee	41.27%	1,761	58.73%	2,506	-17.46%	-745
Surry	40.69%	3,547	59.31%	5,170	-18.62%	-1,623
Stokes	40.59%	1,999	59.41%	2,926	-18.82%	-927
Watauga	39.55%	1,721	60.45%	2,631	-20.91%	-910
Swain	39.04%	1,434	60.96%	2,239	-21.92%	-805
Davie	38.53%	1,624	61.47%	2,591	-22.94%	-967
Sampson	31.19%	2,426	68.81%	5,353	-37.63%	-2,927
Wilkes	30.59%	2,843	69.41%	6,451	-38.82%	-3,608
Yadkin	29.03%	1,350	70.97%	3,301	-41.95%	-1,951
Madison	27.04%	1,340	72.96%	3,616	-45.92%	-2,276
Mitchell	24.46%	697	75.54%	2,153	-51.09%	-1,456
Avery	13.69%	397	86.31%	2,503	-72.62%	-2,106
