= Mill Farm Inn =

- U.S. National Register of Historic Places
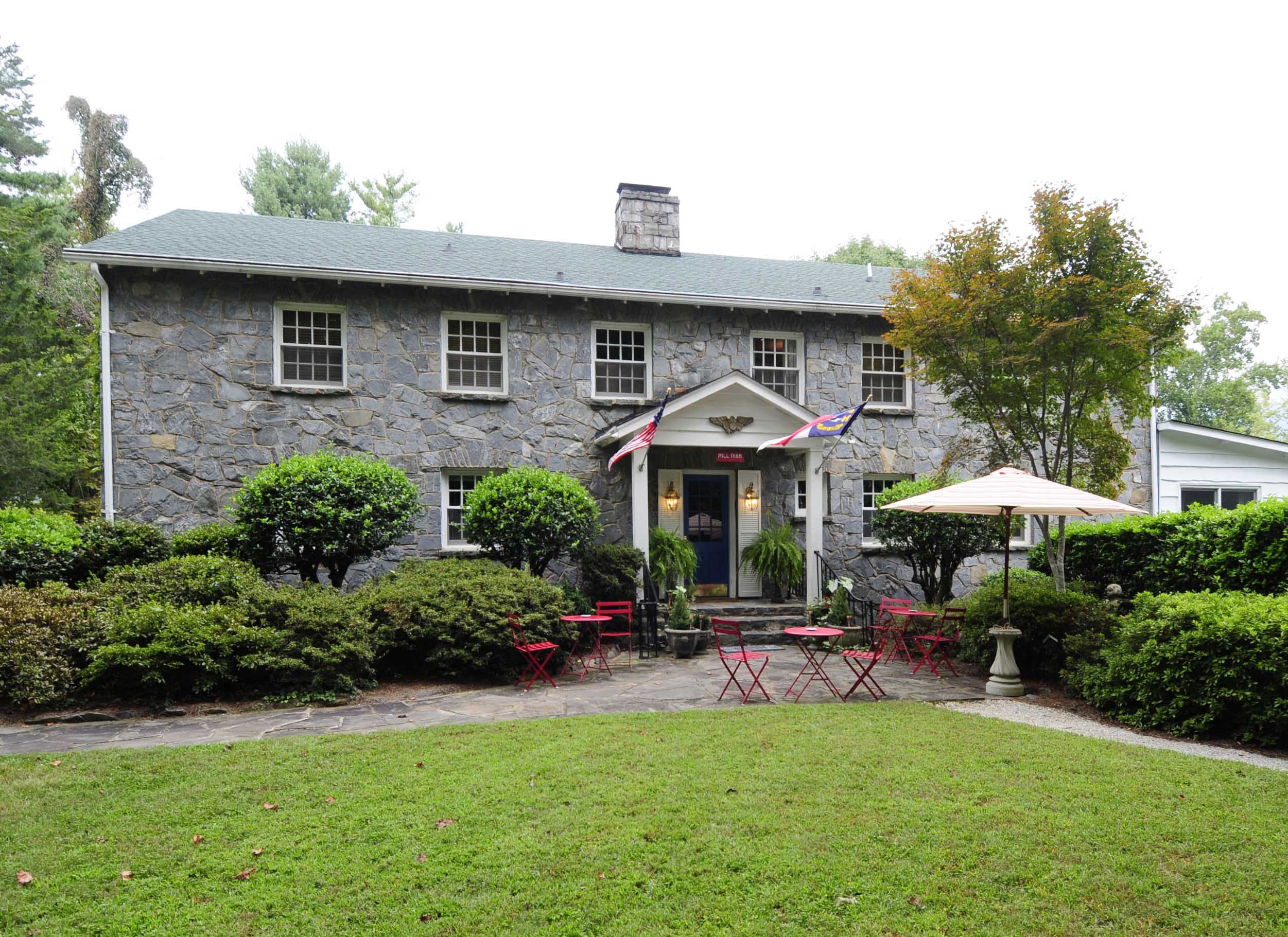
- Mill Farm Inn, September 2012

- Location within North Carolina Location within the United States
- Location: 701 Harmon Field Rd., near Tryon, North Carolina
- Coordinates: 35°13′24″N 82°14′52″W
- Area: 3.8 acres (1.5 ha)
- Built: 1939
- Architect: Walcott, Russell S.
- Architectural style: Colonial Revival
- NRHP reference No.: 08001366
- Added to NRHP: January 22, 2009

Mill Farm Inn is a historic country inn located near Tryon, Polk County, North Carolina. The inn was built between 1937 and 1939, and is a two-story, six bay by four bay, Colonial Revival style stone building. It is constructed of local blue granite.

It was added to the National Register of Historic Places in 2009.
