= Tryon Country Club =

- U.S. National Register of Historic Places
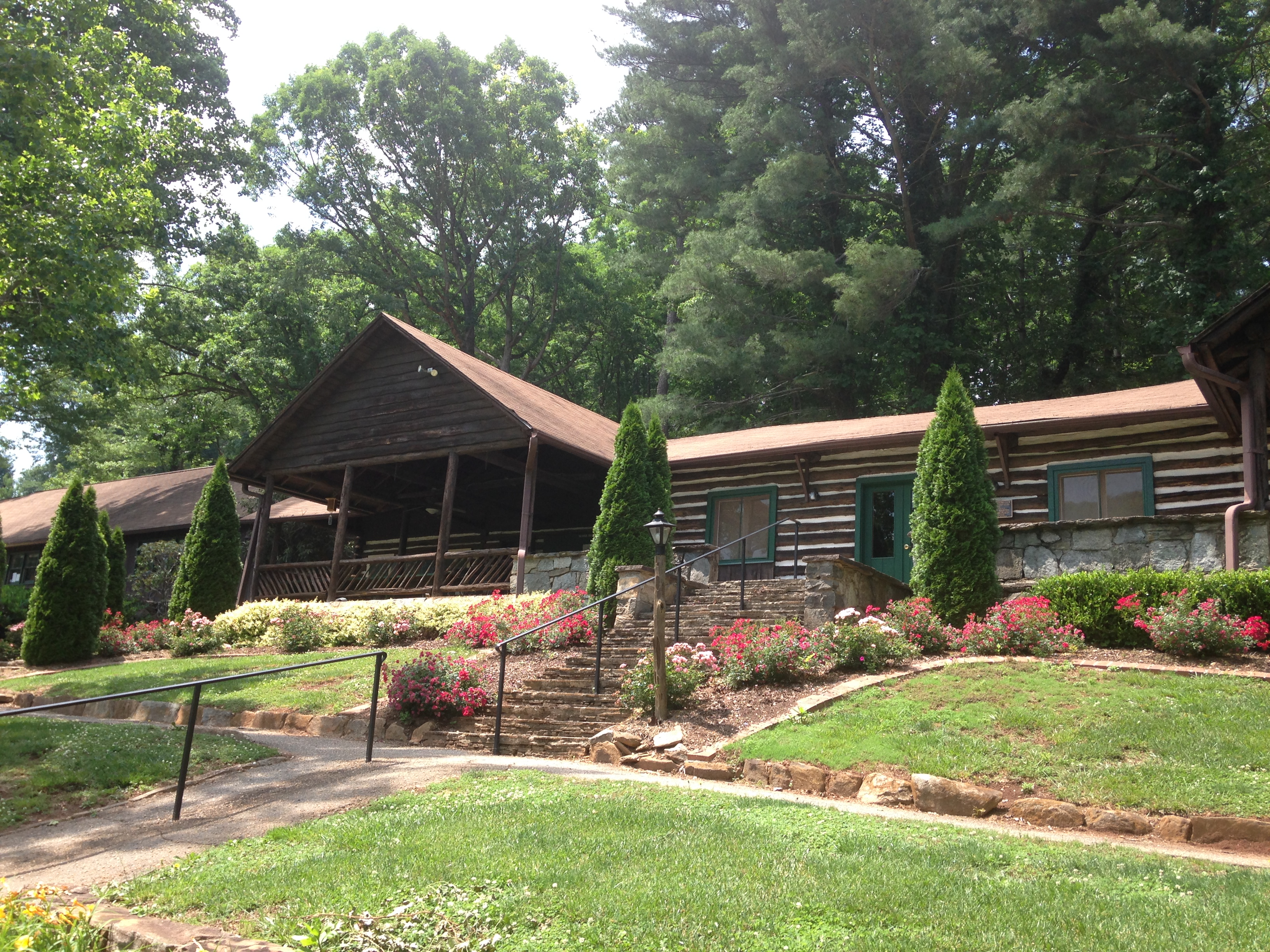

- Location within North Carolina Location within the United States
- Location: 393 Country Club Rd., near Tryon, North Carolina
- Coordinates: 35°13′07″N 82°15′16″W
- Area: 90 acres (36 ha)
- Built: 1917, 1922, 1943
- Built by: Leonard, Robert A.
- Architectural style: Rustic Revival
- NRHP reference No.: 12001262
- Added to NRHP: February 5, 2013

Tryon Country Club is a historic country club located near Tryon, Polk County, North Carolina. The nine-hole golf course was originally laid out in 1914; the course opened in 1917. The donor family attests that the layout was designed by noted golfer Donald Ross. The clubhouse was built in 1922, and is a one-story, five-bay, Rustic Revival style log building with two projecting front-gable porches. The pro shop and storage building was built about 1935, and is a one-story side-gable frame structure, with additions made about 1940, 1958, and 1972. Also on the golf course is a contributing one-story frame building known as the Summer House and added in 1958.

It was added to the National Register of Historic Places in 2013.
