= Sunnidale =

Sunnidale may refer to the following places in Canada:

- Sunnidale, Lambton County, Ontario
- Sunnidale, Simcoe County, Ontario
- Sunnidale Corners, Ontario

== See also ==
- Sunnydale (disambiguation)
- Sunningdale, a village in Berkshire, England
