= Pine Crest Inn =

- U.S. National Register of Historic Places
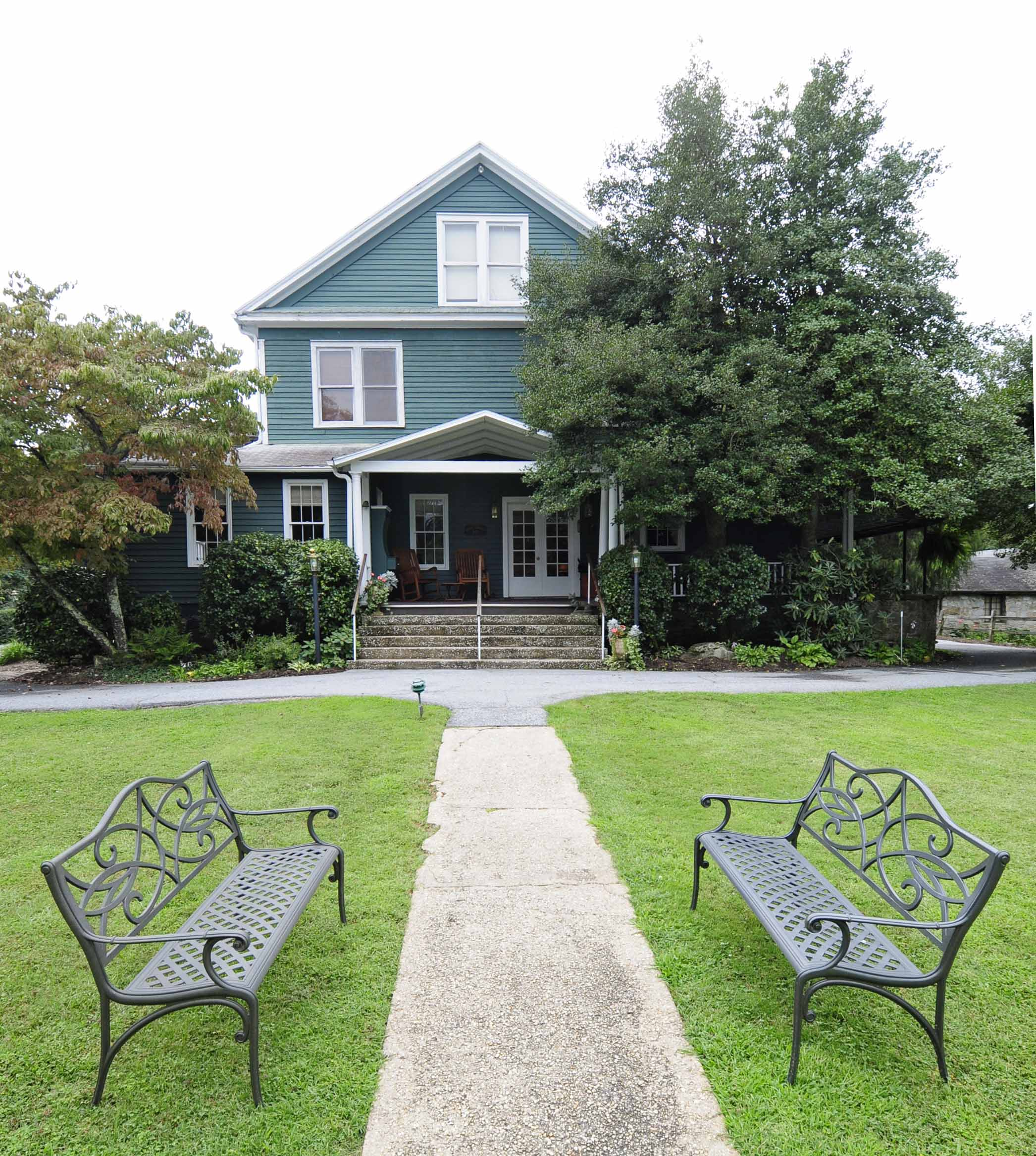
- Pine Crest Inn, September 2012

- Location within North Carolina Location within the United States
- Location: Pine Crest Lane, Tryon, North Carolina
- Coordinates: 35°12′31″N 82°14′2″W
- Area: 8.6 acres (3.5 ha)
- Built: 1906
- Architectural style: Classical Revival, Neo-Classical Revival
- NRHP reference No.: 82003500
- Added to NRHP: April 15, 1982

Pine Crest Inn is a historic resort inn complex located in Tryon, Polk County, North Carolina. The inn and three of the ten cottages were built in 1906 as the Thermal Belt Sanatorium for tuberculosis care. The 2 1/2-story inn and 1 1/2-story cottages are Classical Revival style frame buildings that feature pedimented gables and attached one-story shed porches supported by Tuscan order columns. The remaining cottages were built after the conversion of the property to an inn in 1917. Four of the cottages were built by Pine Crest Inn developer Carter Brown, and two are historic log cabins moved to the property from the eastern Tennessee mountains.

The property was added to the National Register of Historic Places in 1982.

In 1997, the inn added a 2-story conference center with three conference rooms, and now attracts numerous corporate, governmental, and private meetings, retreats, and events.
