= Blockhouse Site =

- U.S. National Register of Historic Places
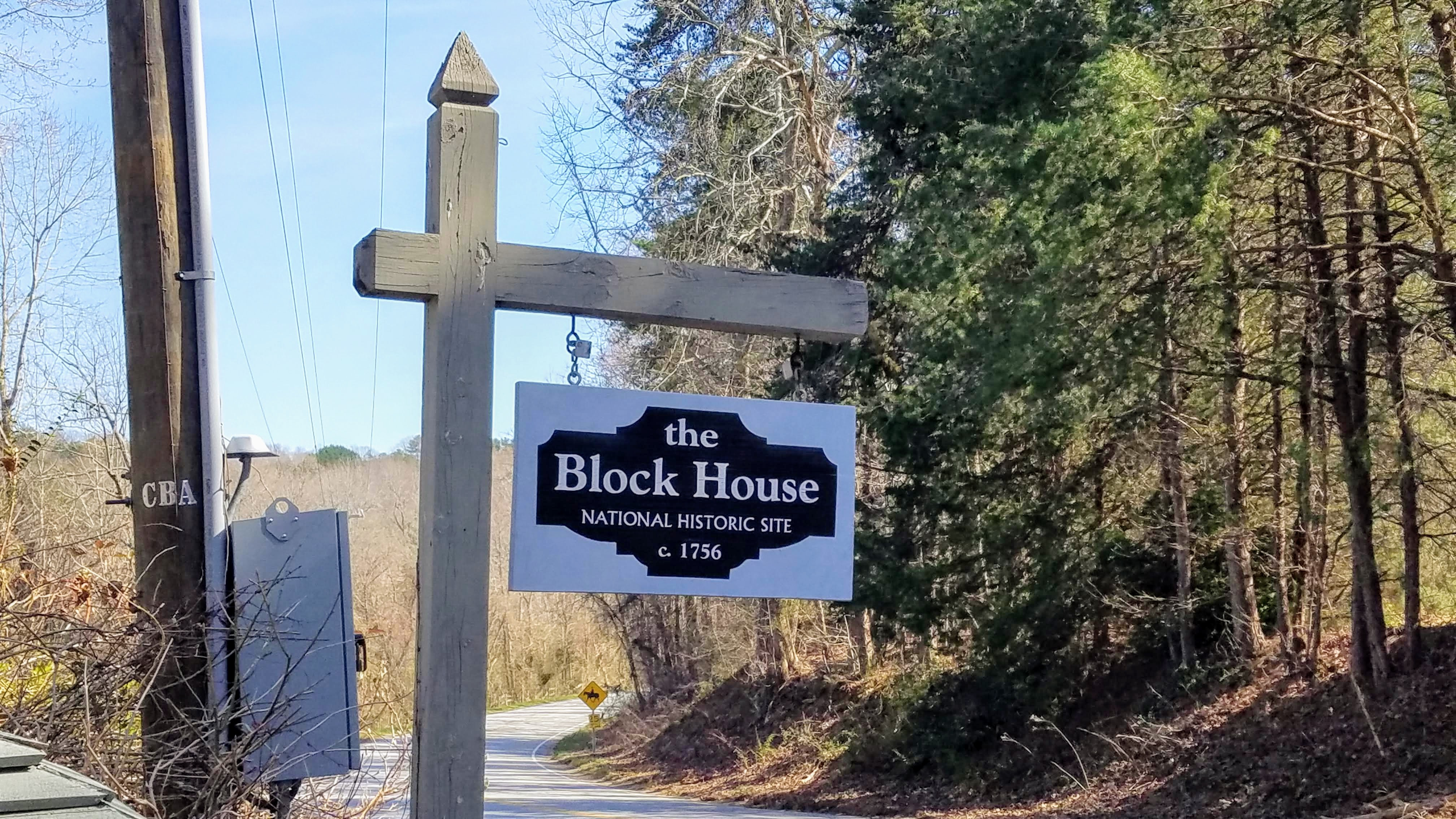

- Location within North Carolina Location within the United States
- Location: East of U.S. Route 176, near Tryon, North Carolina
- Coordinates: 35°11′47″N 82°13′4″W
- Area: 8 acres (3.2 ha)
- Built: c. 1756
- Architectural style: Dogtrot house
- NRHP reference No.: 70000466
- Added to NRHP: October 15, 1970

Blockhouse Site is a historic blockhouse located near Tryon, Polk County, North Carolina. It was built about 1756, as a dogtrot log cabin, with two rooms separated by an open passage. In 1942, the blockhouse was moved from South Carolina into North Carolina to its present site, about 300 yards from its original location. Following its move, the building was remodeled, enlarged, and embellished. The blockhouse marked the western end of the original boundary line between North and South Carolina established in 1772. The boundary line was remeasured in 1813, and a marker placed at the site in 1815.

It was added to the National Register of Historic Places in 1970.
