= Stone Hedge (Polk County, North Carolina) =

Historic house in North Carolina, United States

- U.S. National Register of Historic Places
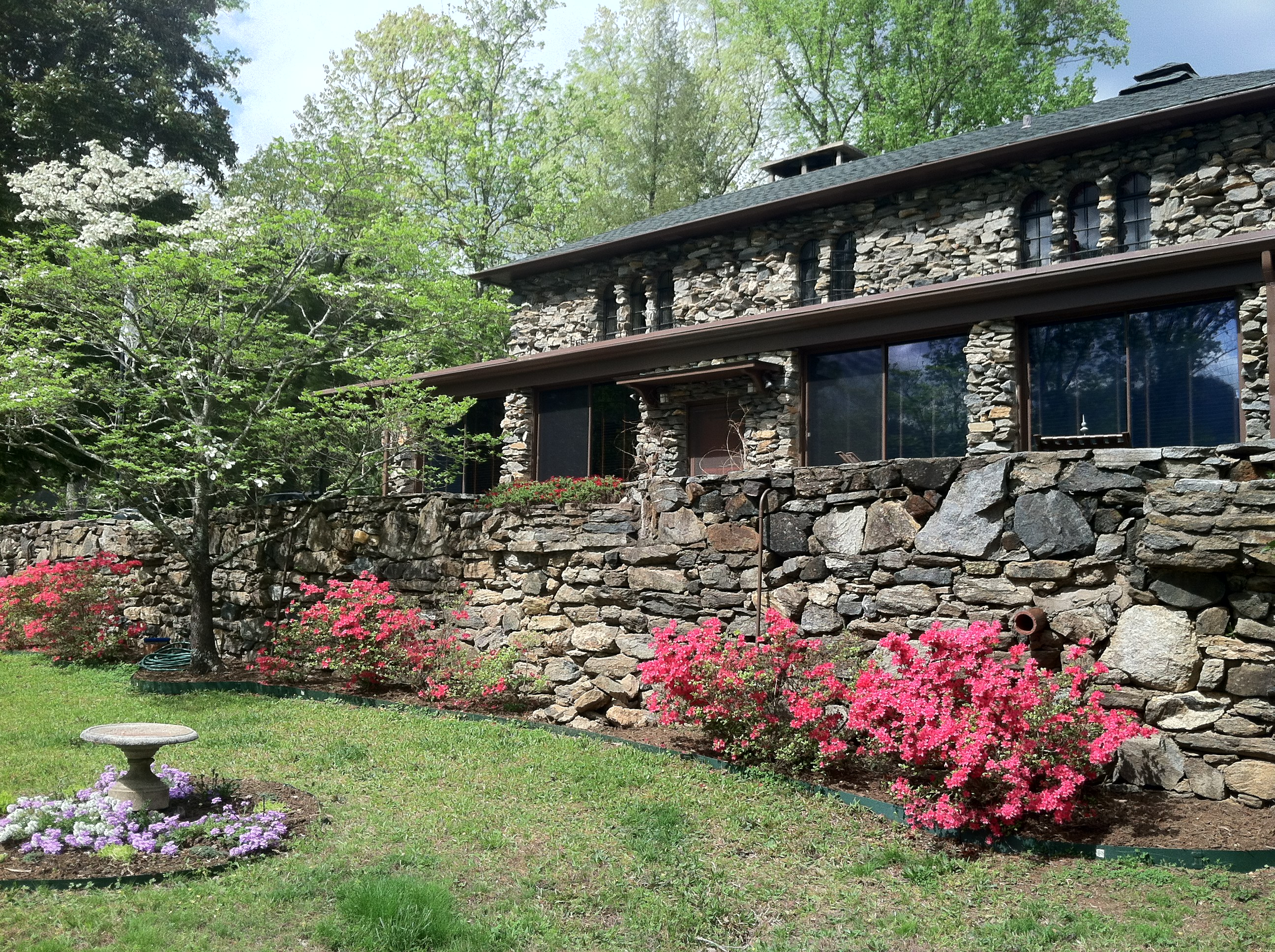

- Location within North Carolina Location within the United States
- Location: 222 Stone Hedge Ln., near Tryon, North Carolina
- Coordinates: 35°14′41″N 82°14′52″W
- Area: 25 acres (10 ha)
- Built: 1953
- NRHP reference No.: 15000166
- Added to NRHP: April 21, 2015

Stone Hedge is a historic estate at 222 Stone Hedge Lane in Polk County, North Carolina, north of Tryon. The main house is a two-story structure, built primarily out of uncoursed rusticated stone. The property, originally 250 acres (100 ha) includes a single-story guesthouse with similar construction. The estate was built in 1935 by Thomas and Lillian Costa, and represents a distinctive architectural interpretation of North Carolina's mountain summer estates.

The house was added to the National Register of Historic Places in 2015.

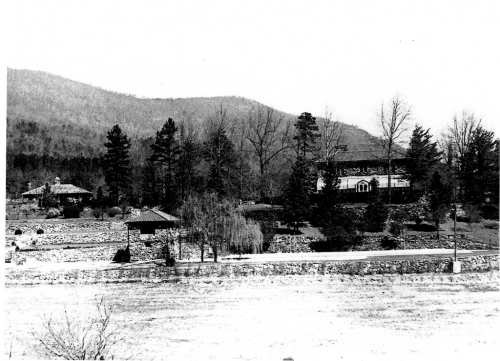
Early photo of Stone Hedge, Polk County, Tryon NC USA

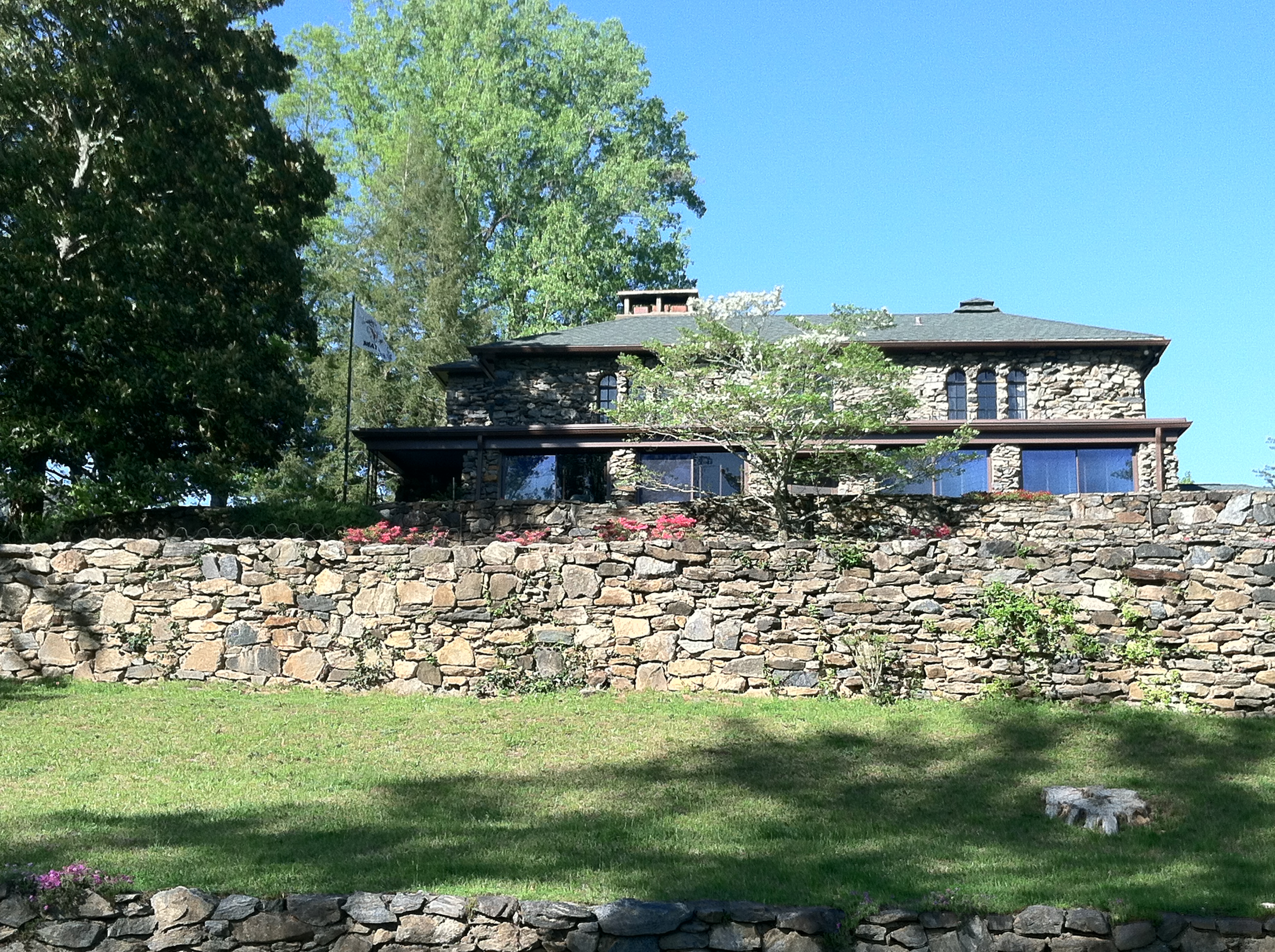
View looking up the hill at Stone Hedge.

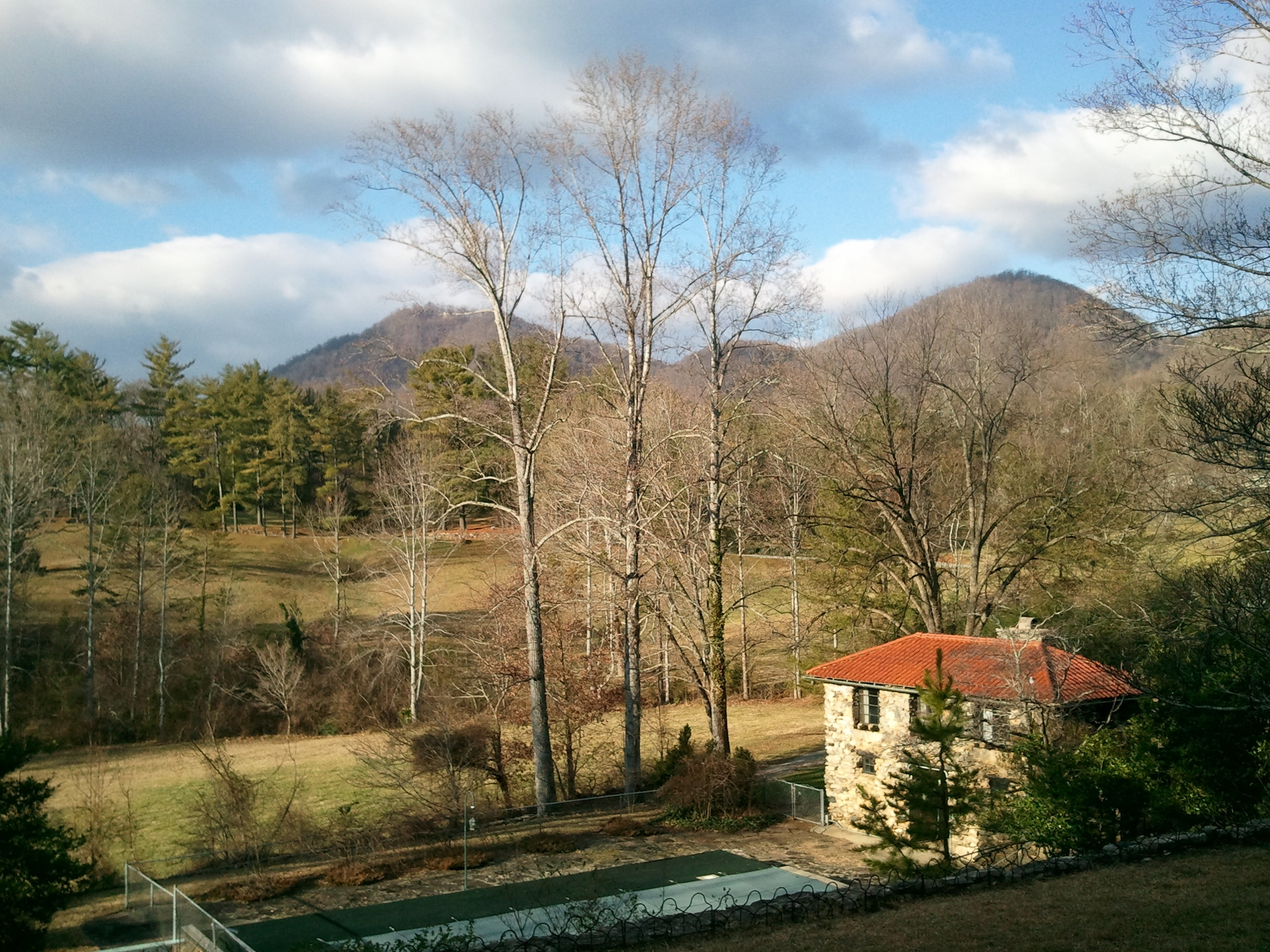
View of the pool house and Warrior Mountain from the terraces of Stone Hedge
