= Lake Adger =

- Location within North Carolina
- Location: Polk County, North Carolina
- Coordinates: 35°20′05″N 82°13′24″W
- Type: lake
- Basin countries: United States
- Surface area: 438 acres (177 ha)
- Shore length^{1}: 14 miles (23 km)
- Surface elevation: 906 ft (276 m)
- ^{1} Shore length is not a well-defined measure.

Lake Adger is a mountain lake in Polk County, North Carolina, north of Tryon and south of Lake Lure, North Carolina.

== Overview ==
The lake was formed in 1925 when Blue Ridge Power built a dam on the Green River at Turner Shoals. Lake Adger is approximately 438 acres (177 ha) and has over 14 miles (23 km) of shoreline. The property around Lake Adger is private with the exception of a public boat landing that is leased from Lake Adger Homeowners Association by the North Carolina Wildlife Resources Commission for $15,000 a year for public boating and fishing. In 2009 the lake was purchased by Polk County for $1.6 million.

Polk County now owns the Lake Adger Dam, all land under the water and all land to the high water line around Lake Adger. Lake Adger was named after Blue Ridge Power Company's founder, John Adger Law. John Adger Law's mother's maiden name was Adger and he chose to name the lake after her family' surname. The lake was originally named Turner Shoals Lake but John decided to change the name after the Dam was completed. The Dam is still known as Turner Shoals Dam. As at 2014, the Dam was still operated by Northbrook Hydroelectric, who leases it from Polk County, for water release and electricity. The Duke Power Steam station at Cliffside, NC, downstream of Lake Adger, uses the water released by Turner Shoals to cool the plant's turbines.
