= Mills-Screven Plantation =

Historic house in North Carolina, United States

- U.S. National Register of Historic Places
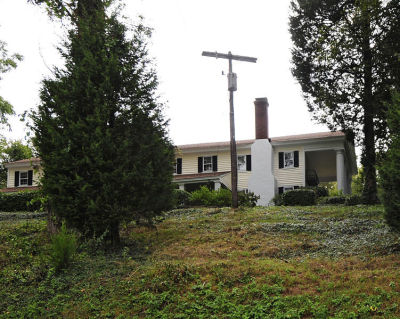

- Location within North Carolina Location within the United States
- Location: NE of Tryon on SR 1509, Tryon, North Carolina
- Coordinates: 35°13′20″N 82°15′4″W
- Area: 11.1 acres (4.5 ha)
- Built: c. 1820-1840
- Architectural style: Greek Revival, Federal
- NRHP reference No.: 83001904
- Added to NRHP: February 17, 1983

Mills-Screven Plantation, also known as Hilltop, is a historic plantation house located near Tryon, Polk County, North Carolina. The main house was built about 1820 and later expanded into the 1840s, and is a long two-story, seven-bay, Federal / Greek Revival style frame dwelling. It features a two-tier, three-bay, pedimented Ionic order portico. Also on the property are the contributing stone springhouse, guesthouse part of which is said to have been a slave cabin, double pen log crib, and a larger 20th century frame barn.

It was added to the National Register of Historic Places in 1983.

The original owners were slaveholders ohn McIntire and Govan Mills (1805–1862).
