= Sunnydale (Tryon, North Carolina) =

Historic building in Tryon, Polk County, North Carolina

- U.S. National Register of Historic Places
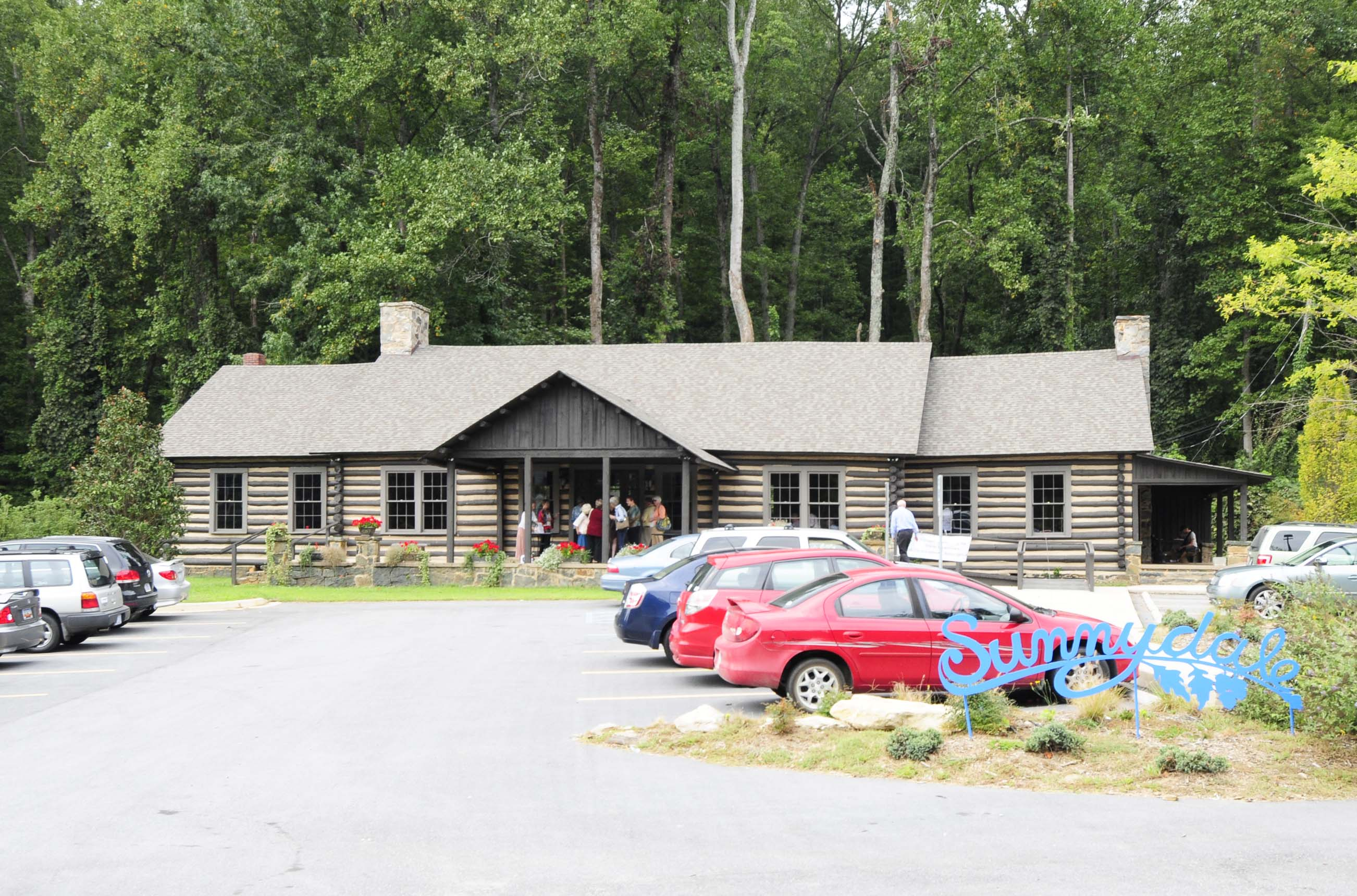
- Sunnydale, September 2012

- Location within North Carolina Location within the United States
- Location: 334 S. Trade St., Tryon, North Carolina
- Coordinates: 35°12′15″N 82°14′16″W
- Area: 0.59 acres (0.24 ha)
- Built: c. 1930
- Built by: Kell, J. S.
- Architect: Searles, J. Foster
- Architectural style: Rustic Revival
- NRHP reference No.: 11000890
- Added to NRHP: December 7, 2011

Sunnydale is a historic commercial building located at Tryon, Polk County, North Carolina. It was designed by architect J. Foster Searles and built about 1930. It is a one-story, five-bay, side-gable log building with flanking two-bay setback side-gable wings. It features an exterior stone chimney with an exterior fireplace and an attached one-story shed-roof side porch. It was originally built as an entertainment venue, which hosted dinners, dances, receptions, and theatrical performances. The building was renovated in 2010 and gifted to Tryon Little Theater late in 2011.

It was added to the National Register of Historic Places in 2011.
