= Mountain Home =

Mountain Home may refer to:

- Mountain Home (album), by Owen Temple
- Mountain Home (magazine), a Pennsylvania magazine

== Place names ==
- Mountain Home, Arkansas
- Mountain Home Village, California
- Mountain Home (Santa Clara County, California)
- Mountain Home Reservoir, Colorado
- Mountain Home, Idaho
  - Mountain Home Air Force Base
  - Mountain Home Post Office
- Mountain Home, North Carolina
- Mountain Home, Tennessee, home of the U.S. Veterans Affairs Medical Center and National Cemetery
- Mountain Home, Texas
- Mountain Home, Utah
- Mountain Home (Front Royal, Virginia), listed on the NRHP in Warren County, Virginia
- Mountain Home, West Virginia
- Mountain Home (White Sulphur Springs, West Virginia), a house listed on the National Register of Historic Places

== See also ==
- Mountain House (disambiguation)
