= Saluda, North Carolina =

- City
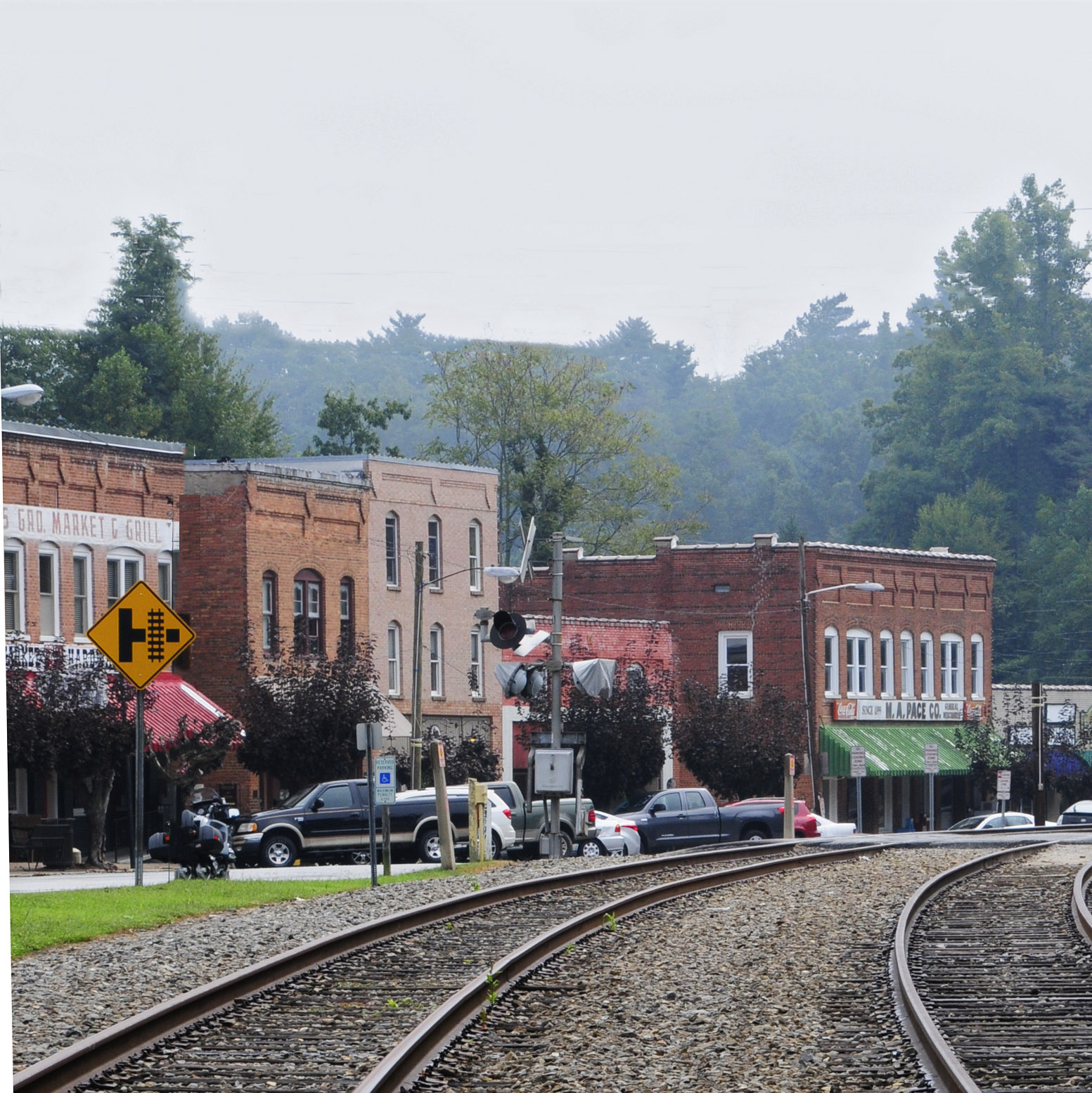

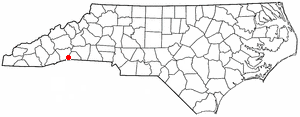
- Location of Saluda, North Carolina
- Coordinates: 35°14′15″N 82°20′49″W
- Country: United States
- State: North Carolina
- Counties: Polk, Henderson
- Settled: 1878
- Incorporated: 1881
- Named for: Tsaludiyi (ᏣᎷᏗᏱ)

Area
  - Total: 1.56 sq mi (4.03 km^{2})
  - Land: 1.56 sq mi (4.03 km^{2})
  - Water: 0 sq mi (0.00 km^{2})
- Elevation: 2,179 ft (664 m)

Population (2020)
  - Total: 631
  - Density: 405.7/sq mi (156.64/km^{2})
- Time zone: UTC-5 (Eastern (EST))
  - Summer (DST): UTC-4 (EDT)
- ZIP code: 28773
- Area code: 828
- FIPS code: 37-58920
- GNIS feature ID: 2405410
- Website: saluda.com

Saluda is a city in Polk and Henderson counties in the U.S. state of North Carolina. The population was 631 at the 2020 census. Saluda is famous for sitting at the top of the Norfolk Southern Railway's Saluda Grade, which was the steepest main line standard-gauge railway line in the United States until Norfolk Southern ceased operations on the line in 2001. Saluda is close to the South Carolina state line, between Asheville, North Carolina, and Spartanburg, South Carolina.

== History ==
Saluda's name came from the Cherokee word Tsaludiyi, meaning "green corn place". The first name of the area by European settlers was "Pace's Ridge", from the Pace family who inhabited the area. Many of the original families were Scots-Irish who left Pennsylvania around the time of the Whiskey Rebellion in the early 1790s.

Count Joseph Marie Gabriel St. Xavier de Choiseul, French consul to Charleston, South Carolina, and cousin to Louis Philippe I of France, bought land in 1831 from the Barings of nearby Flat Rock and built his home, Saluda Cottages.

In 1878, there were only two houses in the limits of present-day Saluda. The completion of the Southern Railroad that same year brought about a large change in Saluda. The Saluda railroad grade is unmatched by any main line east of the Rocky Mountains with a grade that drops 600 feet (180 m) to the mile. This included 50 curves, some horseshoe, and saved money by going over rather than through the mountains. This section of railroad was originally built as the Asheville and Spartanburg Railroad. The railroad was built with convict labor, which marked the first such use on a large scale, and was supervised by Colonel Andrew Tanner, who operated the first hotel in Saluda and was elected the first mayor of Saluda in 1881. In 1887, eight passenger trains passed through Saluda daily, with about 3,000 visitors a year. The Saluda Grade was infamous for runaway train accidents. In 1880 alone, fourteen men were killed on the 3-mile (5 km) stretch of track. Freight service along the line ended in December 2001 when Norfolk Southern suspended operations along the line between East Flat Rock, North Carolina and Landrum, South Carolina before severing this segment from the rest of its system in April 2003. Talks to convert this segment to passenger train excursion and a Rails-to-trails conversion made no headway in the 2000s and 2010s. In February 2023, Norfolk Southern agreed to sell 31 miles of the Saluda Grade to the Saluda Grade Trail Conservancy, which plans to convert the segment to a rail trail.

== Geography ==
Saluda is located in southwestern Polk County. Two small parts of the city extend west and north into Henderson County. The elevation on Main Street is 2,097 feet (639 m) above sea level, while the elevation at the bottom end of the Saluda Grade, in Tryon, is 1,080 feet (329.1 m).

U.S. Route 176 is Saluda's Main Street; the highway leads east down the mountain 8 miles (13 km) to Tryon and northwest 10 miles (16 km) to Hendersonville. Interstate 26 passes just north of Saluda, with access from Exit 59. I-26 leads north 34 miles (55 km) to Asheville and southeast 37 miles (60 km) to Spartanburg, South Carolina.

According to the United States Census Bureau, Saluda has a total area of 1.5 square miles (4.0 km^{2}), all land.

=== Geology and seismology ===
Saluda-area historical earthquake activity is significantly above the North Carolina state average but is 85% smaller than the overall U.S. average.

1. On November 30, 1973, at 07:48:41, a magnitude 4.7 (4.7 MB, 4.6 ML) earthquake occurred 98.9 miles away from the city center.
2. On August 2, 1974, at 08:52:09, a magnitude 4.9 (4.3 MB, 4.9 LG, Class: Light, Intensity: IV - V) earthquake occurred 94.8 miles away from the city center.
3. On August 25, 2005, at 03:09:42, a magnitude 3.6 (3.6 MW, Depth: 5.0 mi, Class: Light, Intensity: II - III) earthquake occurred 51.2 miles away from the city center.
4. On June 16, 2006, at 00:57:27, a magnitude 3.1 (3.1 LG, Depth: 2.9 mi) earthquake occurred 53.3 miles away from the city center.
5. On August 4, 2007, at 10:04:46, a magnitude 3.0 (3.0 LG, Depth: 5.8 mi) earthquake occurred 22.7 miles away from the city center.
6. On December 7, 2007, at 11:07:03, a magnitude 3.1 (3.1 LG, Depth: 3.1 mi) earthquake occurred 10.5 miles away from the city center.

== Demographics ==
Historical population
| Census | Pop. | Note | %± |
|---|---|---|---|
| 1900 | 211 | | — |
| 1910 | 235 | | 11.4% |
| 1920 | 549 | | 133.6% |
| 1930 | 558 | | 1.6% |
| 1940 | 539 | | −3.4% |
| 1950 | 547 | | 1.5% |
| 1960 | 570 | | 4.2% |
| 1970 | 546 | | −4.2% |
| 1980 | 607 | | 11.2% |
| 1990 | 488 | | −19.6% |
| 2000 | 575 | | 17.8% |
| 2010 | 713 | | 24.0% |
| 2020 | 631 | | −11.5% |
U.S. Decennial Census

=== 2020 census ===
Saluda racial composition
| Race | Number | Percentage |
|---|---|---|
| White (non-Hispanic) | 573 | 90.81% |
| Black or African American (non-Hispanic) | 17 | 2.69% |
| Asian | 2 | 0.32% |
| Other/Mixed | 22 | 3.49% |
| Hispanic or Latino | 17 | 2.69% |

As of the 2020 United States census, there were 641 people, 369 households, and 231 families residing in the city.

=== 2010 census ===
As of the 2010 Census, there were 713 people and 493 households with 310 currently occupied, 141 seasonal/recreational/occasional use houses, and 28 for sale/rent. The population density as of the 2000 census, was 369.1 people per square mile (142.3/km^{2}). The racial makeup was 95.65% White, 2.66% African American, 0.28% Asian, 0.28% American Indian and Alaska Native, and 0.98% from two or more races. Hispanic or Latino of any race were 1.96% of the population.

There were 265 households, out of which 20.8% had children under the age of 18 living with them, 52.5% were married couples living together, 7.9% had a female householder with no husband present, and 35.5% were non-families. 31.3% of all households were made up of individuals, and 13.2% had someone living alone who was 65 years of age or older. The average household size was 2.17 and the average family size was 2.70.

The City of Saluda was 43.76% male and 56.24% female. The population was 14.59% under the age of 18. The population over 18 was spread into five categories: 2.52% from age 18 to 24, 4.91% from 25 to 34, 17.11% from 35 to 49, 25.10% from 50 to 60, and 34.90% from age 65 and older.

The median income for a household in the city was $39,063, and the median income for a family was $47,188. Males had a median income of $37,917 versus $25,000 for females. The per capita income for the city was $25,149. About 3.8% of families and 4.6% of the population were below the poverty line, including 3.4% of those under age 18 and 6.1% of those age 65 or over.

== Government ==
The current mayor of Saluda as of 2021 is Tangie Morgan, a native of Saluda and prominent local merchant and civic volunteer. She was first elected in November, 2021. She defeated longtime mayor Fred Baisden by a wide margin.

The city council is composed of the mayor and commissioners: Mark Oxtoby, Paul Marion, Melanie Talbot, and Kevin Burnett.

== Attractions ==
The main street of Saluda is a hub of newly formed restaurants and art galleries. Tourists and cyclists are common on summer and fall weekends due to the many winding mountain roads located around Saluda. The main town festivals are the Saluda Arts Festival, Coon Dog Day, and the Home Town Christmas Celebration. The nearby Green River includes some of the most challenging whitewater in the eastern U.S. and is host to the annual Green River Games kayak race the first weekend in November.

=== Festivals ===
The Saluda Arts Festival is an event in which fine artists from all over western North Carolina and South Carolina exhibit and sell oil paintings, watercolors, acrylic paintings and drawings, woodworking, photography, pottery, jewelry, sculptures, stained glass, and metal working. The festival also offers live demonstrations of landscape painting, weaving, pottery, and blacksmithing. It is typically held the third Saturday in May.

The Coon Dog Day festival is one of the oldest festivals in Saluda. It is a homecoming and celebration which includes food, live music, a parade, crafts, and a street dance. The festival also includes a 5k race and a benefit breakfast at the Saluda Masonic Lodge. It is held the first Saturday after July 4 each year.

For the Saluda Home Town Christmas festival, Main Street is decked out in Christmas lights and holiday decorations. Businesses and shops are open and serve holiday refreshments while local musicians perform. The open house and musical events are closed with an ecumenical service delivered by Saluda ministers at the Saluda Presbyterian Church.

=== Shopping ===
The majority of shops are located on Main Street. Other businesses are located in Nostalgia Court.

=== Parks and forests ===
The Saluda Community Land Trust manages parks and develops trails including the Lazy Girl Loop, Tryon Missing Trace 40, Little Park, and a Community Garden. A small park with a playground and picnic shelter borders the railroad tracks on Main Street. The Saluda Dog Park is on Chestnut Street.

=== Waterfalls ===
There are 5 main waterfalls near the city: Pearson's Falls, Melrose Falls, Big Bradley Falls, Heaven Leigh Falls, and Little Bradley Falls.

== Education ==
Saluda Elementary is the public elementary school in Saluda, located on Main Street, serving grades pre-kindergarten through 5.

== Notable people ==
- Pierino Ronald "Perry" Como (/ˈkoʊmoʊ/; May 18, 1912 – May 12, 2001) was an American singer, actor, and television personality. During a career spanning more than half a century, he recorded exclusively for RCA Victor for 44 years, from 1943 until 1987. Having enjoyed golfing and fishing in the North Carolina mountains for several years, Como built a vacation home in Saluda, North Carolina, in 1980. He discouraged photos of his home, as it was his private place to get away from celebrity life.

- Lillian Mosseller (1915–2012), visual artist, and rug maker
