= Polk County, North Carolina =

County in North Carolina, United States

- County
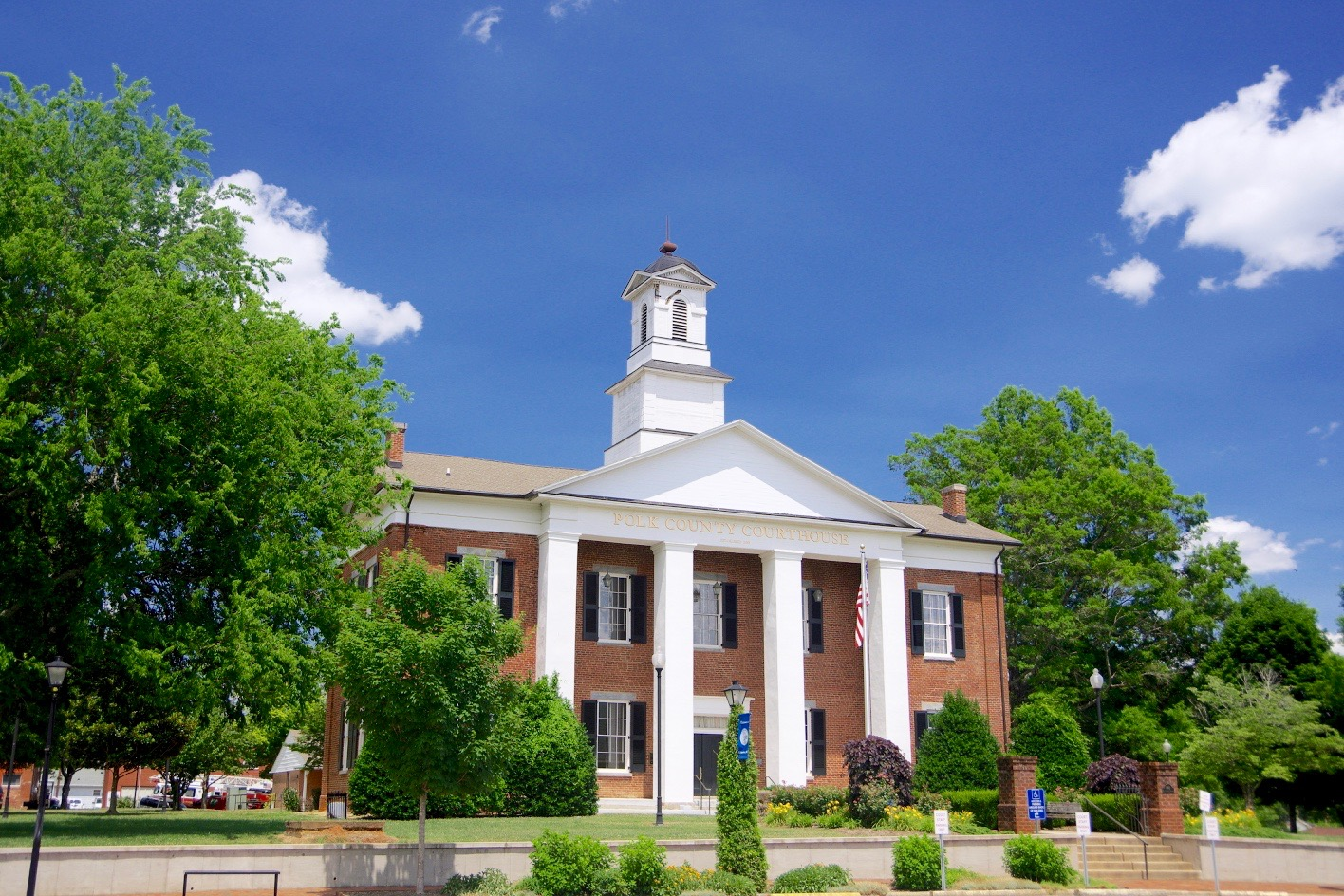
- Polk County Courthouse

- Flag Seal

- Location within the U.S. state of North Carolina
- Coordinates: 35.28°N 82.17°W
- Country: United States
- State: North Carolina
- Founded: 1855
- Named for: Colonel William Polk
- Seat: Columbus
- Largest municipality: Tryon

Area
  - Total: 238.45 sq mi (617.6 km^{2})
  - Land: 237.69 sq mi (615.6 km^{2})
  - Water: 0.76 sq mi (2.0 km^{2}) 0.32%

Population (2020)
  - Total: 19,328
  - Estimate (2025): 20,533 ▲
  - Density: 81.316/sq mi (31.396/km^{2})
- Time zone: UTC−5 (Eastern)
  - Summer (DST): UTC−4 (EDT)
- Congressional districts: 11th, 14th
- Website: www.polknc.gov

Polk County is a county located in the U.S. state of North Carolina. As of the 2020 census, the population was 19,328. Its county seat is Columbus.

== History ==
The county was formed in 1855 from parts of Henderson and Rutherford counties. It was named for William Polk, a colonel in the American Revolutionary War. The Tryon International Equestrian Center, close to the community of Mill Spring was the location of the 2018 FEI World Equestrian Games.

== Geography ==
Interactive map of Polk County

According to the U.S. Census Bureau, the county has a total area of 238.45 square miles (617.6 km^{2}), of which 237.69 square miles (615.6 km^{2}) is land and 0.76 square miles (2.0 km^{2}) (0.32%) is water. It is the fifth-smallest county in North Carolina by total area.

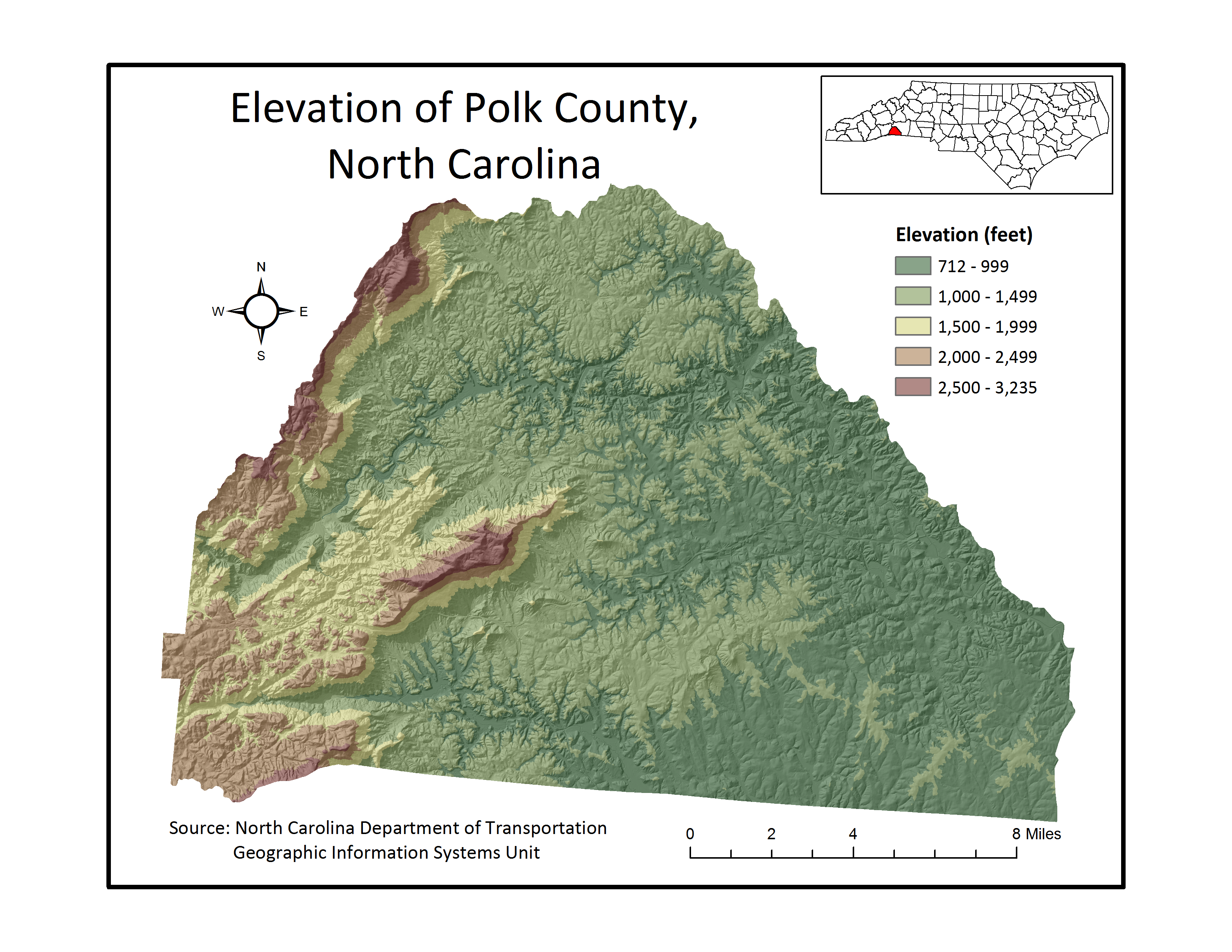
Polk County Elevation

The county's largest body of water is Lake Adger, located about 5 miles (8.0 km) north of Columbus. Lake Adger is a reservoir formed by the damming of the Green River, which flows from west to east across the county. The northern extent of the river's watershed forms the northern border of the county.

The elevation in the county ranges from just under 800 feet (240 m) near the confluence of the Green River and Broad River to over 3,200 feet (980 m) on Tryon Peak and Wildcat Spur, the highest peak in the county. Polk County is divided into two physiographic regions; the Blue Ridge Mountains in the western third of the county and Piedmont for the eastern two-thirds. Since it is in a transition zone between the two regions, Polk County is often referred to as being in the foothills.

=== State and local protected areas ===
- Anne Elizabeth Suratt Nature Center
- Bradley Nature Preserve at Alexander's Ford (part)
- Chimney Rock State Park (part)
- Green River Game Lands (part)
- Pearson's Falls
- Shunkawauken Falls

=== Major water bodies ===
- Broad River
- Colt Creek
- Cove Creek
- Green River
- North Pacolet River
- Hughes Creek
- Lake Adger
- Little White Oak Creek
- Ostin Creek
- Vaughns Creek
- Walnut Creek
- White Oak Creek

=== Adjacent counties ===
- Rutherford County – northeast
- Spartanburg County, South Carolina – south-southeast
- Greenville County, South Carolina – south-southwest
- Henderson County – west

=== Major highways ===
- I-26
- US 74
- US 176
- NC 9
- NC 108

The interchange for I-26 and the US 74 freeway is located in Columbus. Interstate 26 provides Polk County with access to Asheville and Spartanburg, South Carolina.

Polk County is also served by an additional non-freeway U.S. Highway: US 176. This was the primary highway linking Saluda and Tryon to Hendersonville and Spartanburg, SC. prior to the delayed completion of I-26 in 1976. Two North Carolina routes, NC 108 and NC 9, traverse the county as well. NC 108 begins in Rutherfordton and travels west through Columbus and ends at US 176 in Tryon. Oriented north-to-south, NC 9 connects Black Mountain and Lake Lure to Spartanburg and points southeast via Polk County. NC 108 and NC 9 intersect at the unincorporated town of Mill Spring.

Polk County and Saluda are infamous among railroad enthusiasts for the Saluda Grade, the steepest standard-gauge mainline railway grade in the United States. Norfolk Southern suspended freight traffic indefinitely along this route in December 2001. The track remains in place, but are cut near Flat Rock, North Carolina and Landrum, South Carolina.

== Demographics ==
Historical population
Census	Pop.	Note	%±
1860	4,043		—
1870	4,319		6.8%
1880	5,062		17.2%
1890	5,902		16.6%
1900	7,004		18.7%
1910	7,640		9.1%
1920	8,832		15.6%
1930	10,216		15.7%
1940	11,874		16.2%
1950	11,627		−2.1%
1960	11,395		−2.0%
1970	11,735		3.0%
1980	12,984		10.6%
1990	14,416		11.0%
2000	18,324		27.1%
2010	20,510		11.9%
2020	19,328		−5.8%
2025 (est.)	20,533	▲	6.2%
U.S. Decennial Census; 1790–1960 1900–1990; 1990–2000 2010 2020

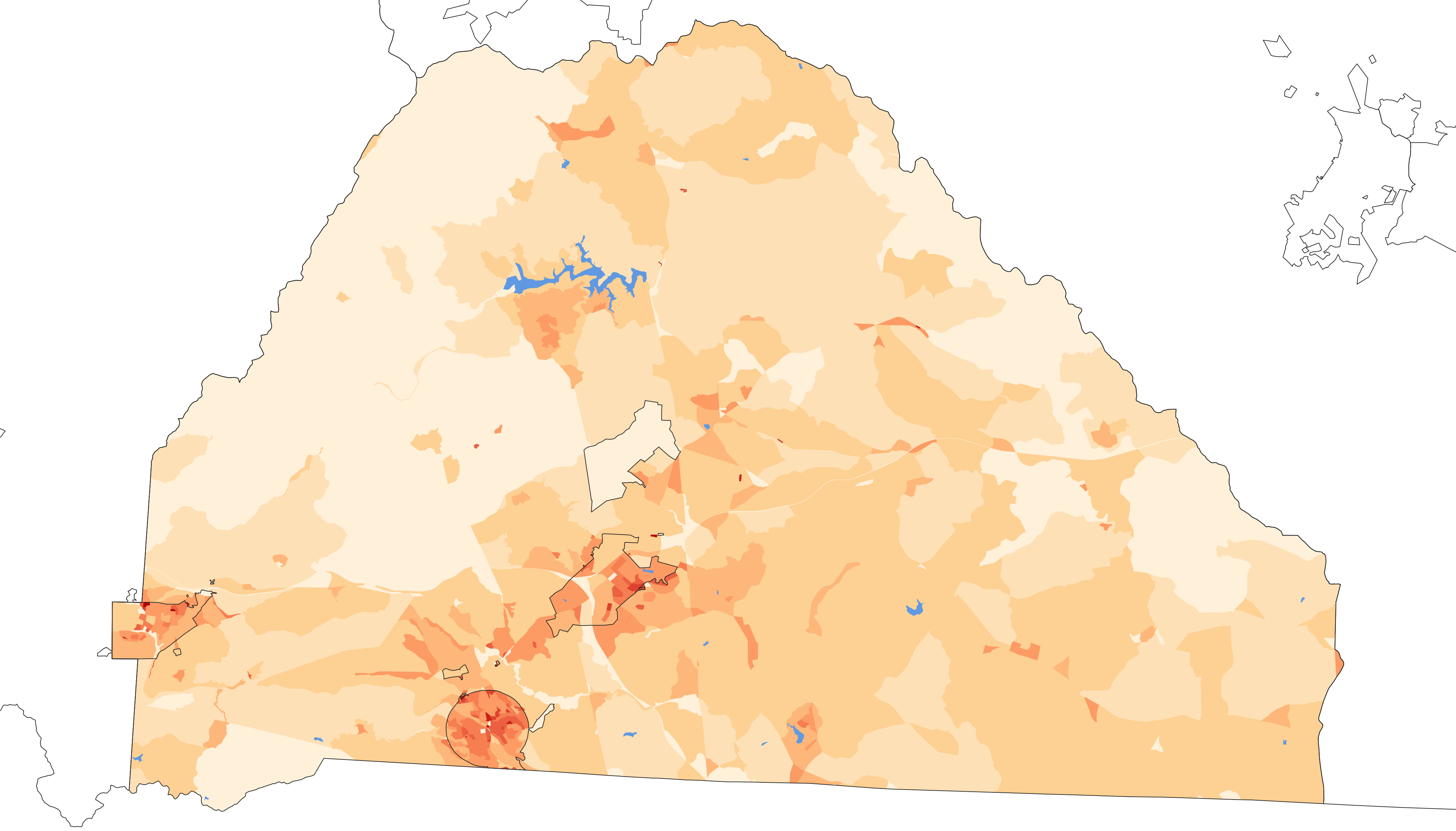
2020 population density of Polk County NC by census block

=== Racial and ethnic composition ===
Polk County, North Carolina – Racial and ethnic composition Note: the US Census treats Hispanic/Latino as an ethnic category. This table excludes Latinos from the racial categories and assigns them to a separate category. Hispanics/Latinos may be of any race.
Race / Ethnicity (NH = Non-Hispanic)	Pop 1980	Pop 1990	Pop 2000	Pop 2010	Pop 2020	% 1980	% 1990	% 2000	% 2010	% 2020
White alone (NH)	11,669	13,201	16,504	18,126	16,716	89.87%	91.57%	90.07%	88.38%	86.49%
Black or African American alone (NH)	1,168	1,053	1,061	911	689	9.00%	7.30%	5.79%	4.44%	3.56%
Native American or Alaska Native alone (NH)	18	17	28	41	51	0.14%	0.12%	0.15%	0.20%	0.26%
Asian alone (NH)	17	25	39	60	60	0.13%	0.17%	0.21%	0.29%	0.31%
Native Hawaiian or Pacific Islander alone (NH)	x	x	4	1	7	x	x	0.02%	0.00%	0.04%
Other race alone (NH)	5	5	20	14	41	0.04%	0.03%	0.11%	0.07%	0.21%
Mixed race or Multiracial (NH)	x	x	117	235	738	x	x	0.64%	1.15%	3.82%
Hispanic or Latino (any race)	107	115	551	1,122	1,026	0.82%	0.80%	3.01%	5.47%	5.31%
Total	12,984	14,416	18,324	20,510	19,328	100.00%	100.00%	100.00%	100.00%	100.00%

=== 2020 census ===
As of the 2020 census, there were 19,328 people in the county; the median age was 53.8 years, 16.2% of residents were under the age of 18, 31.9% were 65 years of age or older, for every 100 females there were 91.8 males, and for every 100 females age 18 and over there were 89.9 males age 18 and over.

The racial makeup of the county was 87.6% White, 3.6% Black or African American, 0.4% American Indian and Alaska Native, 0.3% Asian, 0.1% Native Hawaiian and Pacific Islander, 2.3% from some other race, and 5.7% from two or more races; Hispanic or Latino residents of any race comprised 5.3% of the population.

8.6% of residents lived in urban areas, while 91.4% lived in rural areas.

There were 8,538 households in the county, of which 20.5% had children under the age of 18 living with them. Of all households, 49.9% were married-couple households, 16.9% were households with a male householder and no spouse or partner present, and 28.0% were households with a female householder and no spouse or partner present. About 31.9% of all households were made up of individuals and 18.6% had someone living alone who was 65 years of age or older.

There were 10,775 housing units, of which 20.8% were vacant. Among occupied housing units, 75.7% were owner-occupied and 24.3% were renter-occupied. The homeowner vacancy rate was 2.0% and the rental vacancy rate was 7.5%.

=== 2000 census ===
At the 2000 census, there were 18,324 people, 7,908 households, and 5,337 families residing in the county. The population density was 77 people per square mile (30 people/km^{2}). There were 9,192 housing units at an average density of 39 units per square mile (15 units/km^{2}). The racial makeup of the county was 92.26% White, 5.89% Black or African American, 0.19% Native American, 0.24% Asian, 0.03% Pacific Islander, 0.63% from other races, and 0.76% from two or more races. 3.01% of the population were Hispanic or Latino of any race.

There were 7,908 households, out of which 23.50% had children under the age of 18 living with them, 56.30% were married couples living together, 7.90% had a female householder with no husband present, and 32.50% were non-families. 28.90% of all households were made up of individuals, and 15.00% had someone living alone who was 65 years of age or older. The average household size was 2.28 and the average family size was 2.78.

In the county, the population was spread out, with 20.10% under the age of 18, 5.80% from 18 to 24, 24.20% from 25 to 44, 26.30% from 45 to 64, and 23.60% who were 65 years of age or older. The median age was 45 years. For every 100 females there were 90.20 males. For every 100 females age 18 and over, there were 87.10 males.

The median income for a household in the county was $36,259, and the median income for a family was $45,096. Males had a median income of $29,375 versus $23,070 for females. The per capita income for the county was $19,804. 10.10% of the population and 6.40% of families were below the poverty line. 11.70% of those under the age of 18 and 8.80% of those 65 and older were living below the poverty line.

=== Ancestry/ethnicity ===
As of the 2000 census, the largest self-reported ancestry/ethnicity groups in Polk County were:

Ancestry/ethnicity	Percent (2000)
English (England)	17%
German (Germany)	13%
Irish (Republic of Ireland)	13%
Scotch-Irish (Ulster)	7.0%
African American (United States)	5.89%
Scottish (Scotland)	4.0%
Italian (Italy)	3.0%

== Law and government ==
Polk County is a member of the Isothermal Planning and Development Commission regional council of governments. Sheila Whitmire is the current (as of 2012) Registrar of Deeds.

== Government and politics ==
United States presidential election results for Polk County, North Carolina
Year	Republican		Democratic		Third party(ies)	
Year	No.	%	No.	%	No.	%
1912	153	11.50%	675	50.75%	502	37.74%
1916	750	52.45%	679	47.48%	1	0.07%
1920	1,326	49.35%	1,361	50.65%	0	0.00%
1924	1,445	47.05%	1,613	52.52%	13	0.42%
1928	1,873	53.68%	1,616	46.32%	0	0.00%
1932	1,421	36.98%	2,401	62.48%	21	0.55%
1936	1,794	41.58%	2,521	58.42%	0	0.00%
1940	1,528	38.37%	2,454	61.63%	0	0.00%
1944	1,678	41.76%	2,340	58.24%	0	0.00%
1948	1,636	40.99%	2,078	52.07%	277	6.94%
1952	2,561	48.30%	2,741	51.70%	0	0.00%
1956	2,823	52.77%	2,527	47.23%	0	0.00%
1960	2,856	50.84%	2,762	49.16%	0	0.00%
1964	2,765	47.82%	3,017	52.18%	0	0.00%
1968	2,550	45.89%	1,523	27.41%	1,484	26.71%
1972	3,121	67.31%	1,416	30.54%	100	2.16%
1976	2,605	44.82%	3,155	54.28%	52	0.89%
1980	3,021	53.86%	2,375	42.34%	213	3.80%
1984	4,046	64.73%	2,169	34.70%	36	0.58%
1988	3,874	60.31%	2,534	39.45%	15	0.23%
1992	3,448	45.77%	2,939	39.02%	1,146	15.21%
1996	3,516	52.04%	2,704	40.02%	536	7.93%
2000	5,074	61.11%	3,114	37.50%	115	1.39%
2004	5,140	56.98%	3,787	41.98%	94	1.04%
2008	5,990	56.71%	4,396	41.62%	176	1.67%
2012	6,236	60.03%	4,013	38.63%	140	1.35%
2016	6,768	61.90%	3,735	34.16%	431	3.94%
2020	7,689	62.22%	4,518	36.56%	151	1.22%
2024	8,107	62.04%	4,827	36.94%	134	1.03%

Polk County is notable as one of only two counties in the country that voted for Charles Evans Hughes in 1916 and for James M. Cox in 1920 the other one is Manistee County, Michigan.

=== 2016 elections ===
In the 2016 Republican Primary in Polk County, Donald Trump received 1,624 votes (or 46.2% of the total votes) followed by Ted Cruz who came in second with 1,135 votes (or 32.3% of the total votes). In the 2016 Democratic Primary, Bernie Sanders received 1,123 votes (48.7% of the total) whereas Hillary Clinton won 1,099 votes (47.7% of the total). In the general election Donald Trump received 6,768 votes (or 61.9% of the total vote) whereas Hillary Clinton received 3,735 votes (34.2% of the vote) and Libertarian candidate Gary Johnson received 272 votes (2.5% of total votes in the county).

== Communities ==
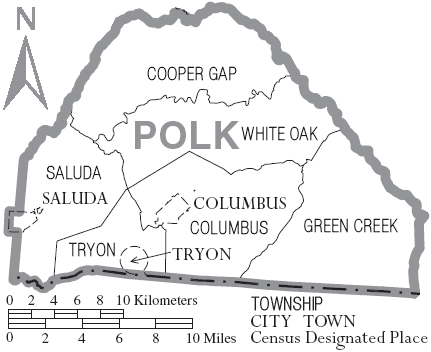
Map of Polk County with municipal and township labels

=== City ===
- Saluda (also in Henderson County)

=== Towns ===
- Columbus (county seat)
- Tryon (largest municipality)

=== Townships ===
- Columbus
- Cooper Gap
- Green Creek
- Saluda
- Tryon
- White Oak

=== Unincorporated communities ===
- Lynn
- Mill Spring

== See also ==
- List of counties in North Carolina
- National Register of Historic Places listings in Polk County, North Carolina
