= Bear Wallow =

Bear Wallow or Bearwallow may refer to:

- Bear Wallow, Kentucky (disambiguation), three towns in Kentucky
- Bearwallow, North Carolina, an unincorporated community
- Bear Wallow Wilderness
- Bearwallow Creek
- Bearwallow Mountain Lookout Cabins and Shed

== See also ==
- Wallowing in animals
