= Dana, North Carolina =

- Census-designated place
- Location within North Carolina Location within the United States
- Coordinates: 35°19′32″N 82°23′08″W
- Country: United States
- State: North Carolina
- County: Henderson
- Named after: Dana Hadley

Area
  - Total: 8.93 sq mi (23.12 km^{2})
  - Land: 8.90 sq mi (23.06 km^{2})
  - Water: 0.023 sq mi (0.06 km^{2})
- Elevation: 2,238 ft (682 m)

Population (2020)
  - Total: 3,683
  - Density: 413.6/sq mi (159.69/km^{2})
- Time zone: UTC-5 (Eastern (EST))
  - Summer (DST): UTC-4 (EDT)
- ZIP code: 28724
- Area code: 828
- GNIS feature ID: 2584314
- FIPS code: 37-16220

Dana is an unincorporated community and census-designated place (CDP) in Henderson County, North Carolina, United States. As of the 2020 census, Dana had a population of 3,683.

== History ==
A post office called Dana has been in operation since 1892. The community was named for Dana Hadley, the son of the original owner of the town site.

== Geography ==
Dana is in eastern Henderson County, with the town center sitting at an elevation of 2,256 feet (688 m) above sea level on the Eastern Continental Divide. The eastern half of the community drains to the Hungry River and is part of the Green River–Broad River–Congaree River–Santee River system flowing to the Atlantic Ocean, while the western half of Dana flows towards Mud Creek, part of the French Broad River–Tennessee River–Mississippi River system flowing to the Gulf of Mexico.

Dana is 5 miles (8 km) east of Hendersonville, the county seat, and 28 miles (45 km) southeast of Asheville. According to the U.S. Census Bureau, the Dana CDP has a total area of 8.9 square miles (23.1 km^{2}), of which 0.02 square miles (0.06 km^{2}), or 0.26%, are water.

== Demographics ==
Historical population
Census	Pop.	Note	%±
2020	3,683		—
U.S. Decennial Census

=== 2020 census ===
As of the 2020 census, Dana had a population of 3,683. The median age was 39.0 years. 24.5% of residents were under the age of 18 and 17.8% of residents were 65 years of age or older. For every 100 females there were 106.0 males, and for every 100 females age 18 and over there were 103.7 males age 18 and over.

71.1% of residents lived in urban areas, while 28.9% lived in rural areas.

There were 1,343 households in Dana, of which 31.5% had children under the age of 18 living in them. Of all households, 55.0% were married-couple households, 15.9% were households with a male householder and no spouse or partner present, and 23.2% were households with a female householder and no spouse or partner present. About 24.1% of all households were made up of individuals and 12.9% had someone living alone who was 65 years of age or older.

There were 1,463 housing units, of which 8.2% were vacant. The homeowner vacancy rate was 0.9% and the rental vacancy rate was 4.5%.

Racial composition as of the 2020 census
Race	Number	Percent
White	2,625	71.3%
Black or African American	49	1.3%
American Indian and Alaska Native	11	0.3%
Asian	16	0.4%
Native Hawaiian and Other Pacific Islander	38	1.0%
Some other race	642	17.4%
Two or more races	302	8.2%
Hispanic or Latino (of any race)	951	25.8%
