= Henderson County Public Schools =

US school district

Location
- Henderson County, North Carolina Western North Carolina United States

District information
- Type: Public
- Grades: K–12
- Established: 1993
- Superintendent: Mark R. Garrett
- Schools: 23
- Budget: $126,720,294
- NCES District ID: 3702100

Students and staff
- Students: 13,521
- Teachers: 1,520 (full time)

Other information
- Website: www.hendersoncountypublicschoolsnc.org

Henderson County Public Schools (also called Henderson County Schools) is a K–12 graded school district serving Henderson County, North Carolina. The district was formed in 1993 from the merger of Hendersonville City Schools and the former Henderson County Schools. Its 23 schools serve 13,472 students as of the 2010–11 school year.

== History ==
The system was created on July 1, 1993, by the merger of Hendersonville City Schools and Henderson County Schools. They adopted the new name Henderson County Public Schools.

== Student demographics ==
For the 2016-17 school year, Henderson County Public Schools had a total population of 13,521 students, 1,520 full-time teachers, 361 part-time teachers, and 1,155 substitutes. That same year, out of the total student population, the demographic group makeup was: White, 66.1%; Hispanic, 23.77%; Black, 4.09%; two or more races, 4.05%; American Indian, 0.16%; Asian, 1.27%; and Pacific Islander, 0.55%. For the same school year, 57.24% of the students received free and reduced-cost lunches.

== Governance ==
The primary governing body of Henderson County Public Schools is called the Henderson County Board of Public Education. It follows a council–manager government format with a seven-member Board of Education appointing a Superintendent to run the day-to-day operations of the system. The school system currently resides in the North Carolina State Board of Education's Eighth District.

=== Board of education ===
The seven members of the Board of Education generally meet on the second Monday of each month. The current members of the board are: Amy Lynn Holt (Chair), Rick R. Wood (Vice-Chair), Michael Absher, Blair Craven, Mary Louise Corn, and Lisa Edwards.

=== Superintendent ===
The system has had six superintendents since merging, and is currently searching for a seventh. The first was Dan G. Lunsford who was also superintendent of the county system before the merger. He served from 1993 until 1999 when Tom Burnham was appointed. Burnham held the position 1999–2004. Stephen L. Page took over in 2004 and served until 2010. David L. Jones was appointed in 2010 after Page's retirement, and served until 2016. Hardy "Bo" Caldwell served from 2016-2020, and served under Jones as Assistant Superintendent of Administrative Services. Dr. John Bryant then served from 2020 to 2022.

== Member schools ==
Henderson County Schools has 23 schools ranging from kindergarten to twelfth grade. These are separated into four traditional high schools, a career academy, an early college, four middle schools, and thirteen elementary schools.

=== High schools ===
- Henderson County Career Academy; located in Innovative High Schools building on Blue Ridge Community College campus (East Flat Rock)
- Henderson County Early College; located in Innovative High Schools building on Blue Ridge Community College campus (East Flat Rock)
- East Henderson High School (East Flat Rock)
- Hendersonville High School (Hendersonville)
- North Henderson High School (Hendersonville)
- West Henderson High School (Hendersonville)

=== Middle schools ===
- Apple Valley Middle School [North Henderson]
- Flat Rock Middle School [East Henderson]
- Hendersonville Middle School [Hendersonville]
- Rugby Middle School [West Henderson]

=== Elementary schools ===
- Atkinson Elementary School [East Henderson]
- Bruce Drysdale Elementary School [Hendersonville]
- Clear Creek Elementary School [North Henderson/Hendersonville/West Henderson]
- Dana Elementary School [North Henderson/East Henderson]
- Edneyville Elementary School [North Henderson]
- Etowah Elementary School [West Henderson]
- Fletcher Elementary School [West Henderson/Hendersonville/North Henderson]
- Glenn C. Marlow Elementary School [West Henderson]
- Hendersonville Elementary School [Hendersonville]
- Hillandale Elementary School [East Henderson]
- Mills River Elementary School [West Henderson]
- Sugarloaf Elementary School [North Henderson/Hendersonville/East Henderson]
- Upward Elementary School [East Henderson]

== Athletics ==
Athletic departments for the district schools are members of the North Carolina High School Athletic Association. They compete in various sports over two different conferences. East, North, and West are all in the Western North Carolina Athletic Conference. East and West are 3A schools, while North is 2A. Hendersonville is a 1A school in the Western Highlands Conference.

== Awards ==
The Henderson County Public School system has had one school listed as a Blue Ribbon School: Hendersonville Elementary School in 2007.

== See also ==
- List of school districts in North Carolina
