= Bluerock Mountain (North Carolina) =

Mountain in North Carolina, United States

- Bat Cave Mountain
- Location within North Carolina

Highest point
- Elevation: 2,835 ft (864 m)
- Coordinates: 35°26′15″N 82°16′41″W

Geography
- Location: Henderson and Rutherford counties, North Carolina, U.S.
- Parent range: Blue Ridge Mountains
- Topo map: USGS Bat Cave

Bluerock Mountain is a mountain in Western North Carolina, near the community of Bat Cave. It is split between Henderson and Rutherford counties, it is home of the Bat Cave Preserve and part of Chimney Rock State Park. Its elevation reaches 2,835 feet (864 m).

The mountain is flanked by the Broad River to its north and Reedypatch Creek to its west. To its south is Rich Mountain and to the east is Chimney Rock Mountain. Paris Gap is the gap between it and Bald Mountain, it connects the community of Bat Cave and the town of Chimney Rock via Lake Lure Highway (US 64/US 74A/NC 9).

== Bat Cave Reserve ==
The Rutherford County half is protected lands within the Chimney Rock State Park. Home of the Bat Cave, named after the several species of bats that inhabit the cave, it is protected as a reserve and not open to the public. The Bat Cave is the largest known granite fissure cave in North America.
