= Flat Rock Playhouse =

Theater in North Carolina, United States

Coordinates: 35.273907°N 82.443380°W

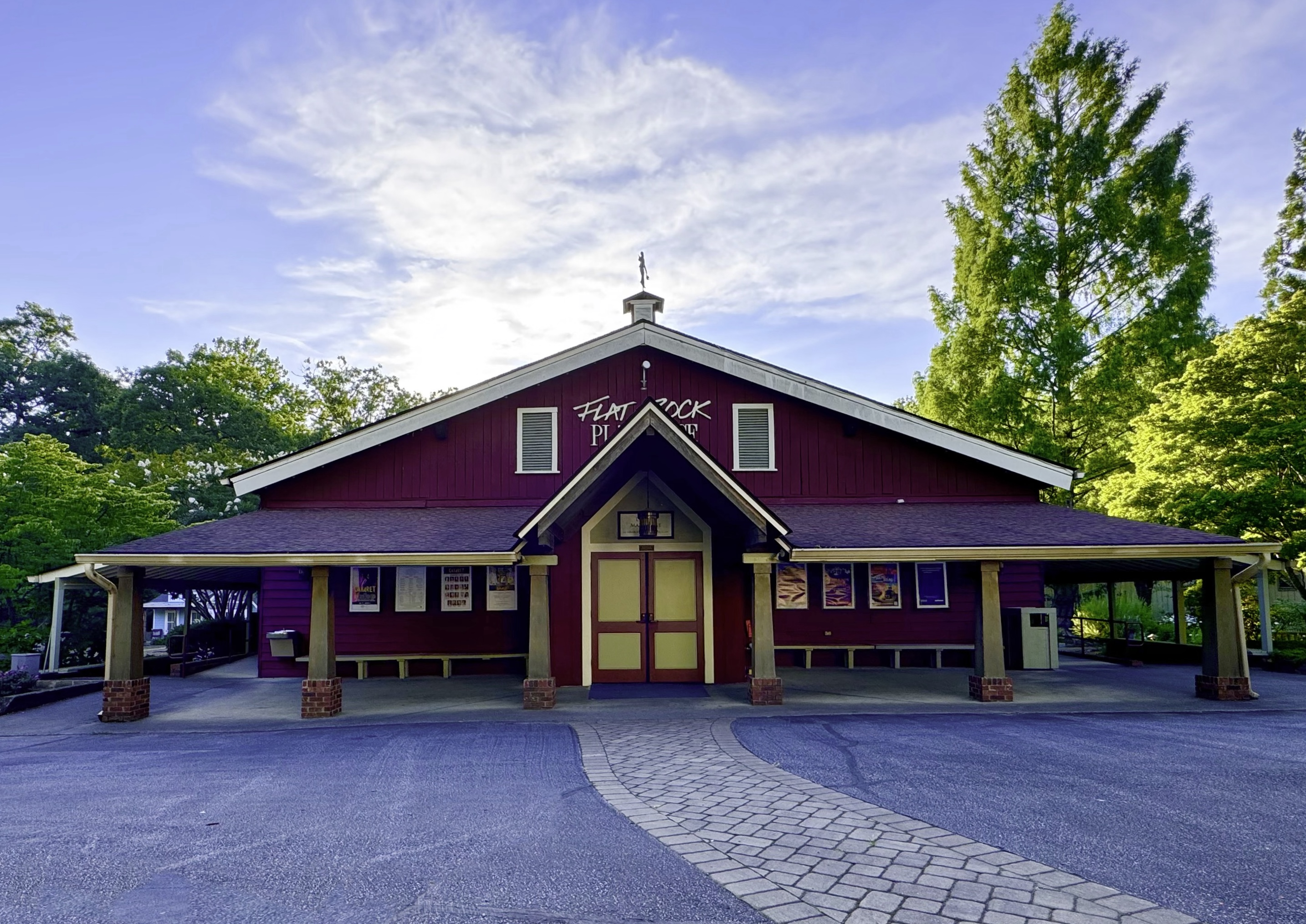
Flat Rock Playhouse is the state theatre of North Carolina

Flat Rock Playhouse is a professional, non-profit theatre located in the village of Flat Rock, NC known for quality productions of popular musicals, comedies, and dramas. In 1961, the theatre was named the State Theatre of North Carolina by the North Carolina General Assembly.

== History ==
In 1937, under the direction of Robroy Farquhar, a group of actors in New York City organized themselves as the Vagabond Players and read plays for performance. In 1939, the troupe performed in Bedford Springs, Pennsylvania, for the summer.

Farquhar came to Hendersonville, N.C., in 1940 and discovered a 150-year-old grist mill at Highland Lake Camp. He opened a playhouse inside the former mill for the summer. After the group's 1941 season, Farquhar was drafted into the U.S. Army for World War II and the theatre business was put on hold.

Following the war, in 1946, the troupe took up residence in nearby Tuxedo and opened a playhouse at Lake Summit for a series of 10 plays in 10 weeks over the summer. In 1952, the group moved to an 8-acre area of land in Flat Rock, where the theatre is currently located. A big-top tent was rented for use as a venue; the property was purchased in 1956 and a theatre was built that year.

In 1962, "The World of Carl Sandburg" premiered at Flat Rock Playhouse before moving to Broadway. Farquhar's son Robin took his father's place managing the theatre in 1983, three years before his dad's death. Robin died in 2008.

As of 2002, the 500-seat Flat Rock Playhouse had an annual budget of $2.2 million and 17 full-time employees. In 2011, the theatre opened a 250-seat theatre-in-the-round satellite venue in downtown Hendersonville. As of 2024, the Flat Rock Playhouse has a nine-month-long season and hosts more than 100,000 visitors each year.

== Notable performers ==
- Rosemary Prinz
- Burt Reynolds
