= East Henderson High School =

American public school in North Carolina

Location
- 150 Eagle Pride Dr; East Flat Rock, North Carolina 28726; United States; 35°17′51″N 82°25′27″W

Information
- School district: Henderson County Public Schools
- Category: Public
- CEEB code: 341335
- NCES School ID: 370210000915
- Principal: Brandon Scott
- Teaching staff: 60.97 (FTE)
- Grades: 9–12
- Enrollment: 968 (2023-2024)
- Student to teacher ratio: 15.88
- Colors: Green and white
- Website: hendersoncountypublicschoolsnc.org/ehh/

East Henderson High School is a public high school in East Flat Rock, North Carolina. The school was built in 1960. As of the 2016–2017 school year the student population was 905 with 64 classroom teachers. East Henderson High is part of the Henderson County Public Schools district. The school serves students in grades nine through twelve. The mascot is an eagle and the colors are green, white and unofficially, black. The school is located at 150 Eagle Pride Drive in East Flat Rock. It is commonly known as "East" by residents in Hendersonville/Flat Rock and surrounding areas.

== In popular culture ==
School was used as a filming location in the Walt Disney Studios film Heavyweights in 1994.
