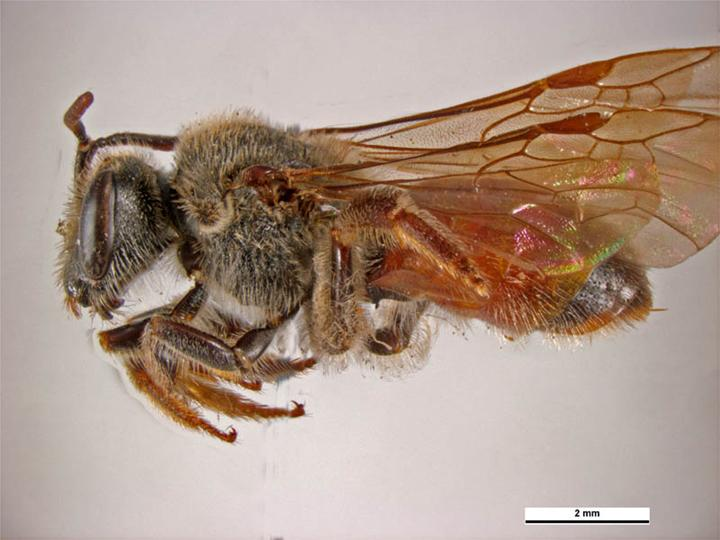
- Female
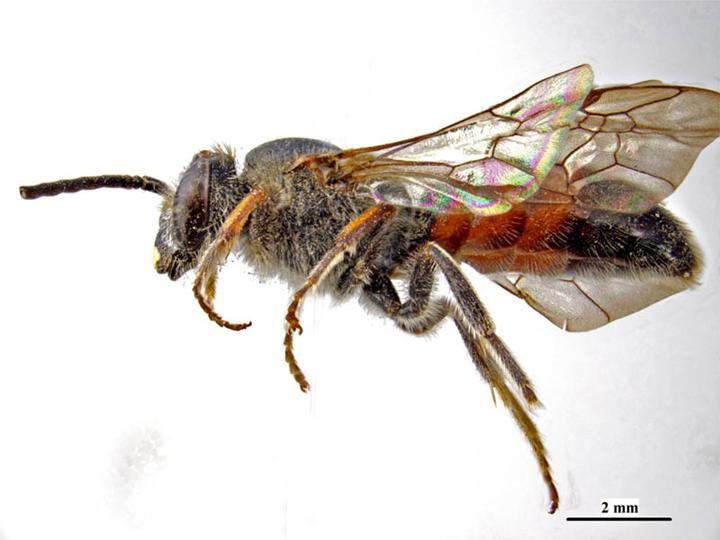
- Male

Scientific classification
- Kingdom: Animalia
- Phylum: Arthropoda
- Clade: Pancrustacea
- Class: Insecta
- Order: Hymenoptera
- Family: Halictidae
- Genus: Lasioglossum
- Species: L. excultum

Binomial name
- Lasioglossum excultum (Cockerell, 1913)

Synonyms
- Parasphecodes excultus Cockerell, 1913; Parasphecodes wilmattae Cockerell, 1929

= Lasioglossum excultum =

Species of bee

Lasioglossum excultum, or Lasioglossum (Parasphecodes) excultum, is a species of bee in the family Halictidae and subfamily Halictinae. It is endemic to Australia. It was described by British-American entomologist Theodore Dru Alison Cockerell in 1913.

== Description ==
Female body length is about 9 mm. Head, thorax and legs are black, abdomen black and red.

== Distribution and habitat ==
The species occurs in south-eastern Australia. Type localities include Jenolan, New South Wales; and Magnet, Lea, in Tasmania.

== Behaviour ==
The adults are flying mellivores. Flowering plants visited by the bees include Goodenia, Eucalyptus, Leptospermum and Hakea species.
