= Camp Arrowhead (Tuxedo, North Carolina) =

Historic district in North Carolina, United States

- U.S. National Register of Historic Places
- U.S. Historic district
- Location within North Carolina Location within the United States
- Location: Cabin Creek Rd., 1 mile (1.6 km) west of junction with Green River Rd., near Tuxedo, North Carolina
- Coordinates: 35°12′47″N 82°28′34″W
- Area: 50 acres (20 ha)
- Built: 1919
- Built by: Coggins, Raymond; Morgan, Burgin
- Architectural style: Rustic
- NRHP reference No.: 05001415
- Added to NRHP: December 16, 2005

Camp Arrowhead, also known as Camp Glen Arden after 1972, is a historic summer camp and national historic district located near Tuxedo, Henderson County, North Carolina. It was established in 1919 by the Green River Manufacturing Company as a recreational facility, and became a boy's summer camp in 1937. The district encompasses 18 contributing buildings, one contributing site, and five contributing structures. Notable Rustic Revival style contributing buildings include the Recreation Hall/Gymnasium (#1919; alterations 1941; ca. 1940s); the group of log cabins dating from the original use of the camp by the Green River Manufacturing Company (1919); Ramshackle Cabin (1937); the Dining Hall/Kitchen (1941; alterations c. 1946); Mansion Cabin (c. 1946); and the Horse Barn (1953).

It was listed on the National Register of Historic Places in 2005.

In 1990, Camp Glen Arden took over the historic property, and the Bell Family moved Camp Arrowhead to a 200 acre location 1 mile into the woods.

== Present-day camp ==
The new camp property continues to operate as a private summer camp under the name Camp Arrowhead for Boys, a boys-only overnight camp located on Cabin Creek Road near Tuxedo/Zirconia in the Blue Ridge Mountains of North Carolina. The modern camp operates as a boys-only residential program where campers participate in traditional camp activities and outdoor trips, and it includes a one-week "Maker Camp" session for older boys that emphasizes hands-on creative projects and skills.

Camp Arrowhead for Boys is owned and directed by Max and Alli King, with John Bates serving as co-owner and staffing director. The camp markets itself as a screen-free environment focused on confidence, leadership, outdoor adventure, and creative, hands-on learning.
