= Fruitland, North Carolina =

Fruitland, North Carolina may refer to the following places in North Carolina:

- Fruitland, Henderson County, North Carolina, a census-designated place
- Fruitland, Richmond County, North Carolina, an unincorporated community
