= Hoopers Creek, North Carolina =

- Census-designated place
- Location within North Carolina Location within the United States
- Coordinates: 35°26′53″N 82°25′46″W
- Country: United States
- State: North Carolina
- County: Henderson

Area
  - Total: 6.95 sq mi (18.01 km^{2})
  - Land: 6.94 sq mi (17.98 km^{2})
  - Water: 0.012 sq mi (0.03 km^{2})
- Elevation: 2,267 ft (691 m)

Population (2020)
  - Total: 1,074
  - Density: 154.8/sq mi (59.75/km^{2})
- Time zone: UTC-5 (Eastern (EST))
  - Summer (DST): UTC-4 (EDT)
- Area code: 828
- GNIS feature ID: 2584321
- FIPS code: 37-32580

Hoopers Creek is an unincorporated community and census-designated place (CDP) in Henderson County, North Carolina, United States. As of the 2020 census, Hoopers Creek had a population of 1,074.

== Geography ==
The community is in northern Henderson County, bordered to the west by the town of Fletcher and to the north by Buncombe County. The CDP is in the valley of Hoopers Creek, a west-flowing tributary of Cane Creek and part of the French Broad River watershed. The 2,983-foot (909 m) summit of Burney Mountain is on the northern border of the CDP, and 3,693-foot (1,126 m) Bank Mountain is on the southern border.

Asheville is 14 miles (23 km) north of Hoopers Creek via Mills Gap Road, and Hendersonville is 10 miles (16 km) to the south via Jackson Road and Howard Gap Road.

According to the U.S. Census Bureau, the Hoopers Creek CDP has a total area of 7.0 square miles (18.1 km^{2}), of which 0.01 square miles (0.03 km^{2}), or 0.17%, are water.

== Demographics ==
Historical population
Census	Pop.	Note	%±
2020	1,074		—
U.S. Decennial Census
