= Lake Summit, North Carolina =

Lake in Henderson County, North Carolina

Lake Summit
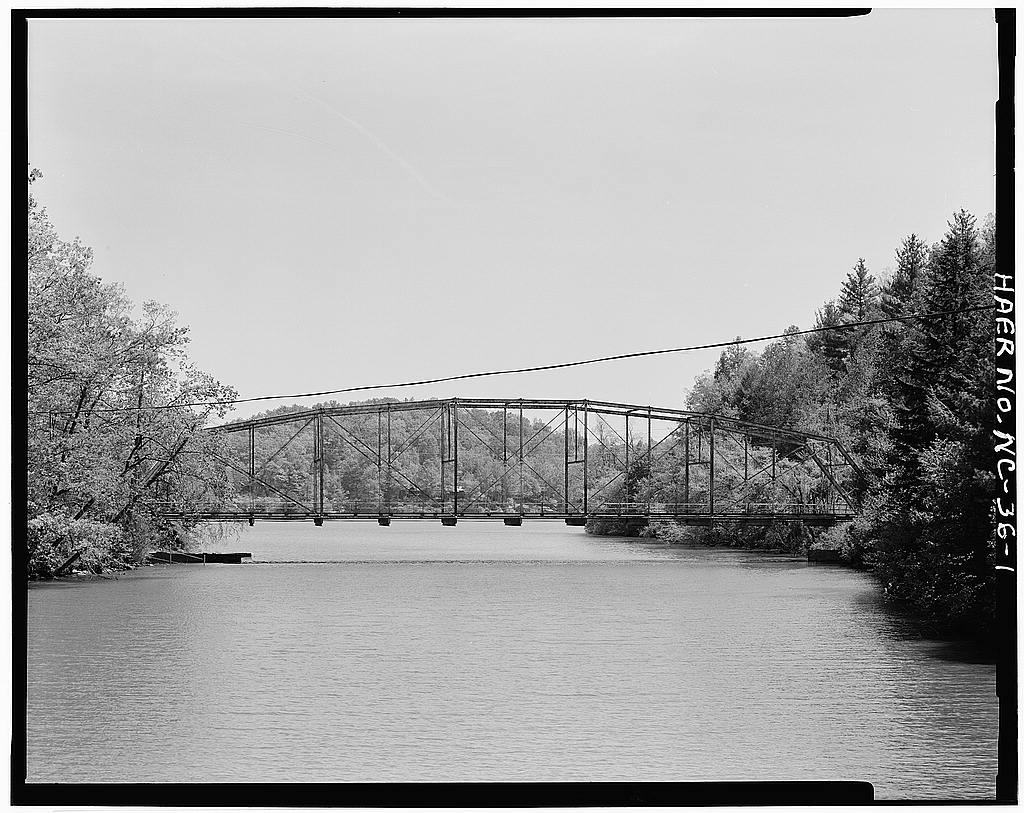
- Lake Summit, 1968

- Location within North Carolina Location within the United States
- Location: Henderson county, North Carolina, United States
- Coordinates: 35.2249°N 82.4198°W
- Primary inflows: Green River
- Basin countries: United States
- Designation: Private lake with water access
- Surface area: 16,600 acres (67 km^{2})
- Average depth: 20 ft (6.1 m)
- Max. depth: 107 ft (33 m)
- Islands: Rabbit Island
- Settlements: Tuxedo

Lake Summit is a hydroelectric dammed reservoir in Henderson County, in the U.S. state of North Carolina. It has a surface area of 324 acres (1.31 km^{2}). It is the largest lake in Henderson County.

== History ==
The Green River was dammed in 1920 by the Blue Ridge Power Company, now part of Duke Energy, to provide power for Henderson County and the Greenville area, creating Lake Summit. Prior to the damming, the land now under the water was occupied by some small number of family homes and a gristmill; these were demolished or moved as part of the construction process. The land around the lake was parceled up and sold to families. In 1921, a bridge was constructed across the midsection of the lake. In 1983, the state DOT replaced the old truss bridge crossing the river with a new concrete bridge nearby, preserving the old bridge as a walking path.

== Recreation ==
The lake is private access and managed by the Lake Summit Property Owners Association. Boaters must be residents of shorefront properties along the lake or have a permit for access; this includes all motor propelled boats, personal watercraft, and smaller water vessels, such as kayaks and canoes.

== See also ==
- Lake Lure
- Lake Adger
