= Narrows of the Green =

Coordinates: 35°16′46″N 82°20′47″W

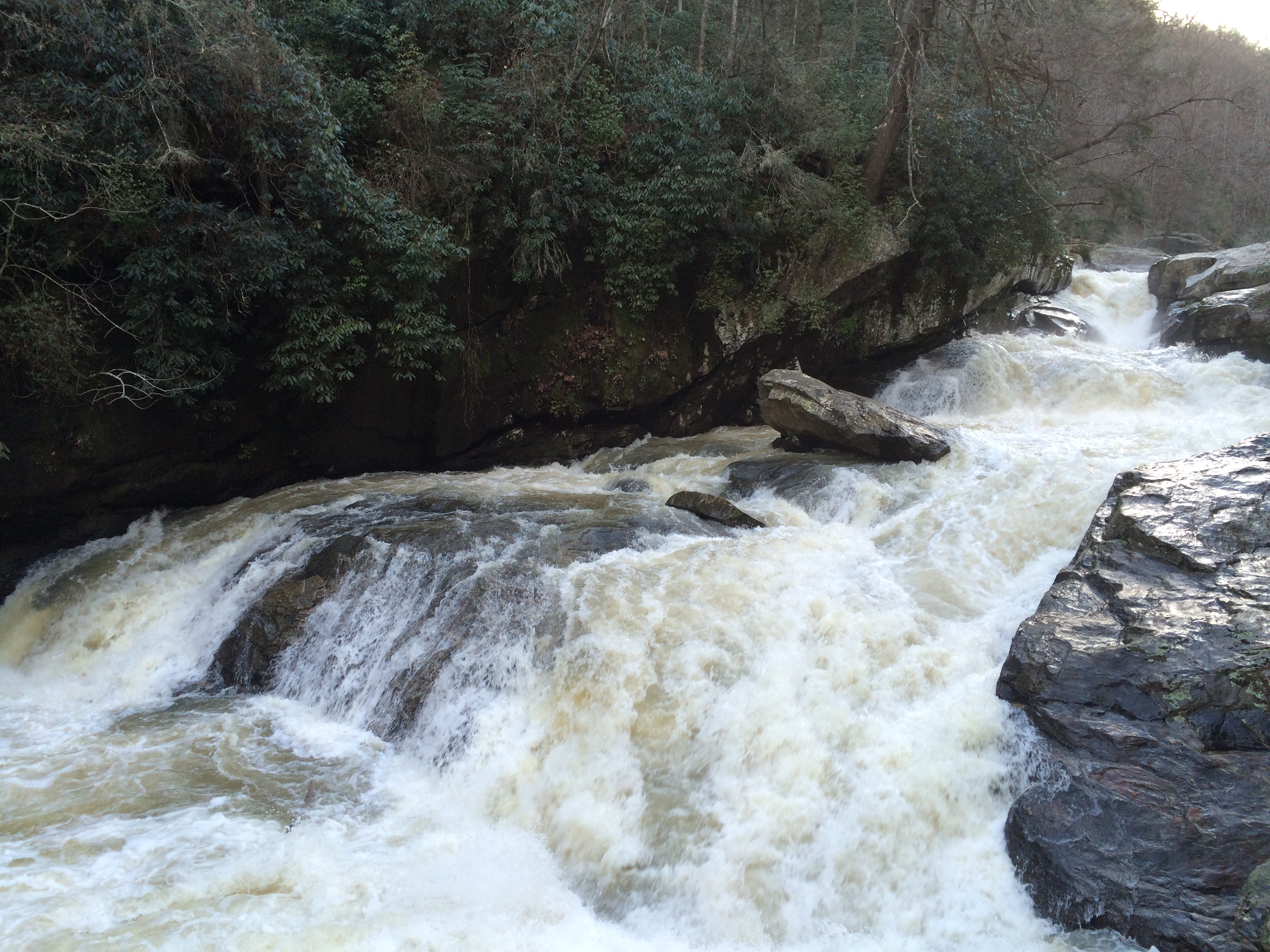
Green River Narrows

The Narrows of the Green is a 2.9-mile (4.7 km) section of the Green River in Henderson County and Polk County, between the Big Hungry Creek confluence and the Fishtop access area, in western North Carolina, United States. It is roughly 35 miles (56 km) south of downtown Asheville. Locals simply call it “The Narrows”.

== White water kayaking ==
The Green Narrows is one of the most extreme kayaking runs in the Eastern US. Water is released on a regular basis from the Tuxedo Power Station with a 100% release being equivalent to 216 cubic feet per second (6.1 m^{3}/s). This regular flow allows for year-round kayaking and hence makes it a popular destination for whitewater kayakers and canoeists.

The river has an average gradient of 178 feet per mile (33.7 m/km, or 3%), with a half-mile (800 m) section dropping roughly 342 feet (104 m) and containing 11 major class IV+ to V+ rapids. Through this area, the water often channels through extremely tight slots as narrow as 4 feet (1.2 m) wide as the river funnels through a stunning gorge. The three major rapids on the river ("The Big Three") are called "Go Left and Die", "Gorilla" and "Sunshine". Gorilla is considered the most visually impressive rapid on the river. It consists of the river funneling into a 4-foot (1.2 m)-wide slot ("The Notch") and is then immediately followed by an 18-foot (5.5 m) waterfall ("the flume") and then another 10-foot (3.0 m) waterfall ("Scream Machine"). Sunshine is considered the most difficult and dangerous rapid and consists of a 14-foot (4.3 m) waterfall landing on a jagged rock shelf below. The river gets considerably more difficult at higher water levels; however, the Green has been run at up to 300% flows (over 30" on the stick gauge).

On the first Saturday of November, many paddlers arrive at the Green to participate in the annual Green Race.

In 1906, the river was nearly dammed in four places (instead of the one dam upstream built around 1921). The engineers for the four-dam concept were Ladshaw and Ladshaw from Spartanburg, SC, and the now-annual celebration of man's failure to advance is called "Ladshaw Day".
