= Camp Greystone =

Christian summer camp in North Carolina, US

Coordinates: 35.220337°N 82.435151°W

Camp Greystone

Camp Greystone is a Christian summer camp for girls located near Tuxedo, North Carolina, in the Blue Ridge Mountains in western North Carolina. The camp offers sessions ranging in length from 1 week to 5 weeks for girls ages 5–17. Sessions begin in late May and continue through mid-August.

== History ==
Greystone was founded in 1920 by Dr. Joseph R. Sevier and his wife Edith. Before founding the camp, Dr. Sevier was the minister at First Presbyterian Church in Augusta, Georgia. The camp originally started on Greystone Mountain in Tennessee in 1920, however, after exploring the Blue Ridge Mountains, Dr. Sevier found a permanent location for the camp in Tuxedo, North Carolina. When Dr. Sevier died in 1945, he passed the camp leadership on to his daughter, Virginia, and her husband, Joe Hanna. The Hannas led the camp through the 1950s and 1960s. The camp was then passed on to the Hanna's daughter Libby Hanna Miller and her husband Jim Miller III. Libby used to serve as the senior director at the camp, until she died on September 19, 2017. Jim died January 29, 2010. Their son, Jim Miller IV (known by campers and staff as "Jimboy") and his wife, Dr. Margaret Broadbent Miller, currently own and run the camp. Jim received his Master of Divinity from Reformed Theological Seminary in Charlotte, North Carolina. Dr. Margaret Miller serves as the camp's Health Director and is a board certified pediatrician.

== Campers ==
Camp Greystone serves over 1850 campers each summer. Campers live with 8–12 other girls in cabins with one or two counselors. These cabins are called different things depending on their size and the age group they house. The order from smallest to largest is tentalows, bungalows, and cabins. The oldest girls live in the Palace or the Castle, two groups of cabins that are larger and have more amenities, such as two showers instead of one.

Greystone is structured around a fourfold philosophy of nurturing the spiritual, physical, mental, and social development of young girls. Camp Greystone has a 98% return rate each summer, as well as a waiting list that can take years to get off of.

== Activities, Traditions, Evening Programs and Meals ==
During the one-week Junior camp session, campers travel with their counselor to a number of different activities. During the three-week June camp session and five-week Main camp session, campers choose 14 activities to take during the summer. Two-week August camp campers register for 7 activities.

Greystone offers water activities in its 3 to 8 ft (2.4 m). pool, 10 to 12 ft (3.7 m). pool, and lake front areas. These activities include sailing, kayaking, competitive swimming, diving, rowing, waterpark, synchronized swimming, lap swim, swimming lessons, water polo, water aerobics, and many, many more.

Greystone offers different artistic programs in its 6,000 sq ft (560 m^{2}). Fine Arts Center. These activities include metal jewelry, crafts, ceramics, glass beads, glass fusion, scrapbooking, sewing, knitting, painting, and printmaking.

Greystone offers active and non-active land activities, including tennis, soccer, basketball, track, cross country, softball, volleyball, prep sports, lacrosse, field hockey, ballet, tap, jazz, gymnastics, tumbling, fencing, fitness, high adventure, high ropes, summer reading, creative writing, French, Spanish, cooking, guitar, riflery, archery, dog camp, drama, modeling, dance team, juggling, jump rope, card games, and more.

Campers can also register for special activities, which they take in addition to their everyday activities. Greystone's riding program offers private lessons, group lessons, and trail rides. Campers can also register for rafting trips throughout the summer. Campers raft at the Pigeon River in Tennessee or at the Chattooga River in South Carolina, and ride at the camp's own 60 horse barn. There is also another smaller barn for trail rides.

Greystone is known for its many traditions, some old and some newer. Just a few include wearing whites on Sundays and for special events, singing songs after meals in the dining hall, recognizing achievements at Council Fire, listening for bugles and bells to run the daily schedule, the "Odds" versus "Evens" session-long competition (odd-numbered cabins wear green, while even-numbered cabins wear yellow), saluting the flag before breakfast and dinner, turning the "Job Wheel" each day to determine cabin chores, watching for the Apple Cart during third-period activities, lighting candles at Opening & Closing Vespers, and the end-of-summer Banquet (a themed play the counselors put on and keep secret from the campers throughout the session).

Evening Programs (known at camp as "EPs") begin after dinner and range from cabin lip syncs and a talent show to Corn Roast, Carnival and Movie Night.

Greystone's food is popular among campers and counselors alike. The kitchen staff prepare everything from scratch, including fresh "Greystone Bread" daily. Many of Greystone's kitchen and cooking class recipes are listed on their website.

== Recognitions ==
Greystone was featured in Life Magazine in 1941 in an article titled "Life Goes Calling at Camp Greystone." Greystone was also featured in the 1956 Ties: The Southern Railway System Magazine in an article "All Aboard for Summer Camp," which featured Greystone campers traveling via train to attend for the summer.

More recently, Town & Country magazine photographed Greystone and its campers for its July 1992 article titled "The Boys and Girls of Summer." Thomas Nebbia, retired National Geographic photographer and book illustrator, visited the camp in 2008 to photograph a natural take of camp life.
