= Mountain Page, North Carolina =

- Unincorporated community
- Interactive map of Mountain Page, North Carolina
- Country: United States
- State: North Carolina
- County: Henderson
- Elevation: 2,178 ft (664 m)
- Time zone: UTC-5 (Eastern (EST))
  - Summer (DST): UTC-4 (EDT)
- Area code: 828
- GNIS feature ID: 990702

Mountain Page is an unincorporated community in Henderson County, North Carolina, United States. It is in the southeastern edge of the county. The ZIP code is 28773 with a Saluda address even though Saluda is in neighboring Polk County. Mountain Page is named after the local Page family. The community backs up to the Greenville Watershed in neighboring Greenville County, South Carolina. The community is 12 mi (19 km) south of Hendersonville, North Carolina the county seat. Mountain Page is a part of the Asheville Metropolitan Area.
