= North Fork Championship =

The North Fork Championship was a whitewater kayaking extreme race located on the North Fork of the Payette River, just north of Banks, Idaho. The North Fork of the Payette River is one of the most well known class V rivers in the world, most notably for the extremely continuous big water. The first race was held in 2012 and has become an annual race. The North Fork Championship, or NFC, on or around the second weekend in June and brings the best whitewater kayakers from around the world to race down the infamous rapid called “Jacob's Ladder”. The NFC is unique in the sense that it takes an extremely dangerous and difficult rapid, and forces the racers to make different maneuvers in the rapid that are very challenging and that they wouldn't normally choose to run. After just one year, American Canoe and Kayak named the North Fork Championship as the 2013 Sanctioned Event of the Year, since then it has attracted even more top level kayakers from around the globe.

== Race Format ==
=== Elite Race ===
The main event of the weekend on Saturday is the Elite Race on Jacobs Ladder. To race down Jacob's Ladder, one must be invited in one of three different ways: take top 5 in the Expert Race (the qualifier), be previously voted in as one of 15 racers by The Trick Force, or be part of The Trick Force (the top 10 finishers in the previous years race). To be voted in, paddlers must submit an application, stating why they believe they are capable of racing, as well as why they should be invited.

The Elite Race is an extreme slalom time trial. Each racer goes down the course one at a time to have the fastest time, while also navigating around “gates” that are determined by the organizers to make the racers do challenging and difficult maneuvers. Failure to go on the correct side of the gate results in a 50-second penalty, and touching the gate results in a 5-second penalty. Each racer gets 2 runs down the course, and the fastest time is recorded for the results.

=== Expert Race ===
The Expert Race serves as the race that allows anyone that is capable of paddling the whitewater. It is held down on the S-Turn Rapid, located on the "Upper 5" section on the North Fork. This race was previously held on the "Lower 5" section of the river during the first few years. S-Turn is a class V rapid, but more manageable for a wider variety of people compared to Jacob's Ladder. Over 150 racers go one at a time to have the fastest raw time. Motivation can be to just get out and race, beat their friends, or try and qualify for the Elite Race.

=== Boater X ===
The Boater X is a head to head race locate on a rapid called S-turn. The top 35 racers from the Expert Race, along with the invited Elite division are allowed to compete in this race. The Boater X is not timed, it is just simply a tournament style head to head, with the top half of the racers in each heat moving on to the next round.

== Results ==
=== 2012: NFC I ===
Elite Division

Place	Rider	Bib	Time
1	Ryan Casey	8	02:17.410
2	Tyler Bradt	12	02:18.530
3	Mikkel St. Jean Duncan	9	02:18.790
4	Wilz Martin	05	02:18.910
5	Geoff Calhoun	2	02:19.250
6	Pat Keller	30	02:19.540
7	Ben Marr	14	02:20.970
8	Evan Garcia	5	02:22.750
9	Jakub Nemec	7	02:25.900
10	Fred Coriell	18	02:34.310
11	Kyle Hull	4	02:35.06
12	Rush Sturges	13	02:36.84
13	Jonny Meyers	17	02:51.65
14	Tristan McClaran	22	02:54.35
15	Lane Jacobs	21	03:02.75
16	Andrew Holcombe	3	03:12.69
17	Chris Gragtmans	16	03:16.12
18	Darren Albright	02	03:17.50
19	Jesse Murphy	20	03:19.16
20	Dan Menten	11	03:22.56
21	Chris Mctaggert	06	03:32.78
22	Dan Simenc	19	03:39.84
23	Ryan Lucas	15	03:48.44
24	Ben Luck	01	04:08.53
25	Mira Kodada	10	05:56.00
	Zach Fraysier	03	DNF

=== 2013: NFC II ===
Elite Division

Place	Rider	Bib	Time
1	Louis Geltman	16	01:57.20
2	Gerd Serrasolses	11	01:59.81
3	Rush Sturges	12	01:59.84
4	Evan Garcia	8	02:00.88
5	Andrew Holcombe	14	02:01.16
6	Todd Wells	13	02:02.78
7	Ryan Casey	1	02:10.28
8	James Byrd	20	02:10.31
9	Jules Domine	17	02:13.38
10	Kyle Hull	19	02:14.36
11	Lane Jacobs	03	02:16.79
12	Chris Gragtmans	15	02:17.48
13	Ben Marr	7	02:25.38
14	Brian Ward	21	02:25.42
15	Ian McClaran	24	02:37.46
16	Geoff Calhoun	5	02:39.41
17	Eric Deguil	01	02:51.67
18	Dylan Thomson	18	02:57.12
19	Mikkel St. Jean Duncan	3	02:59.10
20	Ben Luck	22	03:01.20
21	Jakub Nemec	9	03:01.50
22	Tristan McClaran	25	03:04.45
23	Erik Johnson	23	03:37.99
24	Darren Albright	02	03:55.20
25	Marcos Gallegos	05	04:42.40

=== 2015: NFC IV ===
Elite Division

Place	Rider	Bib	Time
1	Gerd Serrasolses	4	2:05.50
2	Dane Jackson	9	2:06.29
3	Isaac Levinson	12	2:07.42
4	Aniol Serrasolses	15	2:08.94
5	Alec Voorhees	13	2:11.19
6	Tren Long	03	2:14.13
7	Todd Wells	5	2:15.89
8	Nouria Newman	23	2:16.02
9	Kyle Hull	14	2:16.30
10	Kalob Grady	16	2:16.67
11	Andrew Holcombe	7	2:17.93
12	Louis Geltman	18	2:17.98
13	Nick Troutman	10	2:18.39
14	Brendan Wells	05	2:19.63
15	Erik Johnson	24	2:19.66
16	Galen Volckhausen	22	2:20.28
17	Eric Deguil	11	2:21.31
18	Rush Sturges	6	2:25.53
19	Tyler Bradt	17	2:28.43
20	Liam Fournier	25	2:29.23
21	Nathan Garcia	19	2:32.43
22	Seth Stoenner	20	2:32.49
23	Joey Simmons	01	2:33.16
24	Jules Domine	1	3:08.49
25	Brad McMillan	02	3:13.07
26	Eric Parker	21	3:13.22
	Ryan Mooney	04	
	Egor Voskoboynikov	2	
	Evan Garcia	3	
	Joe Morley	8	

=== 2014: NFC III ===
Elite Division

Place	Rider	Bib	Time
1	Jules Domine	9	01:59.18
2	Egor Voskoboynikov	21	02:02.52
3	Evan Garcia	4	02:03.20
4	Gerd Serrasolses	2	02:04.63
5	Todd Wells	6	02:05.34
6	Rush Sturges	3	02:05.79
7	Andrew Holcombe	5	02:05.98
8	Joe Morley	14	02:06.27
9	Dane Jackson	13	02:09.49
10	Nick Troutman	25	02:10.12
11	Aniol Serrasolses	19	02:10.20
12	Ryan Casey	7	02:11.85
13	Bryan Kirk	12	02:12.36
14	Eric Deguil	17	02:13.75
15	Seth Stoenner	22	02:13.79
16	Galen Volckhausen	15	02:19.78
17	Erik Johnson	16	02:23.77
18	Momo Castillo	03	02:37.86
19	Louis Geltman	1	02:51.14
20	Alec Voorhees	04	02:55.79
21	Pangal Andrade Astorga	01	03:01.53
22	James Byrd	8	03:03.45
23	Geoff Calhoun	05	03:06.60
24	Isaac Levinson	24	03:09.07
25	Ben Marr	18	03:10.13
26	Brendan Wells	20	03:18.64
27	Brian Ward	23	03:22.02
28	Katrina Van Wijk	11	03:24.89
	Kyle Hull	10	DNS
	Tren Long	02	DNS

=== 2016: NFC V ===
Elite Division

Place	Rider	Bib	Time
1	Dane Jackson	2	1:57.60
2	Tad Dennis	16	1:58.28
3	Kyle Hull	9	1:59.00
4	Alec Voorhees	5	2:00.31
5	Aniol Serrasolses	4	2:00.53
6	Joe Morley	11	2:01.67
7	Nick Troutman	12	2:08.90
8	William Griffith	18	2:10.35
9	Rush Sturges	17	2:10.71
10	Evan Moore	03	2:11.82
11	Isaac Levinson	3	2:11.93
12	Kalob Grady	10	2:14.35
13	Tren Long	6	2:16.61
14	Sam Ellis	05	2:17.10
15	Dave Fusilli	21	2:18.01
16	Brendan Wells	15	2:18.09
17	Nouria Newman	8	2:27.66
18	Will Pruett	19	2:49.08
19	Todd Wells	7	2:50.72
20	Galen Volckhausen	20	2:54.52
21	Matias Lopez	02	2:54.09
22	Louis Geltman	13	2:56.18
23	Ben Kinsella	26	2:57.71
24	Phil Mitchell	04	3:03.60
25	Pat Keller	14	3:06.40
26	Aaron Mann	24	3:06.78
27	Pedro Andrade Astorga	01	3:15.73
28	Ben Marr	25	3:29.01
29	Sam Grafton	23	4:09.55
