= Hendersonville High School (North Carolina) =

American public school in North Carolina

Location
- 1 Bearcat Boulevard; Hendersonville, North Carolina 28791; United States; 35°19′16″N 82°27′51″W

Information
- School type: Public
- Motto: Dedicated to the Sanctity of Child Personality
- Established: 1901 (125 years ago)
- School district: Henderson County Public Schools
- CEEB code: 341800
- Principal: Dr. John McDaris
- Teaching staff: 46.67 (FTE)
- Enrollment: 785 (2023-2024)
- Student to teacher ratio: 16.82
- Campus type: Urban
- Colors: Red and white
- Mascot: Bearcats
- Website: hendersoncountypublicschoolsnc.org/hhs/

Hendersonville High School is a high school located in Hendersonville, North Carolina. The school is adjacent to Margaret R. Pardee Memorial Hospital and Highway 25.

== Overview and history ==
Hendersonville High School is a public school that was chartered in 1901 and then moved into its present facility in 1926. The site of this school was once a plum thicket.

== Grade range ==
Hendersonville High School serves grades 9 through 12.

== Schedule ==
Students in Hendersonville High School attend seven classes per day, one home room class, and one lunch break. This school's schedule type is inconsistent with other area schools who operate on the "block" system. If a minimum of 24 credits are earned, seniors may excuse the final two periods of the day. Junior and senior students may take classes offered at Blue Ridge Community College if they earn and maintain a GPA of 3.0 or above, or get a guidance reference.
