= Bear Wallow, Kentucky =

Bear Wallow, Kentucky may refer to:

- Bear Wallow, Barren County, Kentucky, an unincorporated community
- Bear Wallow, Morgan County, Kentucky, an unincorporated community
- Bear Wallow, Washington County, Kentucky, an unincorporated community
