= Fruitland, Henderson County, North Carolina =

- Census-designated place
- Location within North Carolina Location within the United States
- Coordinates: 35°23′34″N 82°24′43″W
- Country: United States
- State: North Carolina
- County: Henderson

Area
  - Total: 8.07 sq mi (20.91 km^{2})
  - Land: 8.04 sq mi (20.83 km^{2})
  - Water: 0.031 sq mi (0.08 km^{2})
- Elevation: 2,556 ft (779 m)

Population (2020)
  - Total: 2,257
  - Density: 280.7/sq mi (108.36/km^{2})
- Time zone: UTC-5 (Eastern (EST))
  - Summer (DST): UTC-4 (EDT)
- Area code: 828
- GNIS feature ID: 2584318
- FIPS code: 37-25160

Fruitland is an unincorporated community and census-designated place (CDP) in Henderson County, North Carolina, United States. Its population was 2,031 as of the 2010 census.

== History ==
A post office called Fruitland was established in 1883, and remained in operation until 1906. The community was named for apple orchards near the original town site.

== Geography ==
Fruitland is in northeastern Henderson County, 7 miles (11 km) northeast of Hendersonville, the county seat. U.S. Route 64 runs along the southern edge of the CDP, leading west to Hendersonville and northeast 8 miles (13 km) to Bat Cave. Asheville is 19 miles (31 km) to the northwest via Terrys Gap Road.

According to the U.S. Census Bureau, the Fruitland CDP has a total area of 8.1 square miles (20.9 km^{2}), of which 0.03 square miles (0.07 km^{2}), or 0.35%, are water.

== Demographics ==
Historical population
Census	Pop.	Note	%±
2020	2,257		—
U.S. Decennial Census
