= Michael Sherrill =

American sculptor

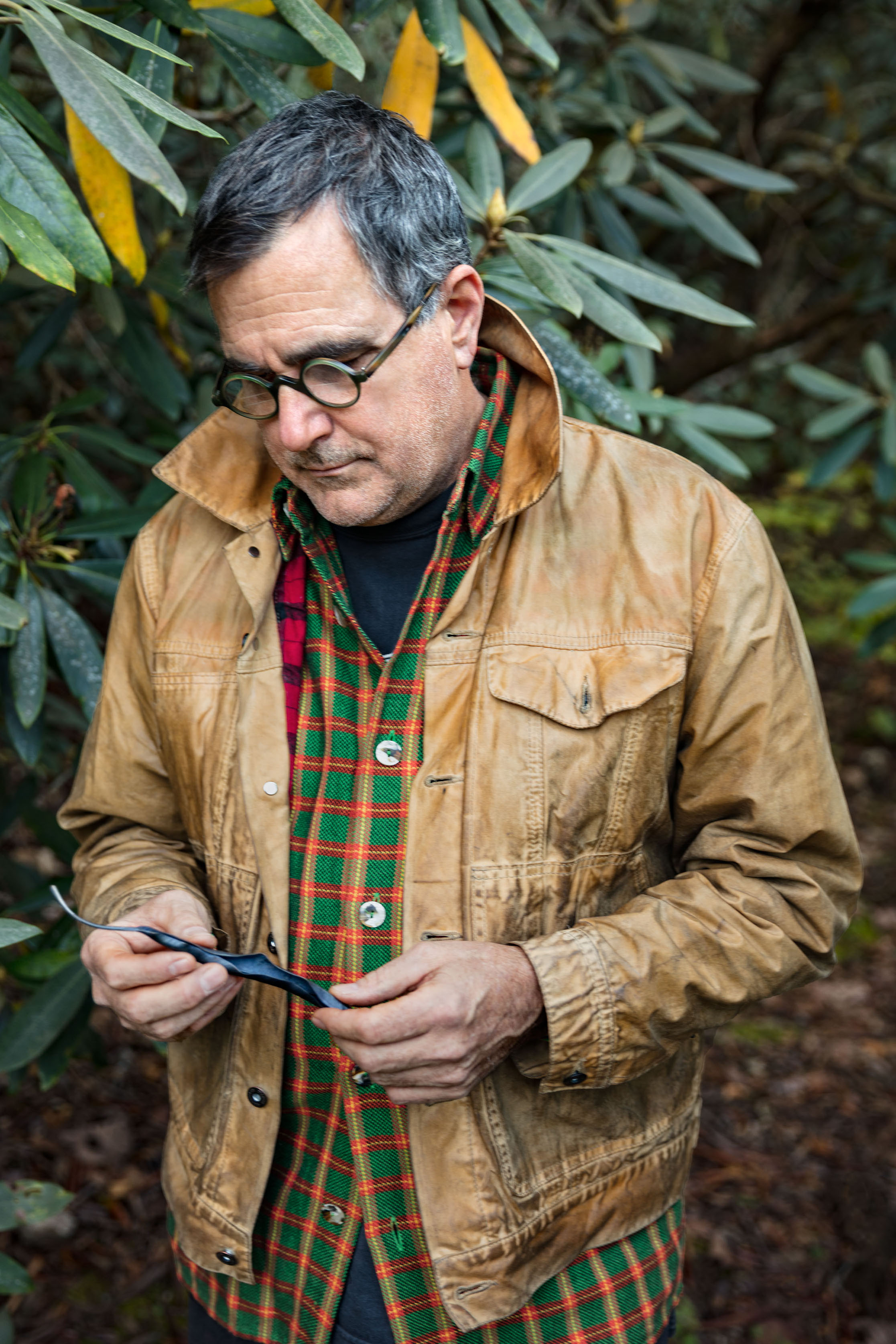
- Born: September 27, 1954 (age 71); Providence, Rhode Island
- Known for: Ceramic art, sculpture
- Awards: 2010 United States Artists Wingate Fellow

Michael Sherrill (born October 27, 1954) is an American ceramist and sculptor. Primarily self-taught, Sherrill's early work in the 1970s and 1980s focused on creating functional pieces in clay before turning to sculptural artwork in porcelain and metal in the 1990s. Sherrill lives and works in Bat Cave, North Carolina.

== Early life and education ==
Born in Providence, Rhode Island to Betty Church Byrum and James William Sherrill, a machinist and self-taught inventor. Sherrill was raised in Charlotte, North Carolina, where his family moved when Sherrill was three years old. A diagnosis of dyslexia when Sherrill was a boy affirmed in him a natural desire to learn through using his hands, often by taking apart objects to see how they functioned. While growing up, Sherrill had access to his father's workshop, enabling him, from a young age, to gain familiarity with the form and function of tools and heavy equipment.

At sixteen years of age, a summer spent with his grandfather in Gastonia, North Carolina, proved to be an influential period for Sherrill. He spent his months there working with textile machinery at a local mill, where he gained an appreciation for the beauty of functional objects; he developed a particular fascination for objects touched regularly by human hands. Sherrill credits his grandfather for helping him to gain an appreciation for humble objects, such as oxen yokes and leather harnesses, as well as for the natural world.

In 1974, after spending a year at community college, Sherrill relocated from Charlotte to the mountains of western North Carolina, where he started producing functional salt-glazed pottery. Sherrill lives and maintains a 5,000 square foot working studio in Bat Cave, located in Henderson County.

== Work ==
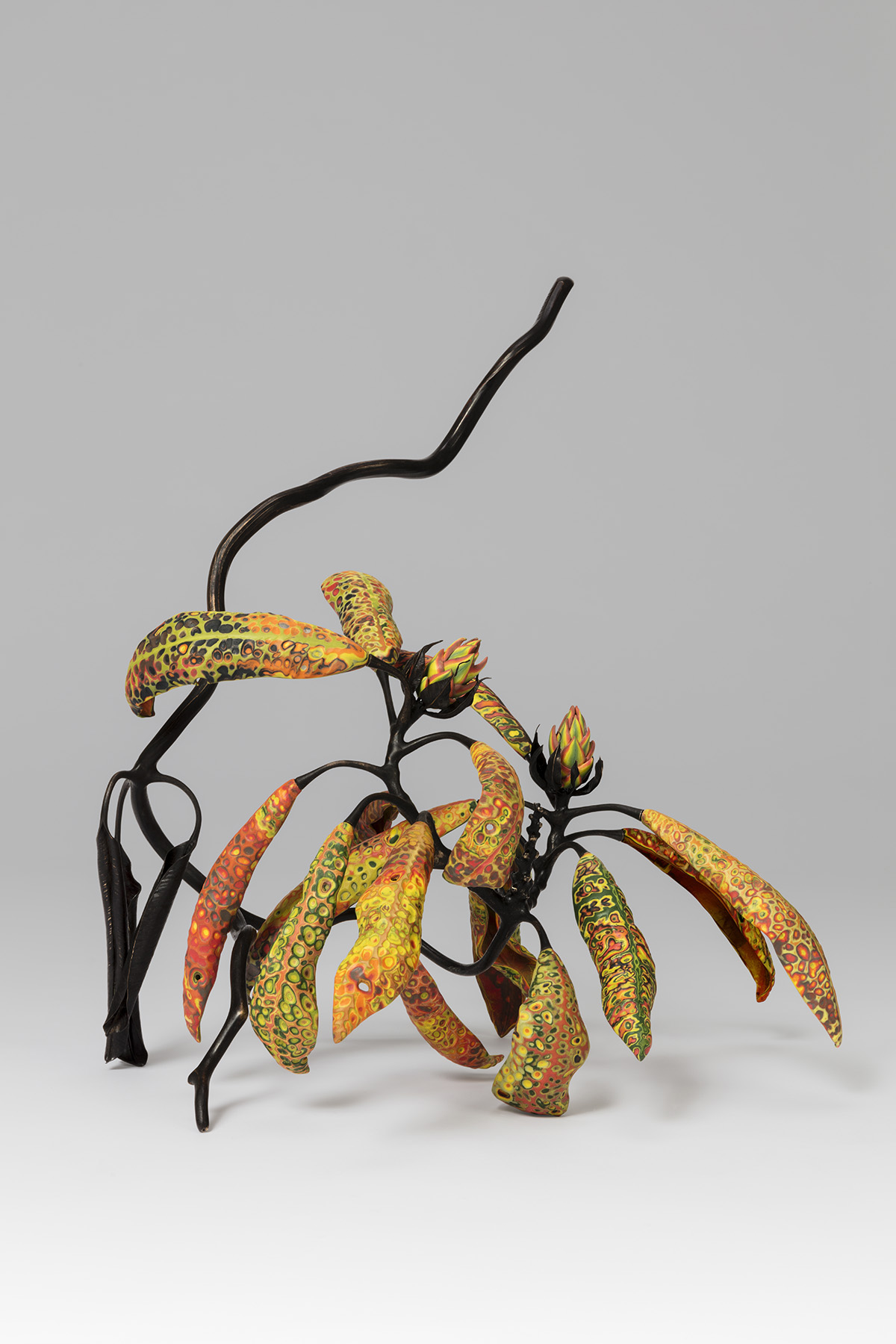
Mashiko by Michael Sherrill, 2018. Porcelain and silica bronze. 16x16x11"

Since 1974, Sherrill has created work in clay, including multimedia sculptures incorporating porcelain, metal, and glass. Sherrill was influenced in his early work by the North Carolina folk pottery tradition as well as by artists at Penland School of Crafts. Over the course of his career, Sherrill has experimented widely with various techniques and materials in the clay medium, notably in the wide range of styles of teapots that he produced over twenty years, from the late 1970s to the late 1990s.

In the early 1990s, Sherrill started creating pieces in clay using an extruder, a tool that pushes clay through a die to form hollow tubes that can be shaped into any form. By the late 1990s he was using the extruder for most of the artwork he produced. Sherrill also started introducing color into porcelain clay and began experimenting with botanical forms that either arose in his imagination or from actual plants witnessed on daily on walks surrounding his studio. Sherrill personally creates the dies for the extruders that are used in his studio production. Many of his artworks from the past two decades incorporate metal and glass elements with the extruded clay, which is often layered and abraded to create a desired look, as well as kiln-fired up to four times.

A traveling retrospective show of Sherrill's work launched in early 2019 at the Mint Museum before traveling to the Renwick Gallery and Arizona State University Art Museum.

== Collections ==
- Renwick Gallery of the Smithsonian American Art Museum
- Los Angeles County Museum of Art
- Mint Museum, Charlotte, North Carolina
- Corning Museum of Glass
- Racine Art Museum, Racine, Wisconsin
- Museum of Glass in Tacoma, Washington
- International Ceramic Museum in Inchon, S. Korea
- William J. Clinton Presidential Library

== Recognition ==
In 2003, the Mint Museum of Craft + Design designated Sherrill as Artist of the Year. Sherrill was the 2010 United States Artists Wingate Fellow. In 2019, the James Renwick Alliance named Sherrill a Master of the Medium (Ceramic).
