= Bearwallow, North Carolina =

- Unincorporated community
- Location within North Carolina Location within the United States
- Coordinates: 35°27′47″N 82°18′58″W
- Country: United States
- State: North Carolina
- County: Henderson
- Named for: A bear wallow
- Elevation: 2,031 ft (619 m)
- Time zone: UTC-5 (Eastern (EST))
  - Summer (DST): UTC-4 (EDT)
- ZIP codes: 28735 and 28792
- Area code: 828
- GNIS feature ID: 1006125

Bearwallow is an unincorporated community in Henderson County, North Carolina United States and is part of the Asheville Metropolitan Statistical Area. It is located along Gerton Highway (US 74A), within Hickory Nut Gorge, flanked by Burntshirt, Grant, and Little Bearwallow mountains.

== History ==
The area was first connected by a Drovers' road, a natural access into the interior of the Blue Ridge Mountains for drovers who were moving livestock, mostly flocks of turkeys and some geese, herds of hogs and some cattle in and out of the mountains to the markets. Established in 1798, it connected the area with Asheville, following on what is today US 74A. It was also during the 1790s when William Mills, a pioneer settler, named the area after a much-frequented bear wallow located there.

The "Bear Wallow" post office was established in 1858; it was the first post office in the area, followed by Bat Cave (1879) and Pump (1883). In 1894, the space between the names was removed, becoming Bearwallow. In 1951, the post office was closed and combined with the Gerton Post Office.
