= Barker Heights, North Carolina =

- Census-designated place
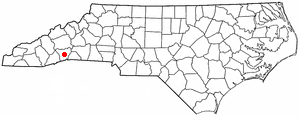
- Location of Barker Heights, North Carolina
- Coordinates: 35°18′38″N 82°26′28″W
- Country: United States
- State: North Carolina
- County: Henderson

Area
  - Total: 1.00 sq mi (2.58 km^{2})
  - Land: 0.99 sq mi (2.57 km^{2})
  - Water: 0 sq mi (0.00 km^{2})
- Elevation: 2,136 ft (651 m)

Population (2020)
  - Total: 1,249
  - Density: 1,257.4/sq mi (485.49/km^{2})
- Time zone: UTC-5 (Eastern (EST))
  - Summer (DST): UTC-4 (EDT)
- ZIP code: 28792
- Area code: 828
- FIPS code: 37-03640
- GNIS feature ID: 2402663

Barker Heights is an unincorporated area and census-designated place (CDP) in Henderson County, North Carolina, United States. As of the 2020 census, Barker Heights had a population of 1,249. It is part of the Asheville Metropolitan Statistical Area.

== Geography ==
Barker Heights is located in central Henderson County. It is bordered to the north, west, and south by Hendersonville, the county seat, and to the southeast by East Flat Rock. Hendersonville Airport is in the eastern part of the CDP.

According to the United States Census Bureau, the CDP has a total area of 1.0 square mile (2.6 km^{2}), of which 0.858 acres (3,474 m^{2}), or 0.13%, are water.

== Demographics ==
Historical population
Census	Pop.	Note	%±
2020	1,249		—
U.S. Decennial Census

As of the census of 2000, there were 1,237 people, 482 households, and 348 families residing in the CDP. The population density was 1,176.8 inhabitants per square mile (454.4/km^{2}). There were 533 housing units at an average density of 507.1 per square mile (195.8/km^{2}). The racial makeup of the CDP was 77.12% White, 4.85% African American, 0.97% Native American, 1.46% Asian, 0.08% Pacific Islander, 13.10% from other races, and 2.43% from two or more races. Hispanic or Latino of any race were 21.34% of the population.

There were 482 households, out of which 35.1% had children under the age of 18 living with them, 49.8% were married couples living together, 16.2% had a female householder with no husband present, and 27.8% were non-families. 24.7% of all households were made up of individuals, and 10.4% had someone living alone who was 65 years of age or older. The average household size was 2.57 and the average family size was 3.00.

In the CDP, the population was spread out, with 27.9% under the age of 18, 10.3% from 18 to 24, 31.0% from 25 to 44, 19.6% from 45 to 64, and 11.2% who were 65 years of age or older. The median age was 33 years. For every 100 females, there were 105.5 males. For every 100 females age 18 and over, there were 103.7 males.

The median income for a household in the CDP was $26,726, and the median income for a family was $32,143. Males had a median income of $26,573 versus $20,288 for females. The per capita income for the CDP was $13,307. About 11.4% of families and 13.4% of the population were below the poverty line, including 14.2% of those under age 18 and 19.7% of those age 65 or over.
