= Teva Lea Race =

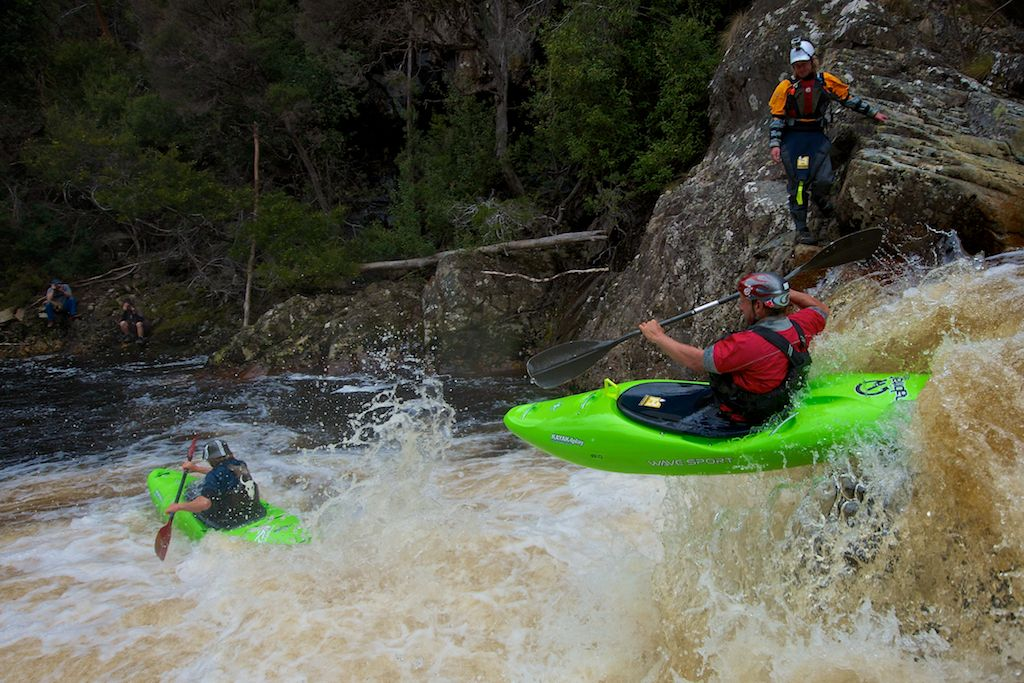
Dan Hall and Rob Parker boofing First Drop, on their way to winning the 10th anniversary race

Teva Lea Race is Australia's longest-running extreme race.

== History ==
The first Lea Extreme Race was held in 2003 on short section on the Lea River. The inaugural race and subsequent 10 races were organized by the Derwent Canoe Club and Hobart paddling identity Leigh Weighton. The race has developed a strong local following as a grass roots and with international competition, creating an elite field

The Lea Race, as it is colloquially known, celebrated its 10th anniversary on 6 October 2012

The race course runs through many rapids, with the three largest drops being "First Drop", a clean 2 m waterfall, "Screaming Plastic Surgeons" having a total drop of 8 m, with the last drop being a 4 m waterfall and "Proctologist's Twist" being a slide followed by a 4 m drop into a slot

== Format ==
The race is undertaken in teams of two, with competitors providing safety for their teammate, on several of the larger drops additional safety personnel are placed. The pair must complete the course at the same time, and the race time is determined from when the second paddler crosses the finish line.

On the following day a ball race is normally conducted on the course, which involves the team of two successfully pushing or guiding an inflatable fit ball down the river.

== Background ==
The Derwent Canoe Clubs' Lea Extreme Race is Australia longest-running extreme race The first race was run in 2003, and has been held each year since. The 2012 race was remarkable due to only having moderate water levels; however, in previous years the event has been run with higher water levels, with only the best paddlers being able complete the course successfully.

== See also ==
- 2008 4th Annual Race Commentary
- Freeboating
- Creeking
- Whitewater Kayaking
