= Tuxedo, North Carolina =

- Unincorporated community
- Location within North Carolina Location within the United States
- Coordinates: 35°13′31″N 82°25′46″W
- Country: United States
- State: North Carolina
- County: Henderson County
- Elevation: 2,054.000 ft (626.0592 m)
- Time zone: UTC-5 (Eastern Standard Time)
  - Summer (DST): Eastern Daylight Time
- ZIP code: 28784
- Area code: 828
- GNIS feature ID: 996378

Tuxedo is an unincorporated community in southern Henderson County, North Carolina, United States, which was originally called Lakewood.

== Etymology ==
Early in the 20th century, the newly formed village of Lakewood, North Carolina, changed its name to Tuxedo (after a town in NY State) to avoid confusion with a similarly named town in North Carolina. Tuxedo is claimed to be a corruption of an Indian phrase of unknown origin, p'tauk suttough, supposedly meaning "place of the bears." The name of Tuxedo, New York, however, originally derives from the Lenape word ptukwsiit (Munsee dialect) or tùkwsit (Unami dialect), meaning "round foot" or Wolf Clan.

== History ==
A large mill, the Green River Manufacturing plant, employed some 250 area workers after its completion in 1910. That same year, the post office was renamed Tuxedo (after having used Lakewood name since its 1908 establishment), and remained in operation until 1993. The mill, at the time called WestPoint Pepperell–Tuxedo, closed for good in 1990.

Camp Arrowhead, located in Tuxedo, was listed on the National Register of Historic Places in 2005. Tuxedo is also home to camps Mondamin, Green Cove, Talisman, Greystone and Falling Creek Camp.

== Location ==
Tuxedo is located on U.S. Route 25 and U.S. Route 176, approximately 9 miles (14 km) north of the South Carolina border, at 2,054 feet (626 m) above sea level. It is home to North Carolina's Green River Nature Preserve.

Nearby Lake Summit was formed in 1920 by an impoundment of the Green River when additional power was needed for area businesses in the past.
