= Hungry River =

Stream in North Carolina, US

Hungry River Tributary to Green River
- Location of Green River mouth

Location
- Country: United States
- State: North Carolina
- County: Henderson

Physical characteristics
- Source: divide between Hungry River and Broad River
  - location: Ottanola Gap
  - coordinates: 35°23′28″N 082°15′54″W
  - elevation: 2,940 ft (900 m)
- Mouth: Green River
  - location: about 2 miles southeast of Upland, North Carolina
  - coordinates: 35°16′59″N 082°21′30″W
  - elevation: 1,560 ft (480 m)
- Length: 12.2 mi (19.6 km)
- Basin size: 21.4 square miles (55 km^{2})
- Discharge
  - location: Green River
  - average: 51.79 cu ft/s (1.467 m^{3}/s) at mouth with Green River

Basin features
- Progression: southwest
- River system: Broad River
- Tributaries
  - left: unnamed tributaries
  - right: Little Hungry River; Tumblebug Creek

The Hungry River flows in western North Carolina, United States. It arises in eastern Henderson County and flows southwesterly, its entire course within Henderson County, before it empties into the Green River. In 1904, the first hydroelectric plant in Henderson County was built on the river, and, in 1913, a second dam was built half a mile downstream for the same purpose. Only one stands to this day, though it is currently inoperable, damaged and slated for removal under management of the North Carolina Wildlife Resources Commission.
