= Bear Wallow, Morgan County, Kentucky =

Unincorporated community in Kentucky, United States

Bear Wallow, Kentucky
- Unincorporated community
- Location within Kentucky Location within the United States
- Coordinates: 37°54′34″N 83°19′8″W
- Country: United States
- State: Kentucky
- County: Morgan
- Elevation: 863 ft (263 m)
- Time zone: UTC-5 (Eastern (EST))
  - Summer (DST): UTC-4 (EST)
- GNIS feature ID: 2362570

Bear Wallow is an unincorporated community and coal town in Morgan County, Kentucky, United States.
