= Lea River =

River in Tasmania, Australia

River Lea
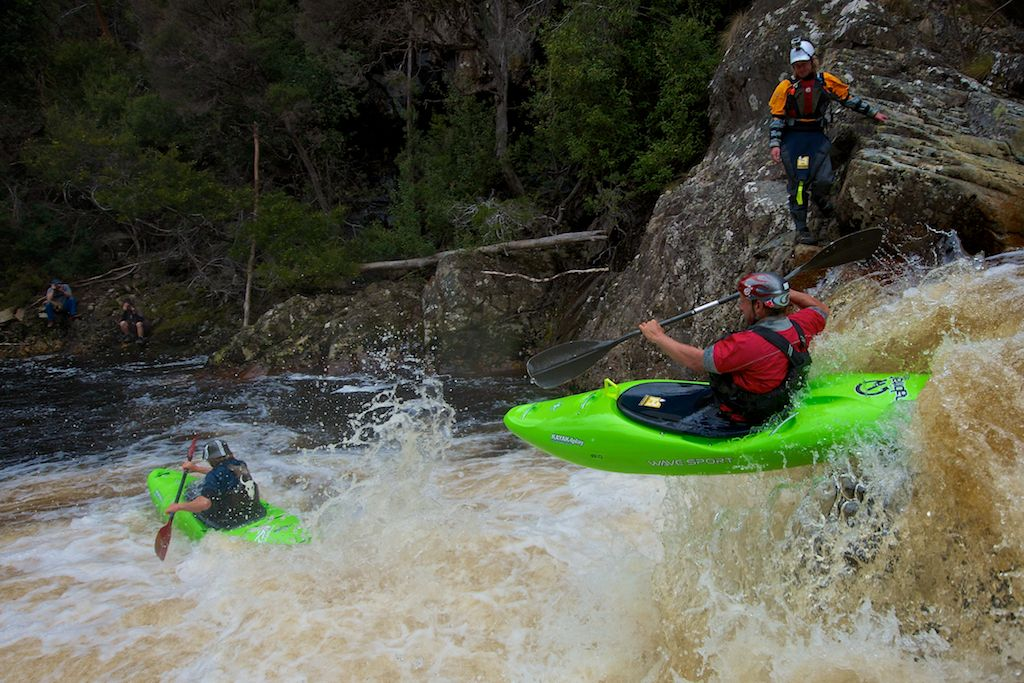
- Dan Hall and Rob Parker boofing First Drop, on their way to winning the 10th anniversary race on the Lea River.

- Location of the River Lea mouth in Tasmania
- Etymology: River Lea

Location
- Country: Australia
- State: Tasmania
- Region: North-western Tasmania

Physical characteristics
- Source
  - location: Lake Lea
  - coordinates: 41°30′56″S 145°56′09″E
  - elevation: 818 m (2,684 ft)
- Mouth: Lake Gairdner
  - coordinates: 41°28′17″S 146°03′55″E
  - elevation: 472 m (1,549 ft)

The River Lea is a steep continuous river in the north-western region of Tasmania, Australia.

The river has an average gradient of 27 metres per kilometre (140 ft/mi) and a peak grade of 45 metres per kilometre (240 ft/mi) that flows from Lake Lea to Lake Gairdner.

The river flows during the Tasmanian winter and spring, with flow reducing over the drier summer months.

Located in a remote wilderness area, the Lea River is the site of the annual Lea Extreme Race.

== Named places on the Lea River ==
First Drop	41°28′25″S 146°02′56″E
Dog Leg	
Screaming Plastic Surgeons	
Proctologists' Twist	

== See also ==
- List of rivers of Australia § Tasmania
