= Henderson County, North Carolina =

County in North Carolina, United States

- County
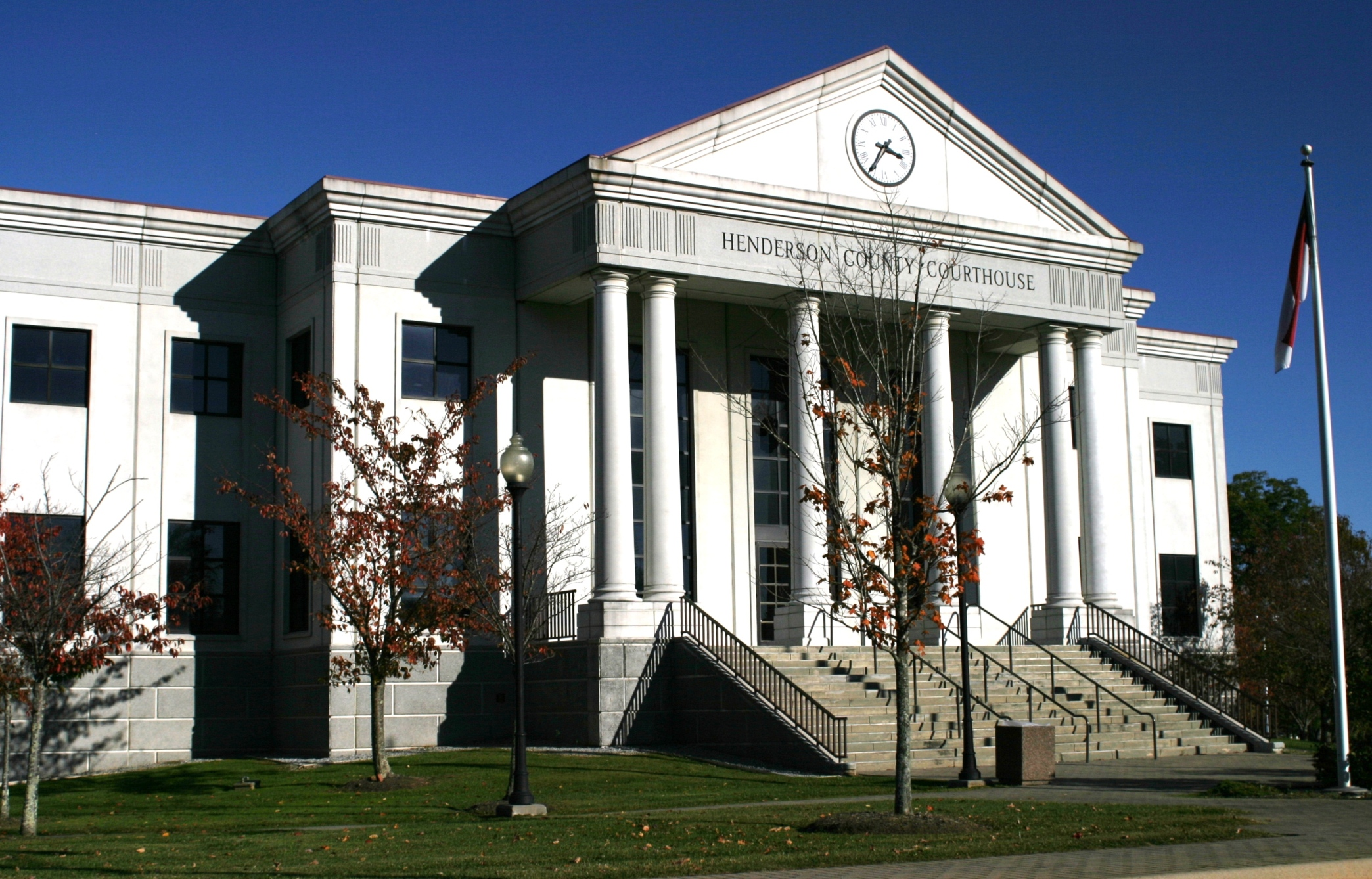
- Henderson County Courthouse

- Flag Seal Logo

- Location within the U.S. state of North Carolina
- Interactive map of Henderson County, North Carolina
- Coordinates: 35.34°N 82.48°W
- Country: United States
- State: North Carolina
- Founded: 1838
- Named for: Leonard Henderson
- Seat: Hendersonville
- Largest community: Hendersonville

Area
  - Total: 375.09 sq mi (971.5 km^{2})
  - Land: 372.95 sq mi (965.9 km^{2})
  - Water: 2.14 sq mi (5.5 km^{2}) 0.57%

Population (2020)
  - Total: 116,281
  - Estimate (2025): 122,375 ▲
  - Density: 311.79/sq mi (120.38/km^{2})
- Time zone: UTC−5 (Eastern)
  - Summer (DST): UTC−4 (EDT)
- Congressional district: 11th
- Website: www.hendersoncountync.gov

Henderson County is a county located in the U.S. state of North Carolina. As of the 2020 census, the population was 116,281. Its county seat is Hendersonville. Henderson County is part of the Asheville, NC Metropolitan Statistical Area.

== History ==
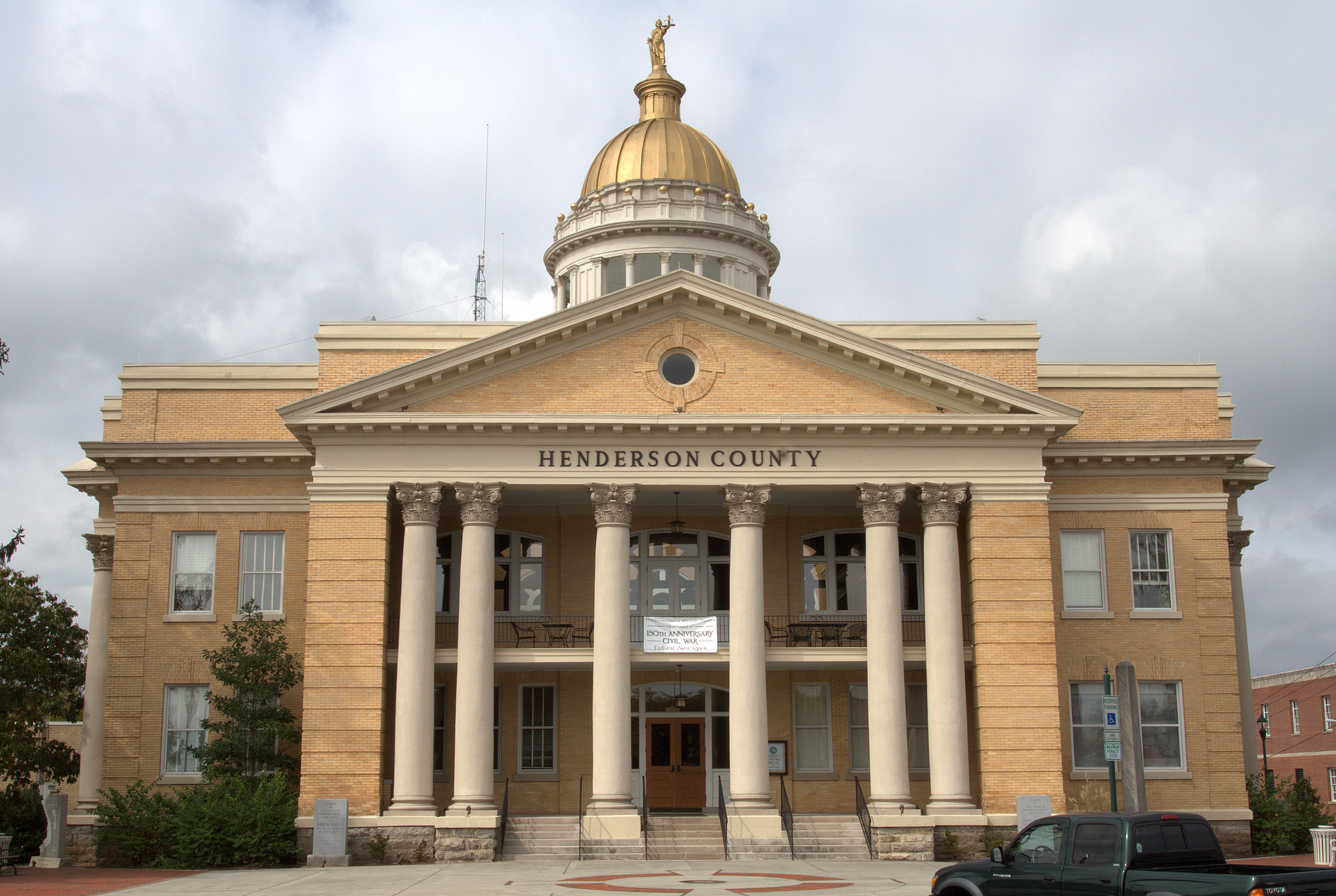
Former Henderson County Courthouse, now used as the Henderson County Heritage Museum

The county was formed in 1838 from the southern part of Buncombe County. It was named for Leonard Henderson, Chief Justice of the North Carolina Supreme Court from 1829 to 1833. There is no evidence Henderson ever passed through the area.

In 1855 parts of Henderson County and Rutherford County were combined to form Polk County, and in 1861 parts of Henderson County and Jackson County were combined to form Transylvania County.

Henderson County, which in 1861 encompassed present-day Transylvania County as well, contributed 1,296 soldiers to the Confederate States Army out of its approximately 10,000 population, as well as 130 Union troops. (Figures from Terrell T. Garren's "Mountain Myth: Unionism in Western North Carolina, published 2006).

Henderson County government was centered around Hendersonville in the 1905 county courthouse on Main Street, until this structure was replaced by the new Courthouse (c. 1995) on Grove Street in Hendersonville.

The first rail line reached Hendersonville in 1879, ushering in a new era of access to the outside world. However, parts of the county had long been known as retreats, including the "Little Charleston" of Flat Rock in which South Carolina's Low Country planter families had maintained second homes since the early 19th century.

A major land boom ensued in the 1920s, culminating in the crash of 1929, which severely deflated prices and left structures such as the Fleetwood Hotel atop Jumpoff Mountain incomplete. Population growth in the county has been rapid since the 1960s as a result of an influx from other states, with many new housing developments changing the face of previously rural areas of the county.

Other notable historic sites in Henderson County include: the Woodfield Inn (1852), Connemara—final home of Carl Sandburg (originally known as Rock Hill, the home of CSA Secretary of the Treasury Christopher Memminger) – and the St. John in the Wilderness Episcopal Church. Today, Flat Rock is the site of the main campus of Blue Ridge Community College and is home to the Flat Rock Playhouse, the state theatre of North Carolina.

== Geography ==
Henderson County Elevation

Henderson County is located in the Blue Ridge Mountains of southwestern North Carolina, on the border with South Carolina. The Eastern Continental Divide, which lies along the crest of the Blue Ridge, passes through the county. The northwestern slope of the Divide is known as the Blue Ridge Plateau and the southeastern slope as the Blue Ridge Escarpment. These two physiographic features have unique characteristics that account for wide variations in the county's climate. According to the U.S. Census Bureau, the county has a total area of 375 square miles (970 km^{2}), of which 373 square miles (970 km^{2}) is land and 2.2 square miles (5.7 km^{2}) (0.6%) is water. The county's largest body of water is Lake Summit, a reservoir impounded by the Duke Power Company for hydroelectric generation. The county's major streams are the French Broad River (whose conjunction with the Holston River forms the Tennessee River, flowing into the Ohio River, the Mississippi River, and eventually the Gulf of Mexico), Mills River, Green River, Little River, Mud Creek, Clear Creek, Cane Creek, Hungry River, and the headwaters of the Broad River (which flows into the Congaree River of South Carolina and eventually into the Atlantic Ocean). The lowest point in the county is found along the Broad River at approximately 1,394 feet at the boundary between Henderson and Rutherford Counties in North Carolina. The high point is located on Little Pisgah Mountain at approximately 5,278 feet along the Henderson-Haywood County boundary in North Carolina (Note that a second Little Pisgah Mountain at 4,412 feet is located at the boundary between Henderson and Buncombe counties in North Carolina). According to the U.S. Census Bureau, the county has a total area of 375.09 square miles (971.5 km^{2}), of which 372.95 square miles (965.9 km^{2}) is land and 2.14 square miles (5.5 km^{2}) (0.57%) is water.

=== Landscape and climate ===
Due to its geographic setting along the Eastern Continental Divide and its extreme topographic variation, Henderson County presents a wide variation in temperature and precipitation conditions. The highest elevations occur along the northwest and northern boundaries of the county and within the Blue Ridge Escarpment, a rugged area of peaks and narrow valleys that rise from the Piedmont to the continental divide and the Blue Ridge Plateau. The lowest elevations occur within the valleys of the escarpment and in the broader valleys of the Blue Ridge Plateau. The mean annual temperature of the county is 55.1 °F (12.8 °C), with a range from 50.3 to 57.9 °F (10.2 to 14.4 °C) depending on the elevation, with higher temperatures occurring at lower elevations and lower temperatures in the higher mountains. The month of July is the hottest in the county, with a mean temperature of 72.6 °F (22.6 °C) and a mean range of 66.6 to 75.8 °F (19.2 to 24.3 °C). The coolest month is January with a mean temperature of 36.9 °F (2.7 °C) and a mean range of 33.3 to 39.5 °F (0.7 to 4.2 °C). Precipitation is also correlated to elevation, with higher precipitation normally occurring at higher elevations and lower precipitation in the valleys. The mean annual precipitation of Henderson County is 56.2 inches (1,430 mm), with a mean range of 45.04 to 78.03 inches (1,144 to 1,982 mm). March has the highest mean precipitation of 5.1 inches (130 mm), with a mean range of 3.9 to 6.7 inches (99 to 170 mm). The lowest precipitation occurs in October, with a mean value of 3.9 inches (99 mm) and a mean range of 2.8 to 5.8 inches (71 to 147 mm).

=== Agriculture ===
Henderson County's topographic and climatic diversity make it ideal for a great variety of commercial crops and agricultural products. Parts of the county between the Pisgah National Forest on the northwest and the boundary with Polk County on the southeast are often referred to locally as the Crest of the Blue Ridge Agricultural Area in recognition of the region's unique growing conditions. At the present time the fruit and berry types being raised include apples, blackberries, blueberries, cantaloupes, cherries, grapes, peaches, plums, raspberries, strawberries and watermelons.

A special word should be said for Henderson County's apple production. Since World War II, apples have been the most important agricultural crop in the county; they require extensive winter chilling, and do not tolerate summer heat and humidity well, so Henderson County, with its cooler climate due to its elevation represents an ideal environment for orchards. Henderson County represents, in fact, the southern limit for large-scale commercial apple production in the eastern United States. The tradition of honoring the local apple industry persists in the county's annual North Carolina Apple Festival, held each year around Labor Day, and culminating in the "King Apple Parade" attended by tens of thousands of spectators. In addition to fruits and berries, a number of commercial vegetable crops are raised in Henderson County, including asparagus, green beans, beets, broccoli, cabbage, cauliflower, carrots, corn, cucumbers, egg plants, greens, herbs, lettuce, mushrooms, okra, onions, peas, peppers (bell and hot), potatoes, pumpkins, radishes, spinach, squash (winter and summer varieties), tomatoes, turnips, and zucchini. Meat, eggs, and dairy products are also important, with beef, fish, goat meat, mountain trout, pork, poultry, sweet and hard cider, wine and cheese being produced in commercial quantities.

=== National protected areas ===
- Blue Ridge Parkway (part)
- Carl Sandburg Home National Historic Site
- Pisgah National Forest (part)

=== State and local protected areas ===
- Chimney Rock State Park (part)
- Dupont State Forest Game Land (part)
- DuPont State Recreational Forest (part)
- Florence Nature Preserve
- Green River Game Lands (part)
- Holmes Educational State Forest (part)
- Pisgah National Forest Game Land (part)

=== Major water bodies ===
- Broad River
- French Broad River
- Green River
- Hungry River
- Lake Summit
- Little Hungry River
- North Pacolet River
- South Fork Hoopers Creek
- South Fork Mills River

=== Adjacent counties ===
- Buncombe County – north
- Rutherford County – northeast
- Polk County – east
- Greenville County, South Carolina – south
- Transylvania County – west
- Haywood County – northwest

=== Major highways ===
- I-26
- US 25
- US 64
- US 64 Truck
- US 74
- US 74A
- US 176
- NC 9
- NC 191
- NC 225
- NC 280
- Blue Ridge Parkway

== Demographics ==
Historical population
Census	Pop.	Note	%±
1840	5,129		—
1850	6,853		33.6%
1860	10,448		52.5%
1870	7,706		−26.2%
1880	10,281		33.4%
1890	12,589		22.4%
1900	14,104		12.0%
1910	16,262		15.3%
1920	18,248		12.2%
1930	23,404		28.3%
1940	26,049		11.3%
1950	30,921		18.7%
1960	36,163		17.0%
1970	42,804		18.4%
1980	58,580		36.9%
1990	69,285		18.3%
2000	89,173		28.7%
2010	106,740		19.7%
2020	116,281		8.9%
2025 (est.)	122,375	▲	5.2%
U.S. Decennial Census; 1790–1960 1900–1990; 1990–2000 2010 2020

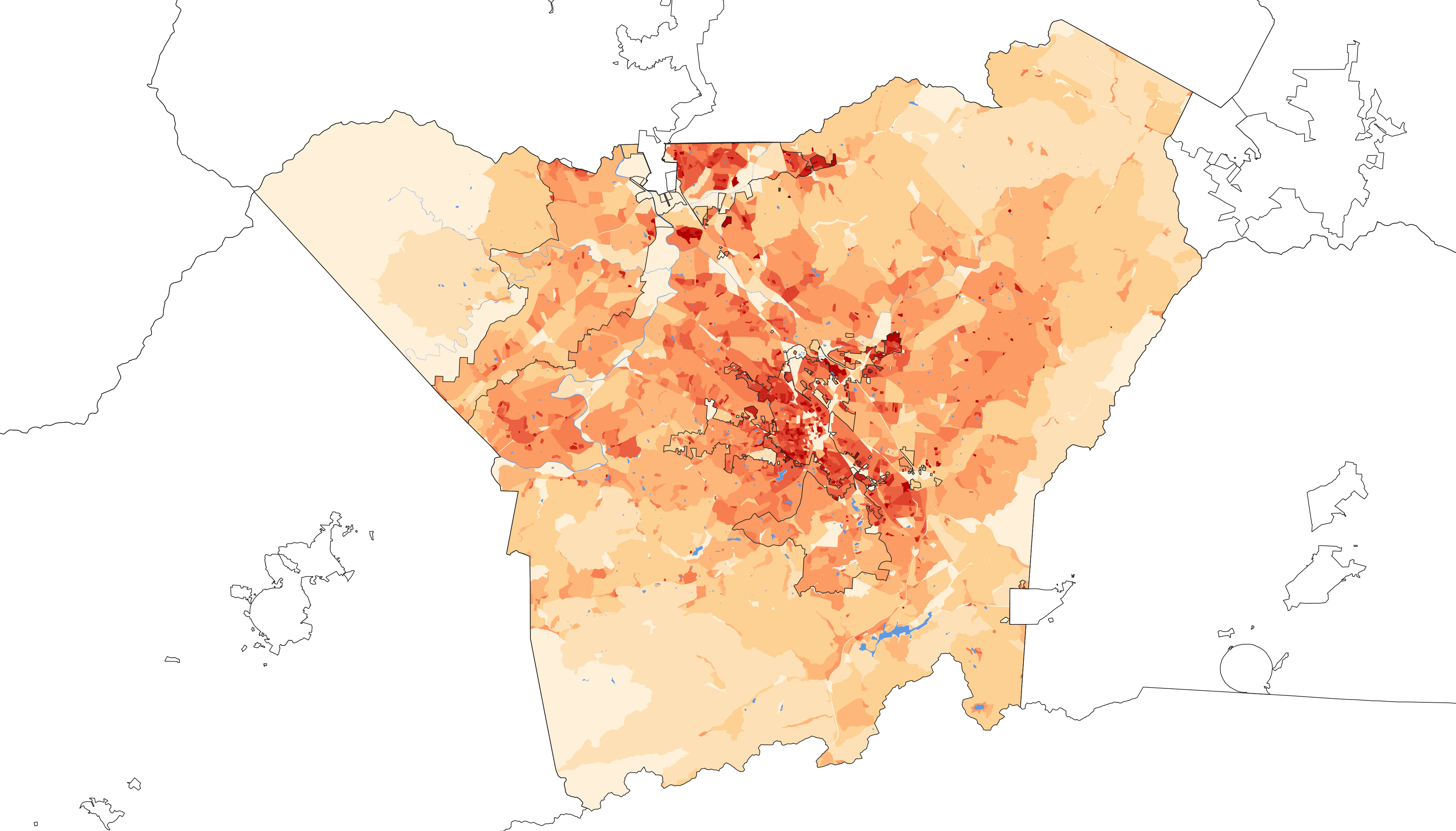
2020 population density of Henderson County NC by census block

=== Racial and ethnic composition ===
Henderson County, North Carolina – Racial and ethnic composition Note: the US Census treats Hispanic/Latino as an ethnic category. This table excludes Latinos from the racial categories and assigns them to a separate category. Hispanics/Latinos may be of any race.
Race / Ethnicity (NH = Non-Hispanic)	Pop 1980	Pop 1990	Pop 2000	Pop 2010	Pop 2020	% 1980	% 1990	% 2000	% 2010	% 2020
White alone (NH)	55,947	65,606	80,118	90,105	91,747	95.51%	94.69%	89.85%	84.42%	78.90%
Black or African American alone (NH)	2,107	2,348	2,686	3,149	3,299	3.60%	3.39%	3.01%	2.95%	2.84%
Native American or Alaska Native alone (NH)	71	192	188	318	284	0.12%	0.28%	0.21%	0.30%	0.24%
Asian alone (NH)	72	278	543	994	1,296	0.12%	0.40%	0.61%	0.93%	1.11%
Native Hawaiian or Pacific Islander alone (NH)	x	x	15	165	241	x	x	0.02%	0.15%	0.21%
Other race alone (NH)	39	15	47	105	400	0.07%	0.02%	0.05%	0.10%	0.34%
Mixed race or Multiracial (NH)	x	x	696	1,480	4,015	x	x	0.78%	1.39%	3.45%
Hispanic or Latino (any race)	344	846	4,880	10,424	14,999	0.59%	1.22%	5.47%	9.77%	12.90%
Total	58,580	69,285	89,173	106,740	116,281	100.00%	100.00%	100.00%	100.00%	100.00%

=== 2020 census ===
As of the 2020 census, there were 116,281 people and 33,992 families residing in the county. The median age was 48.0 years. 18.8% of residents were under the age of 18 and 26.9% of residents were 65 years of age or older. For every 100 females there were 91.8 males, and for every 100 females age 18 and over there were 89.2 males age 18 and over.

The racial makeup of the county was 81.0% White, 2.9% Black or African American, 0.5% American Indian and Alaska Native, 1.2% Asian, 0.5% Native Hawaiian and Pacific Islander, 7.2% from some other race, and 6.7% from two or more races. Hispanic or Latino residents of any race comprised 12.9% of the population.

65.7% of residents lived in urban areas, while 34.3% lived in rural areas.

There were 49,317 households in the county, of which 24.2% had children under the age of 18 living in them. Of all households, 51.4% were married-couple households, 15.7% were households with a male householder and no spouse or partner present, and 27.2% were households with a female householder and no spouse or partner present. About 28.8% of all households were made up of individuals and 15.7% had someone living alone who was 65 years of age or older.

There were 56,434 housing units, of which 12.6% were vacant. Among occupied housing units, 74.2% were owner-occupied and 25.8% were renter-occupied. The homeowner vacancy rate was 1.6% and the rental vacancy rate was 7.7%.

=== 2010 census ===
At the 2010 census, there were 106,740 people, 45,180 households, and 28,613 families residing in the county. The population density was 275.83 people per square mile (106.50 people/km^{2}). There were 42,996 housing units at an average density of 115 units per square mile (44 units/km^{2}). The racial makeup of the county was 94.5% White, 3.3% Black or African American, 0.4% Native American, 0.8% Asian, and .9% from two or more races. 8.7% of the population were Hispanic or Latino of any race. The county has seen a marked increase in its Hispanic population segment and Hispanic culture in recent decades, and has also shared in the higher immigration from the countries of the former USSR experienced by neighboring Buncombe County.

There were 42,205 households, out of which 25.6% had children under the age of 18 living in them, 54.1% were married couples living together, 9.9% had a female householder with no husband present, and 32.2% were non-families. 28.3% of all households were made up of individuals, and 22% had someone living alone who was 65 years of age or older. The average household size was 2.33 persons and the average family size was 2.78 persons.

In the county, the population was spread out, with 20.80% under the age of 18, 6.30% from 18 to 24, 25.9% from 25 to 44, 26.7% from 45 to 64, and 22.5% who were 65 years of age or older. The median age was 46 years. For every 100 females there were 93.80 males. For every 100 females age 18 and over, there were 90.50 males. Henderson County is characterized by an exceptionally large retiree population.

The median income for a household in the county was $43,013 and the median income for a family was $44,974. Males had a median income of $31,845 versus $23,978 for females. The per capita income for the county was $33,500. About 6.80% of families and 12.9% of the population were below the poverty line, including 14.50% of those under age 18 and 8.30% of those age 65 or over.

Henderson County was historically part of the Cherokee Nation before their removal in the Trail of Tears in 1837–38.

=== Ancestry ===
As of 2015, the largest self-reported ancestry groups in Henderson County were:

Ancestry	Percent (2015)
English (England)	15.4%
American (United States)	13.9%
German (Germany)	13.4%
Irish (Republic of Ireland)	12.2%
Scotch-Irish (Ulster)	4.7%
Scottish (Scotland)	4.0%
Italian (Italy)	3.5%
French (except Basque) (France)	2.1%
Polish (Poland)	1.8%
Dutch (Netherlands)	1.5%

=== Religion ===
As of 2018, the largest religious groups in Henderson County were:

Religion	Percent (2018)
Unaffiliated	44%
Baptist	23%
Other	15%
Methodist	13.4%
Catholic	4.0%
Presbyterian	3.0%
Anglican	2.0%
Seventh-day Adventist	2.0%
Lutheran	1.0%
Pentecostal	1.0%

== Law and government ==
Henderson County is a member of the Land-of-Sky Regional Council of governments. It is governed by the five-member Henderson County Board of Commissioners. All commissioners are members of the Republican Party:

1. Rebecca McCall (chairman)
2. J. Michael Edney (vice-chairman)
3. Sheila Franklin
4. William Lapsley
5. Jay Egolf

The County Manager is John Mitchell. The Henderson County Planning Department publishes statistical information about the county every October.

In April 2021, the district attorney for Henderson County, Gregory A. Newman, was removed from office for willful misconduct and perjury, notably in a 2015 child rape case.

== Politics ==
Henderson County is located in North Carolina's 11th congressional district. The present representative for the county is Chuck Edwards, serving since 2023. Both the Henderson County Republican Party and the Henderson County Democratic Party are active, and have their offices in the county seat, Hendersonville.

Henderson County is a massive outlier in North Carolina. Since 1880, it has been carried by a Democrat just five times–Woodrow Wilson in 1912 and Franklin D. Roosevelt in each of his four elections. Since Roosevelt carried the county in 1944, only Lyndon B. Johnson in 1964, Jimmy Carter in 1976, and Kamala Harris in 2024 have managed to win more than 40 percent of the vote. Barack Obama came close to that mark in 2008 as part of the Democratic surge in the area, and Joe Biden came closer still in 2020, winning 39.8%.

United States presidential election results for Henderson County, North Carolina
Year	Republican		Democratic		Third party(ies)	
Year	No.	%	No.	%	No.	%
1880	836	55.36%	674	44.64%	0	0.00%
1884	995	56.21%	775	43.79%	0	0.00%
1888	1,297	58.63%	915	41.37%	0	0.00%
1892	1,197	56.01%	835	39.07%	105	4.91%
1896	1,459	58.52%	1,022	40.99%	12	0.48%
1900	1,482	60.37%	973	39.63%	0	0.00%
1904	1,341	60.19%	887	39.81%	0	0.00%
1908	1,602	63.60%	917	36.40%	0	0.00%
1912	801	35.21%	1,092	48.00%	382	16.79%
1916	1,795	60.62%	1,166	39.38%	0	0.00%
1920	3,337	57.21%	2,496	42.79%	0	0.00%
1924	3,548	53.73%	3,007	45.54%	48	0.73%
1928	5,210	62.33%	3,149	37.67%	0	0.00%
1932	4,172	43.96%	5,255	55.37%	63	0.66%
1936	5,099	47.01%	5,747	52.99%	0	0.00%
1940	3,712	36.94%	6,336	63.06%	0	0.00%
1944	4,613	44.82%	5,679	55.18%	0	0.00%
1948	4,971	51.61%	3,311	34.38%	1,350	14.02%
1952	8,768	69.75%	3,803	30.25%	0	0.00%
1956	9,243	69.78%	4,003	30.22%	0	0.00%
1960	10,835	70.15%	4,611	29.85%	0	0.00%
1964	8,780	59.14%	6,066	40.86%	0	0.00%
1968	9,334	57.45%	3,053	18.79%	3,861	23.76%
1972	12,134	80.17%	2,701	17.85%	300	1.98%
1976	10,830	56.56%	8,155	42.59%	162	0.85%
1980	13,573	61.19%	7,578	34.16%	1,030	4.64%
1984	19,369	72.55%	7,222	27.05%	106	0.40%
1988	19,711	67.68%	9,338	32.06%	76	0.26%
1992	17,010	51.43%	10,747	32.50%	5,315	16.07%
1996	19,182	58.70%	10,626	32.52%	2,868	8.78%
2000	25,688	66.54%	12,562	32.54%	357	0.92%
2004	28,025	64.82%	15,003	34.70%	206	0.48%
2008	30,930	59.93%	20,082	38.91%	602	1.17%
2012	32,994	62.98%	18,642	35.58%	756	1.44%
2016	35,809	61.55%	19,827	34.08%	2,540	4.37%
2020	40,032	58.55%	27,211	39.80%	1,128	1.65%
2024	39,497	56.45%	29,361	41.96%	1,116	1.59%

Political news and civic affairs are covered by the county's daily newspaper, the Times-News of Hendersonville.

== Communities ==
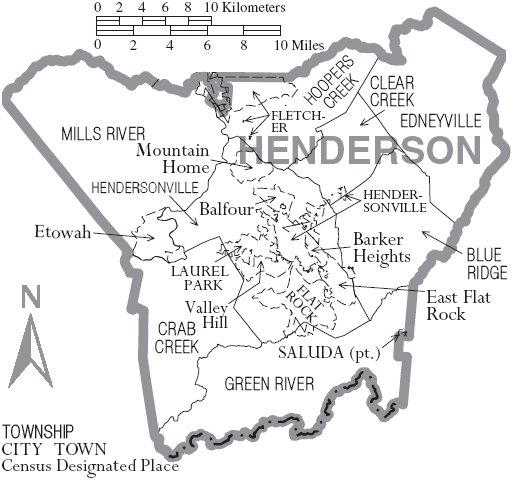
Map of Henderson County with municipal and township labels

=== Cities ===
- Hendersonville (county seat and largest community)
- Saluda

=== Towns ===
- Fletcher
- Laurel Park
- Mills River

=== Village ===
- Flat Rock

=== Census-designated places ===
- Balfour
- Barker Heights
- Dana
- East Flat Rock
- Edneyville
- Etowah
- Fruitland
- Gerton
- Hoopers Creek
- Horse Shoe
- Mountain Home
- Valley Hill

=== Unincorporated communities ===
- Bat Cave
- Bearwallow
- Chestnut Hill
- Mountain Page
- Naples
- Tuxedo
- Zirconia

=== Townships ===
- Blue Ridge
- Clear Creek
- Crab Creek
- Edneyville
- Green River
- Hendersonville
- Hoopers Creek
- Mills River

== Education ==
The school district is Henderson County Schools.

== See also ==
- List of counties in North Carolina
- National Register of Historic Places listings in Henderson County, North Carolina
- Asheville Regional Airport, regional airport directly located north in Buncombe County
