= Bat Cave, North Carolina =

- Unincorporated community
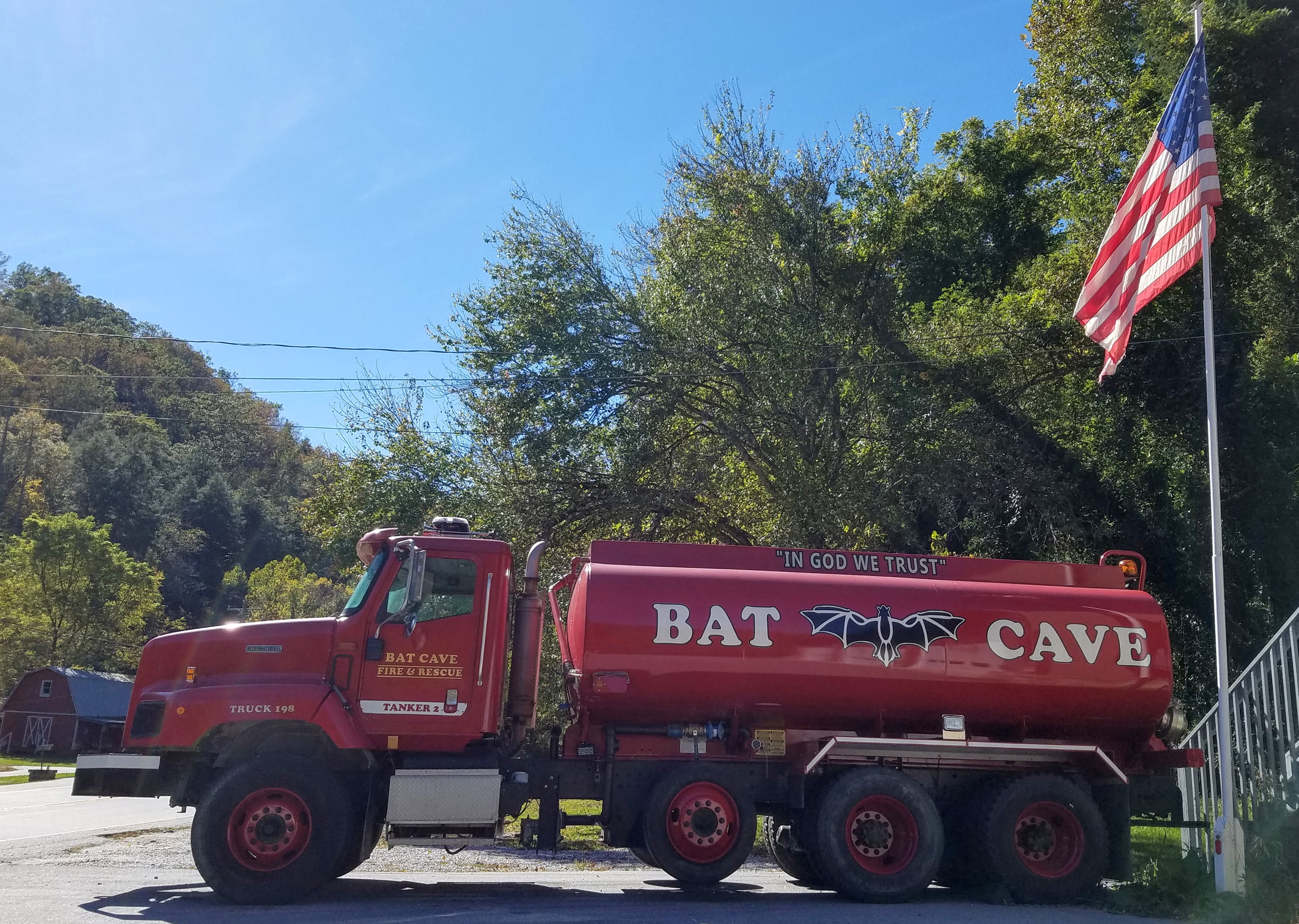
- A fire engine of the Bat Cave fire department

- Location within North Carolina Location within the United States
- Coordinates: 35°27′05″N 82°17′13″W
- Country: United States
- State: North Carolina
- County: Henderson
- Named for: A bat cave located on Bluerock Mountain
- Elevation: 1,480 ft (451 m)
- Time zone: UTC-5 (Eastern (EST))
  - Summer (DST): UTC-4 (EDT)
- ZIP code: 28710
- Area code: 828
- GNIS feature ID: 1018981

Bat Cave is an unincorporated community in Henderson County, North Carolina, United States and is part of the Asheville Metropolitan Statistical Area. Named after a bat cave located on Bluerock Mountain (also known as Bat Cave Mountain), it is the largest known augen gneiss granite fissure cave in North America and is a protected area, not open to the public. It has frequently been noted on lists of unusual place names and is also a regular victim of street sign theft, especially in the early 1990s during the popularity of the movie Batman Returns.

The community, located along the banks of the Broad River and within the Hickory Nut Gorge, features several shops, inns and a post office. It is also where three highways merge, U.S. Route 64 (US 64) from Hendersonville, U.S. Route 74A (US 74A) from Asheville, and North Carolina Highway 9 (NC 9) from Black Mountain, becoming Lake Lure Highway; which then continues in a southeasterly direction to Chimney Rock and Lake Lure.

== History ==
The area was first connected by a Drovers' road, a natural access into the interior of the Blue Ridge Mountains for drovers who were moving livestock, mostly flocks of turkeys and some geese, herds of hogs and some cattle in and out of the mountains to the markets. Established in 1798, it connected the area with Asheville, following on what is today US 74A. In 1879, the Bat Cave Post Office opened; previously known as Chimney Rock Post Office, it originally opened in 1843 (located where what is now Lake Lure) and had a series of closures before its relocation and renaming. The post office was destroyed, as was much of the community, during the flood of 1916, but was later rebuilt. In the 1920s, the Bat Cave community, and its famous cave, became a popular tourist attraction. The 186-acre (75 ha) Bat Cave Preserve was set up in response to that popularity and help protect the endangered Indiana bats as well as several other species of bats that inhabit the cave.

In 1948, Navy Captain George Bond established the Valley Clinic and Hospital. Five years later he was recognized as "Doctor of the Year.” In the 1970s, the Bat Cave Volunteer Fire Department was organized. Bat Cave faced significant damage from Hurricane Helene in 2024.

== Notable people ==
- George F. Bond – United States Navy physician in undersea and hyperbaric medicine.
- Michael Sherrill – Ceramist and sculptor.
- Melodie Sisk – Independent film producer and actress.
