= Green River (North Carolina) =

Stream in North Carolina, USA

Green River Tributary to Broad River
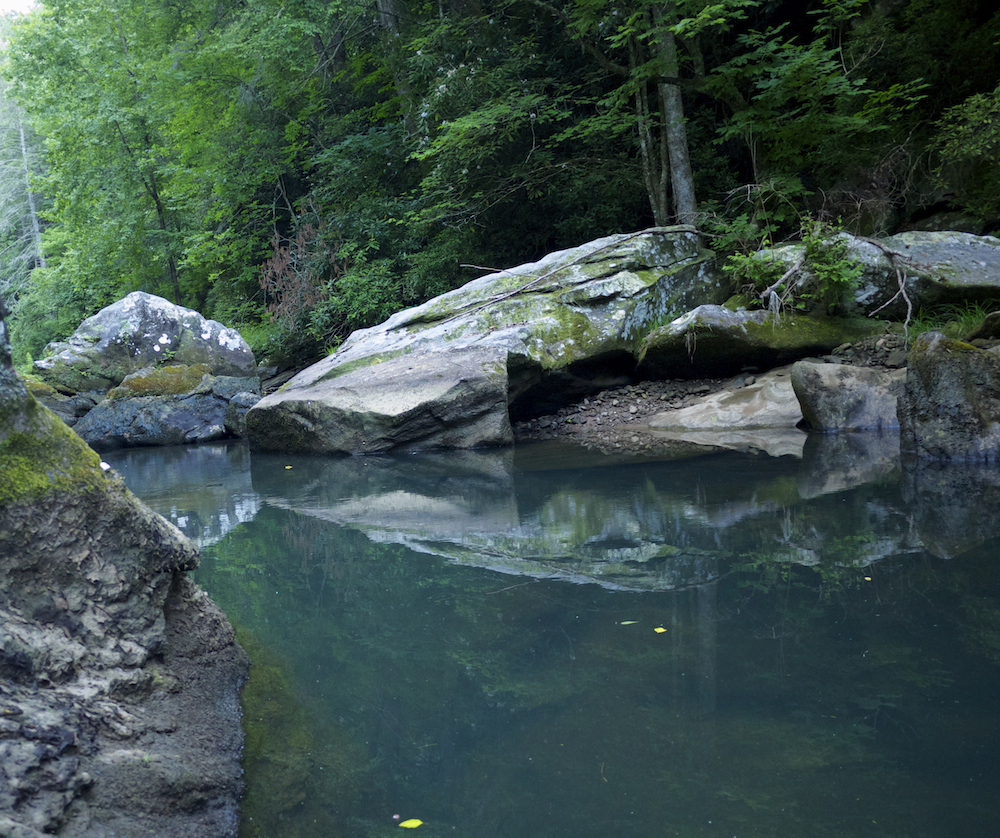
- Upper Green River during low flow below Lake Summit, North Carolina

- Location of Green River mouth

Location
- Country: United States
- State: North Carolina
- Counties: Henderson; Polk; Rutherford

Physical characteristics
- Source: divide between Green River and French Broad River
  - location: about 0.25 miles east of Green River Gap
  - coordinates: 35°09′47″N 082°35′06″W
  - elevation: 2,720 ft (830 m)
- Mouth: Broad River
  - location: about 0.5 miles upstream of Pores Ford Bridge
  - coordinates: 35°15′29″N 081°58′10″W
  - elevation: 720 ft (220 m)
- Length: 58.2 mi (93.7 km)
- Basin size: 241.02 square miles (624.2 km^{2})
- Discharge
  - location: Broad River
  - average: 520.59 cu ft/s (14.741 m^{3}/s) at mouth with Broad River

Basin features
- Progression: northeast then southeast
- River system: Broad River
- Tributaries
  - left: Long Rock Branch; Uncles Creek; Falls Creek; Meetinghouse Creek; Rock Creek; Joe Creek; Vernon Creek; Freeman Creek; Laurel Creek; Beek Creek; Hill Branch; Mill Creek; Hungry River; Pulliam Creek; Gadd Creek; Laurel Branch; Brights Creek; Panther Creek; Rotten Creek; Britten Creek; Walnut Creek
  - right: South Prong Green River; Shoal Branch; Bear Wallow Creek; Aaron Creek; Phillips Creek; Falling Creek; Terry Creek; Davis Creek; Jones Creek; Camp Creek; Cove Creek; Little Cove Creek; Silver Creek; Wheat Creek; White Oak Creek
- Waterbodies: Lake Summit; Lake Adger

The Green River is a dam-release river that flows through the mountains of North Carolina, south of Asheville. The Green has numerous tributaries, but much of its water flows from a confluence with Big Hungry Creek. The Green River itself is a tributary of the Broad River alongside other major tributaries such as the First Broad, Second Broad, and North Pacolet rivers. The river is dammed to form Lake Summit, in Tuxedo, North Carolina, and Lake Adger near Mill Spring, NC. The Green River is named for its deep green color but runs brown after heavy rains.

== Landscape ==
The Green River begins in the Blue Ridge Mountains of North Carolina and flows through the Blue Ridge Escarpment into the Piedmont. The river basin itself is not mainly sediment, but rather consists of metamorphic rock. The humid subtropical climate provides for moderate temperatures and relatively mild winters. The precipitation for the areas around the Green River typically ranges from 100 to 140 centimeters annually.

== Catchment and watershed ==
The Green River contains a catchment area measuring around 3.97 km² that takes up space within both Henderson and Polk counties. The catchment receives 1,280.50 mm mean annual precipitation, and maintains an average temperature of 15.14 C°.

On the other hand, the Green River watershed is much larger in size, as it covers 634.25 km² of area compared to the catchment area. The watershed also boasts a higher mean annual precipitation of 1,556.94 mm, but has a lower average temperature of 14.26 C°.

== Ecology ==
The area surrounding the river is all deciduous forest and is known for having some of the "highest floral and faunal biodiversity in the eastern United States." The Green River basin is typical of most southeastern mountain creeks as it is home to many animals, including deer and black bears. A few prominent deciduous trees in and around the Green River Basin are Maple, Birch, and Oak Trees. The Green River serves as both a source of fresh water to a specific ecosystem, as well as a source of food to many consumers.

== Angling ==
The population of freshwater trout draws many anglers to the slower-moving lower Green. The world record V-lip redhorse was taken from the Green River in 2018. The world record notchlip redhorse was also taken from the Green in 2018 by a different angler. The current North Carolina State Muskellunge record of 41 lb 8 oz was caught in Lake Adger in 2001.

== Whitewater sports ==
The Green River is well known for its different types of whitewater sports including whitewater kayaking, canoeing, and tubing. Because the flow of water is controlled by dam-release, the river has sufficient water to support whitewater sports approximately 300 days a year. This makes the Green River available for whitewater enthusiasts to use even when other popular rivers such as the Chattooga River and the Nantahala River do not have enough water flow to support whitewater kayaking or canoeing. The three main sections of the Green River are: The Upper Green, The "Narrows" section, and the Lower Green. While all of these stretches of water are very closely connected they each have unique terrain and characteristics, and each section tends to draw different types of boating.

=== Upper Green ===
This section of the Green River is frequently run by kayakers, as well as persons paddling whitewater canoes, and other types of solo boaters. It is approximately 3.7 miles in length and has an average gradient of 49 feet per mile. This top section of the Green River begins below the Tuxedo Hydro Station, which controls the water flow, and ends at the beginning of the "Narrows" section. Because it is directly above the "Narrows" section, the Upper Green is often used by whitewater paddlers to access the Narrows. With only two significant rapids (Class III), it is considered a moderately difficult section by most whitewater paddlers. This section of the Green is narrow and resembles what would be considered a creek, rather than an actual river. The hydrology and nature of the water on this particular section of water makes it a popular spot for playboating, a style of whitewater kayaking.

=== The Narrows ===
The "Narrows" section of the Green River has many qualities of a steep creek that drops between pools, and doesn't resemble many broad, slow-moving rivers in the southeast. John Pilson describes the Narrows as "boulder congested" with a "pool-drop character." This length of the river is considered an extremely difficult portion of whitewater, as it contains nine class IV rapids, and eight class V rapids (these being the most difficult runnable rapids). The first official descent of the Narrows was made in 1988, and it is still frequently paddled today. However, the Narrows are typically only paddled by seasoned whitewater boaters with an extensive knowledge of boating technique. Many whitewater enthusiasts have been injured here, and three qualified Class V boaters have died on the Green River. Three of the biggest and most notorious class V rapids on this section are known as the "Big Three." These are "Go Left and Die" (Class 5.1), "Gorilla" (Class 5.2), and "Sunshine" (Class 5.2). An incident on "Sunshine" rapid left one whitewater kayaker paralyzed.

This technical section of water is home to the Green River Race that is held every year on the first Saturday of November. The race typically involves many different classes of boats, and contains a section judged by time trial, as well as a head-to-head section of the race. Many paddlers consider the Green River Narrows race to be the pinnacle of whitewater racing in the southeast.

Part of the reason that the Narrows are so notable is because they have a downward gradient of over 100 feet per mile. The entire section of river is about 3 miles in length.

Following Hurricane Helene in September of 2024, the powerhouse which controls the release of water into the Narrows was partially destroyed by a landslide. Additionally, the force of the hurricane caused the course of the Narrows to completely change, with parts of the river increasing in width by hundreds of feet. This resulted in the cancellation of the 2024 installment of the Green River Race.

=== Lower Green ===
This run is frequented by both kayakers and tubers. Many local companies promote tubing as a type of "safe" whitewater tourism on the Green. The entire run is considered a class II section of water, appropriate for introductory level whitewater enthusiasts. This section of the Green River is very mild compared to its counterparts and is approximately six miles in length.

== Bridges ==
- Peter Guice Memorial Bridge (I-26)

== See also ==
- List of North Carolina rivers
- Narrows of the Green
