= East Flat Rock, North Carolina =

- Census-designated place
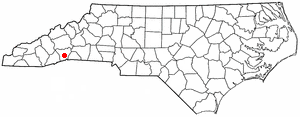
- Location of East Flat Rock, North Carolina
- Coordinates: 35°15′48″N 82°25′01″W
- Country: United States
- State: North Carolina
- County: Henderson
- Incorporated: 1926 (inactive)

Area
  - Total: 4.29 sq mi (11.11 km^{2})
  - Land: 4.28 sq mi (11.08 km^{2})
  - Water: 0.012 sq mi (0.03 km^{2})
- Elevation: 2,172 ft (662 m)

Population (2020)
  - Total: 5,757
  - Density: 1,345.6/sq mi (519.52/km^{2})
- Time zone: UTC-5 (Eastern (EST))
  - Summer (DST): UTC-4 (EDT)
- ZIP code: 28726
- Area code: 828
- FIPS code: 37-19420
- GNIS feature ID: 2402427

East Flat Rock is an unincorporated area and census-designated place (CDP) in Henderson County, North Carolina, United States. As of the 2020 census, East Flat Rock had a population of 5,757. It is part of the Asheville Metropolitan Statistical Area.

== History ==
East Flat Rock was an incorporated town from 1926 to 1948, after towns the charter was repealed by local government and later by the North Carolina General Assembly in 1949.

== Geography ==
East Flat Rock is located in southeastern Henderson County and is bordered to the west by the village of Flat Rock and to the northwest by unincorporated Barker Heights.

U.S. Route 176 (Spartanburg Highway) is the main road through East Flat Rock, leading northwest 3 miles (5 km) to Hendersonville, the county seat, and southeast 6 miles (10 km) to Saluda. Interstate 26 runs along the eastern edge of the community, with access from Exit 53 (Upward Road). I-26 leads north 27 miles (43 km) to Asheville and southeast 42 miles (68 km) to Spartanburg, South Carolina.

According to the United States Census Bureau, the East Flat Rock CDP has a total area of 4.3 square miles (11.1 km^{2}), of which 0.01 square miles (0.03 km^{2}), or 0.27%, are water.

== Demographics ==
Historical population
Census	Pop.	Note	%±
2000	4,151		—
2010	4,995		20.3%
2020	5,757		15.3%
U.S. Decennial Census

=== 2020 census ===
East Flat Rock racial composition
Race	Number	Percentage
White (non-Hispanic)	3,304	57.39%
Black or African American (non-Hispanic)	199	3.46%
Native American	18	0.31%
Asian	55	0.96%
Pacific Islander	43	0.75%
Other/Mixed	203	3.53%
Hispanic or Latino	1,935	33.61%

As of the 2020 census, East Flat Rock had 5,757 people, 2,138 households, and 1,322 families.

The median age was 38.1 years. 22.5% of residents were under the age of 18 and 16.1% were 65 years of age or older. For every 100 females, there were 98.5 males, and for every 100 females age 18 and over, there were 95.4 males age 18 and over.

99.7% of residents lived in urban areas, while 0.3% lived in rural areas.

Of the 2,138 households, 32.3% had children under the age of 18 living in them. Of all households, 42.9% were married-couple households, 19.1% were households with a male householder and no spouse or partner present, and 30.4% were households with a female householder and no spouse or partner present. About 28.0% of all households were made up of individuals, and 14.1% had someone living alone who was 65 years of age or older.

There were 2,286 housing units, of which 6.5% were vacant. The homeowner vacancy rate was 0.7% and the rental vacancy rate was 4.6%.

=== 2000 census ===
As of the census of 2000, there were 4,151 people, 1,647 households, and 1,133 families residing in the CDP. The population density was 1,279.1 inhabitants per square mile (493.9/km^{2}). There were 1,823 housing units at an average density of 561.7 per square mile (216.9/km^{2}). The racial makeup of the CDP was 85.69% White, 3.08% African American, 0.31% Native American, 0.29% Asian, 8.79% from other races, and 1.83% from two or more races. Hispanic or Latino of any race were 14.96% of the population.

There were 1,647 households, out of which 31.6% had children under the age of 18 living with them, 49.1% were married couples living together, 13.7% had a female householder with no husband present, and 31.2% were non-families. 26.0% of all households were made up of individuals, and 10.9% had someone living alone who was 65 years of age or older. The average household size was 2.49 and the average family size was 2.95.

In the CDP, the population was spread out, with 24.4% under the age of 18, 10.8% from 18 to 24, 30.6% from 25 to 44, 20.3% from 45 to 64, and 13.9% who were 65 years of age or older. The median age was 34 years. For every 100 females, there were 98.2 males. For every 100 females age 18 and over, there were 96.5 males.

The median income for a household in the CDP was $29,315, and the median income for a family was $31,286. Males had a median income of $22,500 versus $19,907 for females. The per capita income for the CDP was $13,723. About 14.0% of families and 20.6% of the population were below the poverty line, including 33.6% of those under age 18 and 15.4% of those age 65 or over.
