= Carl Sandburg bibliography =

This is a list of works written by the American poet, biographer, and journalist Carl Sandburg.

== Poetry ==
- In Reckless Ecstasy (The Asgard Press, 1904). (Note: Originally published as Charles Sandburg)
- Incidentals (The Asgard Press, 1904). (Note: Originally published as Charles Sandburg)
- The Plaint of the Rose (The Asgard Press, 1908). (Note: Originally published as Charles Sandburg)
- Chicago Poems (Henry Holt, 1916).
- Cornhuskers (Henry Holt, 1918).
- Smoke and Steel (Harcourt, 1920).
- Slabs of the Sunburnt West (Harcourt, 1922).
- Selected Poems (Harcourt, 1926).
- Good Morning, America (Harcourt, 1928).
- The People, Yes (Harcourt, 1936).
- Bronze Wood (Grabhorn Press, 1941).
- Poems of the Midwest (World Publishing Company, 1946).
- The Complete Poems of Carl Sandburg (Harcourt, 1950).
- Harvest Poems (Harcourt, 1960).
- Six New Poems and a Parable (University of Kentucky Press, 1961).
- Honey and Salt (Harcourt, 1963).
- Breathing Tokens (edited by Margaret Sandburg, Harcourt, 1978).
- Fables, Foibles and Foobles (University of Illinois Press, 1989).
- Billy Sunday and Other Poems (Harcourt, 1993).
- Selected Poems of Carl Sandburg (Harcourt, 1996).

== Prose ==
- You and Your Job (Charles H. Kerr & Company, 1908). (Note: Originally published as Charles Sandburg)
- Joseffy (1910). (Note: Originally published as Charles Sandburg)
- Clarence Darrow of Chicago (1919).
- Abraham Lincoln: The Prairie Years (Harcourt, 1925).
- The American Songbag (Harcourt, 1927).
- Steichen the Photographer (Harcourt, 1929).
- Mary Lincoln: Wife and Widow (Harcourt, 1932).
- Abraham Lincoln: The War Years (Harcourt, 1939).
- Storm over the Land (Harcourt, 1942).
- Home Front Memo (Harcourt, 1943).
- Remembrance Rock (Harcourt, 1948).
- Lincoln Collector: The Story of the Oliver R. Barrett Lincoln Collection (Harcourt, 1949).
- Always the Young Strangers (Harcourt, 1953).
- A Lincoln Preface (Harcourt, 1953).
- Abraham Lincoln: The Prairie Years and the War Years (Harcourt, 1954).
- The Sandburg Range (Harcourt, 1957).
- The Letters of Carl Sandburg (Harcourt, 1968).
- The Chicago Race Riots of 1919 (Harcourt, 1969).
- Prairie-Town Boy (Harcourt, 1977)
- Ever the Winds of Chance (University of Illinois Press, 1983).
- Carl Sandburg at the Movies (Scarecrow Press, 1985).
- The Poet and the Dream Girl: The Love Letters of Lilian Steichen & Carl Sandburg (University of Illinois Press, 1987).
- The Movies Are: Carl Sandburg's Film Reviews and Essays (Lake Claremont Press, 2000).
- The Sandburg Range (Harvest Books, 2001).
- Abraham Lincoln: The Prairie Years and the War Years (2007)

== Children's books ==
- Rootabaga Stories (Harcourt, 1922).
- Rootabaga Pigeons (Harcourt, 1923).
- Abe Lincoln Grows Up (Harcourt, 1928).
- Early Moon (Junior Literary Guild, 1930).
- Potato Face (Harcourt, 1930).
- Prairie-Town Boy (Harcourt, 1955).
- Wind Song (Harcourt, 1960).
- The Wedding Procession of the Rag doll and the Broom Handle and Who Was in It (Harcourt, 1967).
- The Sandburg Treasury (Harcourt, 1970).
- Rainbows Are Made (Harcourt, 1982).
- More Rootabagas (Alfred A. Knopf, 1993).
