= Fog (poem) =

Poem

Fog

The fog comes
on little cat feet.

It sits looking
over harbor and city
on silent haunches
and then moves on.

"Fog" is a poem written by Carl Sandburg. It first appeared in Sandburg's first mainstream collection of poems, Chicago Poems, published in 1916.

Sandburg has described the genesis of the poem. At a time when he was carrying a book of Japanese Haiku, he went to interview a juvenile court judge, and he had cut through Grant Park and saw the fog over Chicago harbor. He had certainly seen many fogs before, but this time he had to wait forty minutes for the judge, and he only had a piece of newsprint handy, so he decided to create an "American Haiku".

== Anthologies ==
This poem has been frequently anthologized. Perhaps the earliest was Untermeyer, Louis, ed. (1919), Modern American Poetry, Harcourt, Brace and Howe.

== Reception ==
Harriet Monroe, the editor of Poetry who first published several of the poems that went into Chicago Poems, said as part of her review of that collection:

I remember the emotion with which I first read many of these poems ... That first conviction of beauty and power returns to me as I read them again. This is speech torn out of the heart, because the loveliness of ... a fog coming on "little cat feet,"—the incommunicable loveliness of the earth, of life—is too keen to be borne ....

== Staging ==
In 1959 and 1960, Bette Davis and her husband Gary Merrill toured the nation, putting on The World of Carl Sandburg, a dramatic staged reading of selected Sandburg poetry and prose, culminating in a one-month run on Broadway (with Leif Erickson instead of Merrill). One review described highlights of Davis's performance, including:

... as if on catlike feet, she makes "Fog" seem new; ...

— Howard Taubman, New York Times, 9/15/1960, p. 44

== Recordings ==
- TC 1253

A vinyl LP of Carl Sandburg reading some of his poems, Carl Sandburg reading Fog and other poems was released on Caedmon (TC 1253) in 1968.
Description: 2s. : 33 1/3 rpm, stereo; 12in.
- Reviewed: J. R. S. (March 1969). "Reviewed work: Recordings from Caedmon. Thoreau: Civil Disobedience. Carl Sandburg Reading "Fog" and Other Poems". The English Journal. 58 (3): 467. JSTOR 811820:
  Although the poet's reading mannerisms are as pronounced as always, the effect in this recording is one of naturalness and spontaneity.
- An online link to Sandburg reading "Fog" is maintained by the state of Illinois.

== Influence ==
The poet Richard Brautigan wrote a parody of the poem around 1956.

The poem was once loosely paraphrased on a 2008 episode of The McLaughlin Group during which host John Mclaughlin and conservative commentator Pat Buchanan discussed the candidacy of 2008 Republican presidential nominee John McCain. This exchange was later revisited when Andrew WK included a version of the conversation in a rock anthem song he composed which was featured on Public Radio International.

The 2016 Video Game OneShot contains a reference to the poem on its official soundtrack, with the song played in the Refuge portion of the game being titled On Little Cat Feet.

In the 2017 film Alien: Covenant, the synthetic human character David uses the phrase "Me and fog on little cat feet" to describe how silently he walks.
