= Sandburg Mall =

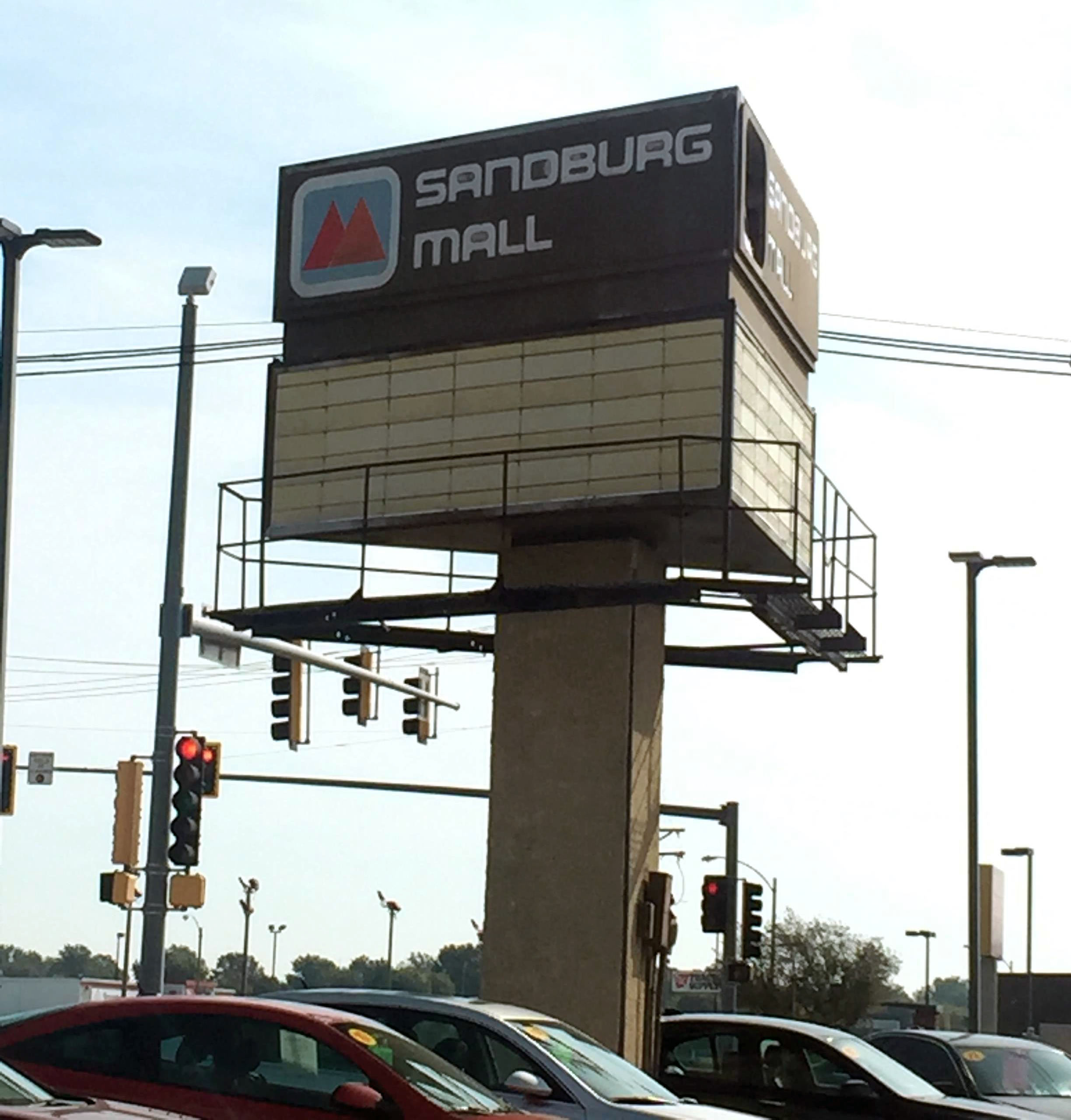
- Location: Galesburg, Illinois, United States
- Coordinates: 40.9730°N 90.3878°W
- Address: Henderson Street and U.S. Route 34
- Opened: October 1, 1975
- Closed: September 28, 2018
- Developer: Kenroy, Incorporated
- Architect: Sidney H. Morris & Associates
- Num. of stores: 50
- Num. of anchor tenants: 4 (All vacant)
- Floor area: 529,000 sq ft (49,100 m^{2})
- Floors: 1
- Parking: 3,700 spaces
- Public transit: Galesburg Transit

Sandburg Mall, a.k.a. Carl Sandburg Mall, was a shopping mall in Galesburg, Illinois. The mall operated as an enclosed shopping center from 1975 to 2018 with main anchor stores and a variety of interior stores. The interior mall was closed September 28, 2018, leaving just three businesses as of the 2020s—a car repair shop, a building supply outlet store, and a moving van rental operation. The mall's anchor stores were Sears, Bergner's, JCPenney, and Kmart.

== History ==
Carl Sandburg Mall was proposed and developed by Skokie, Illinois-based Kenroy, Incorporated beginning in 1971. The $15 million development was built beginning in February 1974 and continuing into 1975 on 97 acres near the intersection of Henderson Street and U.S. Route 34 in northwest Galesburg. The mall was named for poet and writer Carl Sandburg. Its original owner was Illinois-based mall developer General Growth Properties (GGP). Sandburg Mall opened on October 1, 1975. The original anchors were JCPenney, Bergner's, and Sears. The Mall expanded twice in 1982 and 1992 bringing about a two-screen cinema operated by Kerasotes Theatres and a fourth anchor when Kmart opened a location in the mall. In addition to the four anchors, Sandburg Mall has spaces for 46 interior stores and has two outparcel buildings for automotive centers. Original retailers included Osco Drugs, Bresler's Ice Cream, Team Electronics, Garcia's Pizza-in-a-Pan, GNC, Karmelkorn, and Musicland. In March 1994, a Target store opened next to the mall.

The mall began a downturn not long after its original owner GGP sold it in the late 1990s. The mall was operated next by Ken Tucker and Associates but the Galesburg area suffered through economic downturn including the closing of its Maytag appliance factory. As 30-year leases came due, many interior stores left the mall. Kerasotes closed the twin-screen cinema on December 18, 2003 creating an eight-screen theatre not far from the mall. With the mall heading toward greyfield status, a term associated with a dead or dying mall with high vacancy rates, it was purchased for $3.3 million by Sandburg Mall Reality Management in 2007. In 2014, the mall lost its first anchor when Sears closed April 30. Sandburg Mall Realty filed for bankruptcy and the mall was next offered in a sheriff's sale. The winning bidder was Mall Group Investments which paid $1.326 million for the mall in the Summer of 2015. During Mall Group's operation, the mall lost its second anchor when Kmart closed in July 2016.

The mall was purchased through an online property auction on October 25, 2016 for $690,000 by G.L. "Buck" Harris of Fort Worth, Texas. Harris had purchased other greyfield malls, including Six Flags Mall in Arlington, Texas, which closed in 2016 and Sunrise Mall in Corpus Christi which closed in 2018. Plans were announced a month after Harris' purchase of the Sandburg Mall that the interior of the mall would be demolished to create an outdoor plaza with the two remaining anchors staying in place. But that plan did not materialize and in 2018, the mall lost its two remaining original anchors when JCPenney closed in January and Bergner's closed in August. Access to Sandburg Mall's interior was closed off on September 28, 2018 when its final remaining interior store, GNC, closed and moved to a new location.

The mall continued with an automotive garage, which was joined by a moving van rental business in December 2018 and a builder supply outlet in February 2019 as its only operational retail outlets. The Galesburg Planning and Zoning Commission unanimously approved a proposal to slice the mall for expanded uses in April 2019. The first proposal was to turn the former Bergner's anchor into a Convention Center. That plan was replaced by creating a new home of the Lane A. Evans Veteran Affairs Community Based Outpatient Clinic that opened in November 2024. Urban adventurers documented the mall's degradation which included black mold.

On August 19, 2024, the Mall less three anchors was put up for auction with a minimum bid of $200,000 amid unpaid taxes and fines due to lack of upkeep. Nobody bid for the property. In December 2024, the property was purchased by two partners at Oak Advisors CPAs LLC of Houston. The two partners created Galesburg Investment LLC and stated that the only path forward would be to demolish the interior of the mall and unused Sears anchor store because the property could not be used in its current configuration. Asbestos and mold removal commenced in early 2026.
