= Joseffy (disambiguation) =

Joseffy may refer to:

- Josef P. Freud, Viennese magician known as Joseffy
- Josef Ichhauser, Polish-born singer and actor known as Josef Joseffy
- Rafael Joseffy, Hungarian pianist and composer
