= Paul Sample (artist) =

American painter

Paul Sample at work in his studio

Paul Starrett Sample (September 14, 1896 – February 26, 1974) was an American artist who portrayed life in New England in the middle of the 20th Century with a style that showed elements of "Social Realism and Regionalism."

== Early life ==
Sample was born in Louisville, Kentucky in 1896. After having moved across the country with his family on several occasions, Sample attended Dartmouth College in Hanover, New Hampshire. There he studied architecture and graduated in 1921 after a year in the Naval Reserve during World War I. While visiting his brother, Donald, at a sanatorium in Saranac Lake, New York, Sample contracted tuberculosis. For treatment of that disease he stayed for four years in Saranac Lake. There he met Sylvia Howland, whom he married in 1928.

== Career ==
At Saranac Lake, Sample studied drawing and painting under Jonas Lie. He then studied at the Art Students League of Los Angeles, and the Otis Art Institute in Los Angeles, California. There his work reflected social issues connected with the Great Depression with two noted paintings in 1931. In 1926 Sample joined the faculty of the University of Southern California in the school of architecture, where he remained until 1938. In 1938, he returned to New Hampshire to become the artist in residence at Dartmouth College, a position which he held until 1962. In addition to his social and regional paintings, Sample produced artwork for various magazines during World War II.

Sample did the cover art for Carl Sandburg's 1948 novel Remembrance Rock.

In 1941 he was inducted into the National Academy.

Sample died in Norwich, Vermont, on February 26, 1974.
