= Margarita Cordova =

Mexican American television actress (born 1939)

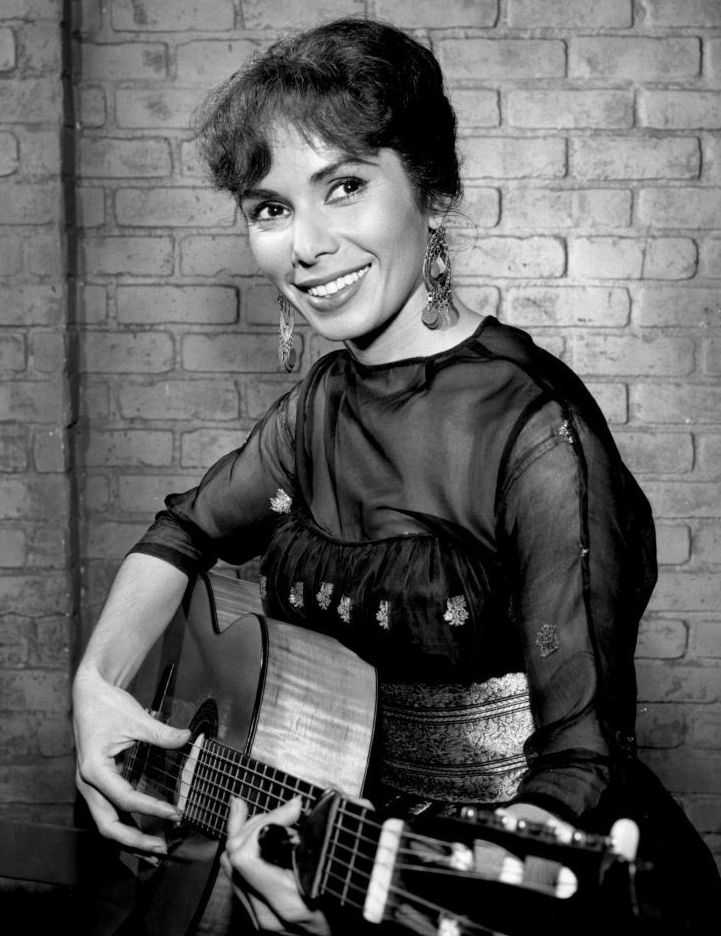
- Cordova in 1961.
- Born: February 26, 1939 (age 87); Saginaw, Michigan
- Occupations: Dancer, actress
- Years active: 1958–2006
- Spouse: Clark Allen

Margarita Cordova (born February 26, 1939, in Saginaw, Michigan) is a retired American dancer and actress.

== Early life ==
Cordova was born in Saginaw, Michigan, but grew up in Mexico City. When she was 14, she moved to Los Angeles.

== Career ==
=== Stage and dancing ===
In 1958, Cordova and her husband Clark Allen opened for a show starring Jean Arnold at the Cabaret Concert Theatre in Los Angeles. Variety described the couple as "Spanish dance exponents who take the trouble to explain what they're doing during their 30-minute stint. Education has not always been at home in a nitery, but it's a pleasure here [...] the team divides its work with the male member flicking the Spanish guitar and singing..."

In 1960, Cordova and Allen had a 30-minute show in New York. Variety wrote: "Although likeable (sic) in their current New York debut at Julius Monk's Downstairs at the Upstairs, they're not particularly outstanding. It could be that Allen's folksong selection lacks a powerhouse item".

In 1962, Cordova and Allen opened and operated El Cid, a flamenco nightclub on Sunset Boulevard in Los Angeles.

Cordova and Allen performed traditional Spanish and Mexican song and dance at other venues in the Los Angeles area, including Sportsmen's Lodge in Studio City and at the Ebell of Los Angeles Theater.

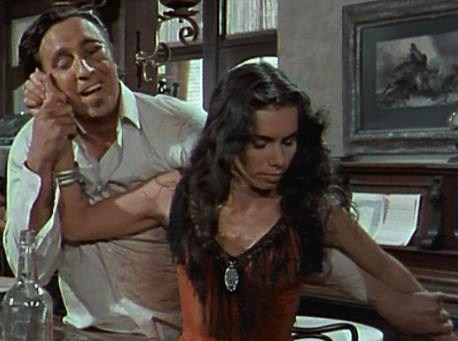
Timothy Carey and Cordova in One-Eyed Jacks (1961)

=== Television ===
Cordova has made numerous guest appearances on several television series from the 1960s, including The Twilight Zone episode "A Thing About Machines" and a 1960 episode of Peter Gunn entitled "Cry Love, Cry Murder". Her other television credits include Playhouse 90, The Chevy Mystery Show, Cheyenne, The Lloyd Bridges Show, The Farmer's Daughter, The Man from U.N.C.L.E., The Flying Nun, The Big Valley, Gunsmoke, The Virginian (TV series), Mission: Impossible, The Mod Squad, Marcus Welby, M.D., Lou Grant, Police Story, T.J. Hooker and Dallas.

Cordova had a contract role on NBC's short-living soap opera Sunset Beach as Carmen Torres from 1997 to 1999, receiving ALMA Award nomination for Outstanding Actress in a Daytime Soap Opera in 1999. She also played Rosa Andrade on Santa Barbara from 1984 to 1987, and from 1991 to 1993. In 2000s, she made guest appearances on Strong Medicine and Criminal Minds.

=== Film ===
Cordova appeared in One-Eyed Jacks (1961) as a flamenco dancer. She also had bit parts in Pay or Die! (1960), The Four Horsemen of the Apocalypse (1962) and Guns of Diablo (1965).

== Personal life ==
Cordova was married to musician, actor, and artist Clark Allen. They met in Paris. They studied in Granada, Spain for more than a year where they learned the culture of the Spanish Romani and flamenco music. The couple had two children: a daughter named Angela, who became a fine artist, and a son named David, who became a professional musician and photographer. Angela and David were members of the 1970s band Carmen. Cordova and Allen later divorced.
