= The Song and The Slogan =

The Song & the Slogan was composed by Daniel Steven Crafts in 1996, on commission from the late opera tenor Jerry Hadley. It sets to music sections of Carl Sandburg’s 1918 prose poem “Prairie” with excerpts from other Sandburg poems chosen by Hadley. The piece premiered in 2000 and was later made into a TV program for Public Broadcasting Service (PBS) Public television. The poem “Illinois Farmer” (which Hadley later called a depiction of his father) was set separately as a song and used as an encore at the premiere. In 2003, the production was awarded the Emmy for Best Music from the Mid-America Chapter of the National Academy of Television Arts & Sciences. The documentary was also nominated in three other categories: Best Direction, Best Photography, and Best Editing.

== Background ==
In 1996, the opera singer Jerry Hadley commissioned composer Daniel Steven Crafts to produce music for selected texts from “Prairie” and other Sandburg poems. The composer chose to include melodies resembling folk tunes in order to remain true to the traditional folk style prevalent in Sandburg’s work. The work premiered in 2000 and was made into a video premiering in 2002.

“Prairie” appears in Carl Sandburg’s Pulitzer Prize-winning collection of 103 poems, Cornhuskers, published in 1918. Opening with “I was born on the prairie and the milk of its wheat, the red of its clover, the eyes of its women, gave me a song and a slogan,” the narrator offers a vivid description of the prairie land with its lively stories. The prairie itself is also given voice: “The prairie sings to me in the forenoon and I know in the night I rest easy in the prairie arms, on the prairie heart.”"Illinois Farmer also appears in Cornhuskers.

== Description ==
The Song & the Slogan begins with a soft piano chord representing sunrise on the prairie. A cello then adds a short phrase to reflect vague outlines of shapes as the illumination of the landscape begins. The piano chord, demonstrating the vast expanse of the prairie, is heard again an octave higher and an octave lower. As the sun rises over the prairie, phrases from the cello and winds emerge as if from the darkness.

The narrative includes a collection of ideas from Sandburg's poetry: value clashes between Native Americans and European settlers, the folly of war, and the hope for peace and justice.

The middle section of The Song & the Slogan is taken from Sandburg's "The Road and the End" (1916). Solo voice and piano alone mark a stark contrast from the beginning section as the narration turns introspective and solemn.

The final section of the work is the "slogan," reflects Sandburg's writings on Abraham Lincoln. The piece ends with the piano chord of "the prairie" while the instruments replay their individual phrases.

== The world premiere ==
The world premiere of "The Song & the Slogan" took place on November 14, 2000, at the Krannert Center for the Performing Arts at the University of Illinois at Urbana-Champaign. The production featured opera tenor Jerry Hadley, a four-time Grammy Award-winning University of Illinois alumnus. The premiere also featured readings of selected Sandburg poems by David Hartman, a former host of ABC television's "Good Morning America." The music, composed by Daniel Steven Crafts was conducted by Paul Vermel and featured Eric Dalheim (piano), Barbara Hedlund (violoncello & associate producer), James Scott (flute), Alison Robuck (oboe), Solomon Baer (clarinet), Kazimierz Machala (French horn), Jordan Kaye (banjo), and Ricardo Flores (percussion). The song “Illinois Farmer” was sung as an encore.

== The performance documentary ==
The PBS video of The Song and The Slogan premiered on February 10, 2003. The film, produced by Tim Hartin, was awarded the Emmy for Best Music from the Mid-America Chapter of the National Academy of Television Arts & Sciences and also nominated for Best Direction, Best Photography, and Best Editing. During the summer of 2004, the video aired nationally on PBS.

As with the live premiere, the video features narration by David Hartman and singing by opera tenor Jerry Hadley. The music of classical composer Daniel Steven Crafts features pianist Eric Dalheim as the "heart of the prairie" and cellist Barbara Hedlund as "the soul of the prairie."
