= Chicago (poem) =

1914 poem by Carl Sandburg

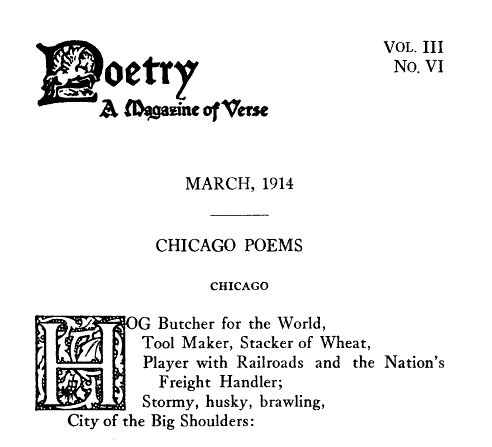
First publication

"Chicago" is a poem by Carl Sandburg about the city of Chicago that became his adopted home. It first appeared in Poetry, March 1914, the first of nine poems collectively titled "Chicago Poems". It was republished in 1916 in Sandburg's first mainstream collection of poems, also titled Chicago Poems.

Sandburg moved to Chicago in 1912 after living in Milwaukee, where he had served as secretary to Emil Seidel, Milwaukee's Socialist mayor. Harriet Monroe, a fellow resident of Chicago, had founded the magazine Poetry in 1912. Monroe liked and encouraged Sandburg's plain-speaking free verse style, strongly reminiscent of Walt Whitman. Chicago Poems established Sandburg as a major figure in contemporary literature.

Sandburg has described the poem as

a chant of defiance by Chicago... its defiance of New York, Boston, Philadelphia, London, Paris, Berlin and Rome. The poem sort of says "Maybe we ain't got culture, but we're eatin' regular."

The Chicago Poems and its follow-up volumes of verse, Cornhuskers (1918) and Smoke and Steel (1920), represent Sandburg's attempts to create an American version of social realism, writing expansive verse in praise of American agriculture and industry. All of these tendencies are manifest in "Chicago" itself. Then as now, the city of Chicago was a hub of commodities trading and a key financial center for agricultural markets. The city's function and ability to get product to market helped make it an international hub. These industries are mentioned in the poem.

One of Chicago's many nicknames, "City of the Big Shoulders," is taken from the poem's fifth line.

== See also ==
- Chicago Poems
