= Jerry Hadley =

American operatic tenor (1952–2007)

Jerry Hadley

Jerry Hadley (June 16, 1952 – July 18, 2007) was an American operatic tenor. He received three Grammy Awards for his vocal performances in the recordings of Jenůfa (2004 Grammy Award for Best Opera Recording), Susannah (1995 Grammy Award for Best Opera Recording), and Candide (1992 Grammy Award for Best Classical Album). Hadley was a leading American tenor for nearly two decades. He was mentored by soprano Joan Sutherland and her husband, conductor Richard Bonynge. Leonard Bernstein chose Hadley for his 1989 recording of Candide on Deutsche Grammophon. Aside from singing opera and operetta, Hadley also sang on Broadway.

== Early life and training ==
Hadley was born and raised on a farm near Manlius, Illinois, of Italian and English parents. He attended Bradley University in Peoria, Illinois, where he was a member of the Delta Nu chapter of Phi Mu Alpha, a men's music fraternity. Hadley first studied to become a conductor, but after four years turned to singing. He studied voice under Dr. John Davis while at Bradley, ultimately earning his master's degree in voice at the University of Illinois at Urbana–Champaign. At Illinois he studied voice with Grace Wilson and James Bailey, and coached with pianists John Wustman and Eric Dalheim. He starred in many School of Music opera productions, including Tamino in Mozart's The Magic Flute, Nemorino in Donizetti's L'elisir d'amore, Alfred in Johann Strauss II's Die Fledermaus, and Tom Rakewell in The Rake's Progress by Stravinsky.

== Career ==
Hadley married pianist Cheryll Drake and moved to Connecticut, where he took a job teaching music. In 1978 he began studying voice with Thomas LoMonaco, who would remain his teacher for the next 12 years.

Hadley's early years as a professional singer were spent in regional opera houses in the U.S. He impressed Beverly Sills, who had heard him in the National Opera Institute auditions in 1978 and offered him a New York City Opera contract. Hadley became a regular member of the roster of the New York City Opera after his debut there as Arturo in Lucia di Lammermoor in 1979.

In 1982 he made his first appearance at the Vienna State Opera as Nemorino in Donizetti's L'elisir d'amore. He frequently performed at the Metropolitan Opera, La Scala, the Royal Opera House at Covent Garden, the Deutsche Oper Berlin, the Hamburg State Opera, the Lyric Opera of Chicago, the San Francisco Opera, the San Diego Opera and the Glyndebourne, Aix-en-Provence and Salzburg festivals.

Hadley was known for his interpretations of lyric tenor opera roles as well as his performances of Broadway musicals, operetta, and popular music. One of his best-selling recordings was the EMI three-CD recording of the complete score of Show Boat, conducted by John McGlinn. Hadley sang the role of Gaylord Ravenal.

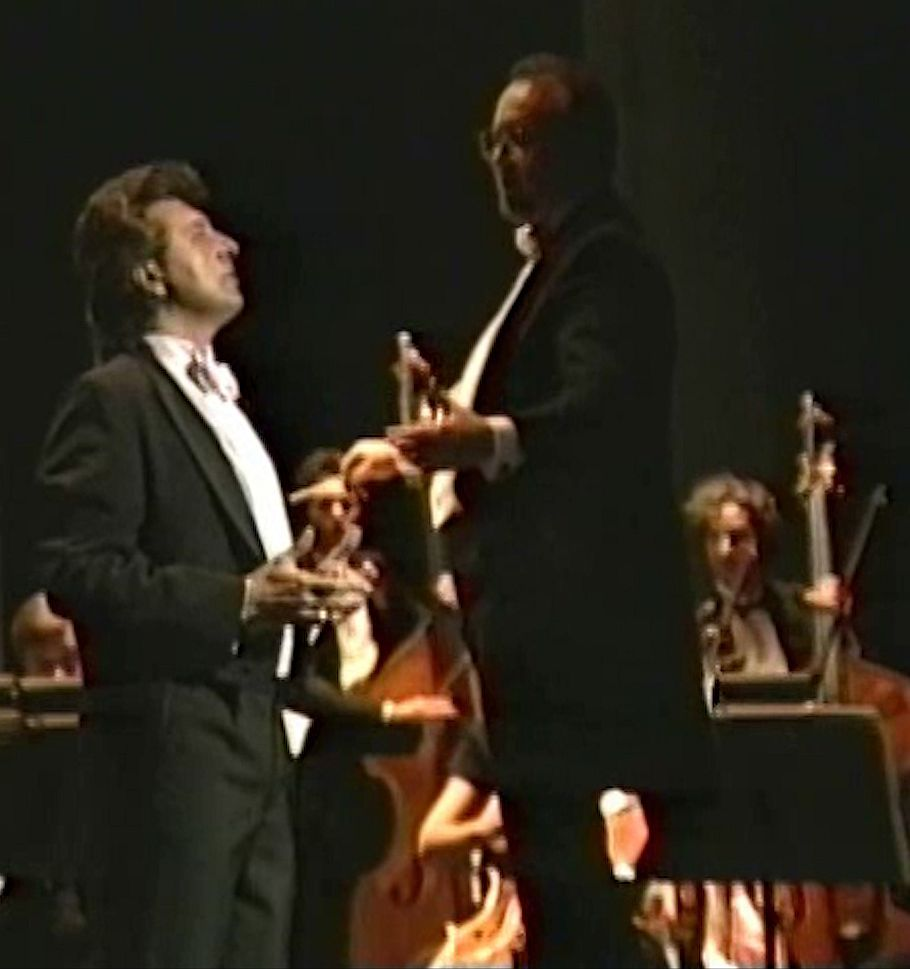
Jerry Hadley performing, 1994

Hadley sang the tenor roles of the bel canto repertory (Il Barbiere di Siviglia, L'elisir d'amore, Anna Bolena, La bohème, Lucia di Lammermoor) as well as Mozart (Così fan tutte, Don Giovanni, The Magic Flute, La clemenza di Tito) and the French Romantics (Les contes d'Hoffmann, Faust, Werther, Manon). He also sang as the tenor soloist in Handel's Messiah and Verdi's Requiem. He sang the role of Tom Rakewell in Stravinsky's The Rake's Progress for much of his career, first performing it while a graduate student at the University of Illinois.

In the early 1990s, Hadley appeared on The Long Goodbye, an album of reinterpretations of the music of Procol Harum featuring past and present members of the band, augmented by orchestra and guest vocalists; Hadley contributed an interpretation of "Grand Hotel".

In 1996, Hadley commissioned the composer Daniel Steven Crafts to set selected poems by Carl Sandburg to music. The work, The Song and The Slogan, premiered in 2000 at the University of Illinois, and was made into a PBS video, which won an Emmy Award for Best Musical Performance by the Mid-America Chapter of the National Academy of Television Arts and Sciences. Among the performers in the premiere were university professors and musicians with whom he had worked while a student, including pianist Eric Dalheim, conductor Paul Vermel, and cellist Barbara Hedlund.

Hadley created the role of Don Luis de Carvajal y de la Cueva, in Myron Fink's 1997 opera, The Conquistador, and the title role in John Harbison's 1999 The Great Gatsby, based on the novel of the same name. Outside of opera, in 1991 he created the tenor part in Paul McCartney's Liverpool Oratorio.

At the 1998 Salzburg Festival, Hadley sang the lead tenor role in Weill's Rise and Fall of the City of Mahagonny, a staging that was filmed and commercially released.

Hadley made many recordings, including bel canto roles conducted by Richard Bonynge, and was selected by Leonard Bernstein to sing the title role of his Candide for his 1989 recording for Deutsche Grammophon. The London performance of the operetta from that year with the same principal singers, including Hadley, was televised separately and commercially released.

In addition to operatic performances, Hadley also gave recitals in Europe and the United States, which regularly included American music. He performed frequently with the American conductor-pianist Alexander Frey, and at the time of Hadley's death they were planning to record two new solo compact discs of song repertoire of Austria and Hollywood. Hadley also performed frequently with pianist Eric Dalheim.

=== Divorce and later career ===
Following his divorce from Cheryll Drake in 2002, Hadley stopped performing until 2004.

On July 12, 2004, Hadley, with Sondra Radvanovsky, Marianne Cornetti, and John Relyea performed a critically acclaimed Verdi Requiem with the Pittsburgh Symphony Orchestra and the Mendelssohn Choir of Pittsburgh under the direction of Gilbert Levine.

On July 29, 2005, Jerry Hadley joined soloists Bożena Harasimowicz, Monica Groop, and Franz-Josef Selig, the Royal Philharmonic Orchestra and the London Philharmonic Choir, under conductor Gilbert Levine, in a gala performance of Beethoven's Missa Solemnis in Cologne Cathedral. The performance was broadcast live on 3sat throughout Europe and on PBS stations nationwide in the U.S. The performance was also released on DVD by Arthaus Musik.

Hadley's last operatic performances were in May 2007 in Brisbane, Australia, as Pinkerton in Madama Butterfly with Opera Queensland.

In a 2007 interview with The Courier-Mail, Hadley commented on his return to the stage after his long absence since his divorce: "A wounded bird cannot sing. It was tough. It was emotionally distressing and it goes straight to the throat. So I took some time off and sat in the quiet for a while. I never really understood how inseparable was the journey of the spirit and the journey of singing and making music. For the first time in my life I couldn't see a way forward. But I came out on the other side of it with a deeper appreciation of what a great gift and great opportunities God has given me."

== Death ==
On July 10, 2007, Hadley sustained a catastrophic brain injury after apparently shooting himself in the head with an air rifle at his home in Clinton Corners, New York. Hearing the shot, his fiancée called 911. Hadley was taken to St. Francis Hospital in Poughkeepsie, New York where CAT scans and X-rays showed severe brain injury; he was put on life support. On July 16, he was taken off life support. Hadley died two days later.

== Discography ==
- Jerome Kern: Show Boat, conducted by John McGlinn, EMI, 1988
- A Salute to American Music (Richard Tucker Music Foundation Gala XVI, 1991)
- Faust (Charles Gounod), Welsh National Opera Orchestra and Chorus, conductor: Carlo Rizzi (Teldec 1994)
- Werther (Jules Massenet), Lyon Opera Orchestra and Chorus, conductor: Kent Nagano (Erato Records 1995)

== Videography ==
- James Levine's 25th Anniversary Metropolitan Opera Gala (1996), Deutsche Grammophon DVD, B0004602-09
- The Song and the Slogan Commissioned by Jerry Hadley, composed by Daniel Steven Crafts to a text by Carl Sandburg and made into a program from PBS network.
