= Clark Allen =

American folk musician (1925–2008)

- Allen in The Twilight Zone, 1961
- Born: February 14, 1925; Baltimore, Maryland, U.S.
- Died: January 20, 2008 (aged 82); Los Angeles, California, U.S.
- Occupations: Entertainer, artist, businessman
- Spouse: Margarita Cordova

Clark Allen (February 14, 1925 – January 20, 2008) was an American entertainer, artist, and businessman.

== Early life ==
Allen was born in Baltimore. He attended Grossmont High School in El Cajon, California, graduating in 1942. His drawing of the original Grossmont's "Granite Castle" has become a symbol of the school's early history, and has appeared on their commemorative bronze plaques ever since.

== Performing career ==
In the early 1950s, Allen hosted and performed on his own radio and television show entitled: Songs of the Wanderer on the NBC network.

In 1958, Allen and his wife Margarita Cordova opened for a show starring Jean Arnold at the Cabaret Concert Theatre in Los Angeles. Variety described the couple as "Spanish dance exponents who take the trouble to explain what they're doing during their 30-minute stint. Education has not always been at home in a nitery, but it's a pleasure here [...] the team divides its work with the male member flicking the Spanish guitar and singing..."

In 1959–1960, he performed in Norman Corwin's adaptation of The World of Carl Sandburg which was a stage presentation from the works of the poet Carl Sandburg. The production starred Bette Davis. There was a 21-week national tour which co-starred Davis's husband Gary Merrill, and later Barry Sullivan. The final performances played for a month at the Henry Miller Theatre on West 43rd St in New York City during the fall of 1960. Allen played guitar and sang during the interludes of the production. He performed on-stage during the entire two-year run. Ilka Chase described him as a "talented young guitar player". Richard L. Coe called him "an ably ingratiating folk singer" after a performance at Constitution Hall.

In 1960, he and Cordova had a 30-minute show in New York. Variety wrote: "Although likeable (sic) in their current New York debut at Julius Monk's Downstairs at the Upstairs, they're not particularly outstanding. It could be that Allen's folksong selection lacks a powerhouse item".

As a screen actor, he was known primarily for guest appearances on television, some of which included The Twilight Zone in the 1961 episode "Five Characters in Search of an Exit" and Peter Gunn episodes "The Coffin" (1959) and "Mask of Murder" (1960).

In 1962, Allen and Cordova opened and operated El Cid, a flamenco nightclub on Sunset Boulevard in Los Angeles. Allen completed at least some of the renovations himself. They would also be the featured performers at the club for more than 18 years. In 1972, Allen was shot in the chest during a robbery at El Cid and nearly died from the wound. He was in and out of the hospital for three years. He later sold El Cid, which remains a flamenco venue.

Allen and Cordova performed traditional Spanish and Mexican song and dance at other venues in the Los Angeles area, including Sportsmen's Lodge in Studio City and at the Ebell of Los Angeles Theater.

== Art career ==
Allen was a fine artist and sculptor. Over the years, he painted in oils, watercolor, tempera, and ink. He had several successful art exhibitions, particularly at the Bowman-Mann Gallery on La Cienega in Beverly Hills. He painted abstracts, portraits, and landscapes, but his most common subjects were flamenco dancers and musicians. Actor Vincent Price was an avid collector of Allen's paintings.

== Personal life and death ==
Allen was married to television actress Margarita Cordova. Allen and Cordova lived and studied in Granada, Spain for more than a year where they learned the culture of the Spanish Romani and flamenco music. The couple had two children: a daughter named Angela, who became a fine artist, and a son named David, who became a professional musician and photographer. Angela and David were members of the 1970s band Carmen. Allen and Cordova later divorced.

Allen died on January 20, 2008, in Los Angeles of respiratory failure at the age of 82.
