= David Abbott (magician) =

American magician and writer

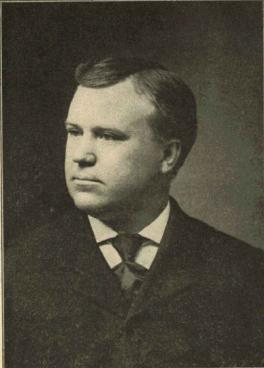
- Cover of Sphinx (October 1906)
- Born: David Phelps Abbott; September 22, 1863; Falls City, Nebraska Territory
- Died: June 12, 1934 (aged 70); Omaha, Nebraska, U.S.
- Resting place: Westlawn-Hillcrest Memorial, 5701 Center Street, Omaha, Nebraska
- Known for: Magician, author, inventor

David Phelps Abbott (September 22, 1863 – June 12, 1934) was an American magician, author and inventor known for creating effects such as the floating ball, as well as for his publications exposing mediums.

== Biography ==
David Abbott was born in 1863 near Falls City and lived most of his life in Omaha. He was married to Fannie E. Abbott. He became a wealthy businessman in the American Mid-West. He was well versed in arts and science. After Albert Einstein published his theory of relativity, Abbott attempted to explain it in a newspaper article.

As a magician, he performed for invited guests in his private theater he built at his home from 1907 until he died. There he demonstrated his Talking Teakettle (around 1907, decades before miniature radio electronics came into use) and Talking Vase (in 1909). Abbott built his work of magic and deception on the devious principles he learned from spirit mediums. Many of the greats in magic– Kellar, Thurston, Horace Goldin, Theo Bamberg, Ching Ling Foo, Blackstone and Houdini among others–made pilgrimages to Omaha Field Club neighborhood "Mystery House" to be dumbfounded and to learn.

Abbott was a friend of the magician Harry Houdini. His most well known work was Behind the Scenes with the Mediums published in 1907, which went through several editions.

In 1934, Abbott died of diabetes in Omaha. His burial was at Westlawn-Hillcrest Memorial Park, Omaha, Nebraska.

Abbott wrote a second full-length book, describing not only the séances given in his home but many magical feats which had astounded top professional performers; he died before it could be published, and for a long time the manuscript could not be found. When the Abbott home was sold in 1936, the manuscript was thought to be lost. It was discovered by Walter Graham and published as David P. Abbott's Book Of Mysteries in 1977.

In September 2024, Abbott's "House of Mystery" in Omaha, Nebraska, was purchased by Teller in partnership with the Omaha Magical Society with the goal of refurbishing the home to where Abbott's magic creations could once again be performed in the same setting where he performed them over one-hundred years ago.

== Publications ==
- Behind the Scenes with the Mediums (1907)
- Spirit Slate-Writing and Billet Tests (1907)
- The Marvelous Creations of Joseffy (1908)
- The History of a Strange Case (1908)
- The Spirit Portrait Mystery: Its Final Solution (1913)
- David P. Abbott's Book of Mysteries, published posthumously by Walter Graham (1977)
