= Daniel Steven Crafts =

American composer (born 1949)

Daniel Steven Crafts (born September 22, 1949) is an American composer. He was born in Detroit, Michigan, but has spent most of his life in the San Francisco Bay Area before moving to New Mexico.

== Composition style ==
Daniel Steven Crafts has chosen to oppose what he considers unjustifiably dissonant formalism prevalent in late 20th-century classical music. Instead, he emphasizes tonality in a dialectic between form and content.

Known for his strong sense of melody, the composer has written a variety of styles including operas, orchestral works, chamber music, concertos, and satirical pieces. Among Crafts' most well-known works is The Song & the Slogan, a collaboration with legendary opera star Jerry Hadley. Written for voice and orchestra, the piece is based on the poetry of Carl Sandburg. The work was made into a TV program for the PBS network and was aired nationally in 2004 with host David Hartman. The Song & the Slogan was awarded an Emmy Award in 2003 for Best Music by the Mid-America Chapter of the National Academy of Television Arts & Sciences.

Crafts also created the first comic-strip opera called Too Much Coffee Man in collaboration with Shannon Wheeler and Damian Willcox. He described the opera Too Much Coffee Man as belonging to a subgenre of classical opera called Gonzo Opera. While using the vocal techniques of traditional opera, gonzo opera uses wildly comical and satirical plots and situations, and is designed for small ensembles.

=== Awards ===
Emmy Award in 2003 for Best Music by the Mid-America Chapter of the National Academy of Television Arts & Sciences.

== List of works ==
=== Operas ===
- VS. - an opera for the sake of argument. A Gonzo Opera in one act. Libretto and original story by Rick Huff. For soprano, mezzo, tenor, 2 baritones, piano, flute, clarinet. Duration: 75 min.
- The Immature Burial. A Gonzo Opera from the Crypt in one act. Libretto and original story by Jonathan David Dixon. For mezzo, tenor, baritone, electronic keyboard, flute, clarinet. Duration: 1 hour.
- Blind Cupid On-line: The Dating Opera. A Gonzo Opera in one act. Libretto and original story by Miffy Gevar. For soprano, mezzo, tenor, baritone, piano, bass, flute, clarinet. Duration: 1 hour.
- The Other Side of the Veil. A Gonzo Opera from the Crypt in one act. Libretto and original story by Jonathan David Dixon. For mezzo, tenor, baritone, electronic keyboard, flute, clarinet. Duration: 1 hour.
- Down on the Pharma: The Medicine Show. A Gonzo Opera in one act. Libretto and original story by R Michael H. For soprano, mezzo, tenor, baritone, piano, bass, flute, clarinet. Duration: 1 hour.
- Bag Lady. A Gonzo Opera in one-act. Libretto and original story by Janice Leber. For soprano, mezzo, baritone, optional chorus, piano, bass, flute, clarinet. Duration: 50 minutes.
- Adonais. An opera in two acts about the poet John Keats. Libretto by Carla Maria Verdino-Sullwold, using poems and letter fragments of Keats, along with poems by Percy Bysshe Shelley and George Gordon, Lord Byron. For mezzo and tenor (primary roles), soprano, alto, tenor, 2 baritones, mixed chorus and medium-size orchestra.
- Baggage. A Gonzo Opera in two acts. Libretto and original story by Rick Huff. For mezzo and tenor (primary roles), soprano, 2 tenors, 2 baritones, piano, bass, flute, clarinet.
- Cyber Mom. A Gonzo Opera in one-act. Libretto and original story by Janice Leber. For soprano, mezzo, baritone, piano, bass, clarinet. Duration: 50 minutes.
- #trialbytext. A Gonzo Opera in one-act. Libretto and original story by Janice Leber. For soprano, mezzo, tenor, 2 baritones, piano, bass, flute, clarinet and bassoon. Duration: 55 minutes.
- Cellular World. A Gonzo Opera in one-act. Libretto and original story by Janice Leber. For soprano, mezzo, tenor, baritone, piano, bass, flute, clarinet and bassoon. Duration: 1 hour.
- Love at the Kitty Cat Hotel. A Gonzo Opera in three acts. Libretto and original story by Janice Leber. For mezzo, baritone, soprano, tenor, piano, bass, flute, clarinet and cello.
- All the Right Moves. A Gonzo Opera in one-act. Libretto by Thomas B. Woodward from his original play. For mezzo, baritone, soprano, tenor, piano, bass, flute, clarinet and bassoon.
- And the Winner Is.... A Gonzo Opera in one-act. Libretto by Thomas B. Woodward from his original prize-winning play. For mezzo, baritone, soprano, tenor, piano, bass, flute, clarinet and bassoon. Duration: 50 min.
- Sappho of Lesbos. An opera in three acts based on the novel Sappho, the Tenth Muse by Nancy Freedman. Libretto by Nancy and Benedict Freedman. Mezzo-soprano, baritone, tenor, alto, 7 sopranos, 1 high soprano, mixed chorus (including several short solo parts), and medium-size orchestra.
- La Llorona. An opera in three acts, based on the play by Rudolfo Anaya. Libretto by the author. Soprano, boy soprano, tenor, mezzo-soprano, 2 baritones and medium-size orchestra.
- Too Much Coffee Man. The first comic-strip opera, in two acts, based on the satirical cartoon character of Shannon Wheeler. Libretto by Shannon Wheeler, Damian Willcox, Carolyn Main, and the composer. Mezzo-soprano, tenor, baritone. Clarinet, bass, piano. Duration: Act one, 45 minutes. The Refill, 45 minutes.
- GASP!. A comic eco-operetta for children about the science of air and atmosphere!! Libretto and original story by Rick Huff.
- Bartleby, The Scrivener. An opera in two acts, based on the short story by Herman Melville. Libretto by Erik Bauersfeld. Baritone, tenor, baritone, bass and medium orchestra.
- Diary Of A Madman. One-act opera based on the story by Nikolai Gogol. Libretto by Erik Bauersfeld from his radio play adaptation. Tenor, baritone, soprano, bass and medium-size orchestra.
- Goblin Market. One-act opera based on the poem by Christina Rossetti for mixed chorus, soprano, mezzo-soprano, baritone with bassoon and piano. Duration: 45 minutes.
- Under A Halogen Sun. An opera in three acts. Original story and libretto by D. S. Black. Soprano, mezzo-soprano, 2 tenors, 2 baritones, 3 basses, chorus (with short solo roles for chorus members), and medium-size orchestra.
- The Furnished Room. An opera in one long act, based on the short story by O. Henry. Libretto by Richard Kuss. Tenor, 2 sopranos, mezzo-soprano; 2 contraltos, boy soprano, baritone, bass and medium-size orchestra. Duration: 1 hour, 30 minutes.
- The Pied Piper. An opera in one act based on the poem by Robert Browning. Libretto by Adam Cornford. For mixed chorus, soprano, tenor, baritone, piano and flute. Duration: 1 hour.

=== For solo voice ===
- Vocalise No. 1 - Navigating a Dew-Starred Laughing Labyrinth for coloratura soprano and piano.
- Dramatis Personae A setting of satirical poems by Denise Mordecai for voice and piano.
- The Cat and the Moon A setting of the poem by W. B. Yeats for voice and piano.
- Gothic Hauntings A work for tenor and orchestra.
  1. Annabel Lee Edgar Allan Poe
  2. Dream-Land Edgar Allan Poe
  3. La belle dame sans merci John Keats
- On Turning 70 Setting of a satiric poem by Kip Allen, for voice and piano.
- Als I lay on Yoolis Night an arrangement of the traditional carol.
- Do Not Weep, Maiden A setting for baritone and piano of the poem by Stephen Crane.
- Bury My Name. A theater work in two acts for baritone/actor and piano. Presentation of the Shakespeare authorship question.

Music:

  1. Introduction (Arrangement of "The Earl of Oxford’s Marche" by William Byrd)
  2. "Come, thou Monarch of the Vine" (Anthony & Cleopatra)
  3. Labour's Reward (Edward de Vere, 17th Earl of Oxford)
  4. "We are glad the Dauphin is so pleasant with us" (Henry V)
  5. "Alas, poor Yorick" (Hamlet)
  6. Bylbis and Caune (Ovid—translation credited to Arthur Golding, but likely at least in part by Edward de Vere)
  7. "While You Here Do Snoring Lie" (The Tempest)
  8. "Imagine that you see the wretched strangers" (The Boke of Sir Thomas More-Anon, but thought to be written by Shake-speare)
  9. "A Fool, a Fool, a Motley Fool" (As You Like It)
  10. Lord's monologue (Taming of the Shrew)
  11. Good Friend for Jesus’ sake forbear (Shaksper's Epitaph)
  12. Mad scenes (King Lear)
  13. Sonnet 72 (Shake-speare)
- Blow, winds, and crack your cheeks!. A setting of speeches from Shakespeare's King Lear, for baritone, tenor and orchestra (or piano reduction). (Can be done with just baritone.)
- Love’s Kaleidoscope. A love-song-cycle for Soprano and Tenor with string orchestra or piano reduction.
  1. To the Virgins / Upon Julia's Clothes / Chop Cherry (Robert Herrick) (Tenor)
  2. Matin Song (Thomas Heywood) (Soprano)
  3. The Passionate Shepherd to his Love (Christopher Marlowe) (Tenor)
  4. Love is Enough (William Morris) (Duet)
  5. Never Love Unless (Thomas Campion) (Soprano)
  6. Longing (Matthew Arnold) (Tenor)
  7. . Echo (Christina Rossetti) (Soprano)
  8. Return (John Wilmot, 2nd Earl of Rochester) (Tenor)
  9. Farewell, Ungrateful Traitor (John Dryden) (Soprano)
- From a Distant Mesa. For tenor and orchestra (commissioned by Jerry Hadley). (2222/433/per./strings) Duration: 45 minutes.
  1. Spider Woman (Adam Cornford)
  2. Cancion al Rio Grande (Rudolfo Anaya)
  3. Being the Waters (V. Barrett Price)
- Wordless Duets for soprano, tenor, and piano.
  1. Ever Lost in Prescient Felicity
  2. Distance Over Long Introspection
  3. Dreams of Fears Irrelevant
- The Real Shake-speare. A cycle of 5 songs, settings of poems by Edward de Vere, the actual author of the Shakespeare plays and sonnets. For voice and piano. Duration: 15 minutes.
  1. I am Not as I Seem to Be
  2. Revenge of Wrong
  3. Were I a King
  4. Reason & Affection
  5. Labour and Its Rewards
- Cat Stories. A song-cycle of poems about cats for voice and piano. Duration: 12 minutes.
  1. Verses to a Cat (Percy Bysshe Shelley)
  2. The Owl & the Pussycat (Edward Lear)
  3. On the Death of a Cat (Christina Rossetti)
  4. Cat Stretching
  5. Elegy to a Favourite Cat (Thomas Gray)
- Six Wordless Arias. For voice and piano (written for Deborah Benedict).
- Kubla Khan. A setting of the poem by Samuel Coleridge for bass and orchestra.
- The Song and the Slogan. A setting of poetry by Carl Sandburg. For orchestra with harmonica, solo cello. Version for flute, oboe, French horn, harmonica, banjo, cello, piano and tenor. (Commissioned by Jerry Hadley for performance in 2000.) Awarded an Emmy Award in 2003 for Best Music by the Mid-America Chapter of the National Academy of Television Arts & Sciences. Duration: 35 minutes.
- Illinois Farmer. Setting of a poem by Carl Sandburg for voice and piano. (Commissioned by Jerry Hadley for performance in 1998.) Duration: 4 minutes.
- Who’s Who. A satirical song-cycle from a text by Denise Mordecai for voice and piano. Duration: 4 minutes.
- La belle dame sans merci. Setting of a poem by John Keats for tenor and orchestra.
- Music, when soft voices die... Setting of a poem by Percy Bysshe Shelley for voice and piano.
- To His Coy Mistress. Setting of a poem by Andrew Marvell for tenor and piano.
- Bittersweet Dreams. Three poems by Christina Rossetti for soprano and piano. (Written for Deborah Benedict.)
- The Houses of Iszm. Setting of a poem by Adam Cornford for tenor and orchestra (or piano). (Written for Jerry Hadley.)
- Ozymandias. Setting of a poem by Percy Bysshe Shelley for male voice and piano.
- Jabberwocky. Setting of a poem by Lewis Carroll for male voice and piano.
- Lines to a Reviewer. Setting of a poem by Percy Bysshe Shelley for voice and piano.
- Contemporaries for Voice and Piano. Setting of found texts for voice and piano.
  1. Personals
  2. Disabling a Computer with a Hammer or Other Heavy Blunt Instrument is Still Legal in Most States
  3. Language of the Bard
  4. You're Going to Need a Lawyer!
- Songs of Innocence & Experience. A complete setting of the poem cycles by William Blake for four voices and orchestra.
- Songs of Experience. Excerpt for tenor and orchestra "Little Girl Lost / Little Girl Found / The Tyger".
- Three Blake Songs for soprano and string orchestra. Version for soprano and piano; and for soprano and string quartet (arrangement made for Deborah Benedict).
- Annabel Lee. A setting of the poem by Edgar Allan Poe for tenor and piano. (Written for Jerry Hadley.)
- She Walks in Beauty. A setting of the poem by Byron for tenor and piano.
- Vocalise No. 3. Virtuoso work for soprano and piano, or mezzo-soprano and piano.
- In proud and glorious memory. Setting of anti-war poems by Siegfried Sassoon for baritone and string orchestra with snare drum and tympani.

=== Theatrical works ===
- The Curious Conundrums of Dexter Fitzkibble - a theater work for 4 or more actors, Flute, clarinet, bassoon, bass, piano
- Otter's Odd Adventure – for narrator and orchestra. Story by Adam Cornford and D. S. Crafts
- Bury My Name – A theater work in two acts for Baritone / Actor and Piano. Concerning the authorship question of the works traditionally known as "Shakespeare"
- Out of the Clauset (An off-season Kris mess) for narrator and instrumental ensemble Story by Rick Huff

=== Choral works ===
- I Weep for Adonais/The breath whose might I have evoked…. Two choruses from the opera Adonais for mixed chorus and orchestra, or piano reduction. Text by Percy Bysshe Shelley.
- There was a naughty boy.... Setting of a poem by John Keats for mixed chorus and piano.
- The Jumblies. Setting of a poem by Edward Lear for unaccompanied mixed chorus.
- Hyacinth Moon Reflections. Setting of 6 poems by Abbot Small, for unaccompanied mixed chorus.
- Song of the Shepherds. Christmas work—setting of a poem by William Morris. (Arrangements for solo singer and piano, and mixed chorus and piano). Duration: 3 minutes.
- To a Strange Land for children's chorus, based on poems written by elementary school children under the tutelage of Adam Cornford. Duration: 20 minutes.
- Vocalise No. 2 for male chorus. Duration: 8 minutes.

=== For orchestra ===
- Dance of the Deranged Composer -- a Halloween Hysteria (2222/423/strings)
- La Llorona - symphonic poem (2332/4331/3 perc, x, tym, pno/strings)
- In memoriam WRC (2222/423/strings)
- Yuletide Revels (2222/423/strings)
- Turtle Island – symphonic poem (2222/423/2 perc/ strings)
- Symphony No. 17 Oxford Symphony (four movements). (2222/423/strings)
  1. A spirit raised from depth of underground (Henry VI-2)
  2. While counterfeit supposes bleared thine eyne (Taming of the Shrew)
  3. You are not ipse, for I am he (As You Like It)
  4. Let my name be buried (Sonnet 72)
- Symphony No. 16 (four movements). (2222/423/strings)
  1. Encroaching on whimsically unsustainable prerogatives
  2. Softly sleeps the calm ideal in the whispering chambers of imagination
  3. Weighing one's thoughts upon a hyper-active scale
  4. Pacification of the Under-Clichéd
- Symphony No. 15 (four movements). (2222/423/pno/strings)
  1. The perpetuity of invented realism
  2. Notice will Be Taken
  3. Momentous light of an alien world
  4. Horizontal Demons Suspended in Spider-Clusters of Luminous Eyes
- Symphony No. 14 (four movements). (2222/423/pno/strings)
  1. The essential power paradigm of updating potential professional apoplexy.
  2. Liminal Illuminations Robed in sunset colors
  3. Soon to be picturesque ruins
  4. Squirrels in Spaghetti
- Symphony No. 13 (four movements). (2322/423/pno/strings)
  1. The emotional geography of truth is a defensive and offensive pact simultaneously.
  2. The migration of a binary dimension
  3. Prohibited Diversions Distilled from Unknown Fruit
  4. The Lascivious Grace of Nervous Dilettantes in Evening Wear
- Symphony No. 12 (four movements). (2222/423/strings)
  1. An emotional map of the domination of commodities
  2. Escaping the organization of re-processed images.
  3. The weight of a mythical past lies festering on the future.
  4. Irradiated Harmonies with which the Overcritical May Strangle Themselves
- Symphony No. 11 (four movements). (2322/42/2perc.,/strings)
  1. All that was once lived has moved into its own re-presentation.
  2. Cardboard Control Panels Registering the Sound of Internal Transparency
  3. The Psychogeography of a Reconstituted Logos
  4. Careening Over the Cliff of Pre-History
- Symphony No. 10 (four movements). (2232/433/tym.,perc.,/strings)
  1. Intangible Gridirons Marking the Anesthesia of Self-Knowledge
  2. Movement in which the Orchestra Sheds Its Skin
  3. The Fractured Soul of Alienation
  4. Currents of Bilocated Time Moving Epileptically To Create a Subconscious Paradox
- Symphony No. 9 (four movements). (2332/433/tym.,perc.,/strings)
  1. Through the Gates Delinquent
  2. A Decision Forest Labyrinth of Untrammeled Contemplation
  3. The Conductivity of Electric Reason Dismisses an Impossible Proclamation
  4. Driving the freeway of quantum gravity
- Symphony No. 8 (four movements). (2232/433/tym.,perc.,/strings)
  1. The Vandalism of the Ozone of Human Desire
  2. Indulgent amorevolezza
  3. Metaphorical Combustion Born of Clandestine Schizophrenia
  4. Forgotten Ancestors Revealing Clues Leading to Forbidden Caches
- Now the Harsh Land Unfolds its Secret Beauty for string orchestra. Duration: 8 minutes.
- Fanfare Overture: Red or Green?. (Commissioned by the New Mexico Symphony Orchestra to celebrate its 75th anniversary.) (2222/433/tym.,xyl.,3perc./strings) Duration: 6 minutes.
- Symphony No. 7 (four movements). (2232/433/tym.,perc.,/strings)
  1. Despite a Sense of Humor, the Double Negative Fails to Apply [12:38]
  2. An interlude of self-infiltrated cosmography [5:00]
  3. Suppressed transition that unites all contrasts [5:30]
  4. A sojourn of an untaxed countenance delivered to a paradise of oblivion
- Symphony No. 6. (four movements). (2232/433/tym.,perc./strings)
  1. Mind and matter glide swiftly into the vortex of immensity [12:50]
  2. The Irregular Conditional Past Subjunctive Third Person Singular Form of Twitter Is Always Difficult.
  3. Deep impressions divorced from reverence
  4. Tumultuous Preoccupation with Lurking Throughfares
- Entrance to the City of Proud Fancy. (Commissioned by the Northwest Symphony to celebrate its 50th anniversary.) (3222/434/tym.,2perc./strings) Duration: 8 minutes.
- Tale of the Otter. An original satire for narrator / comedian and orchestra, written with Adam Cornford (2222/433/tym.,perc./strings)
- Symphony No. 5 Sinawava sinfonia (3333/4331/tym.,perc./strings) Duration: 30 minutes.
  1. Entrance from the East
  2. Eagles' Landing
  3. The Narrows
  4. The Great Arches
- Symphony No. 4 (four movements). (2232/433/tym.,perc./strings)
  1. A most unusual instance of penetration
  2. There are no Seasonings in a Sacrificial Stew
  3. Let's Play With Matches on Company Time
  4. The Fractured Soul of Alienation
- Symphony No. 3 (four movements - 2222/433/perc.,piano/strings)
  1. An Enigmatic Costume for the Masquerade of Ages
  2. There are TV Stations Devoted Entirely to What Someone Can Do with a Ball.
  3. Neglecting to Experience Space and Time
  4. Which Suggests the Opposite of Stark-Raving Logic.
- Symphony No. 2 The Ingrown Improbability of Cuthbert Shoutpenny (one continuous movement). (2222/433/perc./strings)
- Symphony No. 1 (four movements). (2222/433/perc.,piano/strings)
- Contemporaries for Orchestra. A set of eight relatively short individual works with satirical titles. (3333/4331/tym.,3perc.,piano/strings) Total duration: 35 minutes.
  1. Sound Bites Ripping Through the Fabric of Time
  2. The Blue Sky Will Remain Grey Until it is Reinvented
  3. Opera Without Words—No Singing! Just the Music!
  4. Traces of Relationship Having Fallen Among Office Machines
  5. Still Looking for a Way Out of the Nightmare that is the 20th Century (A Re-Viewing of "The Scream" by Edvard Munch)
  6. Helpless Amusement at the Recurrence of One's Own Obsessions
  7. Advertising is the Worst Form of Graffiti
  8. Fallen Angels Sipping Diet Soda
- Orchestral Suite. (2222/423/tym.,2perc.,piano/strings) Duration: 25 minutes.
  1. Prelude
  2. Hip Hop
  3. Funky Chicken
  4. Country Waltz
  5. Slam Dance
  6. Truckin'
  7. Too Breezy for Funk
  8. Finale
- Theater Of Operations. (3332/433/tym.,xyl.,3perc.,piano/strings) Duration: 13 minutes.
  1. The Battle Hymn of Everyday Life
  2. Isn't this the promised future in which all drudgery would be done by machines leaving leisure time for all?
  3. Let's play with matches on company time
- Ode To The Furies. (3332/433/tym.,xyl.,3perc,piano/strings) Duration: 7 minutes.
- Alienation. A setting of a poem by Adam Cornford for speaker and orchestra. (2322/423/perc/harp/strings) Duration: 15 minutes.
- Songs of Experience. Instrumental excerpts from the larger vocal work. (2333/4331/tym.,perc./strings) Duration: 14 minutes.
- My Mistress Suite (four movements). Based on music of Johannes Ockeghem. Flute, oboe, English horn (or clarinet), two horns, strings. (Commissioned by Kent Nagano for the Berkeley Symphony.)
- The Persistence of Amnesia for big band ensemble. (Commissioned by Jaap Dercksen for De Volharding Orchestra of Amsterdam.)

=== Concertos ===
- Oboe Concerto (three movements). (2222/423/strings).
- An Iconoclast Savors the Effects of Too Much Coffee. (Concertino for Clarinet and String Orchestra). Also arranged for clarinet and piano. Duration: 10 minutes.
- Designing a Virtual Reality for a Landscape that Never Was for bassoon and orchestra. (2222/423/strings).
- Bassoon Concerto (three movements). (2232/423/tym.,perc./strings).
- Piano Concertino No. 2 (three movements). (2222/310/tym.,perc./strings) (written for student performer).
- Piano Concertino No. 1 (three movements). (2222/310/tym.,perc./strings) (written for student performer).

=== For solo piano ===
- The reticent realm of ethereal atoms. Duration 5:00
- Bury My Name. Music accompanying the stage play about the Shake-speare authorship question.
- Fantasia in no particular key. Duration: 5 minutes.
- Rhapsody on Russian-Jewish Folk-Themes. Duration: 10 minutes. (Written for Rozalina Gutman.)
- Contemporaries for Piano. Duration: 25 minutes.
  1. Man attempting to work with a computer whose program is faulty.
  2. Three Tel-Evangelists on wings.
  3. 'It's fantastic! The entire spinal cord is missing!'
  4. Child frustrated from watching too much TV.
  5. Clouds whose shadows form the shapes of inviting erotic objects.
  6. Woman deciding whether grocery coupons are worth cutting out of the newspaper.
  7. Waiting in line to correct a mistake that is not your own.
  8. The horror of shopping malls.
- Piano Suite. Duration: 25 minutes.
  1. Prelude
  2. Hip Hop
  3. Funky Chicken
  4. Country Waltz
  5. Slam Dance
  6. Truckin'
  7. Too Breezy for Funk
  8. Finale

=== Chamber music ===
- Contemporaries for Woodwind Quintet. (Flute, Oboe, English Horn, Clarinet, Bassoon)
  1. Digital Storage Capacity Conduit Blamed in CEO Sex Scandal
  2. Connecting the Dots to a Session of Aversion Therapy
  3. Games are Strictly Forbidden Within the Confines of the Labyrinth
  4. Repackaging the Past into Future Commodities
  5. Survey Says On-Line Matchmaking Sites Lead to Increased Language Skills
  6. A Carpet Shampoo Trainee Discovers He Has Used Bug Repellant on his Last Job
  7. Preserving the True Spirit of Black Friday
- Contemporaries for Cello and Piano.
  1. The True Value of a Commodity Is How Much You Can Get for it at a Garage Sale
  2. The Last Evening of Night Sky Before the Orange Street Lights Went In
  3. Inciting Endangered Species to Civil Disobedience
  4. Touring the Convenience Store "Hall of Fame"
  5. A Classic Movie with No Commercial Potential is at Long Last Released in DVD Format
  6. The Economy Is a Nightmare from Which Work Is Trying to Awake
- Prairie Mother Suite for cello and piano (written for Barbara Hedlund). Duration: 8 minutes.
  1. Info Babe Answers the E-Mail
  2. Prairie Mother in her studio late at night with a cup of decidedly NOT decaffeinated coffee
  3. Super Xerox Woman makes a Midnight Run
  4. Gig Mama Sets the Schedule
- String Quartet
  1. Quantum Entanglement Cultivating an Over-Civilized Sense of the Absurd.
  2. Recalcitrant Rhymes of Forgotten Ancestors Lost in Labyrinthine Memory.
  3. High-Resolution Scan Confirms Exclusive Existence of Dysfunctional Economy.
- In Memoriam for cello quartet or cello ensemble. Duration: 6 minutes.
- Contemporaries for Flute and Piano. Duration: 25 minutes.
  1. A Meter maid attempts to give a parking ticket to an aggressive alcoholic who has just arrived with three more dimes.
  2. Studies show people feel happy under blue light.
  3. On discovering the joys of designer latex.
  4. A game-show contestant talks about her deepest desires.
  5. Overhearing a real estate deal while talking on a cordless phone.
  6. Modular living offers something for everyone.
  7. Tropopause—that quiet feeling above all turbulence at 35,000 feet.
  8. On the fast track to a questionable destination.
- Contemporaries for Viola and Piano (for clarinet and piano). Duration: 20 minutes.
  1. Dance of the Spin Doctors.
  2. When the teleprompter fails, a newscaster is forced to improvise.
  3. Driving under the influence of a bad-hair day.
  4. A software engineer dreams of floating in a sea of decaffeinated coffee.
  5. After losing the fight to save an ancient tree from the teeth of a new housing development.
  6. Throwing a rock through the “window of opportunity”.
  7. When the “bottom line” hits rock bottom.
- Soap Opera Septet for flute, violin, cello, electric keyboard, bass, percussion and tape recorder. Based on actual TV soap opera broadcasts.
- Vocalise No. 1 for vocal soloist and computer controlled piano.
- Fantasia for violin and computer-controlled piano. Same work as Vocalise No. 1 rescored for violin instead of vocal soloist.
- Ghouls for French horn and tuba. Also arranged for cello and double bass, or 2 cellos. Duration: 4 minutes.
- Trio for flute, viola, guitar. Also arranged for violin, viola and cello.
- Fanfares for Vernal Equinox, Summer Solstice, Autumnal Equinox, Winter Solstice for brass quintet. Duration: 3 minutes each.
- In Memorium—Christopher Cornford for string quartet or string orchestra. Duration: 5 minutes.

=== For tape recorder ===
- Snake Oil Symphony. (In the permanent archives of the Institut International de Musique Electroacoustique de Bourges in the French National Library.)
- Soap Opera Suite
- Fundamentals. A theater/performance work written with Adam Cornford.
- Ad Nauseam. A theater/performance work written with Adam Cornford.
- Tape Composition No. 5 “The Society Of The Spectacle”
- Tape Composition No. 4 “Tortured By Demons”
- Tape Composition No. 3 “At the Movies”
- Tape Composition No. 2
- Tape Composition No. 1
