= Oliver R. Barrett =

American lawyer, author and collector (1873–1950)

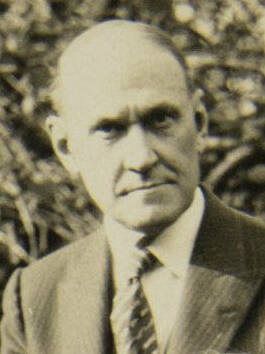
- Born: October 14, 1873; Jacksonville, Illinois, United States
- Died: March 5, 1950 (aged 76)
- Education: University of Michigan
- Occupations: Lawyer; author; collector

Oliver Rogers Barrett (October 14, 1873 – March 5, 1950) was an American lawyer, author, and prolific collector of Abraham Lincoln artifacts.

== Early life ==
Barrett was born in Jacksonville, Illinois on October 14, 1873, but he grew up in Pittsfield. As a child, he visited Springfield and purchased some of his first Lincoln artefacts, which marked the beginning of his collection. By his teens, Barrett developed a passion for collecting and frequently advertised in weekly newspapers for autographs, artefacts, letters, and other materials, particularly those connected to Abraham Lincoln. He eventually received his law degree from University of Michigan in 1896, and made his career as a lawyer in Peoria. His law work was temporarily interrupted while he in the Spanish–American War as a private in the Fifth Illinois Volunteers in April 1898. He left the army in November 1899 without having fought.

== Lincoln collection ==
In 1905, Barrett moved from Peoria to Chicago and developed an obsession with building his Abraham Lincoln collection. This collection earned him fame among Lincoln scholars and researchers, most notably Carl Sandburg, and they met in 1924, becoming friends and then collaborators in the mid-1930s, with Sandburg also becoming a client of his law practice. With Sandburg's help, Barrett wrote a book entitled Lincoln's Last Speech in Springfield in the Campaign of 1858 in 1924. Sandburg also wrote a book about Barrett's collection, Lincoln Collector: The Story of the Oliver R. Barrett's Great Private Collections, published in 1949.

== Death ==
Oliver R. Barrett died on March 5, 1950. State-wide efforts were made to have his collection purchased by the Illinois State Historical Library, however these efforts failed, and his collection was sold at auction by Parke-Bernet Galleries on February 19-20, 1952. Barrett's collection was valued at over $400,000.
