= Chicago Poems =

Book by Carl Sandburg

- First edition
- Author: Carl Sandburg
- Language: English
- Genre: Poetry
- Published: 1916 (Henry Holt)
- Media type: Print

Chicago Poems is a 1916 collection of poetry by Carl Sandburg, his first by a mainstream publisher.

== Inspiration, publication, and reception ==
Sandburg moved to Chicago in 1912 after living in Milwaukee, where he had served as secretary to Emil Seidel, Milwaukee's Socialist mayor. Harriet Monroe, a fellow resident of Chicago, had recently founded the magazine Poetry at around this time. Monroe liked and encouraged Sandburg's plain-speaking free verse style, strongly reminiscent of Walt Whitman.

Sandburg sent his manuscript to Alfred Harcourt, then a junior-ranking editor at Henry Holt. Facing opposition from above, Harcourt removed and censored—with Sandburg's co-operation—the harsher poems. For example, the direct criticism of "Billy Sunday" by name, previously published in The Masses and International Socialist Review, was replaced with the more tepid and anonymous "To a Contemporary Bunkshooter".

Chicago Poems established Sandburg as a major figure in contemporary literature. Chicago Poems, and its follow-up volumes of verse, Cornhuskers (1918) and Smoke and Steel (1920) represent Sandburg's attempts to found an American version of social realism, writing expansive verse in praise of American agriculture and industry.

== Poems included ==
- "Chicago"
- "Fog"
- "Happiness"
