= The World of Carl Sandburg =

1961 book by Carl Sandburg

- Bette Davis and Gary Merrill
- Author: Norman Corwin
- Cover artist: John Engstead
- Published: 1961 (Harcourt, Brace & World)
- Media type: Print (Hardback)
- Pages: 113

The World of Carl Sandburg was a stage presentation of selections from the poetry and prose of Carl Sandburg, chosen and arranged by Norman Corwin, starring Bette Davis. There was a 21-week national tour 1959–1960, co-starring Davis's husband Gary Merrill, towards the end, he was replaced by Barry Sullivan. Afterwards, there was a one-month run at the Henry Miller Theatre in the fall of 1960, co-starring Leif Erickson. Guitar accompaniment and singing was provided by the folk singer and guitarist Clark Allen.

For the opening performances, both of the tour and on Broadway, Sandburg himself spoke after the production.

A printed text version, with commentary by Corwin and Sandburg, was then published in 1961.

== Norman Corwin background ==
Since the 1930s, Corwin had been adapting Sandburg for the stage in various ways. In 1958, he was approached by Leonard Karzmar to create a production honoring Sandburg in his 80th year. The result was a Hollywood star-studded evening held on the campus of UCLA.

When, a few months later, Corwin was asked for "suggestions for an evening of 'concert style' theater", he chose the Sandburg Tribute as a model, but reworked it for three performers.

== Bette Davis background ==
In the late 1950s, Davis's career as a celebrated Hollywood actress was seemingly over, with several failures in a row. She had even agreed to a television role, but the pilot was not even aired. Davis was considering a return to live theater when she was approached for the Sandburg staging, and she and her husband, Gary Merrill, signed on without a script.

As Davis and Merrill lived in Maine, rehearsals were held at Bowdoin College, and the show premiered in Portland.

Their marriage was falling apart at the time, and the national tour accelerated their personal acrimony.

Davis and Merrill, during the tour, ended up staying in widely separated rooms. Davis served Merrill with divorce papers during the tour, and Barry Sullivan substituted for Merrill.

== On Broadway ==
The Broadway production, with Leif Erickson, received four favorable reviews out of seven in the New York papers. Overall, the show was a failure, and closed after one month. Corwin lists numerous excuses, none of which he believes, while he barely hints at what several Davis biographers state explicitly: the Davis-Merrill on-stage chemistry had been a major draw.
