= Remembrance Rock =

1948 historical novel by American poet Carl Sandburg

- Cover of the first trade edition
- Author: Carl Sandburg
- Cover artist: Paul Sample
- Language: English
- Genre: Historical epic
- Published: 1948 (Harcourt, Brace and Company)
- Media type: Print (clothbound hardcover)
- Pages: 1067

Remembrance Rock is Carl Sandburg's only novel. Sandburg described it as

an epic, weaving the mystery of the American Dream with the costly toil and bloody struggles that gone to keep alive and carry further that Dream.

Remembrance Rock was first published in a limited deluxe edition of 1000 copies (signed, numbered, two volumes), then published in a one volume trade edition.

== Origins ==
Metro-Goldwyn-Mayer had announced, in 1941, a film American Cavalcade that was to star Spencer Tracy and Katharine Hepburn, playing husband-and-wife teams from different periods of American history. The original treatment was rejected, and in 1943, the studio arranged with Sandburg to use the idea and then pre-purchased the film rights.

In his review, Perry Miller noted the novel's cast of characters essentially repeated themselves through time, and stated that as a result, the novel read like a "supercolossal script" meant for the same actors to play identical roles in different period costumes. Miller found it "disheartening" that Sandburg would try such a thing, unaware that this was a deliberate arrangement with Hollywood.

== Personal significance ==
Carl Sandburg, his wife, and two daughters had their ashes buried under "Remembrance Rock", the 5-foot granite boulder whose name was the source for the novel's title, in the backyard of Sandburg's birthplace and boyhood home.

== Organization ==
The novel tells a plethora of stories taken from American history, involving essentially the same characters recast through the centuries. They are easily identified because their initials never change.

The opening and ending frame story is set during World War II. It begins with a retired Supreme Court Justice, Orville Brand Windom, preparing and giving a radio speech, broadcast nationally and overseas, on patriotism and war and U.S. history. He has made a little legacy of leaving handfuls of earth and dust, taken from Plymouth, Valley Forge, Cemetery Ridge and Argonne, at "Remembrance Rock", a large Washington, D.C. garden boulder by his house. He dies soon after, and leaves a request to his children and grandchildren that they read the three manuscripts he has prepared.

These three manuscripts are the bulk of the novel. The first involves the Pilgrims and Plymouth Rock, the second is set during the Revolution, and the third is set during the Civil War.

The main woman is named Mary Windling, Mim Wilming, Mibs Wimbler, and Mimah, respectively. The young warrior who has to choose between the girl and the cause yet ends up with both is Resolved Wayfare, Robert Winshore, Rodney Wayman, and his grandson Raymond, respectively. The avuncular storyteller is named Oliber Ball Windrow, Orton Wingate, Ordway Winshore, and Omri Wonwold, respectively, but also Justice Orville Brand Windom.

After the three manuscripts, the novel returns to World War II. Windom's speech has affected and inspired many soldiers overseas, inspiring the burial of more earth, dust, and sand, taken from Utah beach, the South Pacific, Sicily, and Okinawa, under Remembrance Rock.

== Reception ==
It is no great shakes as a novel and quite a great shakes as a book on the American destiny. Its faults and its excellences are all on what you might call a quietly stupendous scale... In the end, of course, he succeeds only in saying in half a million words or so what Lincoln suggested in the last sentence of the Gettysburg Address. But that's enough, isn't it?

— Charles Poore, The New York Times, 7 October 1948

[It] is not really a novel; it is the chant of an antique Bard who fills out the beat with stereotypes and repetitions.

— Perry Miller, The New York Times Book Review, 10 October 1948

[Sandburg] has given scope and body and direction to the American dream as only a great poet, patriot and liberal of first-rate talent could hope to do. For all these he should be highly praised and awarded the Pulitzer Prize. ... it is ... unfortunate ... this book is called a novel, since its major values are political, poetical, and historical.

— Sterling North, The Washington Post, 17 October 1948
