= Abraham Lincoln: The War Years =

Volumes 3–6 of Sanburg's Lincoln

- First editions
- Author: Carl Sandburg
- Language: English
- Genre: Non-fiction
- Publisher: Harcourt Brace
- Publication date: 1939
- Publication place: United States

Abraham Lincoln: The War Years encompasses volumes three through six of Carl Sandburg's six-volume biography of Abraham Lincoln; these volumes focus particularly on the American Civil War period. The first two volumes, Abraham Lincoln: The Prairie Years, were published in 1926 and cover the period from Lincoln's birth through his inauguration as president. The final four volumes were published together in 1939, and won the 1940 Pulitzer Prize for History.

Abraham Lincoln: The Prairie Years and Abraham Lincoln: The War Years are collectively considered by many to be "the best-selling, most widely read, and most influential book[s] about Lincoln." The books have been through many editions, including a one-volume edition in 1954 prepared by Sandburg.

Sandburg's Lincoln scholarship, primarily in these volumes, had an enormous impact on the popular view of Lincoln. The books were adapted by Robert Sherwood for his Pulitzer Prize-winning play, Abe Lincoln in Illinois (1938) and David Wolper's six-part dramatization for television, Sandburg's Lincoln (1974), starring Hal Holbrook as the president. Sandburg recorded excerpts from the biography and some of Lincoln's speeches for Caedmon Records in New York City in May 1957. He was awarded a Grammy Award in 1959 for Best Performance – Documentary Or Spoken Word (Other Than Comedy) for his recording of Aaron Copland's Lincoln Portrait with the New York Philharmonic. Some historians suggest more Americans learned about Lincoln from Sandburg than from any other source.

The books garnered critical praise and attention for Sandburg, including the 1940 Pulitzer Prize for History for the four-volume The War Years. But Sandburg's works on Lincoln also brought substantial criticism. William Eleazar Barton, who had published a Lincoln biography in 1925, wrote that Sandburg's book "is not history, is not even biography" because of its lack of original research and uncritical use of evidence, but Barton nevertheless thought it was "real literature and a delightful and important contribution to the ever-lengthening shelf of really good books about Lincoln." Historian Milo Milton Quaife criticized Sandburg for not documenting his sources and questioned the accuracy of The Prairie Years, noting they contain a number of factual errors. Others have complained The Prairie Years and The War Years contain too much material that is neither biography nor history, saying the books are instead "sentimental poeticizing" by Sandburg. Sandburg himself may have viewed his works more as an American epic than as a mere biography, a view also mirrored by other reviewers.
