= Sunrise Mall (Corpus Christi) =

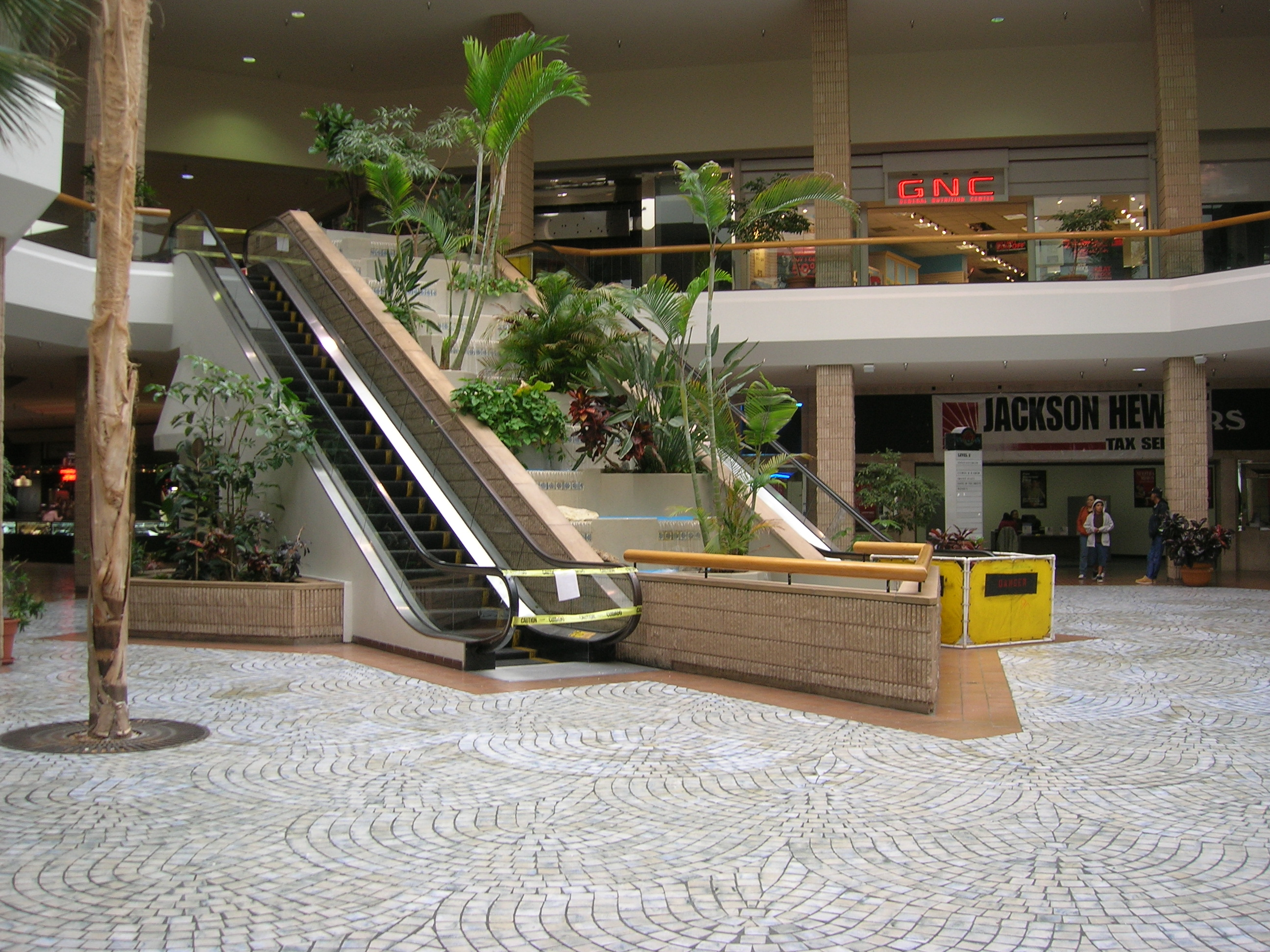
- Sunrise Mall in January 2009
- Location: Corpus Christi, Texas, United States
- Coordinates: 27.70763°N 97.36587°W
- Address: 5858 South Padre Island Drive
- Opened: February 4, 1981
- Closed: August 11, 2019
- Demolished: August 9, 2024
- Developer: Jim Wilson and Associates
- Manager: Sunrise LP
- Owner: Mo-Pat Sunrise Mall, LLC.
- Num. of anchor tenants: 6 (5 open, 1 vacant)
- Floor area: 930,538 square feet (86,449.8 m^{2})
- Floors: 2
- Parking: 2,500est
- Website: https://web.archive.org/web/20010401014335/http://www.sunrise-mall.net/

Sunrise Mall was a two-story, enclosed shopping mall in Corpus Christi, Texas. It closed in 2019 and demolition began in 2024.

== History ==
=== Early years and prosperity (1979–1987) ===
With construction crews breaking ground on November 1, 1979, Sunrise Mall was built over a 15-month period in the early 1980s on property less than 1,000 feet from the existing Padre Staples Mall. Grand opening ceremonies were held on February 4, 1981, with Joske's, Frost Bros., Sears, and H-E-B as the mall's primary anchors, the latter two which predated the mall the decade prior. In its early years, the mall competed well against nearby Padre Staples Mall. Despite its close proximity to a competing mall, most retailers chose to locate duplicate locations within the new mall rather than close their existing ones. The mall flourished during the early 1980s, earning minor fame as a filming location for the film The Legend of Billie Jean.

In response to a renovation and expansion of Padre Staples Mall, management began a major expansion and renovation in 1987 which was to add a new anchor store, Mervyn's, a movie theater, a nautical-themed food court, and two parking garages. In the midst of their renovations, however, Sunrise was dealt a blow when Joske's was purchased by Dillard's. Already having a location at Padre Staples Mall, Dillard's management chose to close the Sunrise Mall location, leaving Sunrise with one of their major anchor stores vacant. Montgomery Ward, however, stepped in and took over the location in November of the same year.

=== Gradual downfall (1988–2007) ===
In April 1988, just two months after completing renovations, Frost Bros. announced that they were closing their Corpus Christi location due to financial difficulties. Problems began to beset the retailers at Sunrise almost immediately. Many retailers were already finding it difficult to justify operating two stores within such proximity to one another. Gradually, major retailers began to migrate back to Padre Staples Mall. In 1990, the now closed H-E-B store was connected to the mall by a corridor and re-opened as Stein Mart.

After more than four years, the Frost Bros. location was taken over in 1992 by Burlington Coat Factory, a retailer not normally associated with being a major mall anchor. Despite this, major retailers continued to leave the mall. The collapse of Montgomery Ward in 2000 along with the closing of Mervyn's in 2006 left Sunrise with two major anchor spaces vacant. A series of ownership and management changes left the mall mostly vacant by 2007, leaving a few non-traditional mall tenants such as an insurance agency, an unemployment office, and a medical clinic. Wilcox Furniture, a local chain, opened in late 2007, occupying a portion of the previous Montgomery Ward anchor store.

=== Rapid decline (2008–2019) ===
The mall fell into serious neglect in early 2008, including an incident in which the power was cut off by Reliant Energy due to the owner failing to pay the facility's electricity bill. After a brief legal battle and a bankruptcy filing, the mall was foreclosed upon in September 2008, but was still open and running with few businesses open.

In November 2018, news stations reported that more tenants were told to leave by the end of the month. It was unknown if the mall would close, leaving the major tenants who own their property open.

On August 31, 2019, it was announced that Sears would be closing this location a part of a plan to close 92 stores nationwide. The store closed in December 2019.

== Sunrise Mall today ==
=== New ownership and revitalization attempt ===
Sunrise Mall was purchased at a foreclosure auction by Laredo, Texas-based IBC Bank, the mall's largest creditor, in September 2008. A new management team was brought in to revitalize the facility and to market the mall to new tenants. Many improvements had been made, including a new air conditioning system and a professional security staff. Notably, the fountains, which were prominently featured in the film The Legend of Billie Jean, had been restored to working condition after years of being inoperable. The bank sold the mall on November 3, 2016. The current owner of the mall, according to the Nueces County Appraisal District, is Mo-Pat Sunrise Mall, LLC.

Anchor tenant Sears closed in December 2019. Wilcox Furniture announced their closure in March 2021, while Burlington announced that their store would close and relocate to the nearby Moore Plaza shopping center in fall 2021.

=== Decline and eventual closure ===
By June 2018, the mall had become nearly dead, albeit clean and well-maintained, but housing very few active businesses. The mall's escalators were shut down, leaving only a few elevators and staircases to help people to the second floor. The upstairs food court had been reduced to one open restaurant.

Among the major attractions that remained were Burlington, arcade, mini-golf, two gyms, and bridal stores. By January 15, 2018 the Cinemark Dollar Cinema had ceased operation.

The mall officially closed its mall portion to the public on August 11, 2019, with many of the remaining tenants inside the building following suit.

On October 3, 2022, the owners of the mall filed for Chapter 11 bankruptcy.

=== Demolition ===
Demolition of Sunrise Mall began on August 8, 2024. While the process was initially expected to be completed by November 2024, as of June 6, 2025, demolition is still ongoing. Plans for the site include the construction of two restaurants and either a hotel or an apartment complex. The two existing parking garages will remain in place. Several businesses from the original mall—Freedom Fitness, Bel Furniture, Eddie's Tavern, Odyssey Early Learning, Midnight Rodeo, and Safe Space Storage—will also remain.
