= Joseffy =

Stage magician in the 1900s

- Frontispiece, "The Marvelous Creations of Joseffy" (1908)
- Born: Josef P. Freud; 3 March 1873; Vienna, Austria
- Died: 26 May 1946 (aged 73); San Antonio, Texas
- Occupation: magician
- Known for: magic

Josef P. Freud (also known as Joseffy) (3 March 1873 – 26 May 1946) was a Viennese magician.

== Life ==
Joseffy came to the United States of America at the age of 19 where he worked at a Chicago Magic Store, building props and illusions. He invented a self-contained, no-thread version of The Rising Cards that astounded magicians of his day. One of his mechanical creations was "Balsamo, the Living Skull".

Joseffy was a performer at Coney Island as the Chautauqua & Lyceum headliner, and also played violin. He eventually stopped performing and became an electrical engineer.

== Literature ==
- The Marvelous Creations of Joseffy by David Abbott (1908)
- Joseffy by Carl Sandburg (1910)

== See also ==
- List of magicians
- Card magic
