= Carl Sandburg =

American writer and editor (1878–1967)

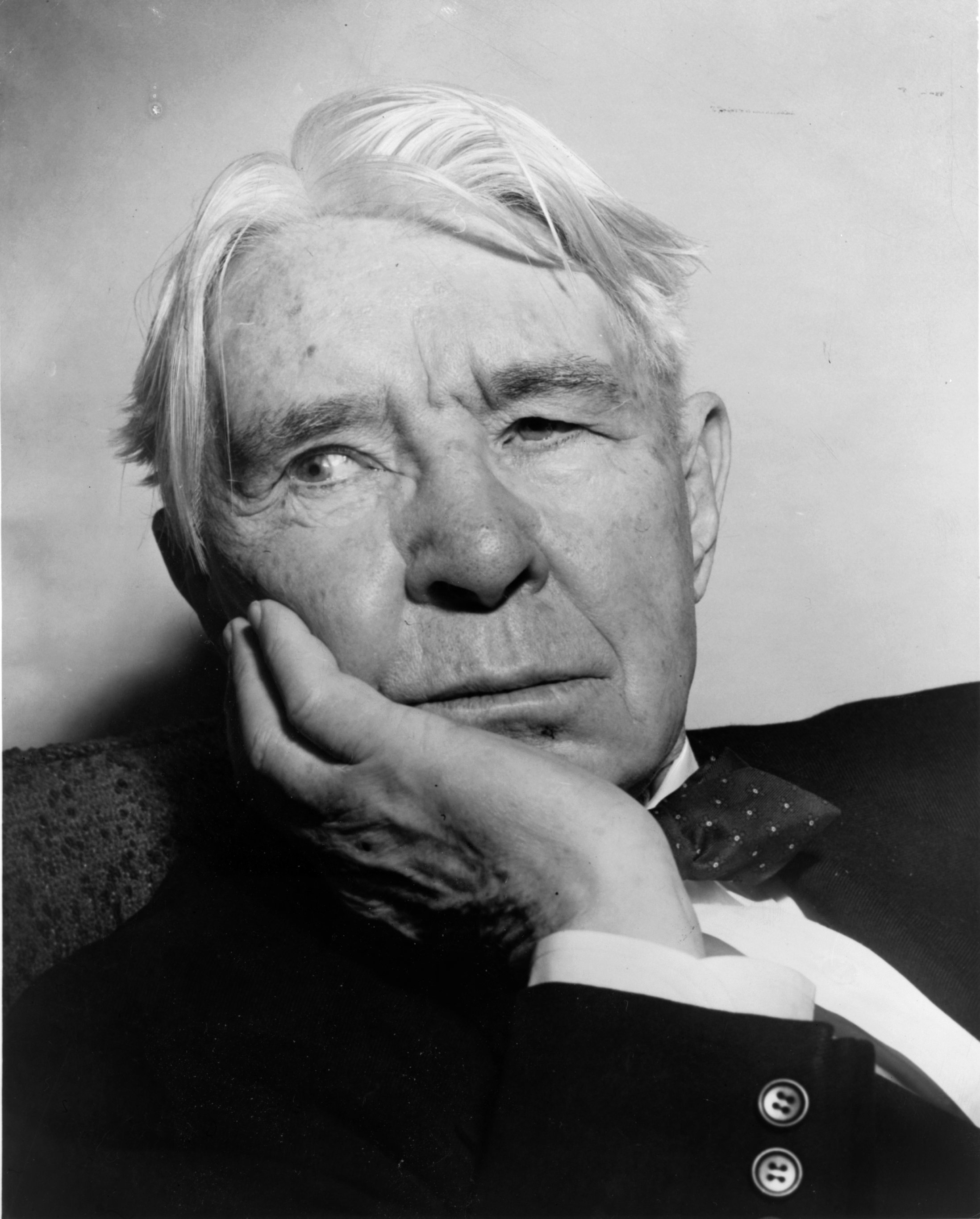
- Sandburg in 1955
- Born: Carl Sandberg; January 6, 1878; Galesburg, Illinois, U.S.
- Died: July 22, 1967 (aged 89); Flat Rock, North Carolina, U.S.
- Education: Lombard College (non-graduate)
- Occupations: Journalist, author, and editor
- Spouse: Lilian Steichen (m. 1908)
- Children: 3
- Relatives: Edward Steichen (brother-in-law); George Crile Jr. (son-in-law); Mary Calderone (niece)
- Writing career
- Notable works: Chicago Poems; The People, Yes; Abraham Lincoln: The Prairie Years and The War Years; Rootabaga Stories
- Notable awards: Pulitzer Prize (1919, 1940, 1951); Robert Frost Medal (1952); Presidential Medal of Freedom (1964)
- Military Service
- Allegiance: United States
- Branch: U.S. Army
- Service years: 1898
- Rank: Private
- Unit: 6th Illinois Infantry
- Conflicts: Spanish–American War • Puerto Rico

Signature
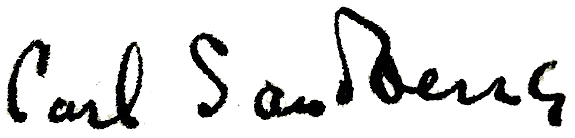

Carl August Sandburg (January 6, 1878– July 22, 1967) was an American poet, biographer, journalist, and editor. He won three Pulitzer Prizes: two for his poetry and one for his biography of Abraham Lincoln. During his lifetime Sandburg was widely regarded as "a major figure in contemporary literature", especially for volumes of his collected verse, including Chicago Poems (1916), Cornhuskers (1918), and Smoke and Steel (1920). He enjoyed "unrivaled appeal as a poet in his day, perhaps because the breadth of his experiences connected him with so many strands of American life". When he died in 1967, President Lyndon B. Johnson observed that "Carl Sandburg was more than the voice of America, more than the poet of its strength and genius. He was America."

== Life ==
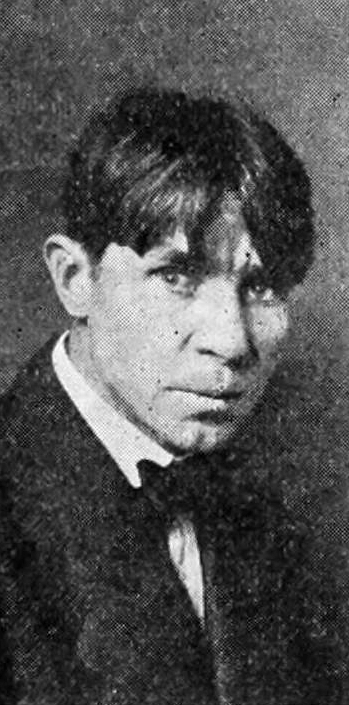
Sandburg c. 1914

Carl Sandburg was born in a three-room cottage at 313 East Third Street in Galesburg, Illinois, to Clara Mathilda (née Anderson) and August Sandberg, both of Swedish ancestry. He adopted the nickname "Charles" or “Charlie” in elementary school and, along with his two oldest siblings, changed the spelling of the family name to "Sandburg".

At the age of thirteen Sandburg left school and began driving a milk wagon. Between approximately ages fourteen and seventeen or eighteen he worked as a porter at the Union Hotel barbershop in Galesburg. He later returned to the milk route for eighteen months before working as a bricklayer and a farm laborer on the wheat plains of Kansas.

After a period at Lombard College in Galesburg Sandburg worked in various jobs, including as a hotel servant in Denver and a coal-heaver in Omaha, Nebraska. He began his writing career as a journalist for the Chicago Daily News and went on to write poetry, history, biographies, novels, children's literature, and film reviews. He also collected and edited books of ballads and folklore. Sandburg lived primarily in Illinois, Wisconsin, and Michigan before moving to North Carolina.

During the Spanish–American War Sandburg volunteered for military service and was stationed in Puerto Rico with the 6th Illinois Infantry, landing at Guánica on July 25, 1898, though he did not see combat. He attended the United States Military Academy in West Point, New York, for two weeks but left after failing mathematics and grammar examinations. He returned to Galesburg and entered Lombard College, leaving without a degree in 1903.

Sandburg subsequently moved to Milwaukee, Wisconsin, where he worked for a newspaper and joined the Wisconsin Social Democratic Party, affiliated with the Socialist Party of America. Sandburg served as secretary to Emil Seidel, Milwaukee's socialist mayor from 1910 to 1912. Sandburg later stated that his experiences in Milwaukee were formative for his life and work.

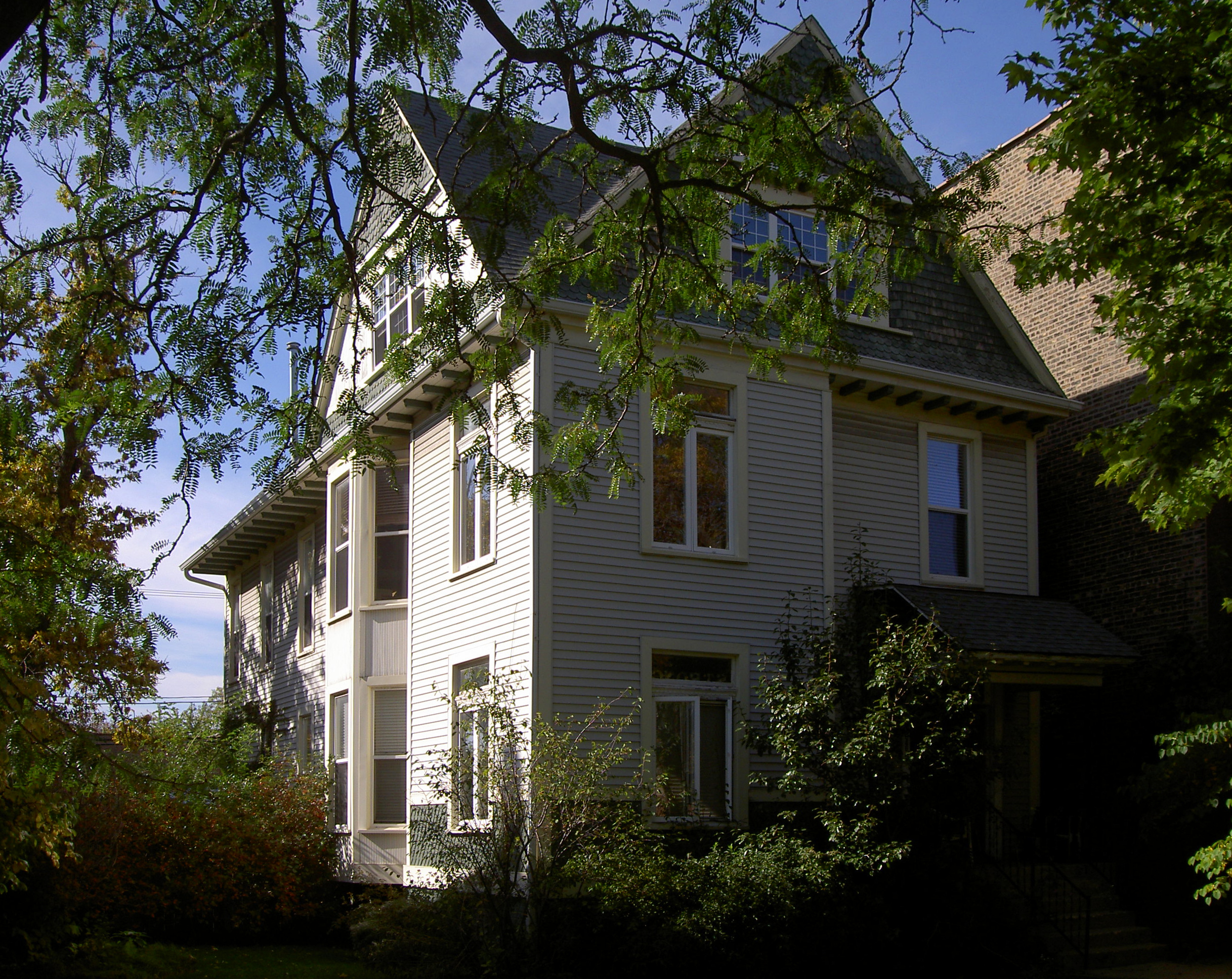
Sandburg's home in Ravenswood, Chicago, where he wrote "Chicago", designated a Chicago Landmark in 2005.

In 1907 Sandburg met Lilian Steichen (1883–1977), sister of photographer Edward Steichen, at the Milwaukee Social Democratic Party office. They married the following year and had three daughters. Their first daughter Margaret was born in 1911. The family later lived in Harbert, Michigan; the Ravenswood neighborhood of Chicago; and then in Maywood, Illinois. From 1919 to 1930 they resided at 331 South York Street in Elmhurst, Illinois.

During his years living in Chicago's western suburbs Sandburg published several major works, including Chicago Poems (1916), Cornhuskers (1918), and Smoke and Steel (1920). He received a Pulitzer Prize in 1919, funded by a special grant from the Poetry Society of America, for Cornhuskers. He also wrote three children's books—Rootabaga Stories (1922), Rootabaga Pigeons (1923), and Potato Face (1930)—as well as Abraham Lincoln: The Prairie Years (1926), The American Songbag (1927), and Good Morning, America (1928). The Elmhurst home was later demolished; the site is now a parking lot.

Sandburg moved to Michigan in 1930. In 1940 he won the Pulitzer Prize for History for Abraham Lincoln: The War Years, the four-volume sequel to The Prairie Years, and in 1951 received a second Pulitzer Prize for Poetry for Complete Poems. (Note: The Pulitzer Prize for Poetry was inaugurated in 1922 but the organization now considers the first winners to be three recipients of 1918 and 1919 special awards.) In 1945 he settled at Connemara, a 246-acre (100 ha) estate in Flat Rock, Henderson County, North Carolina, where he lived with his wife, daughters, and grandchildren and produced a substantial portion of his later writings.

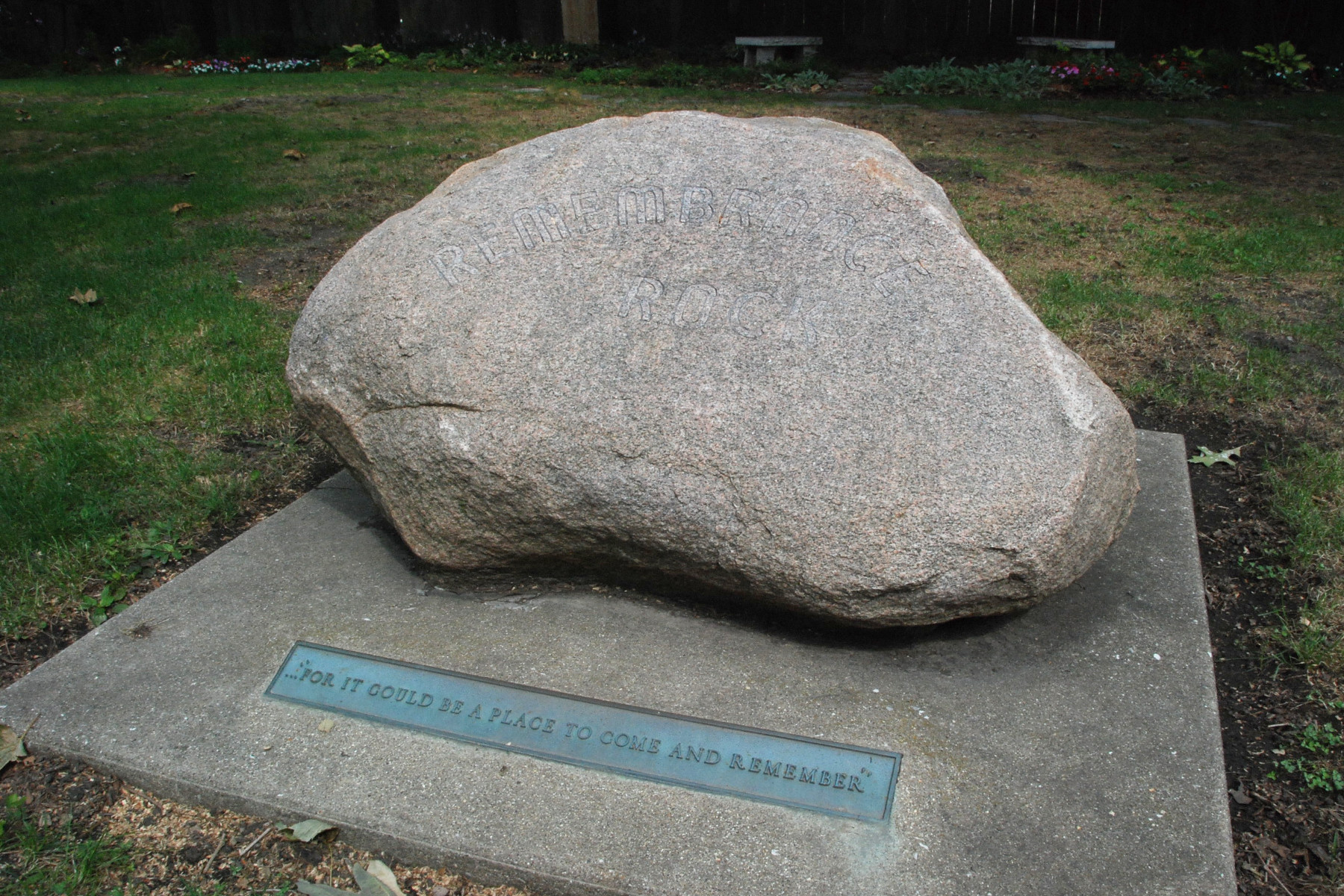
Remembrance Rock gravesite

On February 12, 1959, during the 150th anniversary of Abraham Lincoln’s birth, Sandburg delivered an address before a joint session of Congress following actor Fredric March’s reading of the Gettysburg Address. Sandburg supported the civil rights movement and received the NAACP Silver Plaque Award in recognition of his contributions to civil rights.

Sandburg died of natural causes in 1967 and his body was cremated. The ashes were interred under "Remembrance Rock", a granite boulder located behind his birth house in Galesburg. (Note: His wife and two daughters would also be interred there. See the signage.)

== Career ==
=== Poetry and prose ===
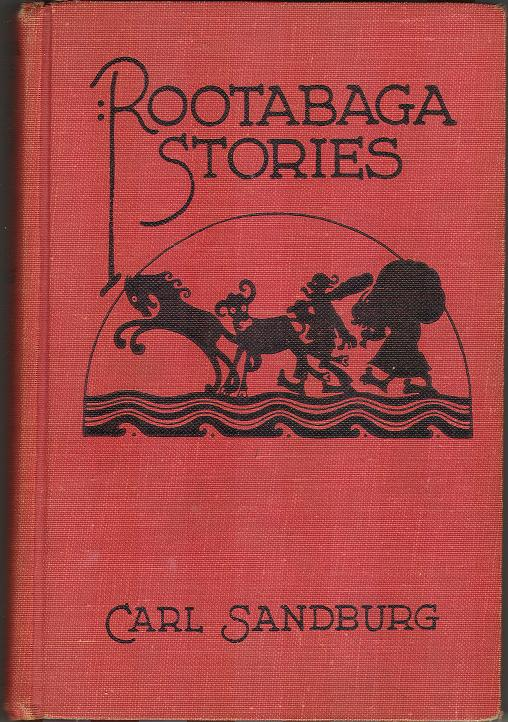
Rootabaga Stories (book 1, 1922)

Much of Carl Sandburg's poetry, such as "Chicago", focused on Chicago, Illinois, where he spent time as a reporter for the Chicago Daily News and The Day Book. His most famous description of the city is as "Hog Butcher for the World/Tool Maker, Stacker of Wheat/Player with Railroads and the Nation's Freight Handler,/Stormy, Husky, Brawling, City of the Big Shoulders."

Sandburg earned Pulitzer Prizes for his collection The Complete Poems of Carl Sandburg, Cornhuskers, and for his biography of Abraham Lincoln (Abraham Lincoln: The War Years). Sandburg is also remembered by generations of children for his Rootabaga Stories and Rootabaga Pigeons, a series of whimsical, sometimes melancholy stories he originally created for his own daughters. The Rootabaga Stories were born of Sandburg's desire for "American fairy tales" to match American childhood. He felt that the European stories involving royalty and knights were inappropriate, and so populated his stories with skyscrapers, trains, corn fairies and the "Five Marvelous Pretzels".

In 1919, Sandburg was assigned by his editor at the Daily News to do a series of reports on the working classes and tensions among whites and African Americans. The impetus for these reports were race riots that had broken out in other American cities. Ultimately, major riots broke out in Chicago too, but much of Sandburg's writing on the issues before the riots caused him to be seen as having a prophetic voice. A visiting philanthropist, Joel Spingarn, who was also an official of the National Association for the Advancement of Colored People, read Sandburg's columns with interest and asked to publish them, as The Chicago Race Riots, July, 1919.

=== Lincoln works ===
Sandburg's popular multivolume biography Abraham Lincoln: The Prairie Years, 2 vols. (1926) and Abraham Lincoln: The War Years, 4 vols. (1939) are collectively "the best-selling, most widely read, and most influential book[s] about Lincoln." The books have been through many editions, including a one-volume edition in 1954 prepared by Sandburg.

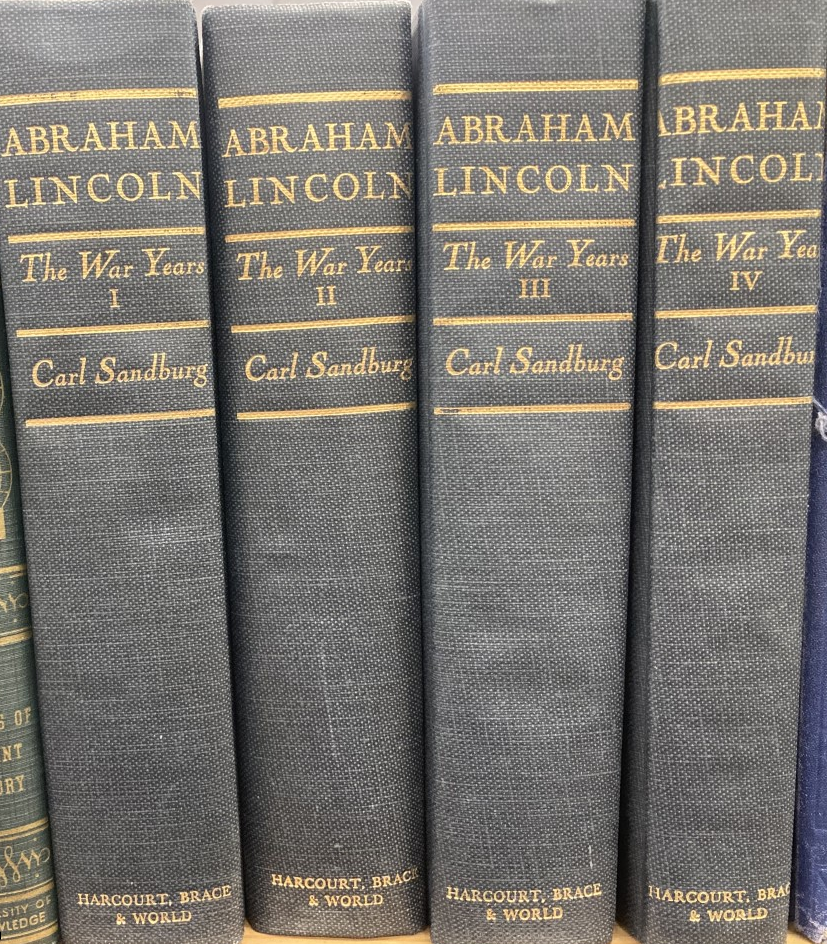
Sandburg's biography of Lincoln

Sandburg's Lincoln scholarship had an enormous impact on the popular view of Lincoln. The books were adapted by Robert E. Sherwood for his Pulitzer Prize-winning play, Abe Lincoln in Illinois (1938) and David Wolper's six-part dramatization for television, Sandburg's Lincoln (1974). He recorded excerpts from the biography and some of Lincoln's speeches for Caedmon Records in New York City in May 1957. He was awarded a Grammy Award in 1959 for Best Performance – Documentary Or Spoken Word (Other Than Comedy) for his recording of Aaron Copland's Lincoln Portrait with the New York Philharmonic. Some historians suggest more Americans learned about Lincoln from Sandburg than from any other source.

The books garnered critical praise and attention for Sandburg, including the 1940 Pulitzer Prize for History for the four-volume The War Years. But Sandburg's works on Lincoln also received substantial criticism. William E. Barton, who had published a Lincoln biography in 1925, wrote that Sandburg's book "is not history, is not even biography" because of its lack of original research and uncritical use of evidence, but Barton nevertheless thought it was "real literature and a delightful and important contribution to the ever-lengthening shelf of really good books about Lincoln." Historian Milo Milton Quaife criticized Sandburg for not documenting his sources and questioned the accuracy of The Prairie Years, noting they contain a number of factual errors. Others have complained The Prairie Years and The War Years contain too much material that is neither biography nor history, saying the books are instead "sentimental poeticizing" by Sandburg. Sandburg himself may have viewed his works more as an American epic than as a mere biography, a view also mirrored by other reviewers.

=== Folk music ===
Sandburg's 1927 anthology the American Songbag enjoyed enormous popularity, going through many editions, and Sandburg himself was perhaps the first American urban folk singer, accompanying himself on solo guitar at lectures and poetry recitals, and in recordings, long before the first or the second folk revival movements (of the 1940s and 1960s, respectively). According to the musicologist Judith Tick:

As a populist poet, Sandburg bestowed a powerful dignity on what the '20s called the "American scene" in a book he called a "ragbag of stripes and streaks of color from nearly all ends of the earth ... rich with the diversity of the United States." Reviewed widely in journals ranging from the New Masses to Modern Music, the American Songbag influenced a number of musicians. Pete Seeger, who calls it a "landmark", saw it "almost as soon as it came out." The composer Elie Siegmeister took it to Paris with him in 1927, and he and his wife Hannah "were always singing these songs. That was home. That was where we belonged."

=== Music Settings ===
The Song & the Slogan by Daniel Steven Crafts, commissioned by opera star Jerry Hadley.

Illinois Farmer by Daniel Steven Crafts, commissioned by opera star Jerry Hadley.

=== Film ===
Sandburg said he considered working on D. W. Griffith's Intolerance (1916), but his first film work was when he signed on to work on the production of The Greatest Story Ever Told (1965) in July 1960 for a year, receiving an "in creative association with Carl Sandburg" credit on the film.

== Legacy ==
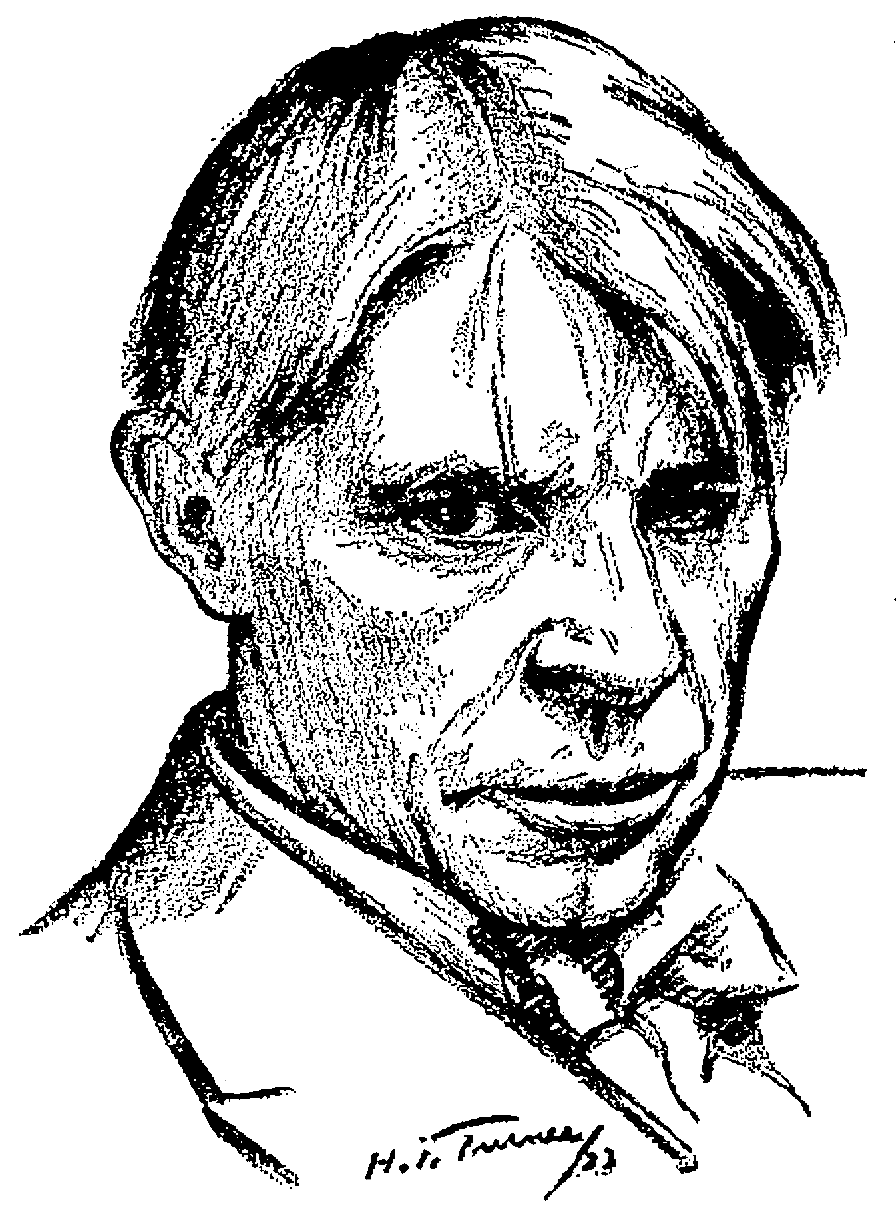
Portrait by H. J. Turner, 1923

=== Commemoration ===
Carl Sandburg's boyhood home in Galesburg is now operated by the Illinois Historic Preservation Agency as the Carl Sandburg State Historic Site. The site contains the cottage Sandburg was born in, a modern visitor center, and small garden with a large stone called Remembrance Rock, under which his and his wife's ashes are buried. Sandburg's home of 22 years in Flat Rock, Henderson County, North Carolina, is preserved by the National Park Service as the Carl Sandburg Home National Historic Site. Carl Sandburg College is located in Sandburg's birthplace of Galesburg, Illinois. Carl Sandburg High school is located in Orland park, Illinois. During the Spanish-American War, Sandburg was stationed at Camp Alger in Fairfax County, Virginia and so the county has both a Sandburg Road near the spot where the camp was located and a Carl Sandburg Middle School.

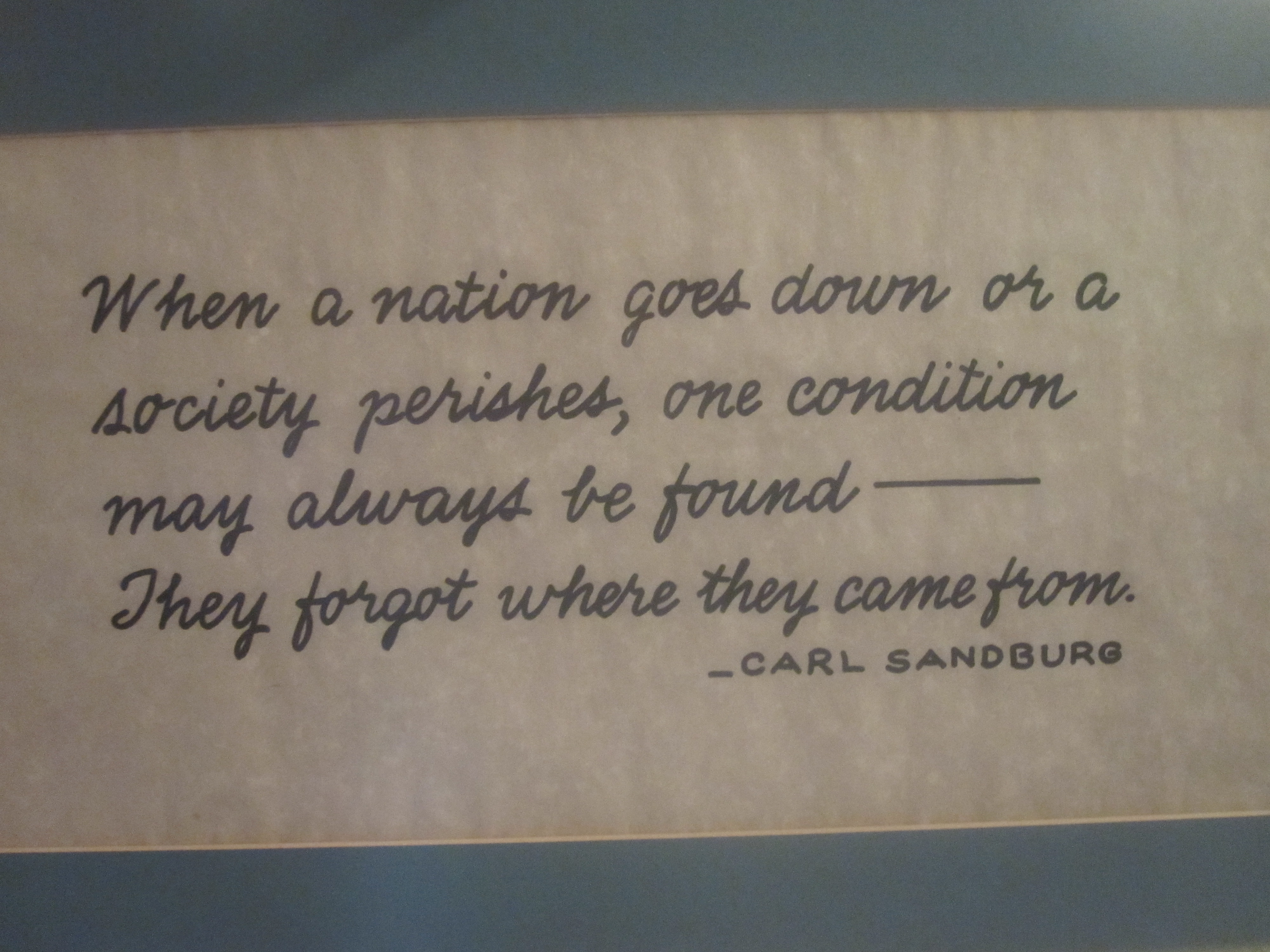
Sandburg on historical roots, displayed at Deaf Smith County Museum, Hereford, Texas

On January 6, 1978, the 100th anniversary of his birth, the United States Postal Service issued a commemorative stamp honoring Sandburg. The spare design consists of a profile originally drawn by his friend William A. Smith in 1952, along with Sandburg's own distinctive autograph.

The Rare Book & Manuscript Library (University of Illinois at Urbana-Champaign) (RBML) houses the Carl Sandburg Papers. The bulk of the collection was purchased directly from Carl Sandburg and his family. In total, the RBML owns over 600 cubic feet of Sandburg's papers, including photographs, correspondence, and manuscripts.

In 2011, Sandburg was inducted into the Chicago Literary Hall of Fame.

=== Namesakes ===
Carl Sandburg Village was a 1960s urban renewal project in the Near North Side, Chicago. Financed by the city, it is located between Clark and LaSalle St. between Division Street and North Ave. Solomon & Cordwell, architects. In 1979, Carl Sandburg Village was converted to condominium ownership.

Numerous schools are named for Sandburg throughout the United States, and he was present at some of these schools' dedications. (Some years after attending the 1954 dedication of Carl Sandburg High School in Orland Park, Illinois, Sandburg returned for an unannounced visit; the school's principal at first mistook him for a hobo.)Sandburg Halls, a student residence hall at the University of Wisconsin–Milwaukee, carries a plaque commemorating Sandburg's roles as an organizer for the Social Democratic Party and as personal secretary to Emil Seidel, Milwaukee's first Socialist mayor.

Carl Sandburg Library opened in Livonia, Michigan, in 1961. The name was recommended by the Library Commission as an example of an American author representing the best of literature of the Midwest. Carl Sandburg had taught at the University of Michigan for a time.

Galesburg opened Sandburg Mall in 1975, named in honor of Sandburg.

Amtrak added the Carl Sandburg train in 2006 to supplement the Illinois Zephyr on the Chicago–Quincy route.

Carl Sandburg Middle School in Alexandria, Virginia, part of Fairfax County Public Schools, was named in honor of Sandburg in 1985.

In 2000, the Chicago Public Library Foundation created the Carl Sandburg Literary Award, given annually to "an acclaimed author whose work has enhanced the public’s awareness of the written word."

== Politics ==
Carl Sandburg began his political involvement as an organizer for the Social Democratic Party of Wisconsin, affiliated with the Socialist Party of America, and served as secretary to Milwaukee's socialist mayor Emil Seidel from 1910 to 1912. Initially a committed socialist, he left the Socialist Party in 1917 due to disagreements with its opposition to U.S. participation in World War I, instead supporting President Woodrow Wilson's decision to enter the conflict.

Although Sandburg continued to hold some socialist sympathies—such as voting for Socialist Party candidate Eugene V. Debs in the 1920 United States presidential election—he later described himself as a "radical independent". During the 1920s, his political views moved to the right, and he developed a strong interest in Abraham Lincoln, whose life and leadership became central themes in his work. This interest culminated in his publication of Abraham Lincoln: The Prairie Years (1926) and Abraham Lincoln: The War Years (1939). His study of Lincoln reflected an increasing alignment with liberalism.

In the 1930s, Sandburg's political orientation shifted toward the Democratic Party. He supported President Franklin D. Roosevelt and the New Deal, drawing parallels between Roosevelt's policies and Lincoln's leadership during the Civil War. Sandburg publicly expressed his support for New Deal programs such as Social Security and federal employment initiatives through his writings and public appearances.

By the 1950s, Sandburg endorsed Democratic presidential candidate Adlai Stevenson II in the 1952 and 1956 presidential elections, participating in campaign activities and publicly commending Stevenson's platform. In 1960, he supported John F. Kennedy’s presidential campaign, speaking at rallies and expressing approval of Kennedy's New Frontier program, which he viewed as a continuation of Roosevelt’s legacy.

== In other media ==
- William Saroyan wrote a short story about Sandburg in his 1971 book Letters from 74 rue Taitbout or Don't Go But If You Must Say Hello To Everybody.
- Sandburg's "Sometime they'll give a war and nobody will come" from The People, Yes was a slogan of the German peace movement ("Stell dir vor, es ist Krieg, und keiner geht hin"); however, it is often falsely attributed to Bertolt Brecht.
- Daniel Steven Crafts' The Song and The Slogan is an orchestral composition built around recited passages from Sandburg's "Prairie".
- Peter Louis van Dijk's "Windy City Songs", based on the Chicago poems, was performed by the Chicago Children's Choir and the Nelson Mandela Metropolitan University Choir in 2007.
- Bob Gibson's "The Courtship of Carl Sandburg", starring Tom Amandes as Sandburg
- In Jonathan Lethem's novel Dissident Gardens the main character Rose Zimmer became an Abraham Lincoln devotee after reading Sandburg's biography. Her copy of the six volumes became the centerpiece of her shrine to Lincoln.
- Sufjan Stevens's "Come on! Feel the Illinoise! Part I: The World's Columbian Exposition Part II: Carl Sandburg Visits Me in a Dream" (from Illinois).
- Composer Phyllis Zimmerman set Sandburg's poems to music in her choral composition Fog, which was recorded and produced on CD.
- In 2016, composer and conductor Michael Tilson Thomas premiered his musical theater piece Four Preludes on Playthings of the Wind based on the Sandburg poem from the collection Smoke and Steel, for three singers, chamber orchestra and bar band.

== Bibliography ==
- In Reckless Ecstasy (1904) (poetry) (originally published as Charles Sandburg)
- Incidentals (1904) (poetry and prose) (originally published as Charles Sandburg)
- Plaint of a Rose (1908) (poetry) (originally published as Charles Sandburg)
- Joseffy (1910) (prose) (originally published as Charles Sandburg)
- You and Your Job (1910) (prose) (originally published as Charles Sandburg)
- Chicago Poems (1916) (poetry)
- Cornhuskers (1918) (poetry)
- Chicago Race Riots (1919) (prose) (with an introduction by Walter Lippmann)
- Clarence Darrow of Chicago (1919) (prose)
- Smoke and Steel (1920) (poetry)
- Rootabaga Stories (1922) (children's stories)
- Slabs of the Sunburnt West (1922) (poetry)
- Rootabaga Pigeons (1923) (children's stories)
- Selected Poems (1926) (poetry)
- Abraham Lincoln: The Prairie Years (1926) (biography)
- The American Songbag (1927) (folk songs)
- Songs of America (1927) (folk songs) (collected by Sandburg; edited by Alfred V. Frankenstein)
- Abe Lincoln Grows Up (1928) (biography [primarily for children])
- Good Morning, America (1928) (poetry)
- Steichen the Photographer (1929) (history)
- Early Moon (1930) (poetry)
- Potato Face (1930) (children's stories)
- Mary Lincoln: Wife and Widow (1932) (biography)
- The People, Yes (1936) (poetry)
- Abraham Lincoln: The War Years (1939) (biography)
- Storm over the Land (1942) (biography) (excerpts from Sandburg's own Abraham Lincoln: The War Years)
- Road to Victory (1942) (exhibition catalog) (text by Sandburg; images compiled by Edward Steichen and published by the Museum of Modern Art)
- Home Front Memo (1943) (essays)
- Remembrance Rock (1948) (novel)
- Lincoln Collector: the story of the Oliver R. Barrett Lincoln collection (1949) (prose)
- The New American Songbag (1950) (folk songs)
- Complete Poems (1950) (poetry)
- The Wedding Procession of the Rag Doll and the Broom Handle and Who Was In It (1950) (children's story)
- Always the Young Strangers (1953) (autobiography)
- Abraham Lincoln: The Prairie Years and the War Years (1954) (illustrated one-volume edition)
- Selected Poems of Carl Sandburg (1954) (poetry) (edited by Rebecca West)
- The Family of Man (1955) (exhibition catalog) (introduction; images compiled by Edward Steichen)
- Prairie-Town Boy (1955) (autobiography) (essentially excerpts from Always the Young Strangers)
- Sandburg Range (1957) (prose and poetry)
- Harvest Poems, 1910–1960 (1960) (poetry)
- Wind Song (1960) (poetry)
- The World of Carl Sandburg (1960) (stage production) (adapted and directed by Norman Corwin, dramatic readings by Bette Davis and Leif Erickson, singing and guitar by Clark Allen, with closing cameo by Sandburg himself)
- Carl Sandburg at Gettysburg (1961) (documentary)
- Honey and Salt (1963) (poetry)
- The Letters of Carl Sandburg (1968) (autobiographical/correspondence) (edited by Herbert Mitgang)
- Breathing Tokens (poetry by Sandburg, edited by Margaret Sandburg) (1978) (poetry)
- Ever the Winds of Chance (1983) (autobiography) (started by Sandburg, completed by Margaret Sandburg and George Hendrick)
- Carl Sandburg at the Movies: a poet in the silent era, 1920–1927 (1985) (selections of his reviews of silent movies; collected and edited by Dale Fetherling and Doug Fetherling)
- Billy Sunday and other poems (1993) (edited with an introduction by George Hendrick and Willene Hendrick)
- Poems for Children Nowhere Near Old Enough to Vote (1999) (compiled and with an introduction by George and Willene Hendrick)
- Poems for the People. (1999) 73 newfound poems from his early years in Chicago, edited with an introduction by George Hendrick and Willene Hendrick
- Abraham Lincoln: The Prairie Years and the War Years (2007) (illustrated edition with an introduction by Alan Axelrod)

== See also ==
- Carl Sandburg Home National Historic Site
