= North Carolina Highway 225 =

State highway in Henderson County, North Carolina, US

North Carolina Highway 225

Route information
- Maintained by NCDOT
- Length: 10.7 mi (17.2 km)
- Existed: 1997–present

Major junctions
- South end: US 25 near Tuxedo
- US 25 in Zirconia
- North end: US 176 / US 25 Bus. in Hendersonville

Location
- Country: United States
- State: North Carolina
- Counties: Henderson

Highway system
- North Carolina Highway System; Interstate; US; State; Scenic
← NC 222	→ NC 226

North Carolina Highway 225 (NC 225) is a 10.7-mile (17.2 km) route running from U.S. Route 25 (US 25), near the South Carolina state line to Hendersonville. It crosses over US 25 once before ending. It runs through East Flat Rock and near Lake Summit. The route is a prior alignment of US 25, designated after a new freeway was opened in stages from 1981–2003.

== Route description ==
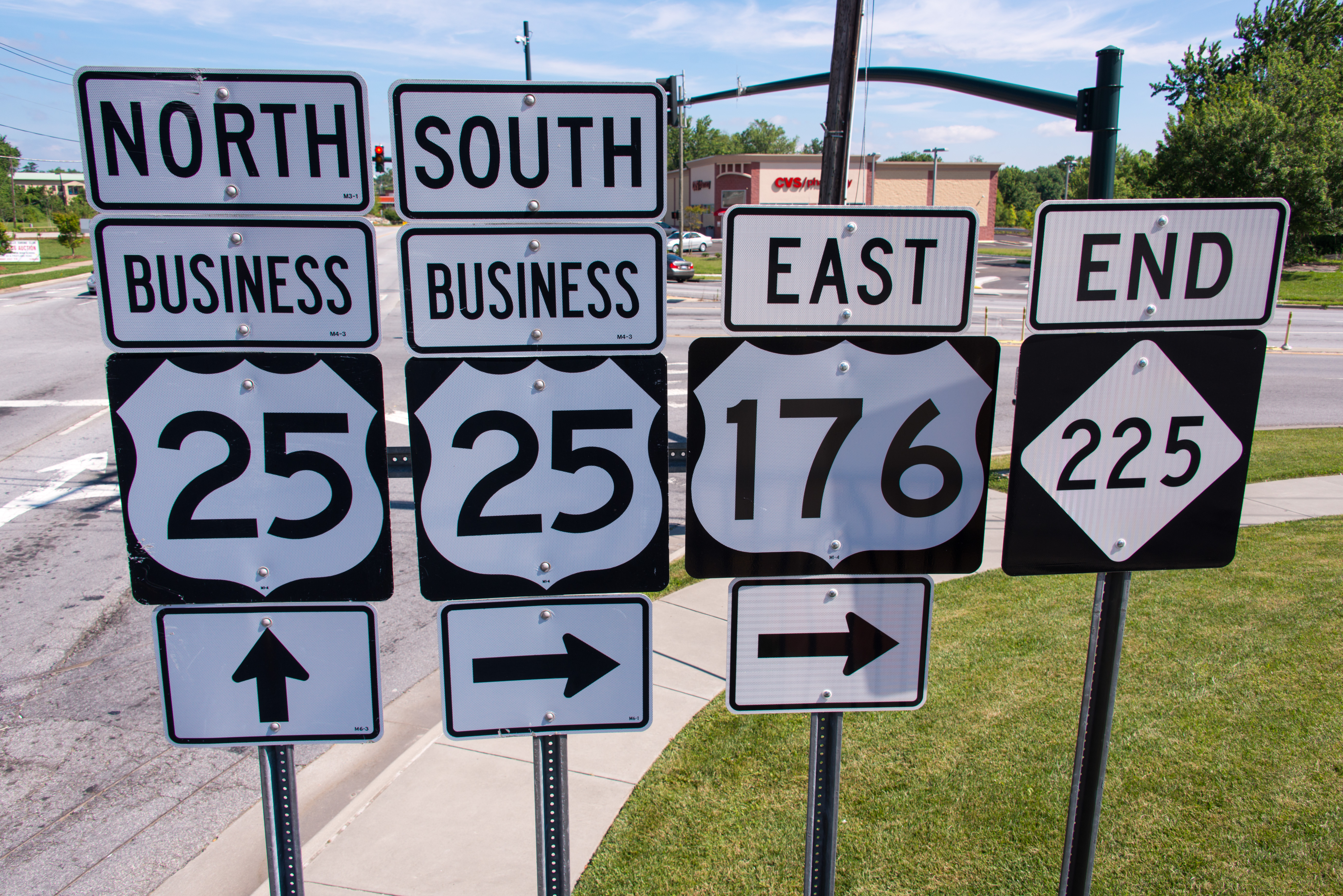
North end of NC 225 in Hendersonville

NC 225 is a two-lane rural highway that travels along a former routing of US 25 in Henderson County. Beginning along Bobs Creek Road and US 25 (exit 1), it goes east and then north along Old US Highway 25. Crossing the Green River, it enters the community of Tuxedo, wedged between US 25 and Lake Summit. At Zirconia, it crosses underneath US 25 (exit 5) continuing north through the village of Flat Rock. In Hendersonville, it ends at the intersection of South Main Street (US 25 Business) and Spartanburg Highway (US 176). This point also marks the western terminus for US 176.

With exception to Bobs Creek Road, NC 225 overlaps what was formally the Dixie Highway (1915-1927).

NC 225 is part of one scenic byway in the state (indicated by a Scenic Byways sign). Historic Flat Rock Scenic Byway is an 8.3-mile (13.4 km) byway from Pinnacle Mountain Road (SR 1114) to Highland Lake Road (SR 1783). It is noted for its views of nearby Glassy and McAlpin mountains and access to the Carl Sandburg Home National Historic Site, the Flat Rock Playhouse and the Flat Rock Historic District.

== History ==
Established in 1997, NC 225 follows the old US 25 alignment through Tuxedo, when US 25 was placed on new bypass route in 1981. At Zirconia, NC 225 traveled east as a new primary routing along a super two connector between US 25 and Interstate 26 (I-26). In 2003, and after expansion of the Super two into a four-lane freeway, US 25 was rerouted east of Zirconia towards I-26. As a result, NC 225 was rerouted along US 25 old alignment north of Zirconia to its current northern terminus at US 176/US 25 Business in Hendersonville.

== Junction list ==
The entire route is in Henderson County.

Location	mi	km	Destinations	Notes
	0.0– 0.1	0.0– 0.16	US 25 – Hendersonville, Greenville	Exit 1 (US 25)
Zirconia	4.5– 4.9	7.2– 7.9	US 25 – Hendersonville, Asheville, Greenville	Exit 5 (US 25)
Hendersonville	10.7	17.2	US 176 east (Spartanburg Highway) / US 25 Bus. (South Main Street) – Saluda	Western terminus of US 176
1.000 mi = 1.609 km; 1.000 km = 0.621 mi
