= John Jones-Govan King home =

John Jones-Govan King home is a historic log cabin originally built on King Road, Flat Rock, North Carolina around 1835 and currently resides on Highland Lake, in Flat Rock. The home is preserved with its original log walls and front door and is an example of log notching techniques.

== History ==
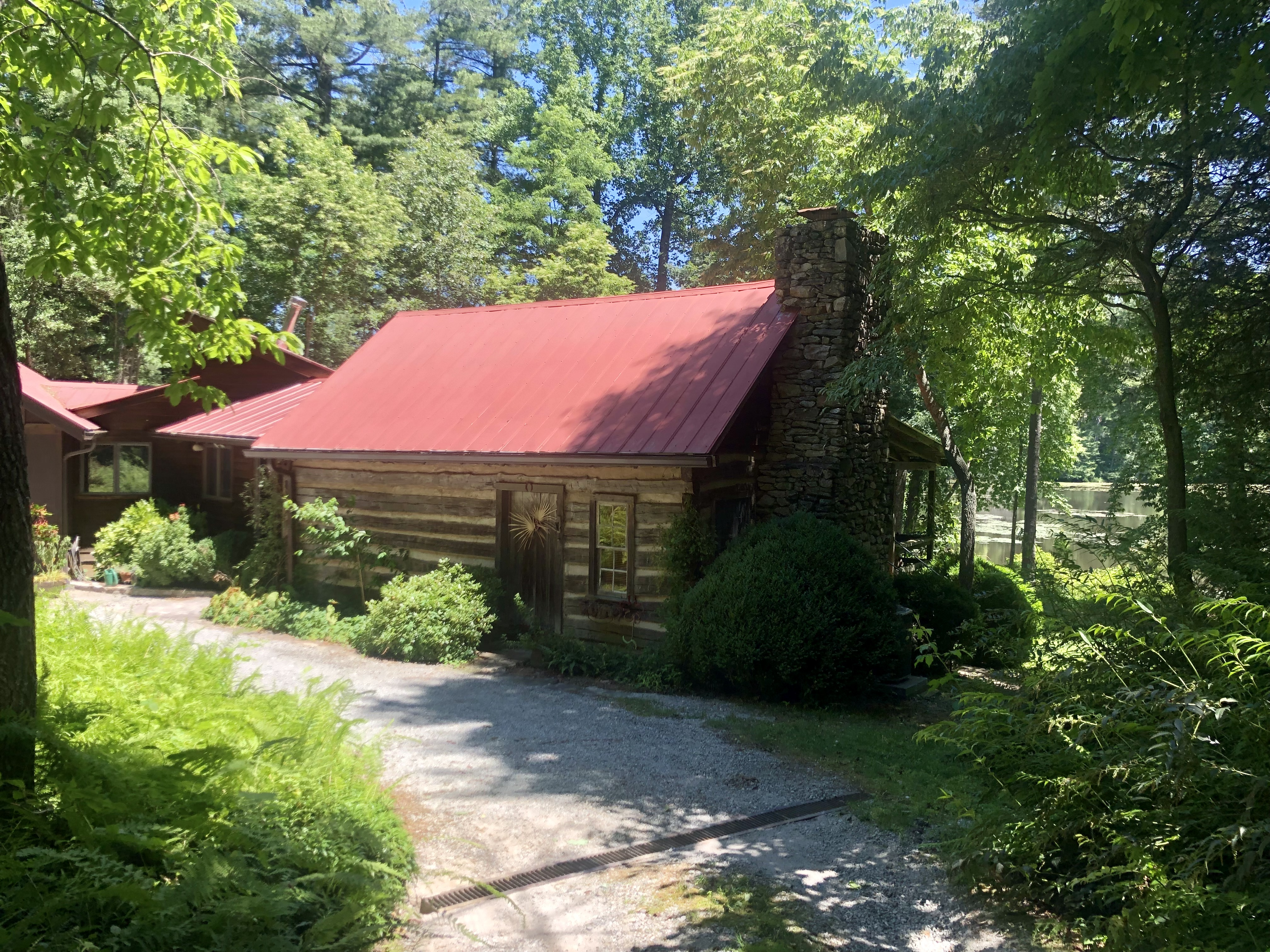
John Jones-Govan King House after relocation to Highland Lake in Flat Rock, NC

In its original location, the cabin was sturdy dwelling supported by logs of tulip trees and shingles of pine. A chimney of stone emerged from the center of its roof. It was built by John Jones (1815–1864) around 1835. John was a grandson of early settlers John Jones Sr. (1764–1860) and Mary Jane Hicks Jones (1767–1857). The younger Jones married Elizabeth Hamilton (1814–1894). Govan Thompson King (1879–1955) and Arminta Ellen Elizabeth Case King (1877–1960), farmers at Upward, were last to reside in the home.

In the 1970s, Dr. Lawrence and Elizabeth Lee moved the log house to their property alongside the western shore of Highland Lake in Flat Rock. The Lees had the chimney dismantled and then the single-pen structure lifted in one piece and moved on a flatbed truck. It was set on a new stone foundation with a new stone chimney and red standing seam metal roof. The original mud chink was replaced with mortar that was dyed "clay orange."

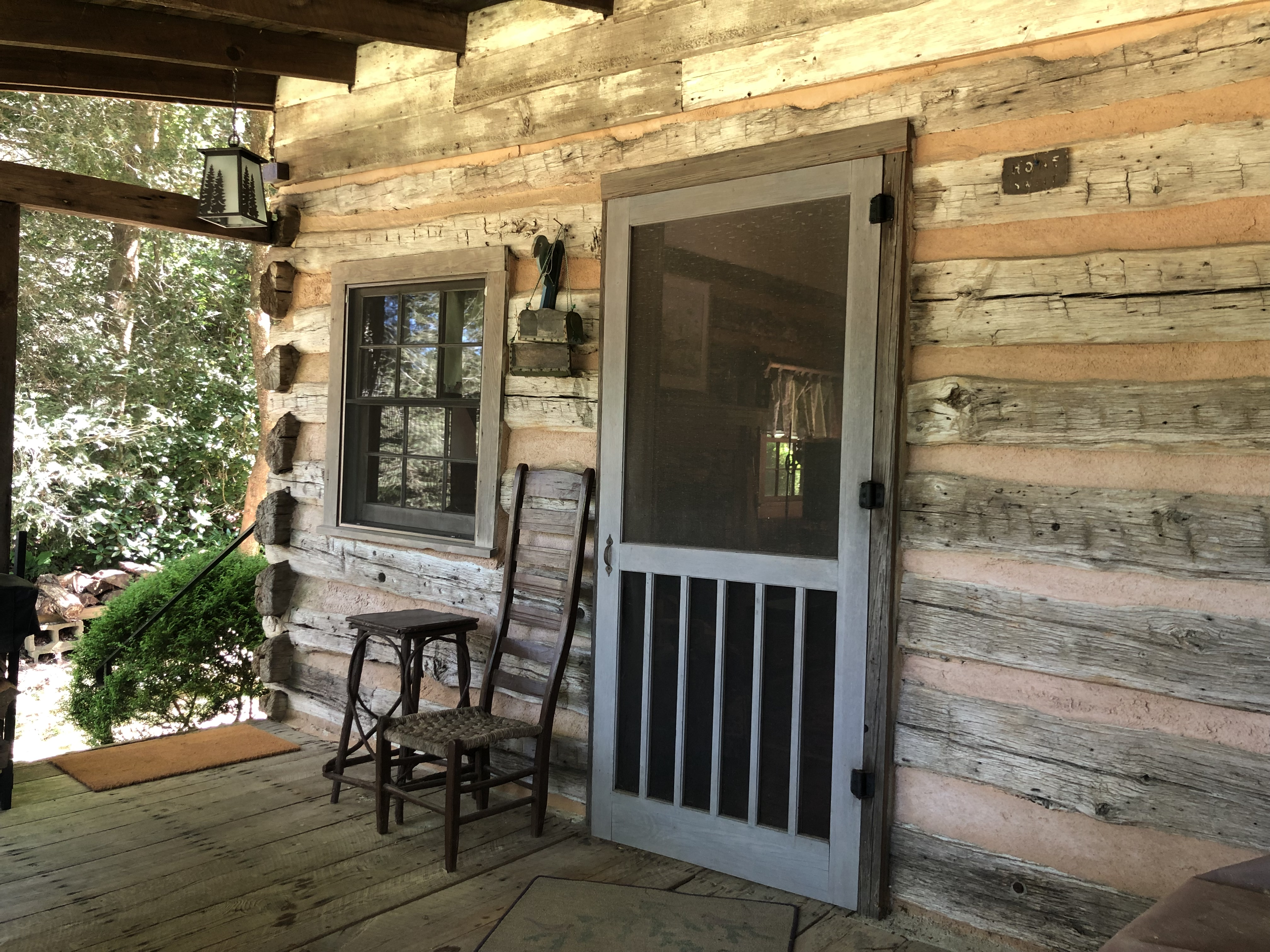
View of John Jones-Govan King House front Porch showing dove-tail notches in Tulip Poplar Logs

One of the doors features a bar-latch described by Frank L. FitzSimons after his visit to this home during the tenure of Mrs. Govan King. FitzSimons later told his publisher (Elizabeth Lee's brother) about the house, believing it should be saved. The Lees employed the restored and appended abode as a summer residence.
