= St. John in the Wilderness (Flat Rock, North Carolina) =

Historic church in North Carolina, United States

- U.S. Historic district – Contributing property
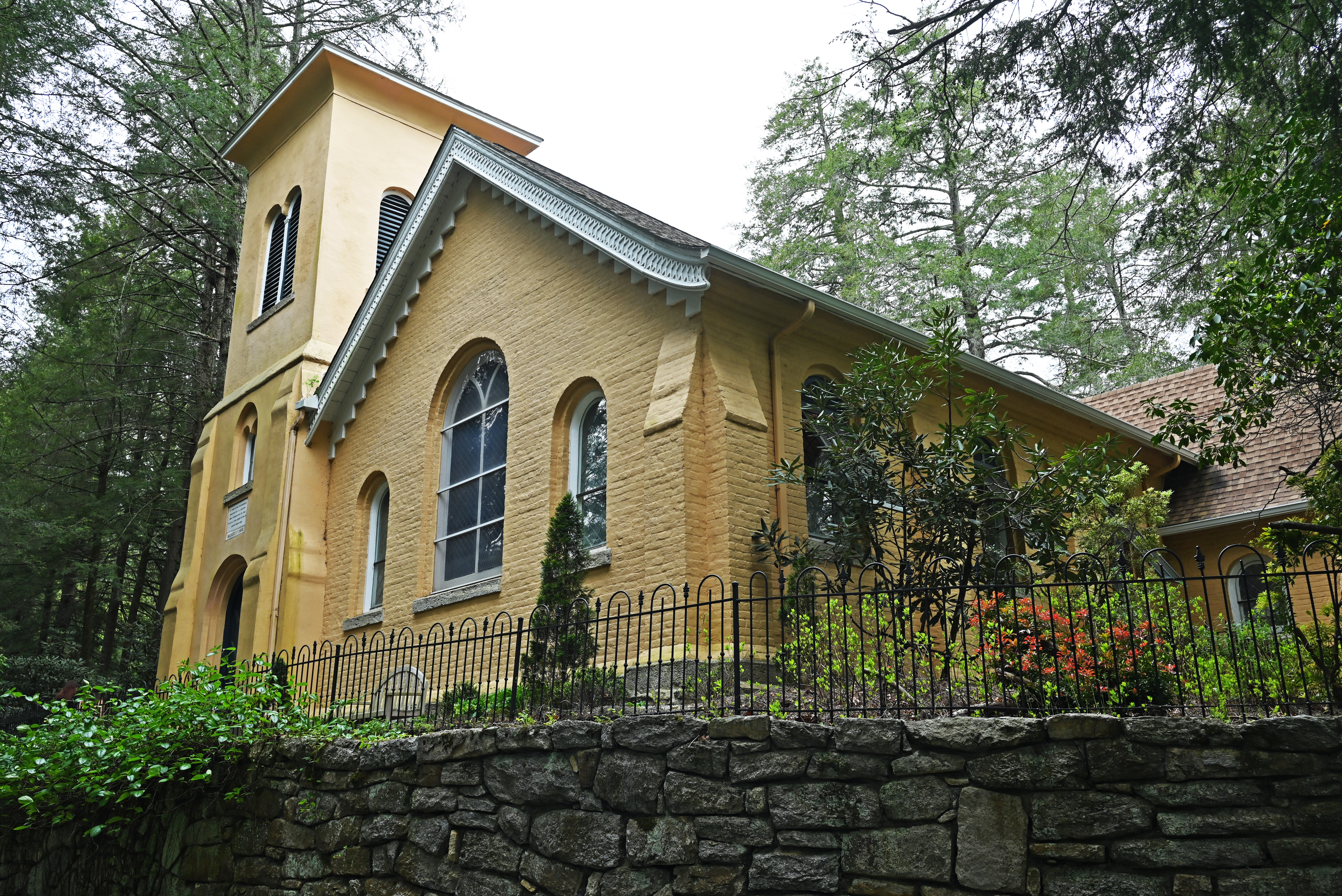
- St. John in the Wilderness in 1934

- Location within North Carolina Location within the United States
- Location: Flat Rock, North Carolina
- Coordinates: 35°16′56.8″N 82°26′34.2″W
- Part of: Flat Rock Historic District (ID73001352)

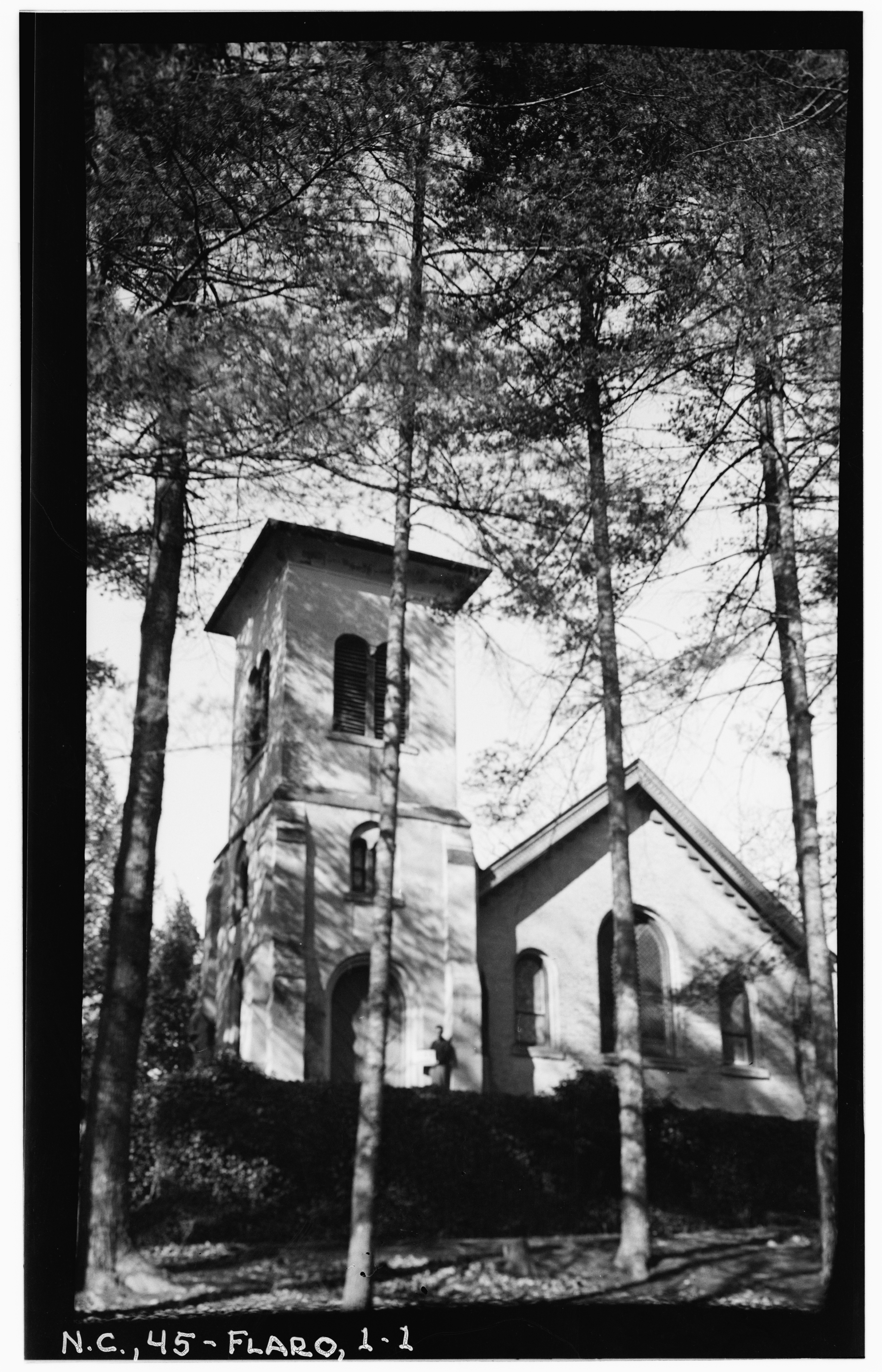
In 1934

St. John in the Wilderness (also known as St. John-in-the-Wilderness) is a historic church and cemetery in Flat Rock, North Carolina. It was the first Episcopal Church in Western North Carolina.

It was built in the 1850s and is a contributing structure to Flat Rock Historic District, which is on the National Register of Historic Places.

== History ==
It was consecrated by Bishop Levi Silliman Ives on August 28, 1836. Charles and Susan Baring, who considered Charleston, South Carolina too hot in the summer, were among the first settlers of Flat Rock in the 1820s. Other people moved from Charleston to Flat Rock, which Bishop Ives called a "new but interesting settlement" in 1837. The church started as a private chapel for the Barings, who later transferred the title to Bishop Ives and the Episcopal Diocese of North Carolina. Twenty members "formed themselves into a congregation".

St. John, named for John the Baptist, was unusual in that white people and slaves sat together in church. The first wedding performed in St. John's was between two slaves. Later, slaves and free blacks were buried in the church's cemetery.

Before 1958, St. John's did not have enough members to stay open year-round, but the number of members has increased to 400. The church building was renovated in 2004.
