= Brookland (Flat Rock, North Carolina) =

Historic house in North Carolina, United States

- U.S. National Register of Historic Places
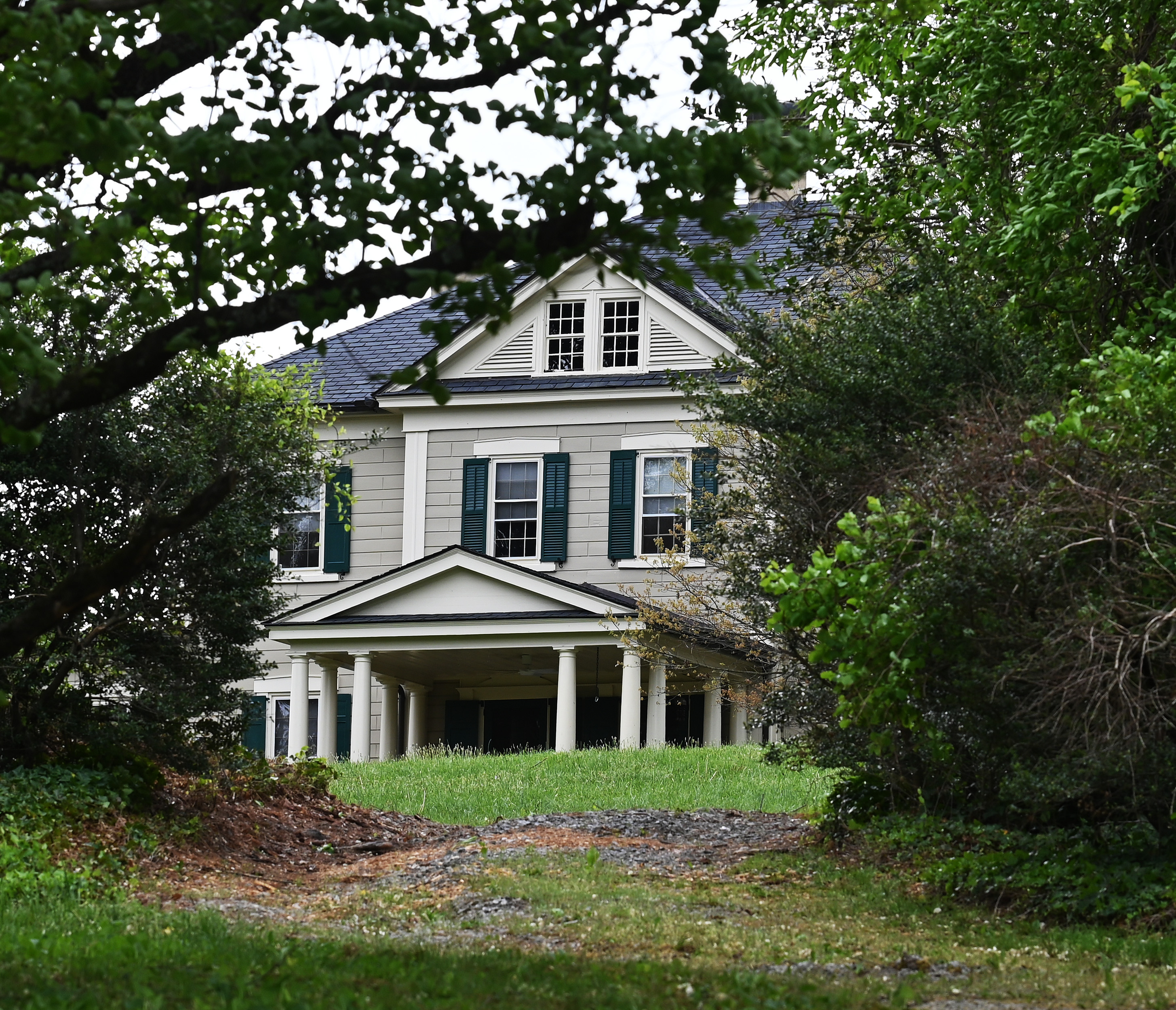

- Location within North Carolina Location within the United States
- Location: North of Flat Rock on SR 1863, near Flat Rock, North Carolina
- Coordinates: 35°18′10″N 82°26′57″W
- Area: 9.5 acres (3.8 ha)
- Built: 1836, 1880s & 1890s
- Built by: Charles Edmonston
- Architectural style: Colonial Revival, Greek Revival, Federal
- NRHP reference No.: 82003467
- Added to NRHP: August 19, 1982

Brookland is a historic home located near Flat Rock, Henderson County, North Carolina. It was built in 1836, and is a two-story, five-bay, double pile, transitional Federal / Greek Revival style roughcast frame dwelling. The house was updated with Colonial Revival inspired expansions and alterations introduced in the late-19th and early-20th century.

It was listed on the National Register of Historic Places in 1982.
