= Flat Rock Historic District =

Historic district in North Carolina, United States

- U.S. National Register of Historic Places
- U.S. Historic district
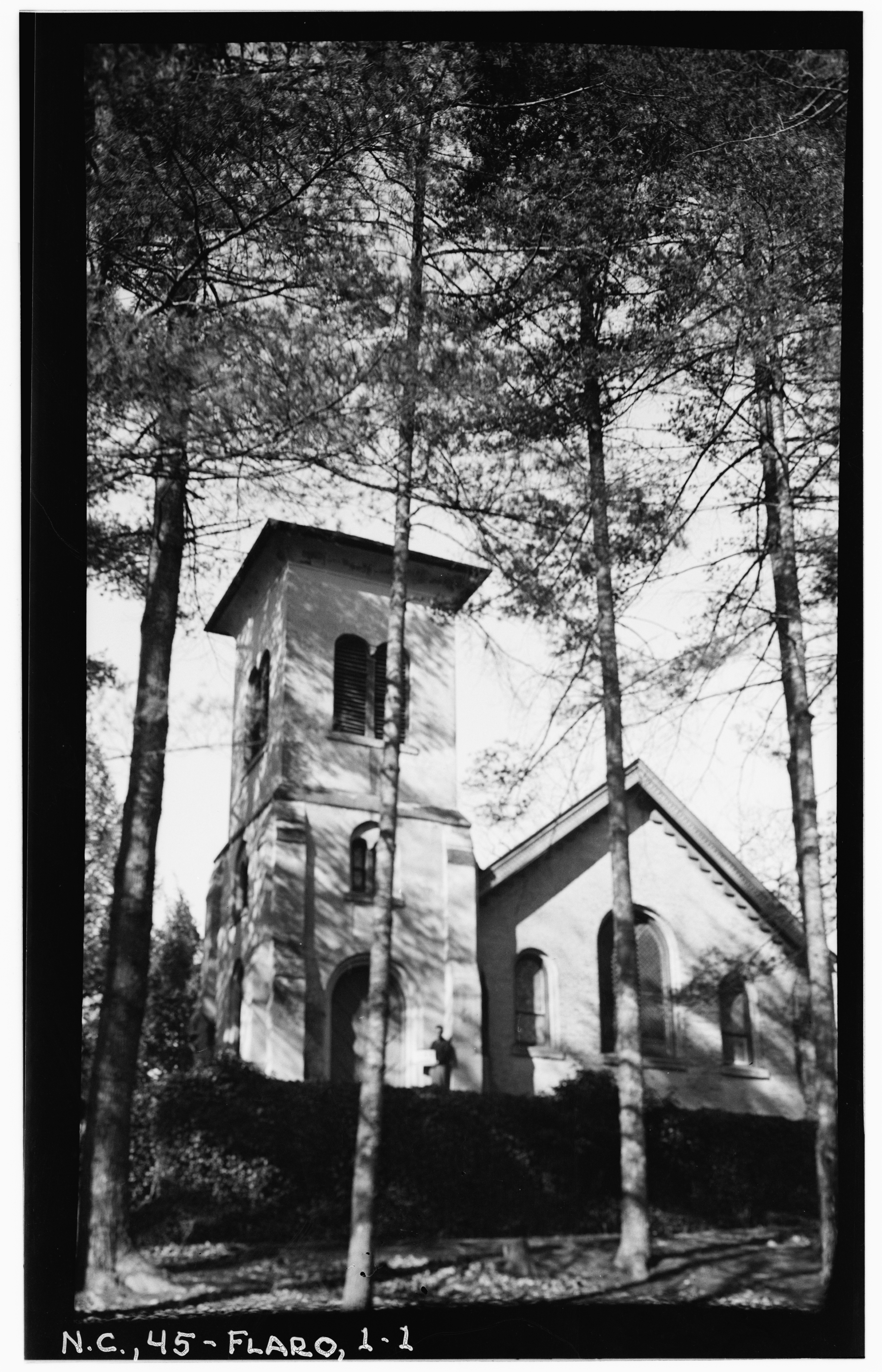
- Church of St. John-in-the-Wilderness, HABS Photo, January 1934

- Location within North Carolina Location within the United States
- Location: W of East Flat Rock, Flat Rock, North Carolina
- Coordinates: 35°16′18″N 82°27′41″W
- Area: 4,000 acres (1,600 ha)
- Architect: Multiple
- Architectural style: Stick/eastlake, Second Empire, Gothic
- NRHP reference No.: 73001352 (original); 14001176 (increase)

Significant dates
- Added to NRHP: October 15, 1973
- Boundary increase: February 27, 2015

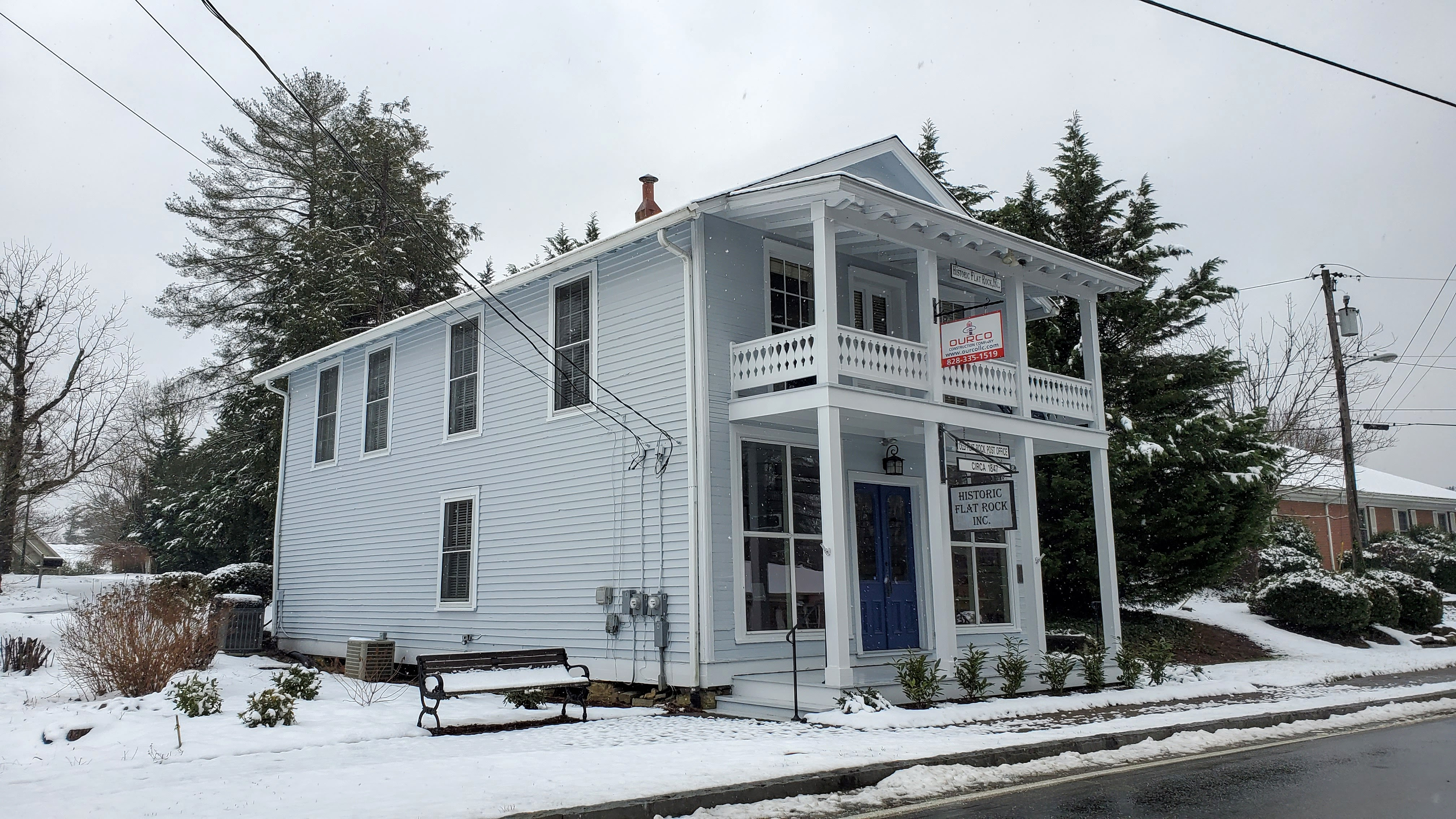
Former Flat Rock Post Office, 2021

Flat Rock Historic District is a national historic district located at Flat Rock, Henderson County, North Carolina. The district encompasses 55 contributing buildings and one contributing site associated with estates centering on the ambitious summer houses of the prominent Charlestonians. The homes includes notable examples of Stick Style / Eastlake movement, Second Empire, and Gothic Revival residential architecture. Located in the district is the separately listed Carl Sandburg Home National Historic Site, also known as Connemara (Rock Hill). Other notable estates include Mountain Lodge, Argyle, Beaumont, Tall Trees (Greenlawn), Many Pines, Chanteloupe, Teneriffe, Rutledge Cottage, Dunroy, Treholm-Rhett House home of George Trenholm, Kenmure (Glenroy), Vincennes (Elliott House) home of William Elliott, Sallie Parker House, Enchantment, Bonclarken (Heidleberg), Saluda Cottages (San Souci), Tranquility, and the Rhue House. Also located in the district is St. John-in-the-Wilderness church and rectory, the Old Post Office, Woodfield Inn (Farmer's Hotel), The Lowndes Place (State Theater of North Carolina).

It was listed on the National Register of Historic Places in 1973; its boundaries were adjusted in 2015.

== See also ==
- National Register of Historic Places listings in Henderson County, North Carolina
