= Zirconia, North Carolina =

- Unincorporated community
- Location within North Carolina Location within the United States
- Coordinates: 35°14′30″N 82°24′58″W
- Country: United States
- State: North Carolina
- County: Henderson
- Elevation: 2,185 ft (666 m)
- Time zone: UTC-5 (Eastern (EST))
  - Summer (DST): UTC-4 (EDT)
- ZIP code: 28790
- Area code: 828
- GNIS feature ID: 1023354

Zirconia is an unincorporated community in Henderson County, North Carolina, United States. Zirconia is located on North Carolina Highway 225, 5.9 miles (9.5 km) south-southeast of Hendersonville. Zirconia has a post office with ZIP code 28790, which opened on June 9, 1853. The community was named for the valuable deposits of zircon in the area.
