= Flat Rock, Henderson County, North Carolina =

Flat Rock, North Carolina
- Village
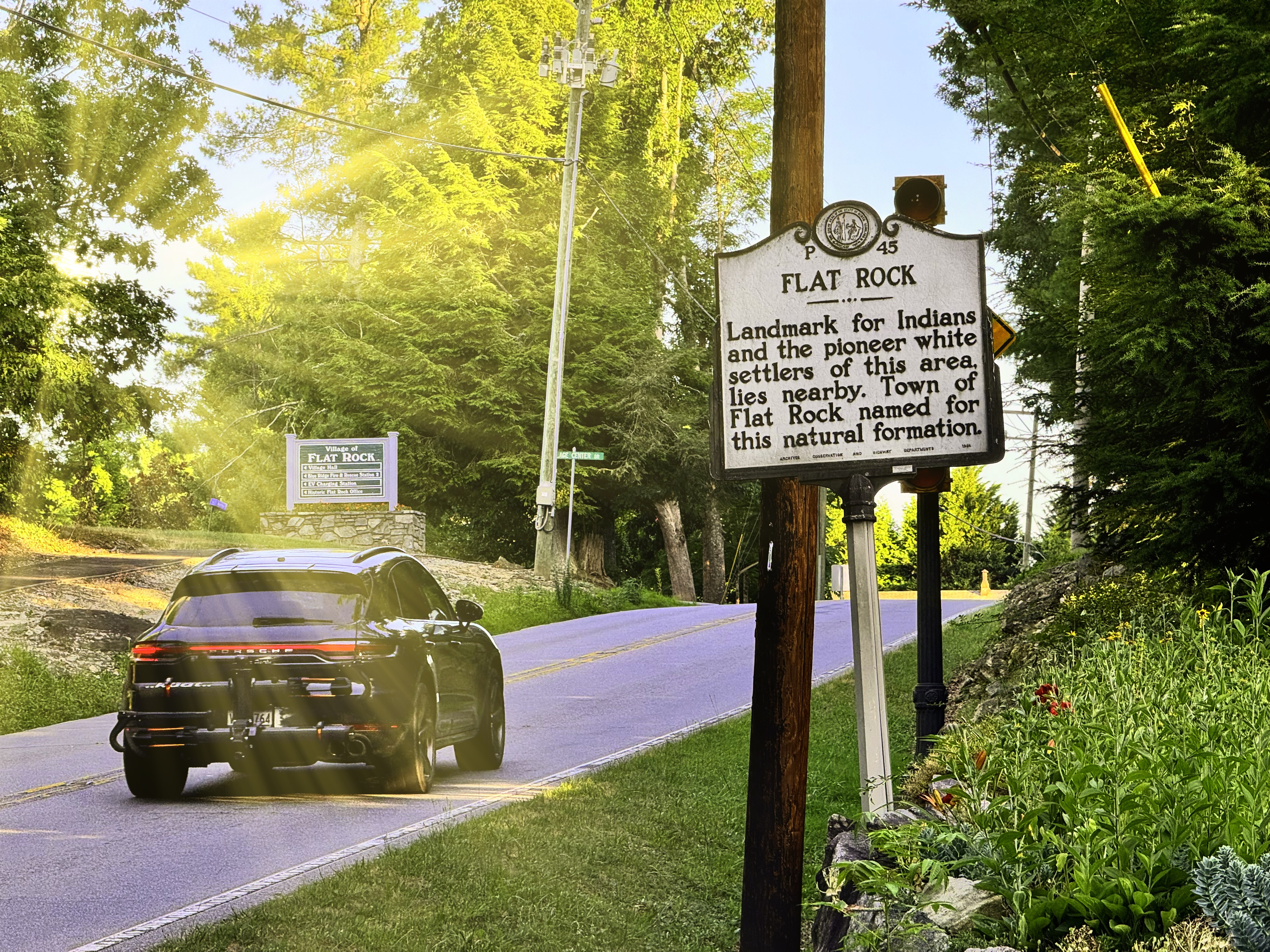
- Historical marker on NC 225

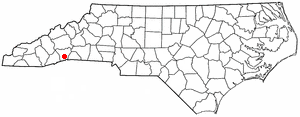
- Location of Flat Rock, North Carolina
- Coordinates: 35°16′04″N 82°27′09″W
- Country: United States
- State: North Carolina
- County: Henderson
- Incorporated: 1996
- Named for: Rock formation

Government
  - Mayor: Anne Coletta

Area
  - Total: 8.23 sq mi (21.31 km^{2})
  - Land: 8.10 sq mi (20.98 km^{2})
  - Water: 0.13 sq mi (0.33 km^{2})
- Elevation: 2,543 ft (775 m)

Population (2020)
  - Total: 3,486
  - Density: 430.3/sq mi (166.14/km^{2})
- Time zone: UTC-5 (Eastern (EST))
  - Summer (DST): UTC-4 (EDT)
- ZIP code: 28731
- Area code: 828
- FIPS code: 37-23600
- GNIS feature ID: 2407454
- Website: www.villageofflatrock.org

Flat Rock is a village in Henderson County, North Carolina, United States. The population was 3,114 at the 2010 census. It is part of the Asheville Metropolitan Statistical Area.

== History ==
Charles Baring and Susan Heyward Baring built Mountain Lodge in 1827 as the community became known as the "Little Charleston of the Mountains" due to an influx of wealthy summer residents from the South Carolina Low Country. Historic Flat Rock Inc. bought the abandoned house and sold it in 2014 to Julien Smythe, a descendant of an owner of Connemara who along with wife Lori renovated the house.

A post office called Flat Rock has been in operation since 1829. The village was named for granite rock formations which dotted the landscape.

A number of buildings in the village are included in the Flat Rock Historic District listed on the National Register of Historic Places. Also on the Register are Brookland and Carl Sandburg Home National Historic Site.

== Geography ==
Flat Rock is located in south-central Henderson County. It is bordered to the north by Hendersonville, the county seat, and to the east by unincorporated East Flat Rock. North Carolina Highway 225 (Greenville Highway) is the main road through the village, leading north 4 miles (6 km) to the center of Hendersonville and south 3 miles (5 km) to Zirconia. Asheville is 25 miles (40 km) to the north, and the South Carolina border is 8 miles (13 km) to the south.

According to the United States Census Bureau, the village has a total area of 8.2 square miles (21.3 km^{2}), of which 8.1 square miles (21.0 km^{2}) are land and 0.1 square miles (0.3 km^{2}), or 1.56%, are water. The town is drained by King Creek and Meminger Creek, tributaries of the French Broad River and part of the Tennessee River watershed.

== Government ==
The village of Flat Rock is governed under a mayor/council form of government. The Mayor and City Council members are elected to staggered four-year terms. Currently the mayor of Flat Rock is Anne Coletta, who was elected unopposed on November 5, 2024. She is the first female mayor in village history. There are also 5 city council members.

== Demographics ==
Historical population
Census	Pop.	Note	%±
1960	1,808		—
1970	1,688		−6.6%
1980	1,922		13.9%
1990	1,812		−5.7%
2000	2,565		41.6%
2010	3,114		21.4%
2020	3,486		11.9%
U.S. Decennial Census

=== 2020 census ===
Flat Rock racial composition
Race	Number	Percentage
White (non-Hispanic)	3,259	93.49%
Black or African American (non-Hispanic)	23	0.66%
Native American	8	0.23%
Asian	16	0.46%
Pacific Islander	4	0.11%
Other/Mixed	80	2.29%
Hispanic or Latino	96	2.75%

As of the 2020 United States census, there were 3,486 people, 1,590 households, and 1,071 families residing in the village.

=== 2000 census ===
As of the census of 2000, there were 2,565 people, 1,169 households, and 937 families residing in the village. The population density was 327.1 inhabitants per square mile (126.3/km^{2}). There were 1,459 housing units at an average density of 186.0 per square mile (71.8/km^{2}). The racial makeup of the village was 98.83% White, 0.47% African American, 0.04% Native American, 0.12% Asian, 0.04% from other races, and 0.51% from two or more races. Hispanic or Latino of any race were 1.17% of the population.

There were 1,169 households, out of which 15.3% had children under the age of 18 living with them, 76.5% were married couples living together, 1.8% had a female householder with no husband present, and 19.8% were non-families. 18.0% of all households were made up of individuals, and 10.9% had someone living alone who was 65 years of age or older. The average household size was 2.19 and the average family size was 2.46.

In the village, the population was spread out, with 13.6% under the age of 18, 2.3% from 18 to 24, 13.4% from 25 to 44, 34.9% from 45 to 64, and 35.8% who were 65 years of age or older. The median age was 58 years. For every 100 females, there were 99.3 males. For every 100 females age 18 and over, there were 95.0 males.

The median income for a household in the village was $67,813, and the median income for a family was $81,811. Males had a median income of $55,263 versus $34,375 for females. The per capita income for the village was $42,222. About 0.3% of families and 1.5% of the population were below the poverty line, including none of those under age 18 and 2.5% of those age 65 or over.

== Arts and culture ==
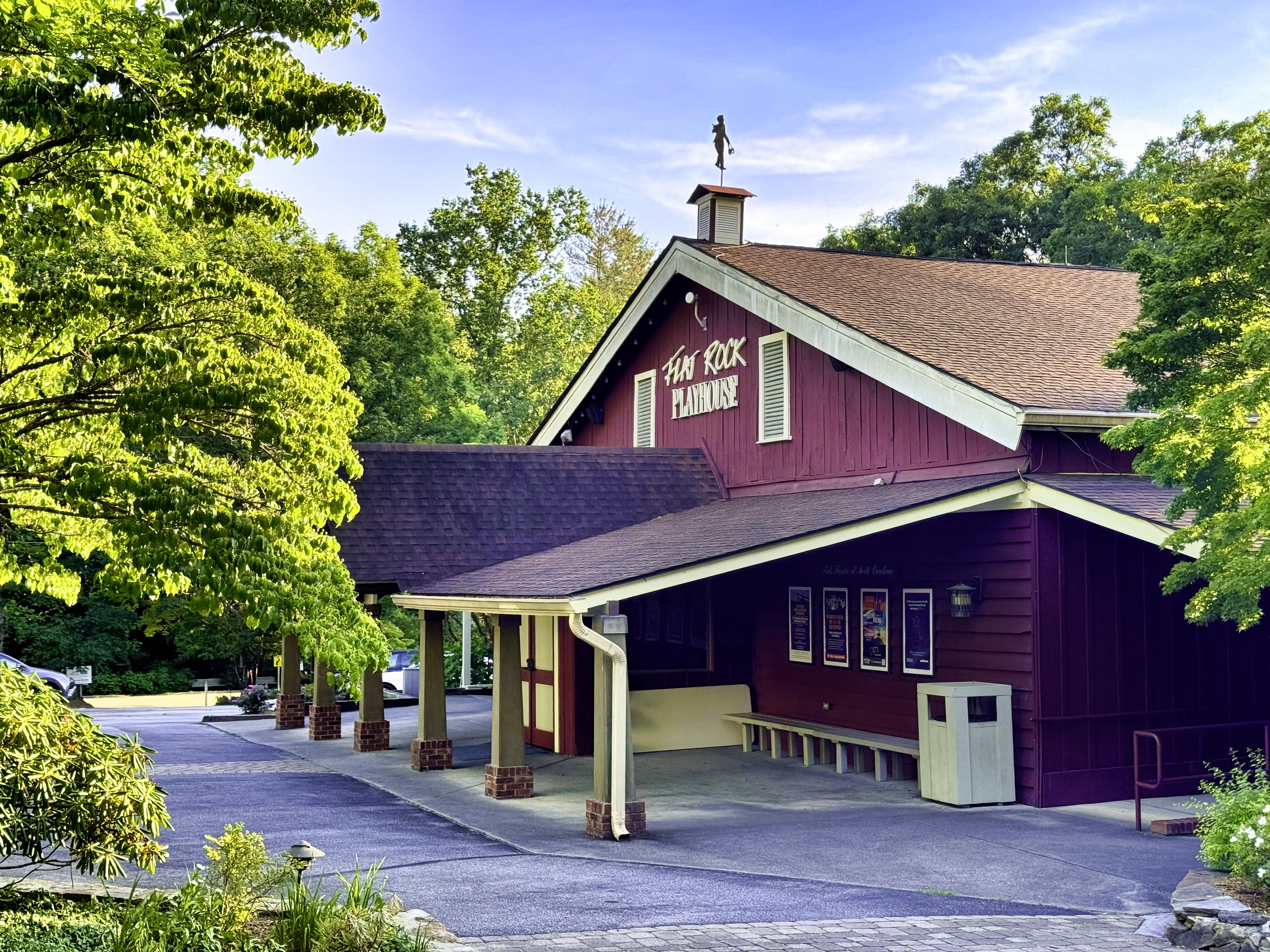
Flat Rock Playhouse is the state theatre of North Carolina

Flat Rock is home to the Flat Rock Playhouse, the State Theatre of North Carolina. The Associate Reformed Presbyterian Church retreat Bonclarken is located in Flat Rock. It also is home to the main campus of Blue Ridge Community College.

The Historic Flat Rock Cultural Center and Museum opened in the former post office June 3, 2017.

== Notable people ==
- Chuck Edwards, U.S. Representative, former North Carolina state senator
- Mitchell Campbell King (1815–1901), 19th-century planter and physician.
- Christopher Memminger, the first Secretary of the Treasury for the Confederacy, had his summer home here, which he called "Rock Hill," later called "Connemara". He is interred in Flat Rock.
- Carl Sandburg lived in the village from 1945 until his death in 1967. His home, once owned by Memminger, is part of the Carl Sandburg Home National Historic Site and a major tourist attraction in the village.
- Buffalo Bob Smith (1917–1998), TV host of long-running children's program "Howdy Doody," retired to the Kenmure section of Flat Rock, yet sometimes used a Hendersonville address.
- Roy Williams (basketball coach), Hall of Fame Former Head Basketball Coach of the University of Kansas (1988-2003) and the University of North Carolina (2003-2021) retired to Flat Rock.
- George A. Trenholm, a summer resident, was the second Secretary of the Treasury for the Confederacy, from July 18, 1864, to April 27, 1865.
