= Carl Sandburg Home National Historic Site =

Historic house in North Carolina, US

- U.S. National Register of Historic Places
- U.S. National Historic Landmark District
- U.S. National Historic Site
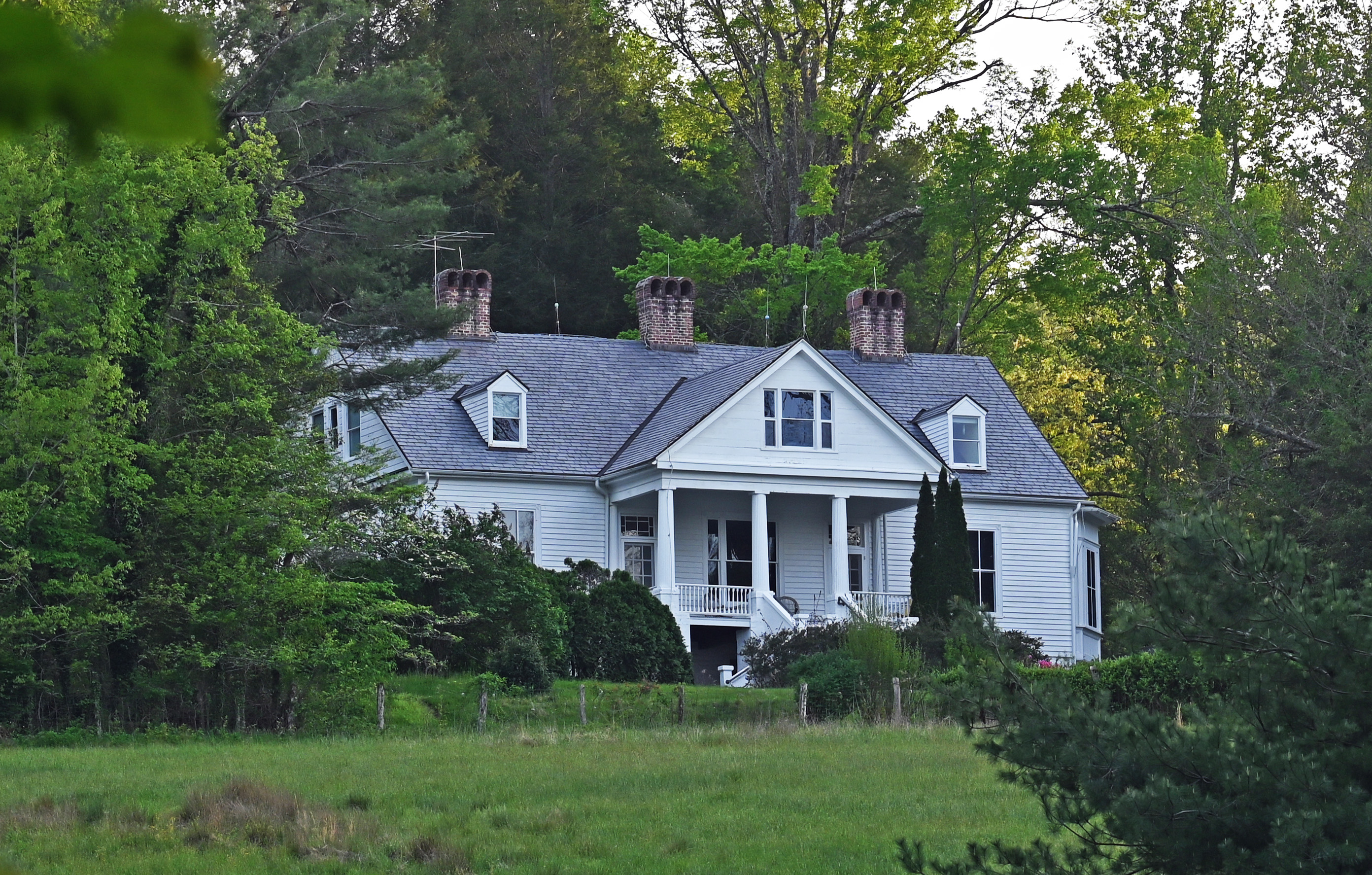
- Carl Sandburg's last house

- Location within North Carolina Location within the United States
- Location: Flat Rock, North Carolina, USA
- Nearest city: Hendersonville, North Carolina
- Coordinates: 35°16′17″N 82°26′50″W
- Area: 246 acres (100 ha)
- Built: 1945
- Visitation: 94,796 (2025)
- Website: Carl Sandburg Home National Historic Site
- NRHP reference No.: 68000013

Significant dates
- Added to NRHP: October 17, 1968
- Designated NHLD: May 23, 1968
- Designated NHS: October 17, 1968

Carl Sandburg Home National Historic Site, located at 81 Carl Sandburg Lane near Hendersonville in the village of Flat Rock, North Carolina, preserves Connemara, the home of Pulitzer Prize-winning poet and writer Carl Sandburg. Though a Midwesterner, Sandburg and his family moved to this home in 1945 for the peace and solitude required for his writing and the more than 30 acres (120,000 m^{2}) of pastureland required for his wife, Lilian, to raise her champion dairy goats. Sandburg spent the last twenty-two years of his life on this farm and published more than a third of his works while he resided here.

The 264-acre site includes the Sandburg residence, the goat farm, sheds, rolling pastures, mountainside woods, 5 miles (8 km) of hiking trails on moderate to steep terrain, two small lakes, several ponds, flower and vegetable gardens, and an apple orchard.

Visitors to the site can tour the Sandburg residence and visit the dairy barn housing Connemara Farms' goat herd, representing the three breeds of goats Lilian Sandburg raised. From mid-June until mid-August, live performances of Sandburg's Rootabaga Stories and excerpts from the Broadway play, The World of Carl Sandburg, are presented at the park amphitheater.

== The Memminger years ==
In the middle 1830s Christopher Memminger, of Charleston, South Carolina, took a tour of Flat Rock in an attempt to find a summer home. Unable to find a home he liked, he purchased land from Charles Baring, one of the more prominent landholders in the area. In 1838 he hired an architect to begin work on a large summer home in the Greek Revival style. The kitchen house and stable were actually completed first, in the summer of 1838. The house was not complete until 1839. A cook's house was added in 1841, a wagon shed in 1843, and an icehouse in 1845. An addition to the main house was constructed over the course of 1846–1849, and servant quarters were built in 1850.

Memminger called his summer home “Rock Hill,” possibly because the main house was constructed on the gradual slope of Big Glassy Mountain. In 1855, he had a stream in front of the house dammed up to create a small, artificial lake. The Memminger family spent most of their summers after 1839 at Rock Hill, not to be confused with Rock Hill, South Carolina. They lived there full-time from 1864 until the end of the Civil War. During the war, the house was fortified and used as a shelter for friends who needed protection from raids by Union soldiers and Confederate deserters turned bandits.

== The Gregg and Smyth years ==
After Memminger's death, his son Edward sold Rock Hill to Colonel William Gregg Jr., a Confederate veteran. During his ownership, he built new steps at the front of the house, since the originals had been removed during the war for defense. He also installed a bay window and fireplace mantles. The Greggs used Rock Hill as their summer home for about ten years before they sold it in 1900 to Captain Ellison Adger Smyth.

Smyth changed the name of the house from “Rock Hill” to “Connemara,” after his ancestral district in Ireland. The Smyths winterized the house and enclosed the porch to convert it to a dining room. They also painted the house green for a brief period and even installed an eight-hole golf course in the pastures. The captain and his family used Connemara as a summer home until 1925 when they decided to make it their permanent residence. Smyth died in 1942, and the house remained vacant until 1945.

== The Sandburg era ==
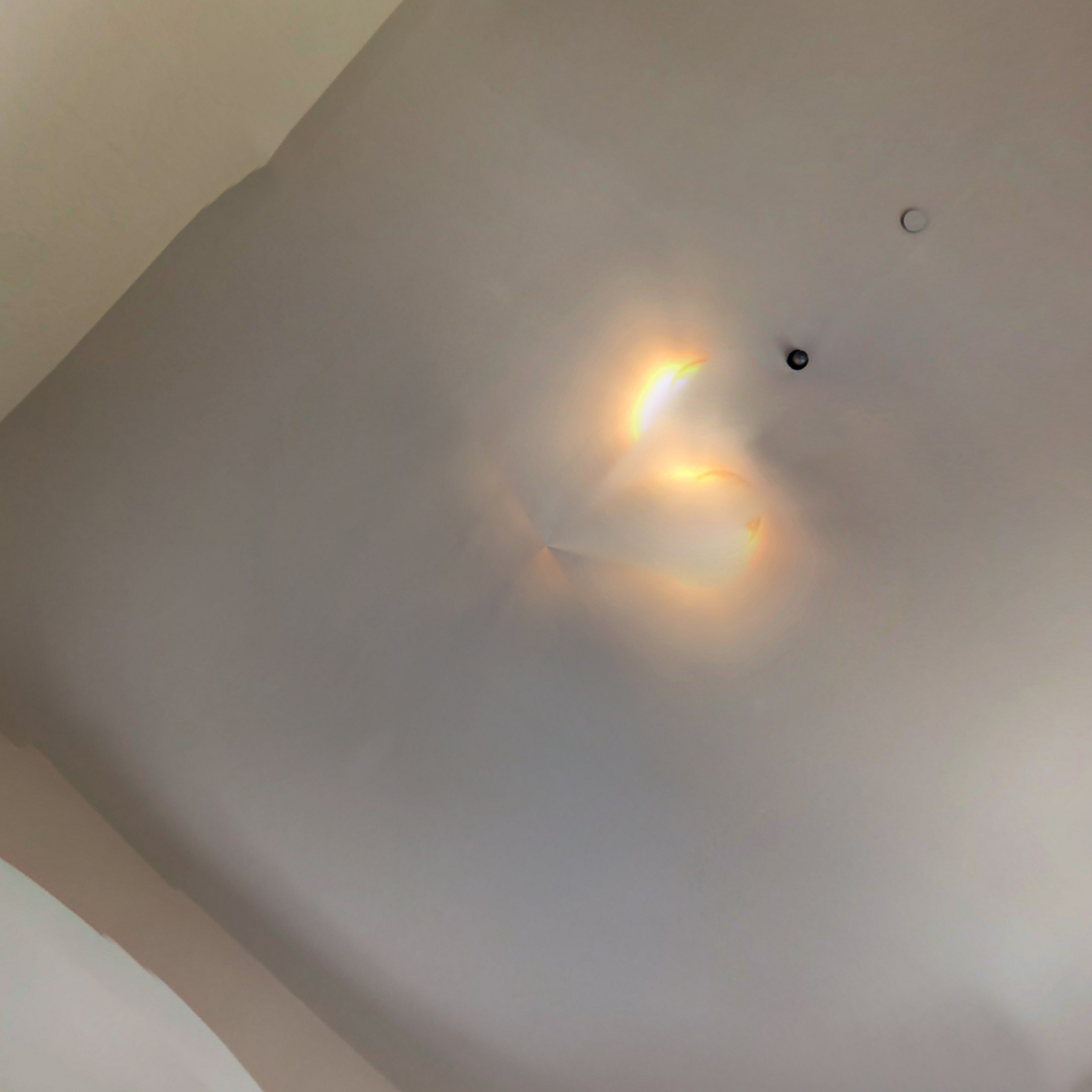
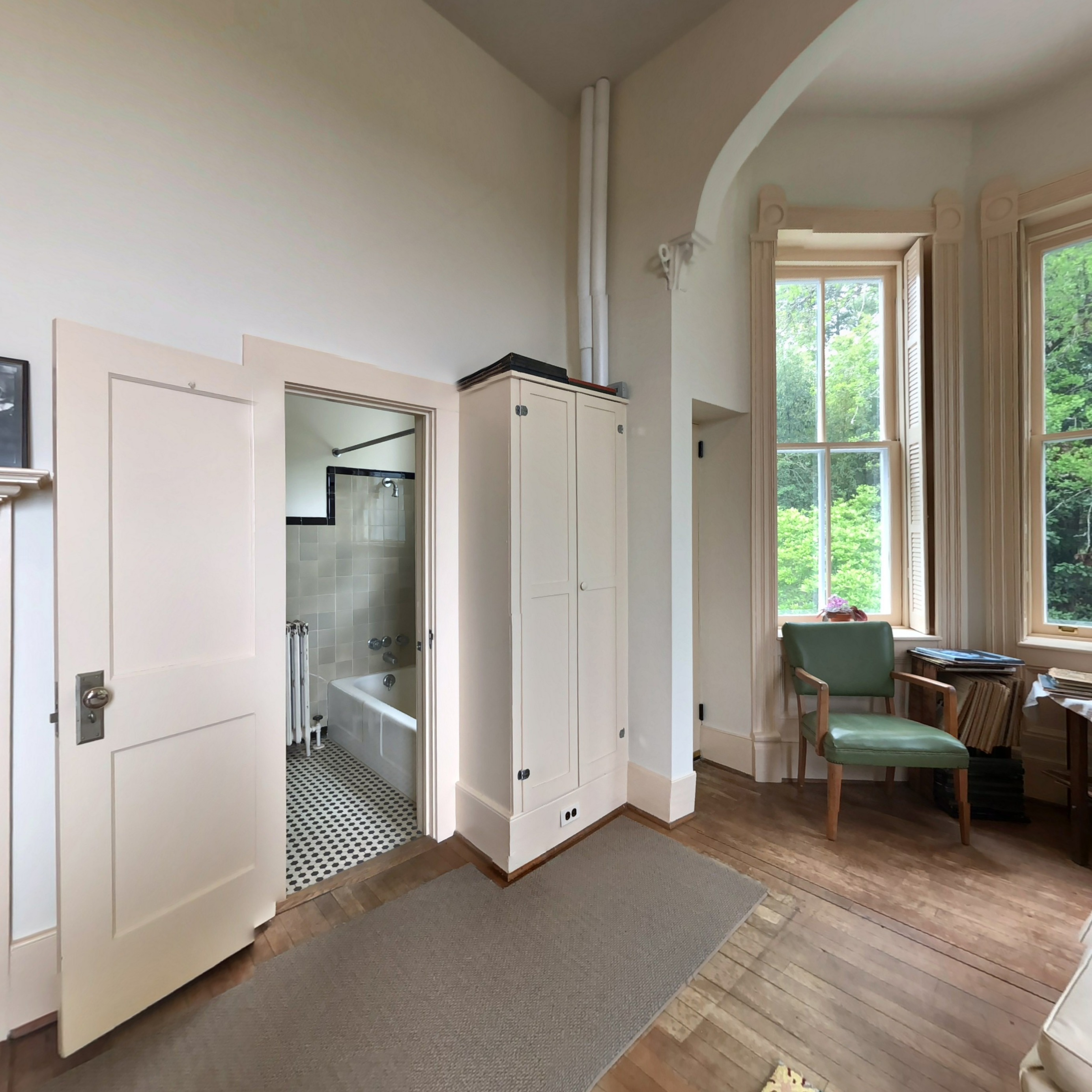
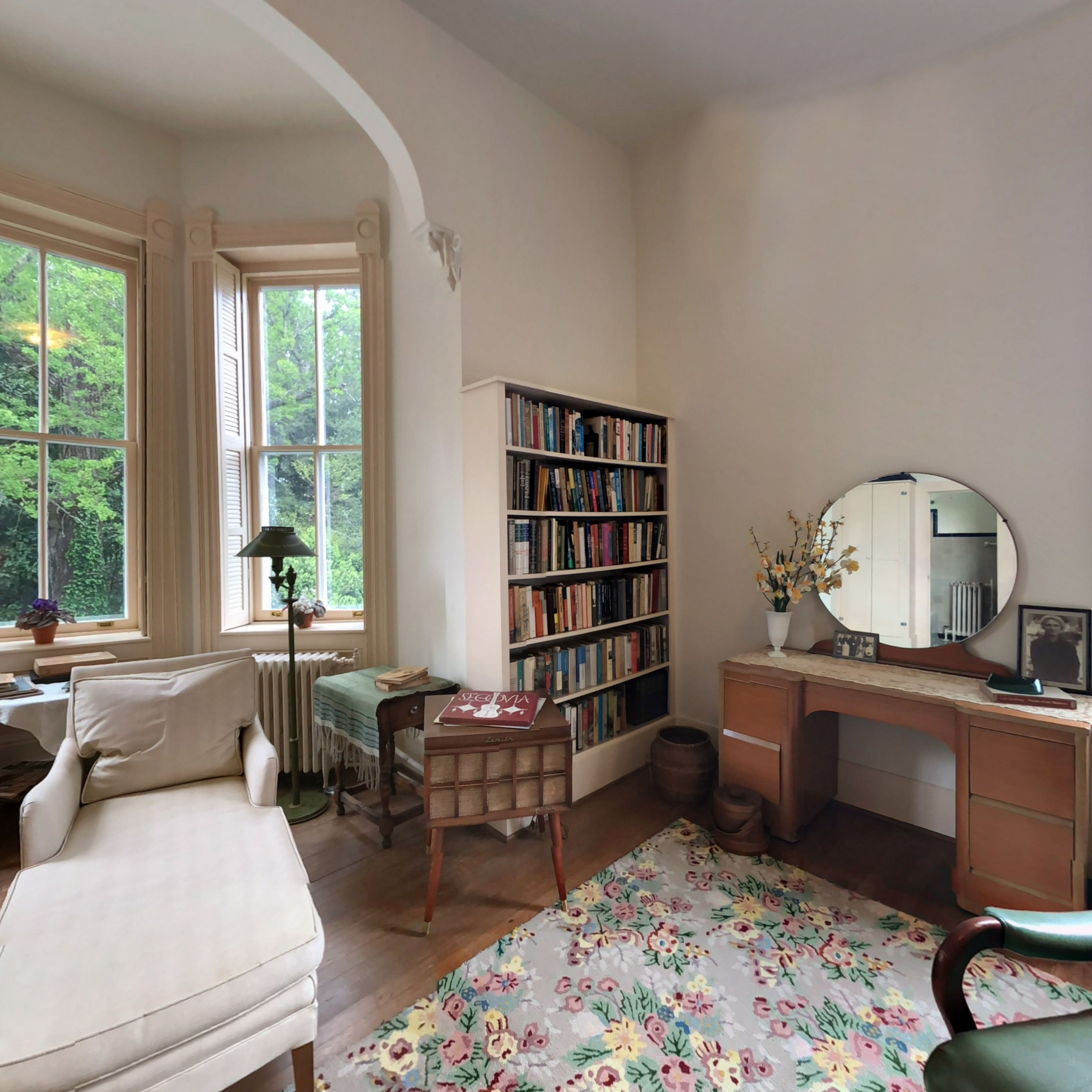
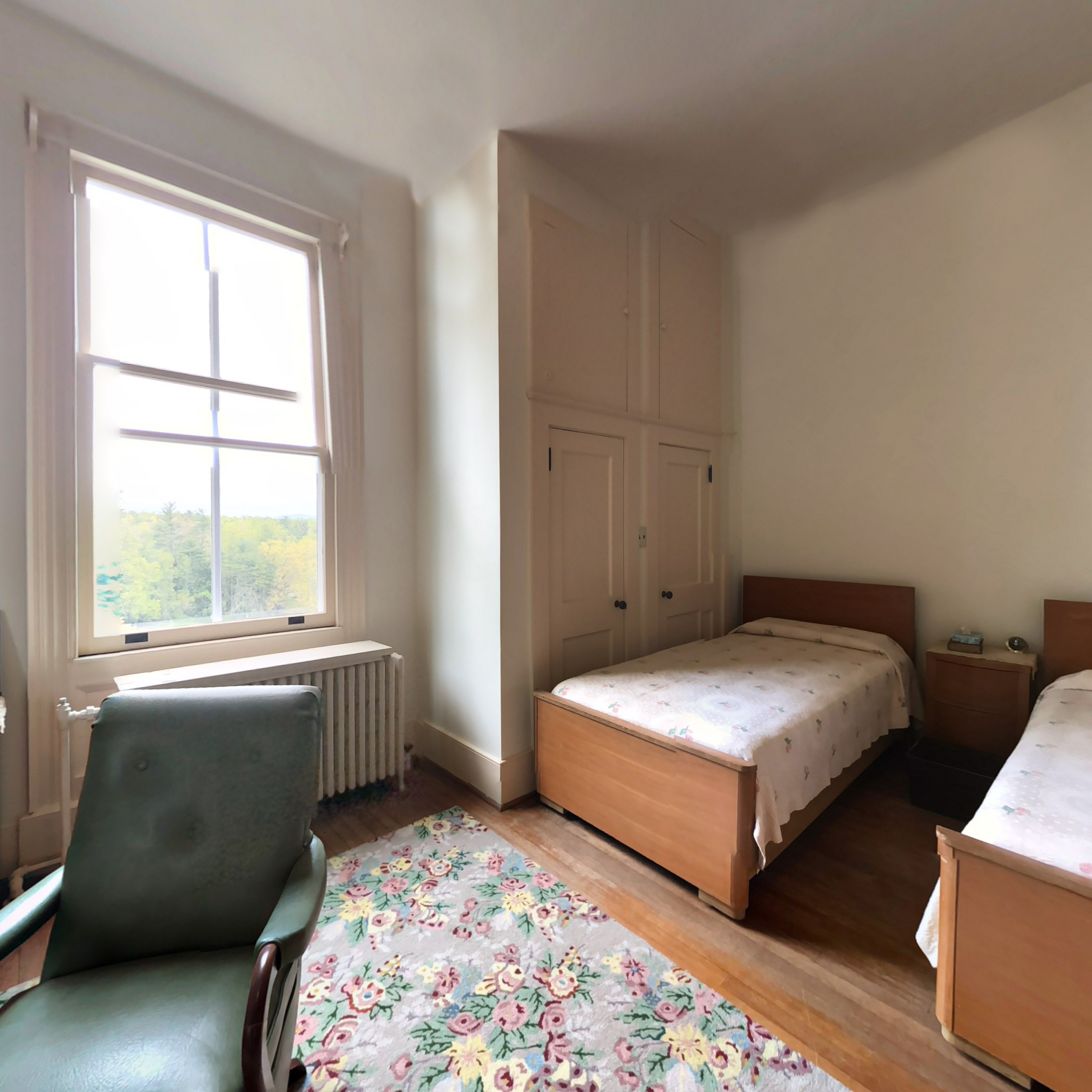
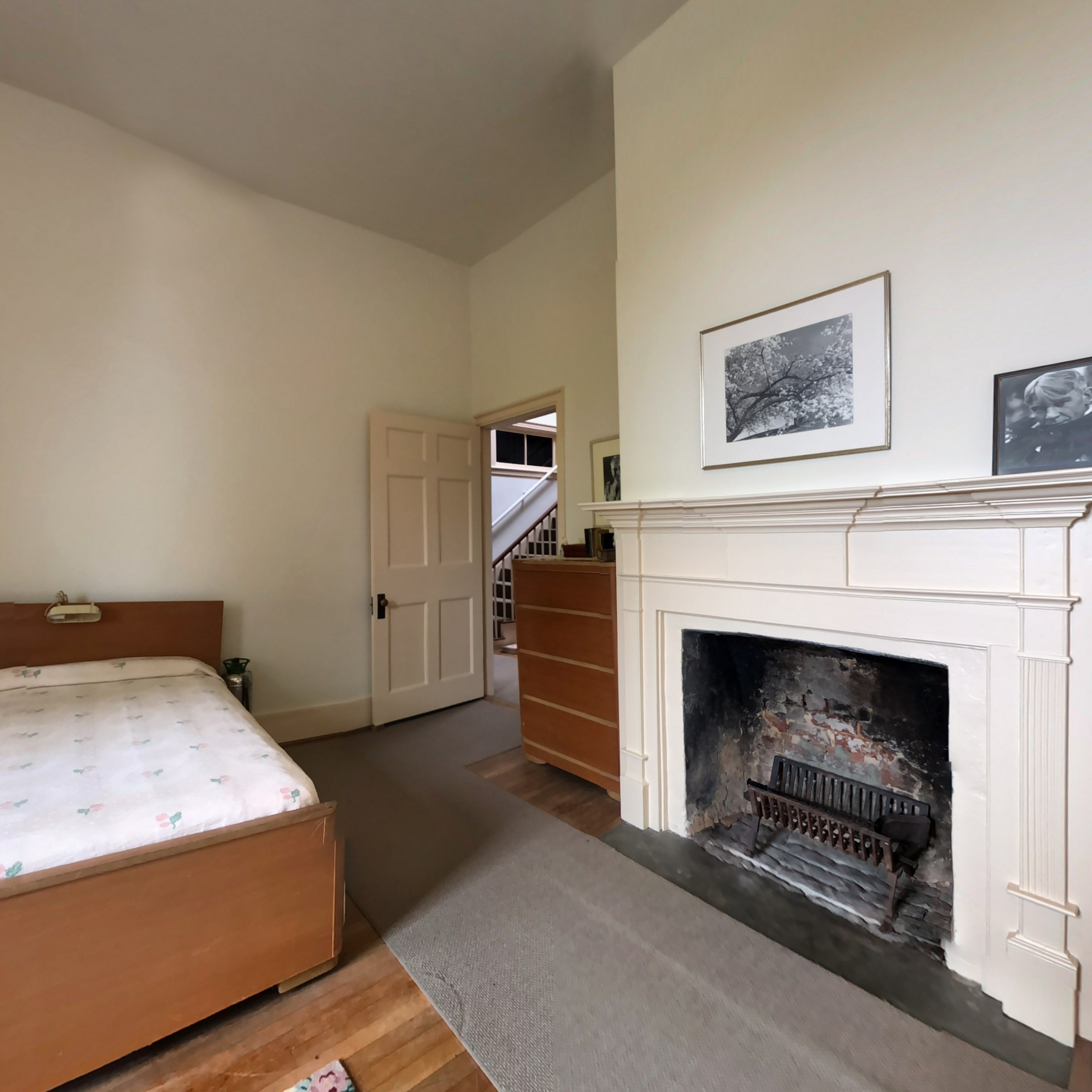
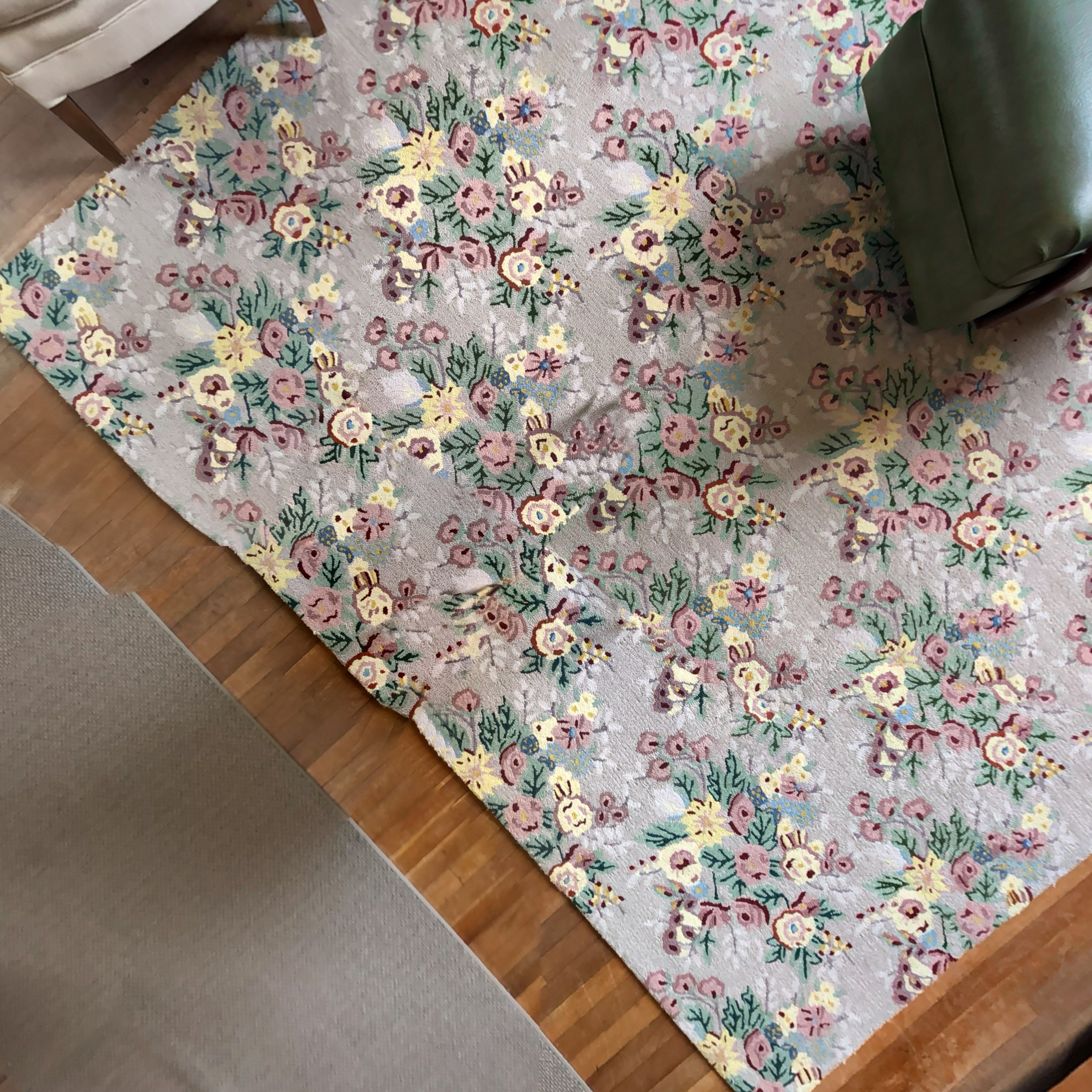
View of Mrs. Sandburg's bedroom

Sandburg purchased Connemara on October 18, 1945, for $45,000 . Mrs. Sandburg had been looking for a new farm in a warmer climate to raise her Chikaming dairy goats. When she showed Connemara to her husband, he reportedly said, “This is the place. We will look no further.” Upon buying the house, the Sandburgs immediately began remodeling. Contractors were hired to work on the heating, plumbing, electrical, the roof and the cement floor of the basement. The Sandburgs installed new chimneys and bathrooms, as well as dozens of bookshelves for his large library. They also repainted the house and installed a new indoor kitchen, having turned the original kitchen building into a three- car garage. The entire remodeling process lasted for some two and a half years. In addition, more than 42,000 lb (19,000 kg) of personal belongings, primarily Sandburg's library, were sent by train from their old house in Harbert, Michigan.

The Sandburgs lived at Connemara from October 1945 to July 1969. Mr. and Mrs. Sandburg lived there along with their three daughters, Margaret, Janet, and Helga, as well as Helga's two children, John Carl and Karlen Paula. Sandburg published more than a third of his works while living at Connemara, and it was at this house he died of natural causes in 1967. After his death, his wife decided to sell Connemara to the U.S. government to preserve the house as a memorial to her husband. The Secretary of Interior and family friend Stewart Udall visited the house in October 1967, and Mrs. Sandburg signed a deed of gift in June of the following year. On October 18, 1968, President Johnson approved a congressional act making the home a historic site. The home officially opened to the public in 1974. The National Park Service restored the house and installed Plexiglas covers over the bookcases during the time between the purchase and its opening. The site became the first national park to recognize a poet.

== The site today ==
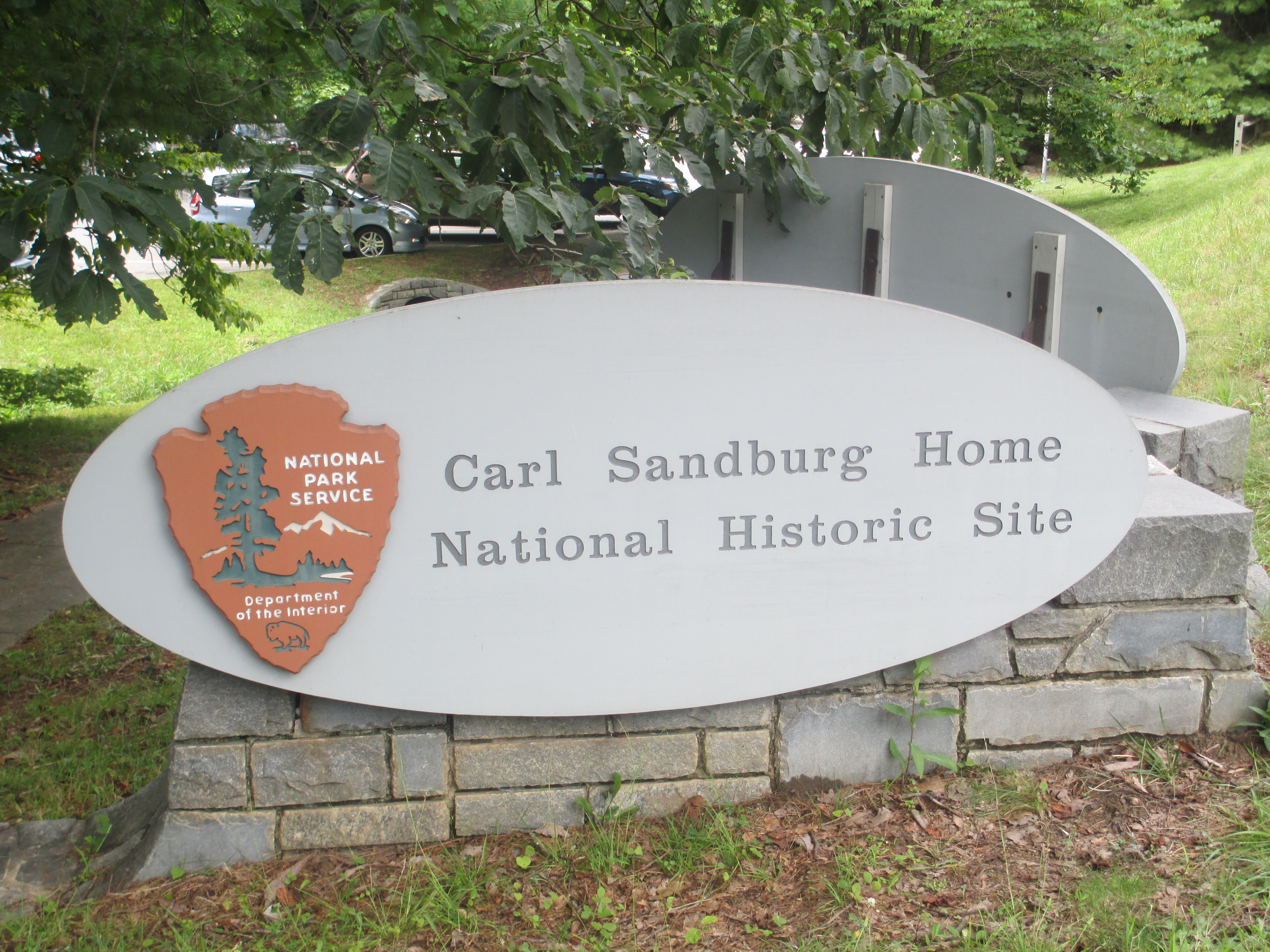
The Carl Sandburg National Historic Site is located in Flat Rock, North Carolina.

Today Carl Sandburg Home National Historic Site attracts more than 85,000 visitors a year. The national park is open every day except Thanksgiving, Christmas and New Year's Day.

The U.S. government has designated the goats a historic herd. About fifteen goats are kept on the farm at any given time. The interior of the home is arranged in a manner similar to how the Sandburgs maintained it during the 1950s.

The Consolidated Natural Resources Act of 2008, supported by North Carolina's congressional delegation, authorized the expansion of the site by 115 acres (0.47 km^{2}) to protect the scenic view, create additional parking, and establish a visitor center.

The park features a writer-in-residence program started in 2010 with the support of the Friends of Carl Sandburg at Connemara. This program offers emerging writers an opportunity to live and work at the Carl Sandburg Home National Historic Site for three weeks during April.

== Gallery ==
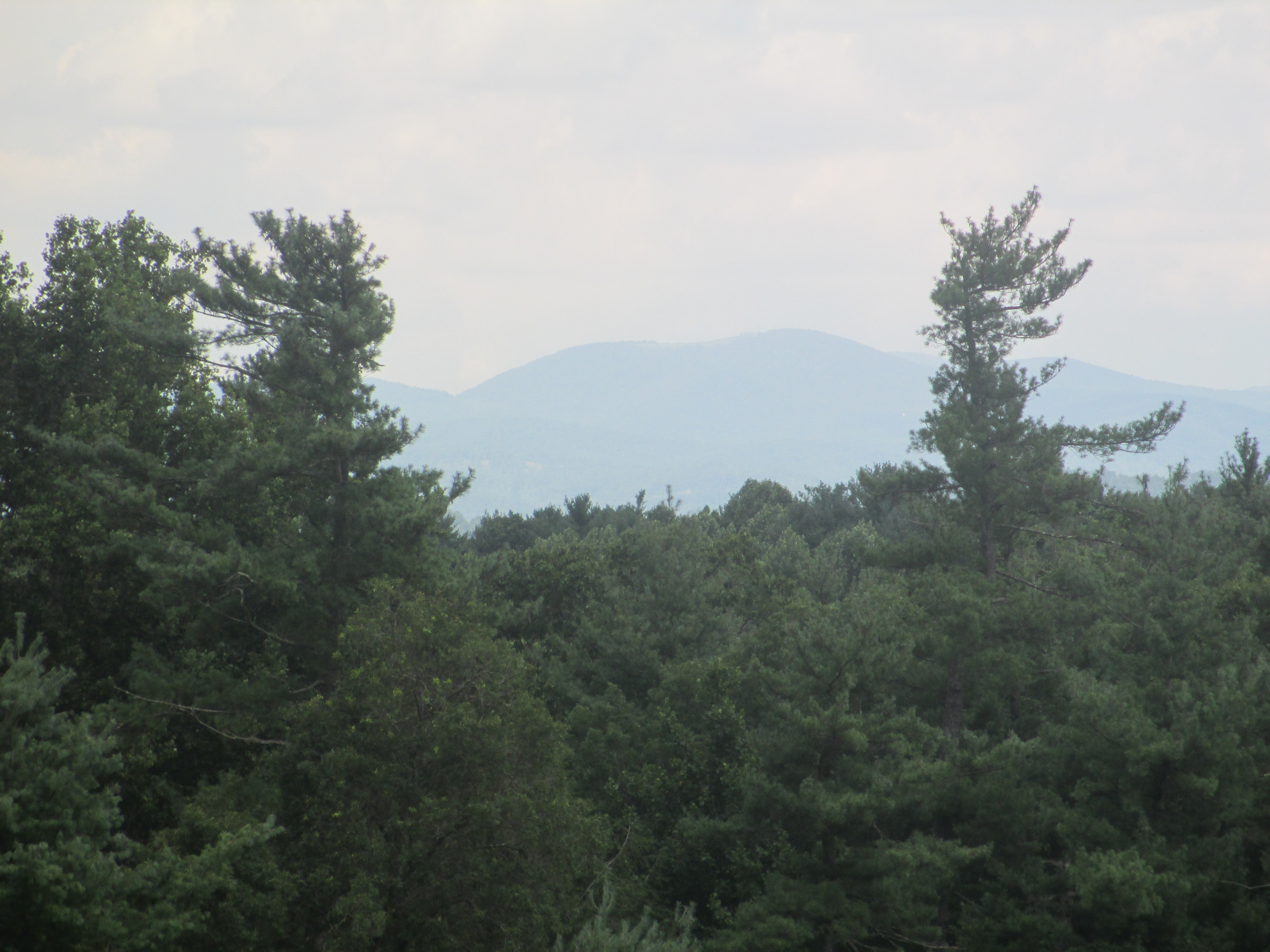
View of the Blue Ridge Mountains from Sandburg's front porch

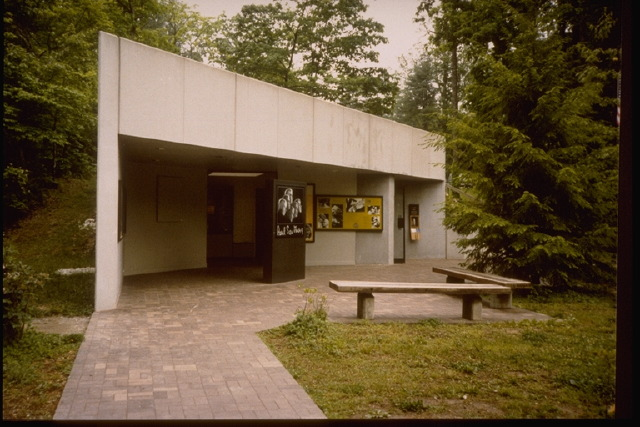
Exhibit station at the start of the trail to the Sandburg Home

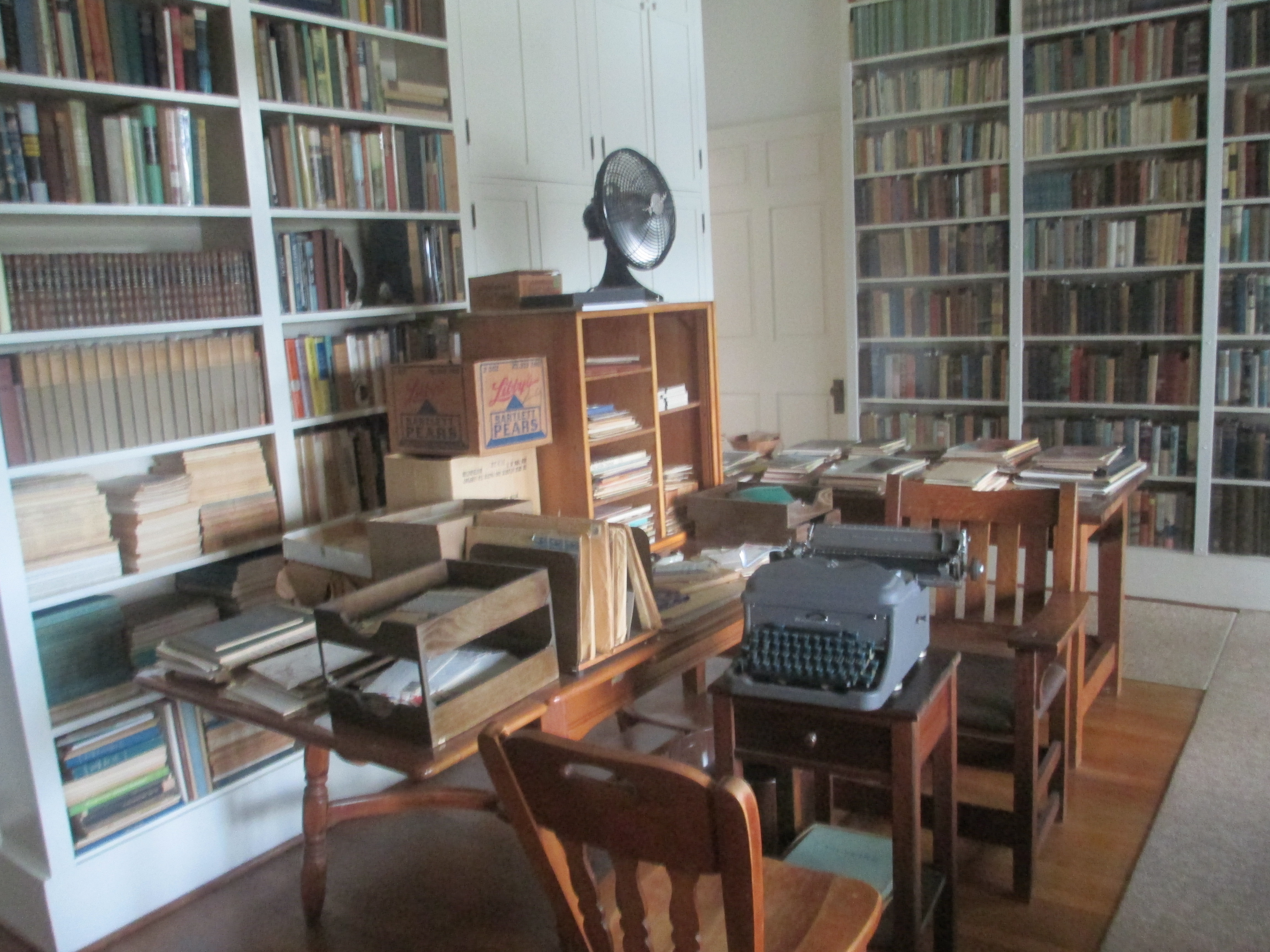
Most rooms, including the study at the Sandburg home, abound with books and periodicals.

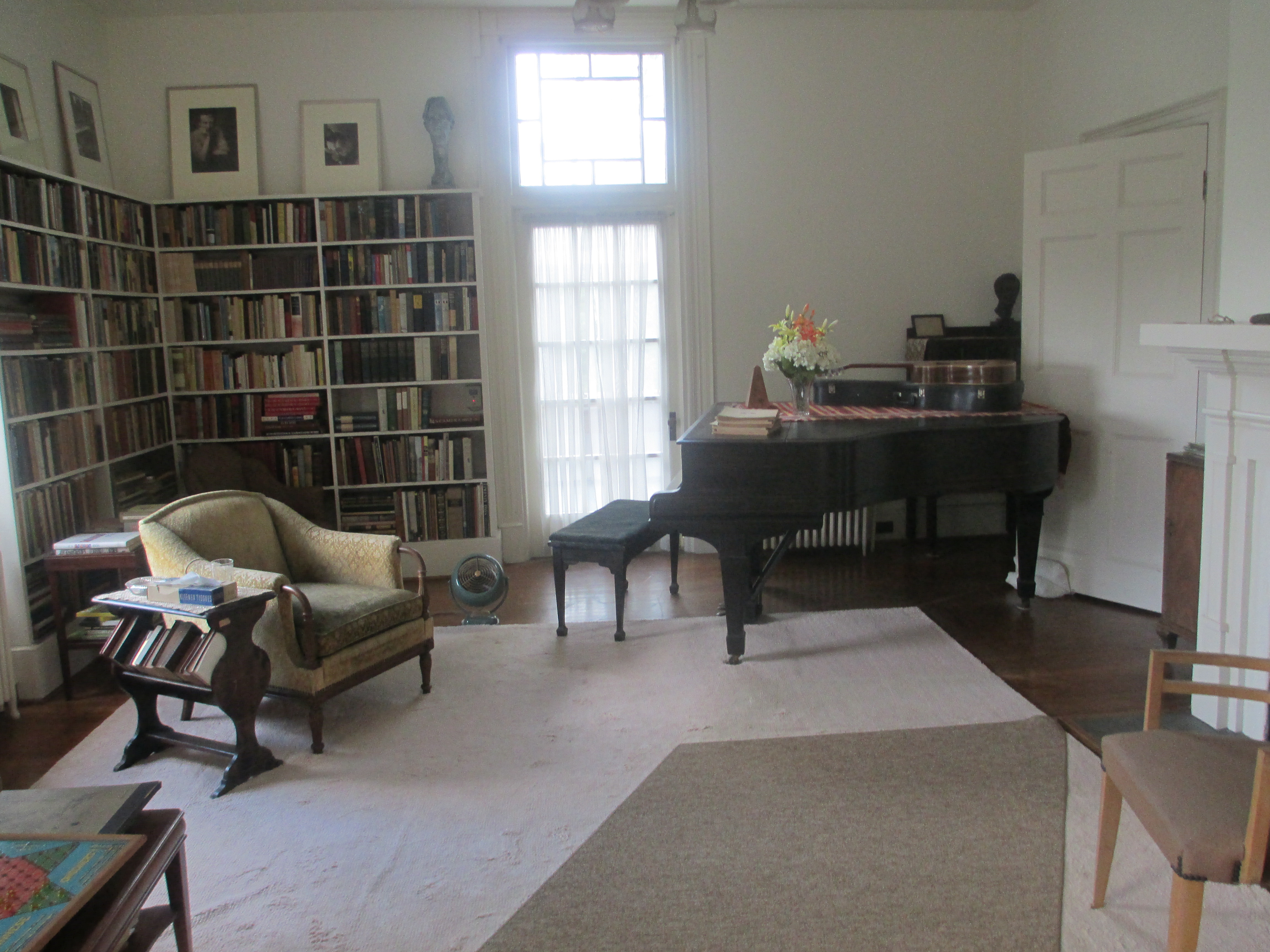
Sandburg parlor with piano; the Sandburgs were devotees of singing and musical instruments.

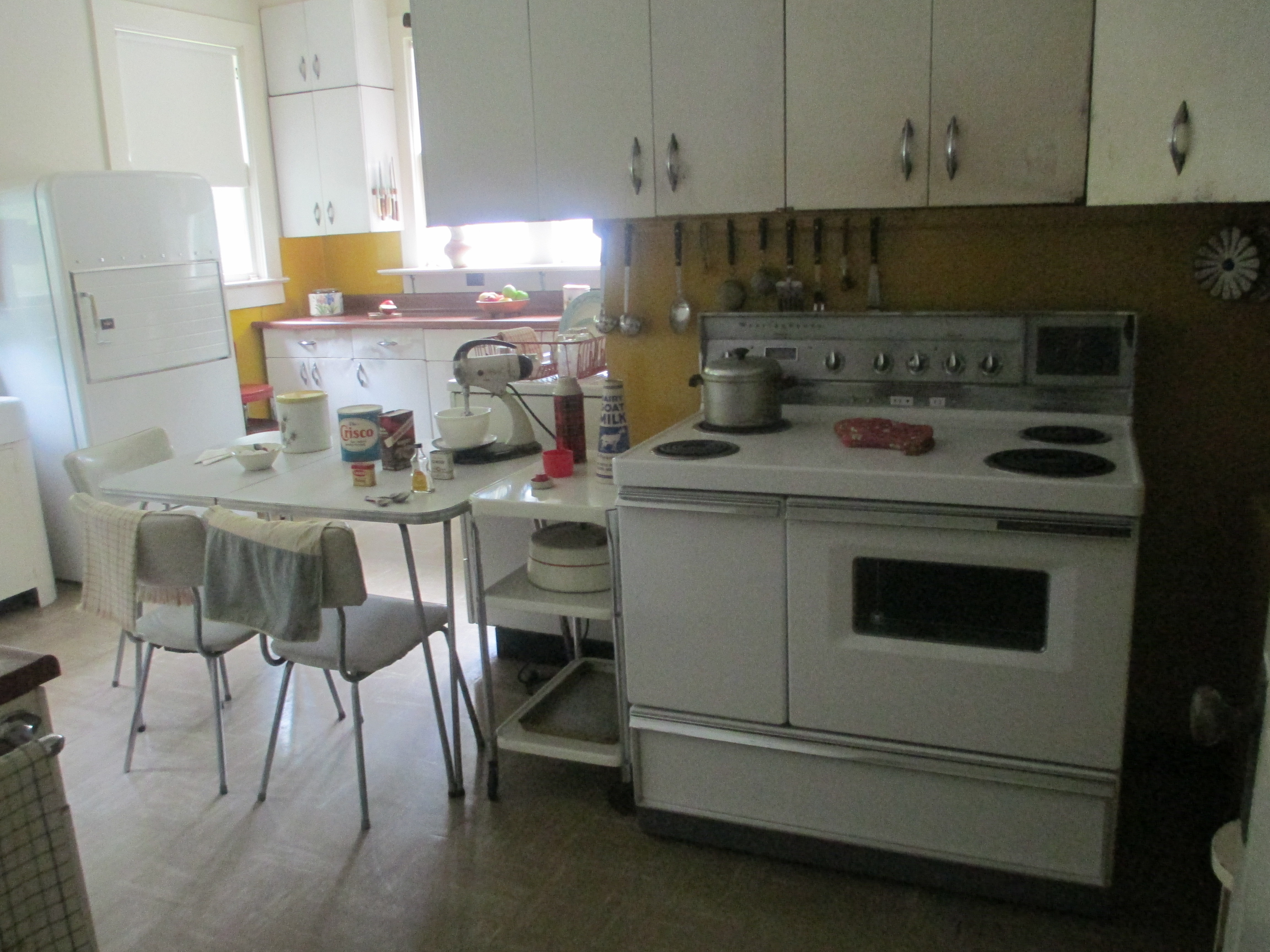
The Sandburg kitchen

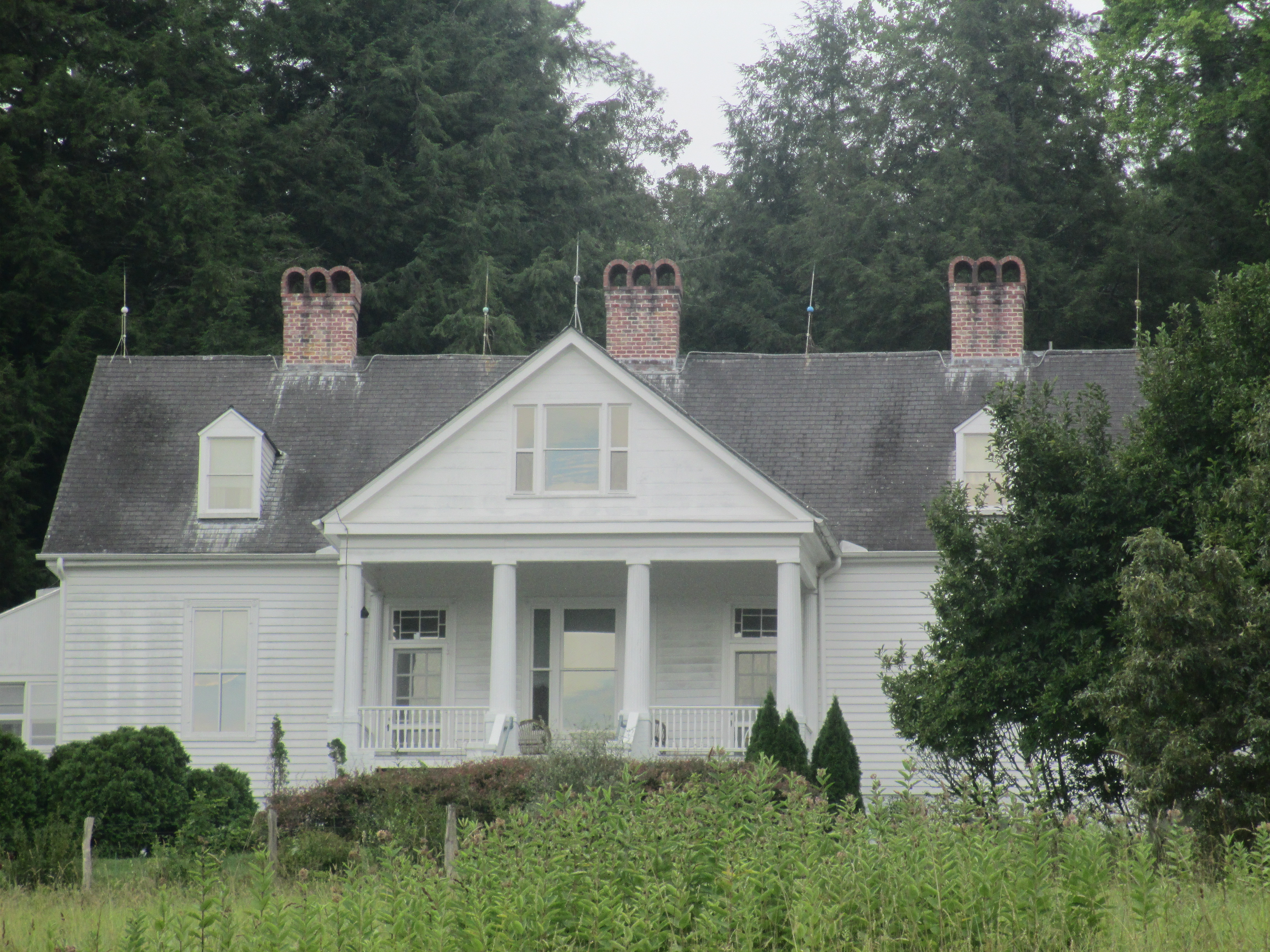
House from the yard

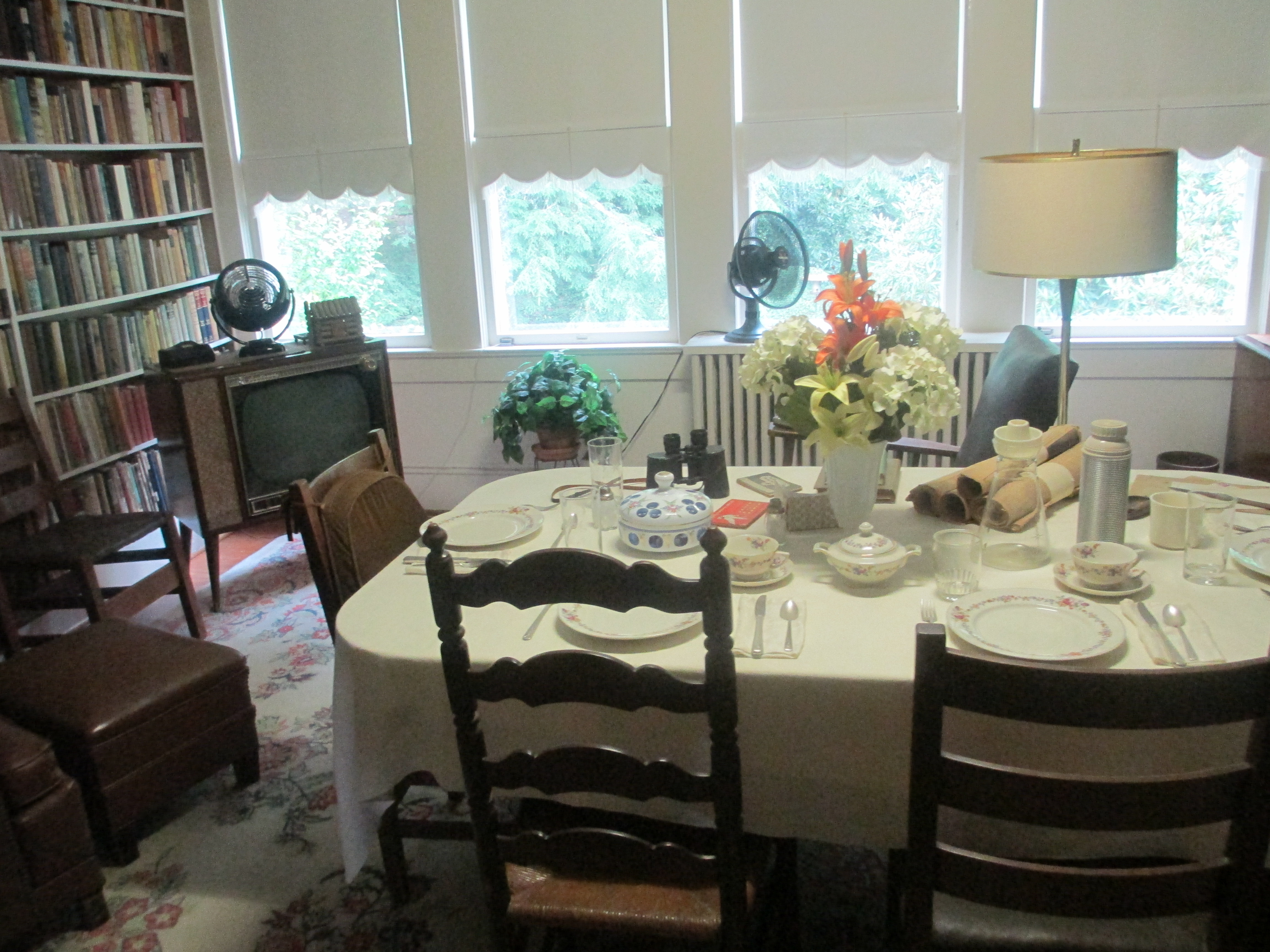
Sandburg dining room with 1950s television set, used mainly for news and public affairs programs

== See also ==
- Carl Sandburg State Historic Site, birthplace, boyhood home, and burial site
- List of National Historic Landmarks in North Carolina
- National Register of Historic Places listings in Henderson County, North Carolina
- List of residences of American writers
