= Euonymus wilsonii =

Scientific classification
- Kingdom: Plantae
- Clade: Tracheophytes
- Clade: Angiosperms
- Clade: Eudicots
- Clade: Rosids
- Order: Celastrales
- Family: Celastraceae
- Genus: Euonymus
- Species: E. wilsonii

Binomial name
- Euonymus wilsonii Sprague

Species of plant

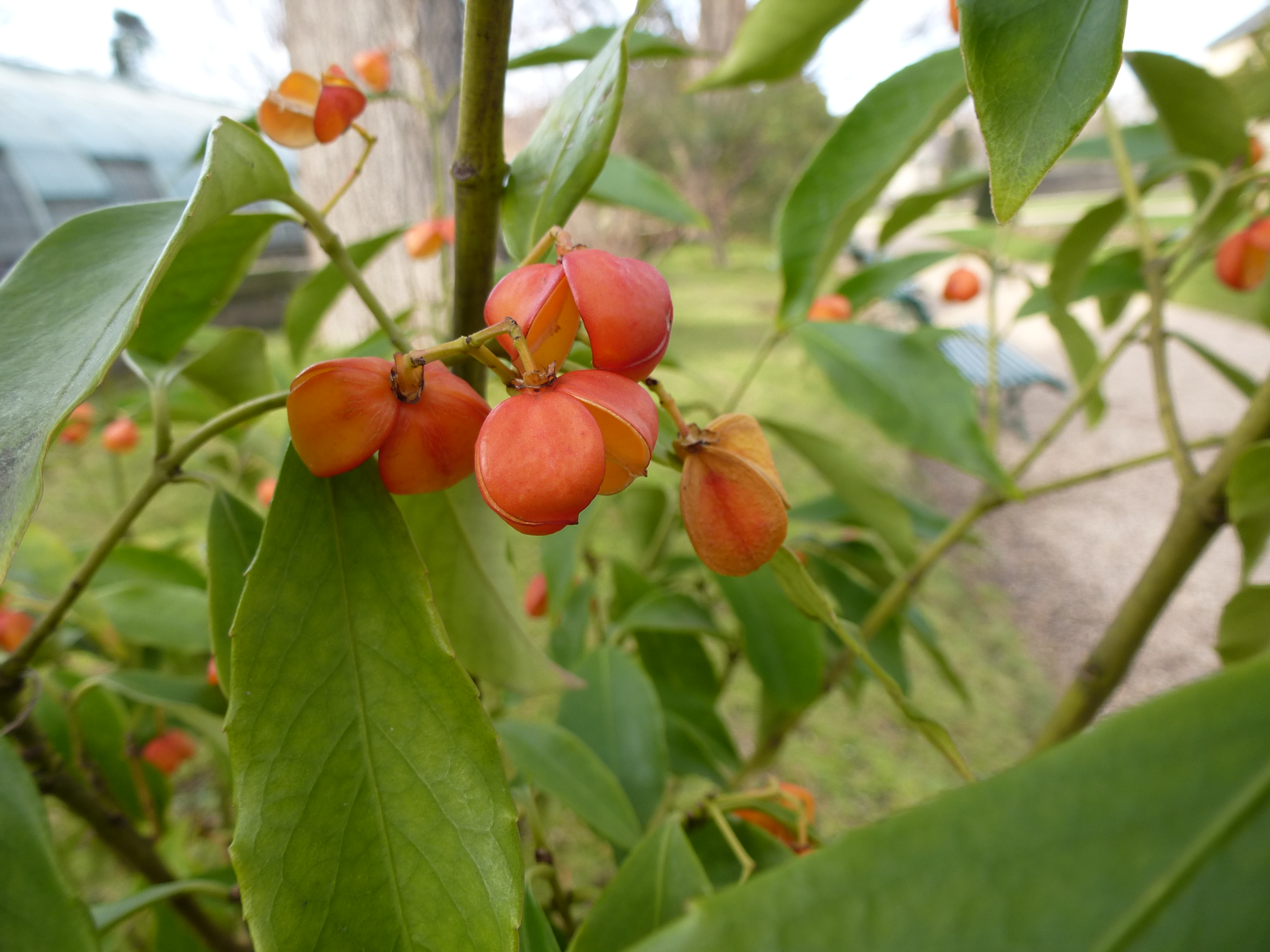
A picture of the Euonymus wilsonii. Photo taken at Jardin Serres d’Ateuil, a botanical garden in Paris, France, during the winter.

Euonymus wilsonii, the Chinese euonymus, is a species of flowering plant in the family Celastraceae. It is native to central and southern China. A large, lax shrub typically 3 to 4 m (10 to 13 ft) tall, it is found in forests and scrublands at elevations from 1,000 to 2,600 m (3,300 to 8,500 ft).

In cultivation it is valued for its spiky yellow fruit that the Royal Horticultural Society says "resemble little yellow hedgehogs dangling in the breeze". It is available from commercial suppliers, but is often confused with Euonymus myrianthus, the many-flowered spindle.
