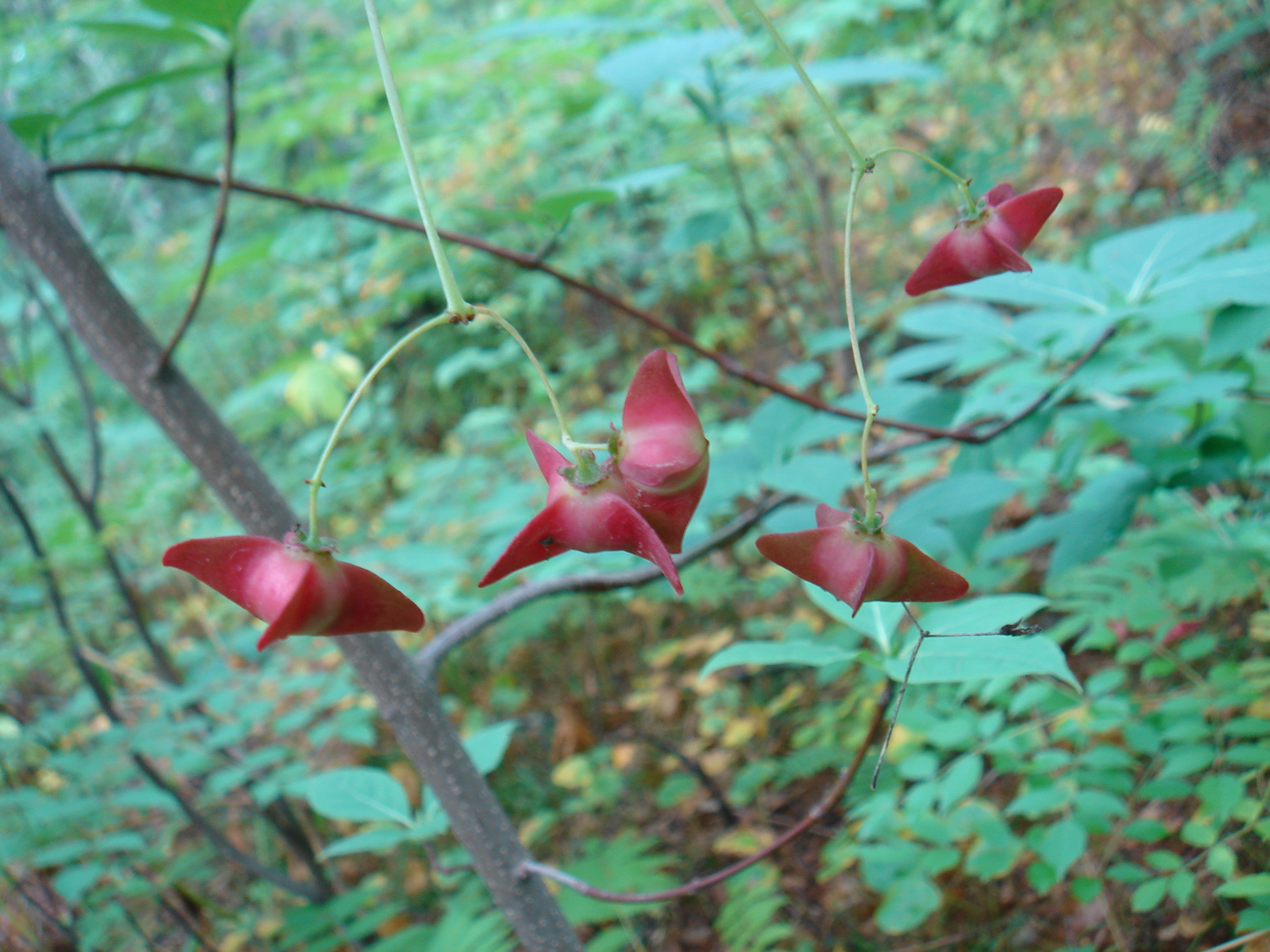
- Fruit
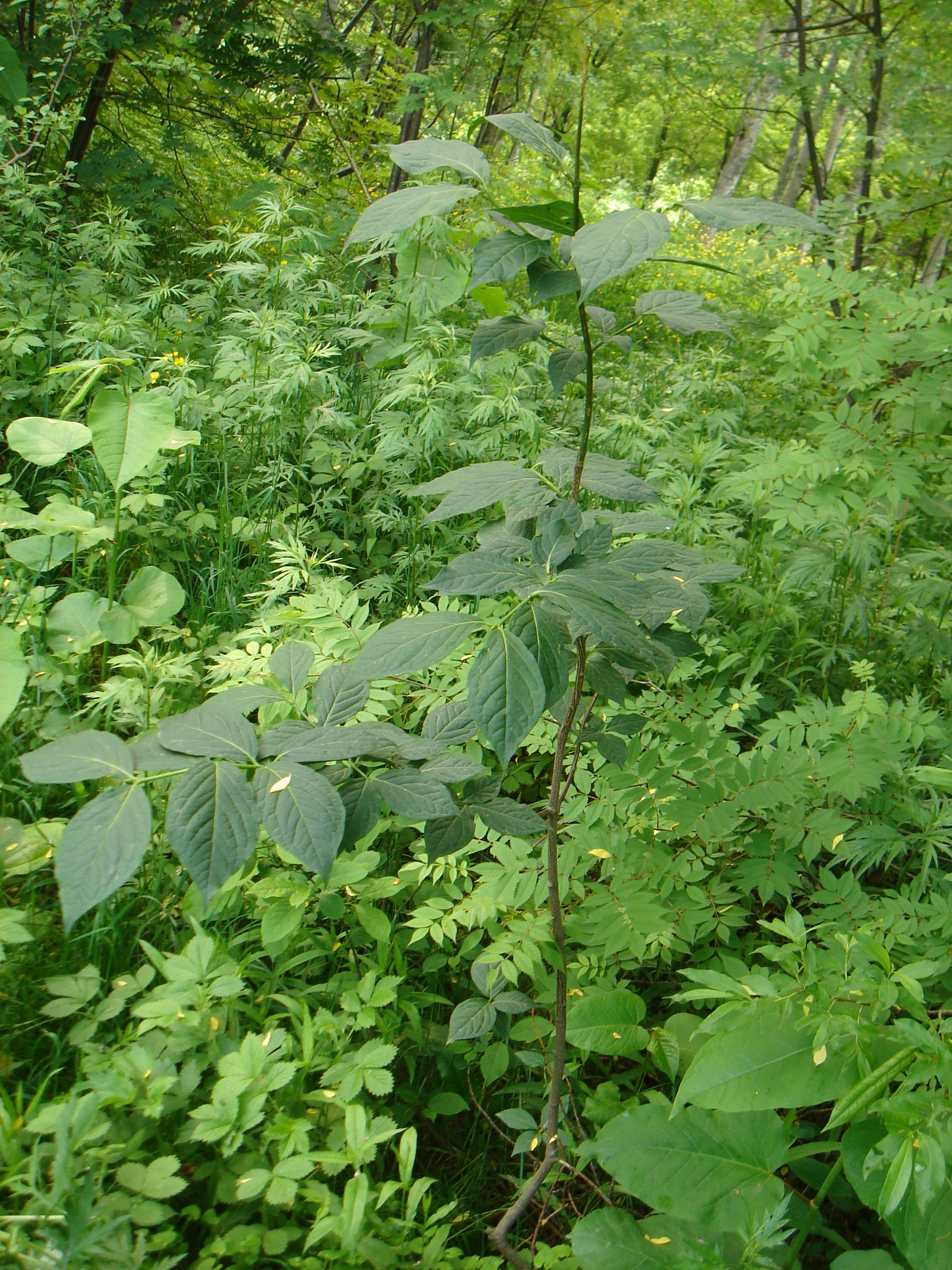
- Sapling

Scientific classification
- Kingdom: Plantae
- Clade: Tracheophytes
- Clade: Angiosperms
- Clade: Eudicots
- Clade: Rosids
- Order: Celastrales
- Family: Celastraceae
- Genus: Euonymus
- Species: E. macropterus

Binomial name
- Euonymus macropterus Rupr.

Synonyms
- Euonymus ussuriensis Maxim.; Kalonymus macroptera (Rupr.) Prokh.; Turibana macroptera (Rupr.) Nakai

= Euonymus macropterus =

Species of plant

Euonymus macropterus is a species of flowering plant in the family Celastraceae. It is native to southern Russian Far East, including Sakhalin and the Kuriles, Manchuria, the Korean peninsula, and Japan. A deciduous shrub reaching 3 m (10 ft) tall and equally wide, it is typically found in mixed evergreen/deciduous forests, and in scrublands, at elevations from 300 to 2,100 m (1,000 to 6,900 ft).

Valued for its pink seed cases that open to expose orange (or bright red) arils, and for its vibrant fall foliage, it is available from commercial suppliers. There appears to be a cultivar, 'Mount Fuji'.

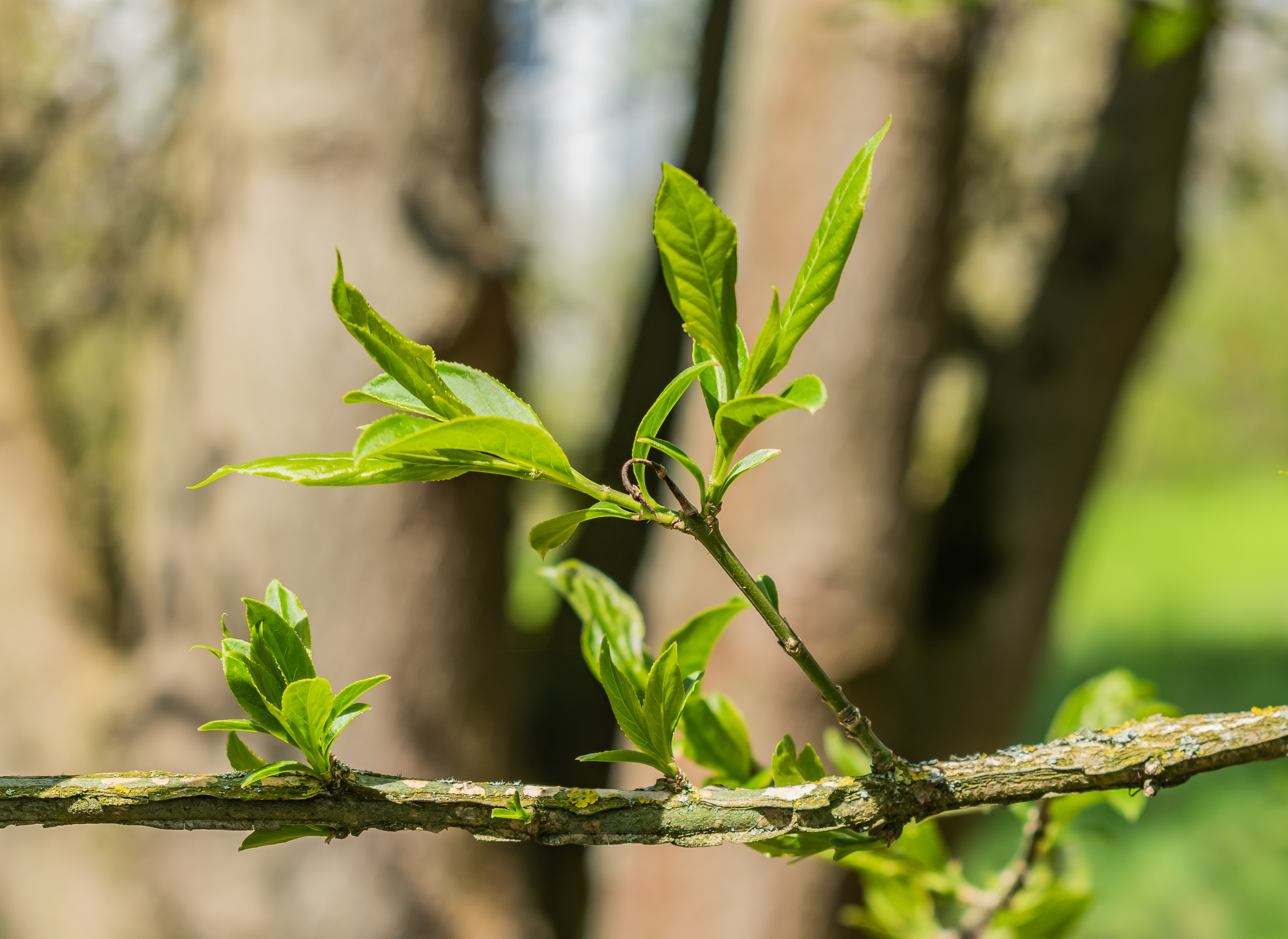
Branch, twig, and leaves
