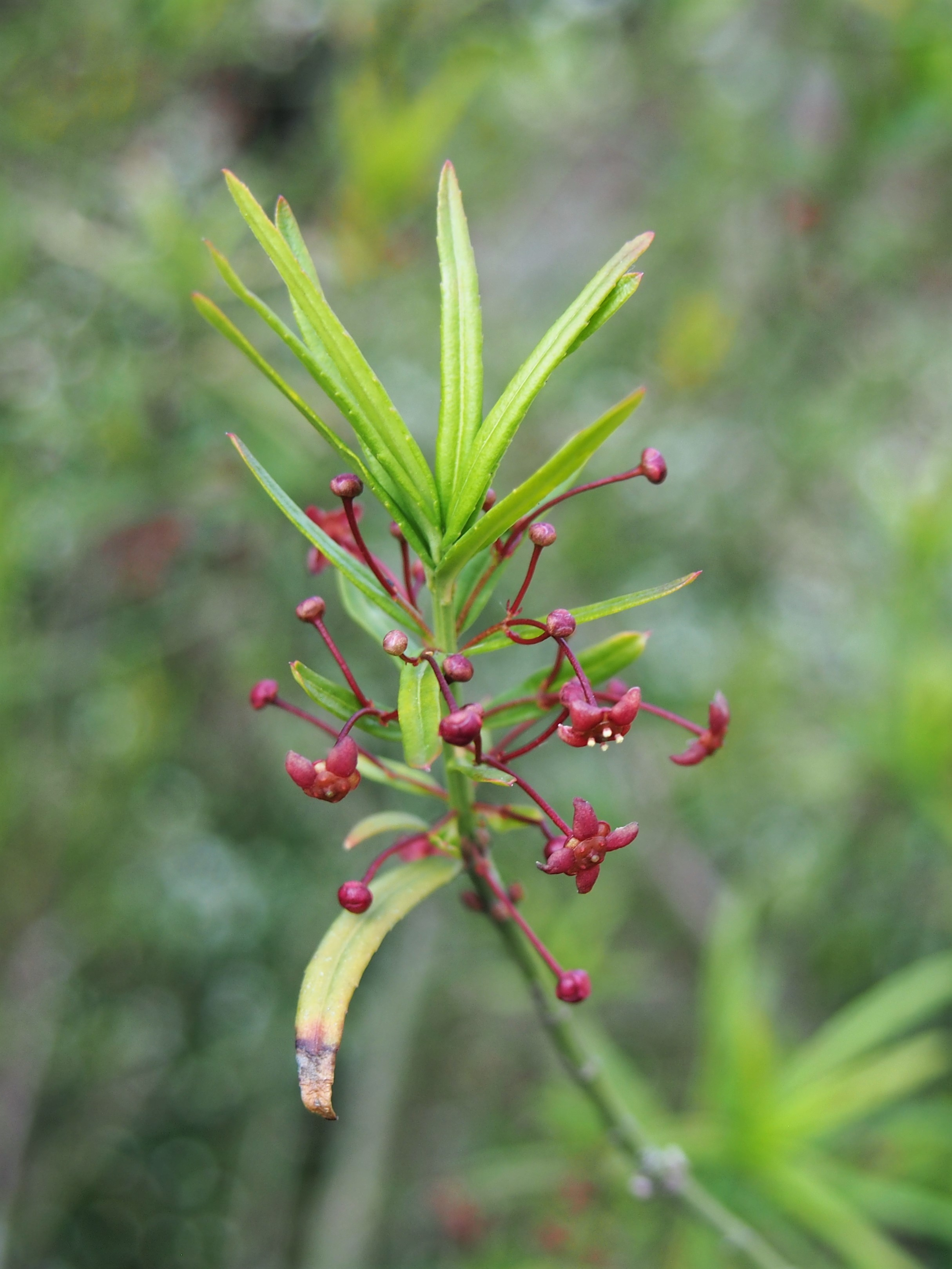
- Flowers
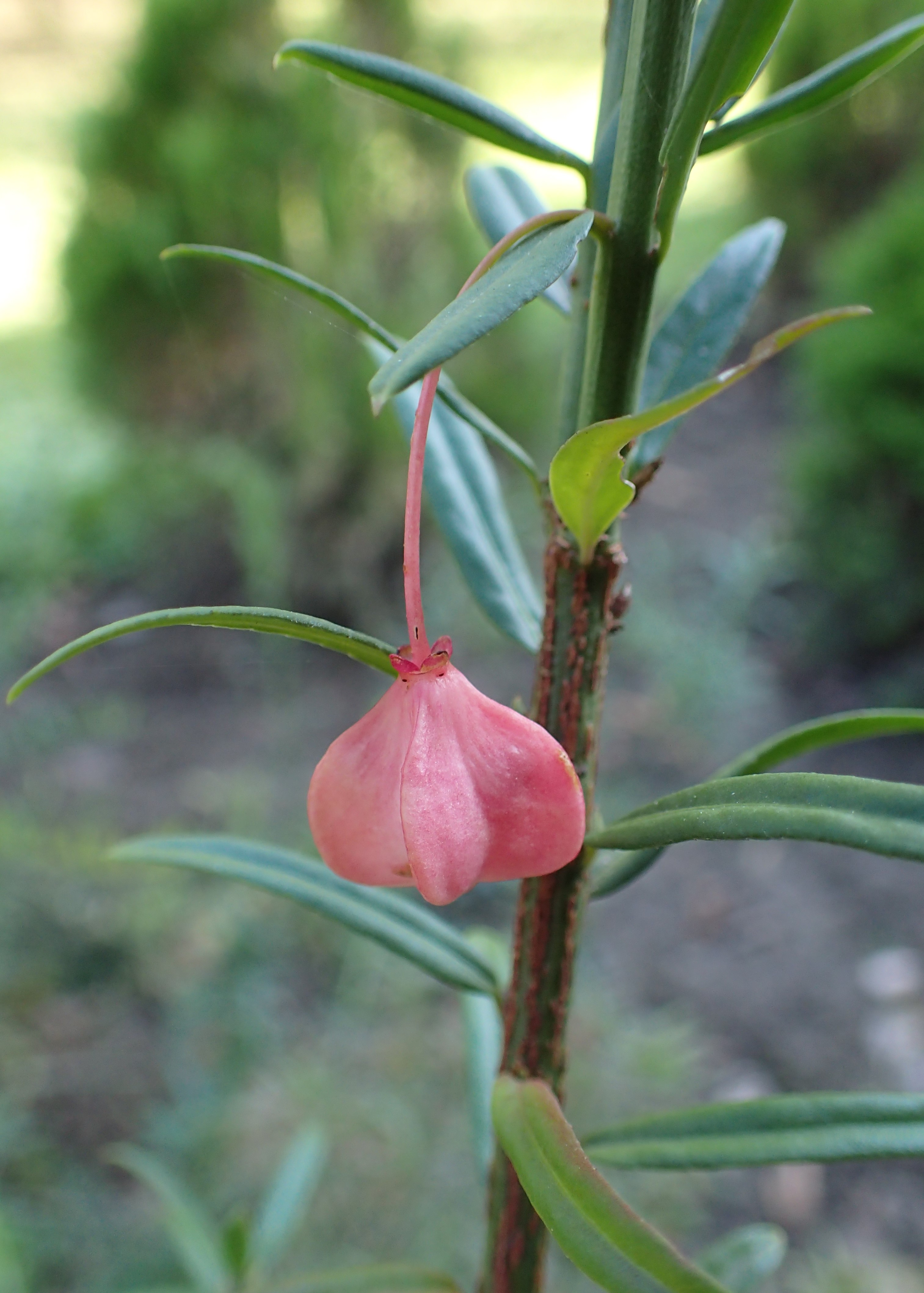
- Fruit, prior to dehiscing

Scientific classification
- Kingdom: Plantae
- Clade: Tracheophytes
- Clade: Angiosperms
- Clade: Eudicots
- Clade: Rosids
- Order: Celastrales
- Family: Celastraceae
- Genus: Euonymus
- Species: E. nanus

Binomial name
- Euonymus nanus M.Bieb.

Synonyms
- List: Euonymus caucasicus Lodd. ex Loudon; Euonymus koopmannii Lauche; Euonymus lilieurii G.Nicholson; Euonymus linifolius Dippel; Euonymus nanus f. turkestanicus Dieck; Euonymus nanus var. turkestanicus (Dieck) Krysht.; Euonymus rosmarinifolius Vis.; Cneorum tricoccon Gueldenst. ex M.Bieb.

= Euonymus nanus =

Species of plant

Euonymus nanus, the dwarf spindle tree, is a species of flowering plant in the family Celastraceae. It is native to the Black Sea region, Central Asia, Mongolia, and northern China, and it has been introduced to Germany. A deciduous or semi-evergreen shrub reaching 1 to 2 m (3 to 7 ft), it is adapted to cold, dry conditions, and is typically found in forests and scrublands high in the mountains. Available from commercial suppliers, its leaves are narrow and resemble those of rosemary.
