= Euonymus glandulosus =

Conservation status
- Conservation Dependent (IUCN 2.3)

Scientific classification
- Kingdom: Plantae
- Clade: Tracheophytes
- Clade: Angiosperms
- Clade: Eudicots
- Clade: Rosids
- Order: Celastrales
- Family: Celastraceae
- Genus: Euonymus
- Species: E. glandulosus

Binomial name
- Euonymus glandulosus (Merr.) Ding Hou

Species of tree

Euonymus glandulosus is a species of plant in the family Celastraceae. It is a tree found in Borneo and the Philippines.
