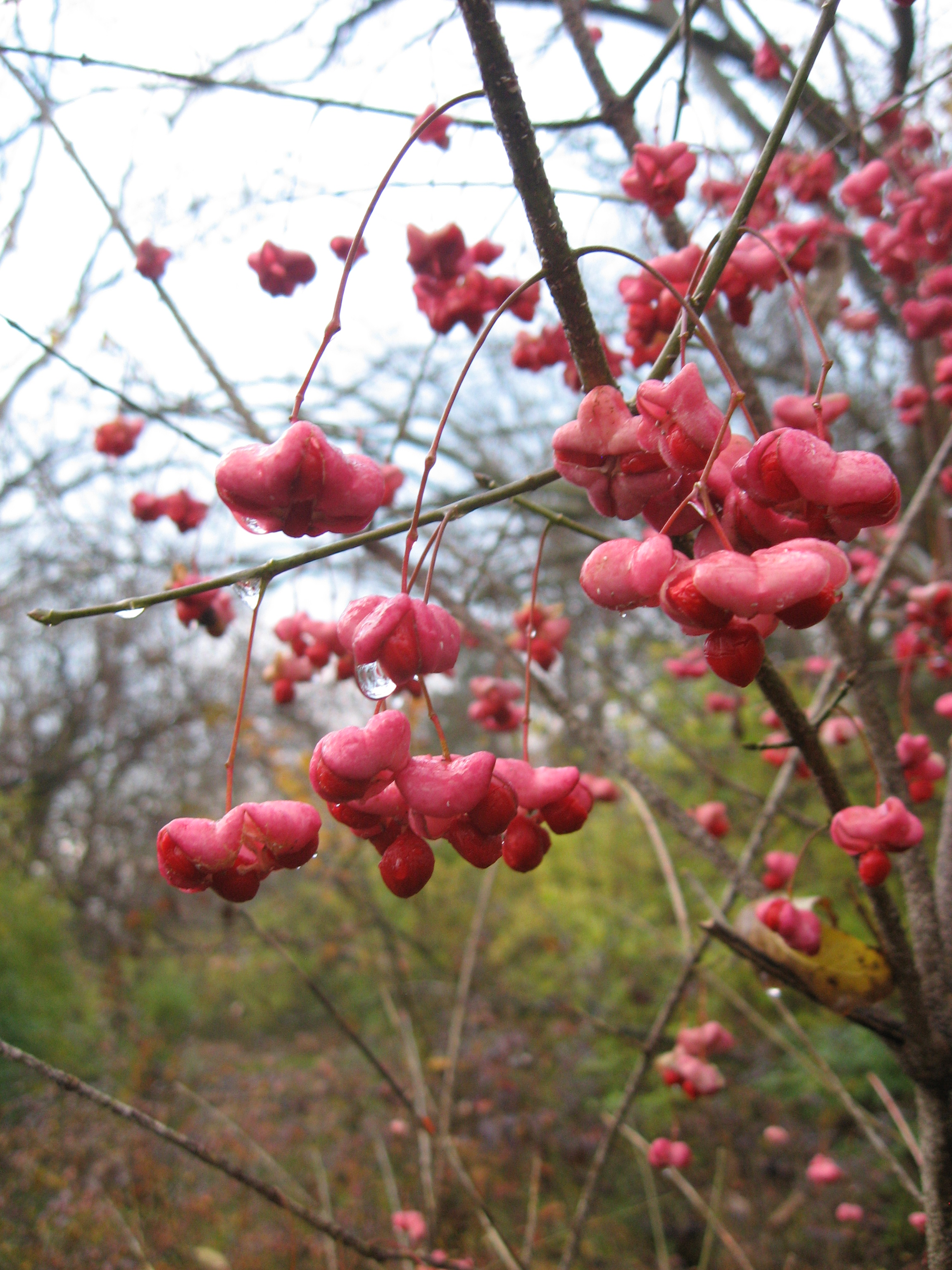

Conservation status
- Least Concern (IUCN 3.1)

Scientific classification
- Kingdom: Plantae
- Clade: Tracheophytes
- Clade: Angiosperms
- Clade: Eudicots
- Clade: Rosids
- Order: Celastrales
- Family: Celastraceae
- Genus: Euonymus
- Species: E. atropurpureus

Binomial name
- Euonymus atropurpureus Jacq.
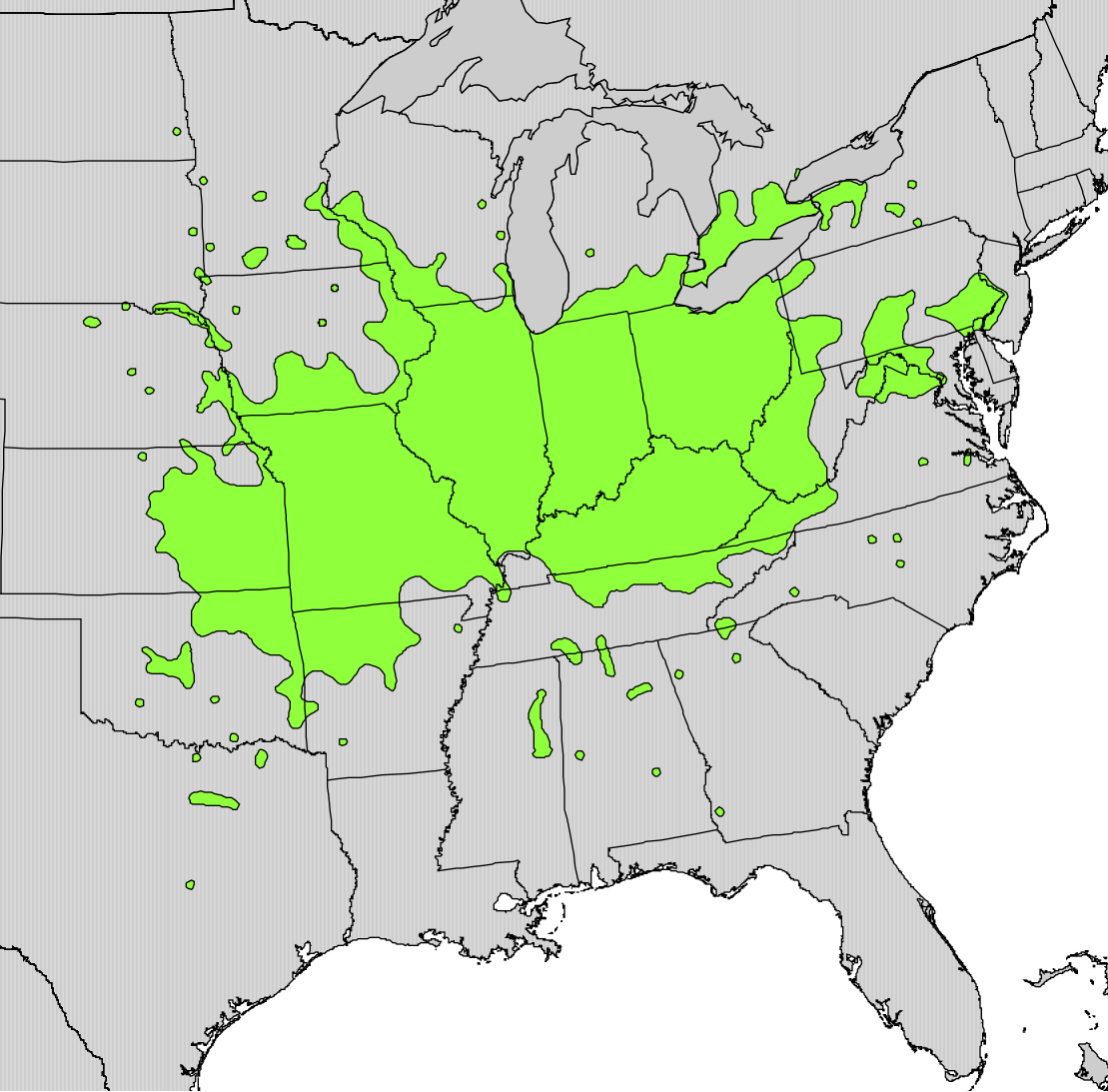
- Generalized natural range of Euonymus atropurpureus

= Euonymus atropurpureus =

Species of flowering plant

Euonymus atropurpureus is a species of shrub in the genus Euonymus and the larger bittersweet family. It has the common names American wahoo, eastern wahoo, burning bush and hearts bursting with love. It is native to eastern North America.

== Distribution and habitat ==
This species is primarily found in the Midwestern United States, but its range extends from southern Ontario south to northern Florida and Texas. It grows in low meadows, open slopes, open woodland, stream banks and prairies, in moist soils, especially thickets, valleys, and forest edges.

== Description ==
It is a deciduous shrub growing to 8 m (26 ft) tall, with stems up to 10 cm (3.9 in) diameter. The bark is gray, smooth, and lightly fissured. The twigs are dark purplish-brown, slender, sometimes four-angled or slightly winged. The leaves are opposite, elliptical, 8.5–11.3 cm (3.3–4.4 in) long and 3.2–5.5 cm (1.3–2.2 in) broad, abruptly long pointed at the tip, and with a finely serrated margin; they are green above, paler and often with fine hairs beneath, and turn bright red in the fall. The flowers are bisexual, 10–12 mm (0.39–0.47 in) diameter, with four greenish sepals, four brown-purple petals and four stamens; they are produced in small axillary cymes. The fruit is a smooth reddish to pink four-lobed (sometimes one or more of the lobes abort) capsule, up to 17 mm (0.67 in) diameter, each lobe containing a single seed, orange with a fleshy red aril.

== Uses ==
The fruit is poisonous to humans, but is eaten by several species of birds, which disperse the seeds in their droppings. It is used medicinally in both the United States and southeastern Canada. The powdered bark was used by Native Americans and pioneers as a purgative.
