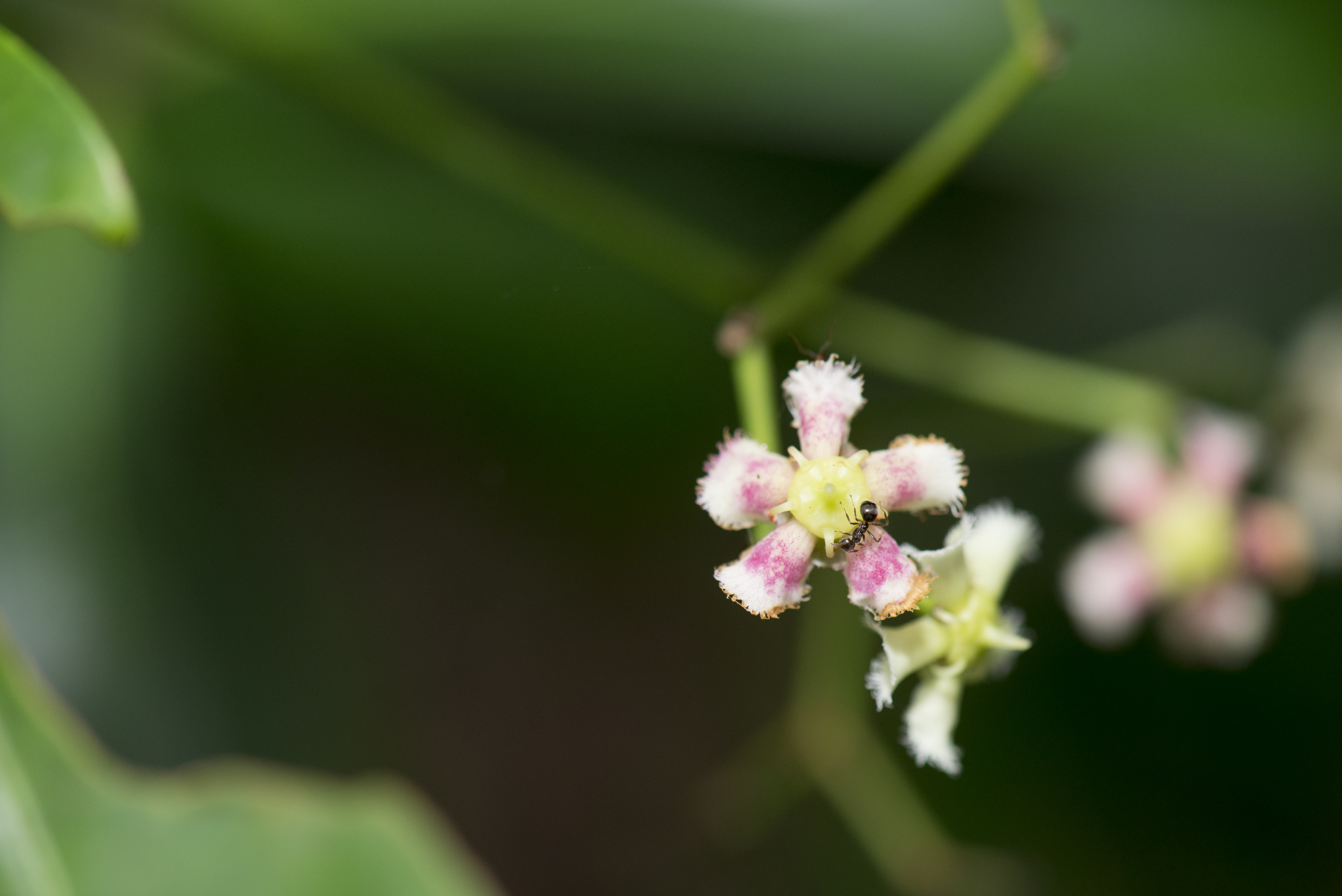

Conservation status
- Least Concern (IUCN 2.3)

Scientific classification
- Kingdom: Plantae
- Clade: Tracheophytes
- Clade: Angiosperms
- Clade: Eudicots
- Clade: Rosids
- Order: Celastrales
- Family: Celastraceae
- Genus: Euonymus
- Species: E. cochinchinensis

Binomial name
- Euonymus cochinchinensis Pierre

Synonyms
- Euonymus colonoides Craib; Euonymus oliganthus Merr.; Euonymus pahangensis Ridl.; Euonymus philippinensis Merr.; Euonymus similis Craib; Glyptopetalum scortechinii King; Sphaerodiscus cochinchinensis (Pierre) Nakai

= Euonymus cochinchinensis =

Species of tree

Euonymus cochinchinensis is a tree of tropical Asia in the staff vine family Celastraceae. The specific epithet cochinchinensis refers to the species being native to Indo-China.

== Description ==
Euonymus cochinchinensis grows as a small tree up to 12 metres (40 ft) tall. The flowers are greenish yellow. The fruits are obovoid to roundish in shape.

== Distribution and habitat ==
Euonymus cochinchinensis grows naturally in Hainan, Taiwan, Indo-China, Malesia and Papua New Guinea. Its habitat is coastal forests.
