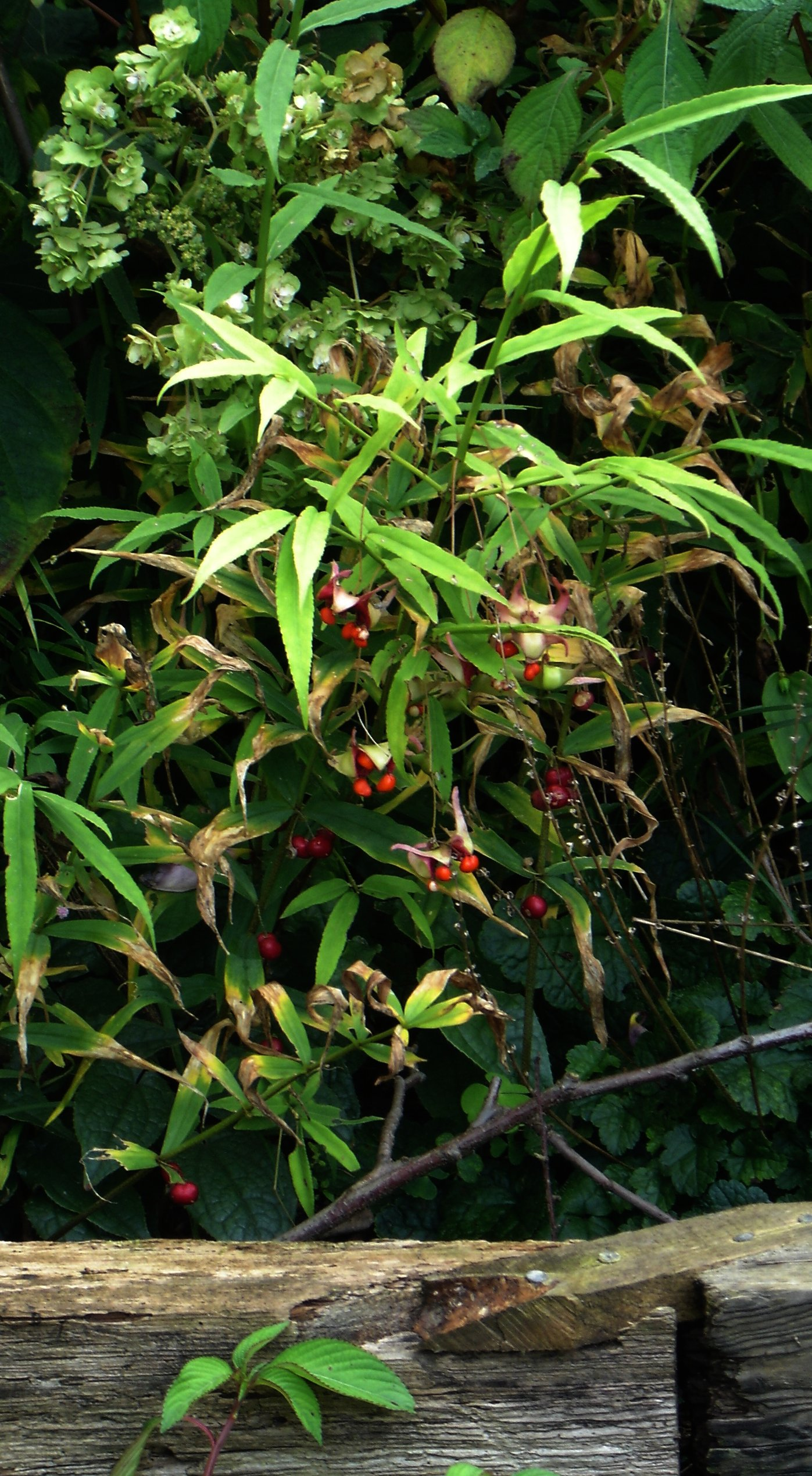

Scientific classification
- Kingdom: Plantae
- Clade: Embryophytes
- Clade: Tracheophytes
- Clade: Spermatophytes
- Clade: Angiosperms
- Clade: Eudicots
- Clade: Rosids
- Order: Celastrales
- Family: Celastraceae
- Genus: Euonymus
- Species: E. cornutus

Binomial name
- Euonymus cornutus Hemsl.

Synonyms
- List: Acnistus cornutus (Griseb.) Griseb.; Euonymus cornutoides Loes.; Euonymus frigidus var. cornutoides (Loes.) C.Y.Cheng; Euonymus stenophyllus J.W.Ren

= Euonymus cornutus =

Species of flowering plant

Euonymus cornutus is a species of flowering plant in the genus Euonymus, native to Tibet, central China and Myanmar. Its putative variety Euonymus cornutus var. quinquecornutus, called the five‑horned spindle, has gained the Royal Horticultural Society's Award of Garden Merit.
