= Euonymus acuminifolius =

Scientific classification
- Kingdom: Plantae
- Clade: Tracheophytes
- Clade: Angiosperms
- Clade: Eudicots
- Clade: Rosids
- Order: Celastrales
- Family: Celastraceae
- Genus: Euonymus
- Species: E. acuminifolius

Binomial name
- Euonymus acuminifolius Blakelock

Synonyms
- Euonymus acuminifolius var. borneensis Blakelock

Species of flowering plant

Euonymus acuminifolius is a plant in the family Celastraceae. The specific epithet acuminifolius is from the Latin meaning 'long-pointed leaves'.

== Description ==
Euonymus acuminifolius grows as a shrub up to 4 metres (10 ft) tall. The flowers are purplish-red. The obcordate fruits measure up to 1.7 cm (1 in) long.

== Distribution and habitat ==
Euonymus acuminifolius grows naturally in Sumatra, Borneo and Sulawesi. Its habitat is montane forest at around 2,700 metres (9,000 ft) altitude.
