= Euonymus lanceifolia =

Conservation status
- Vulnerable (IUCN 2.3)

Scientific classification
- Kingdom: Plantae
- Clade: Tracheophytes
- Clade: Angiosperms
- Clade: Eudicots
- Clade: Rosids
- Order: Celastrales
- Family: Celastraceae
- Genus: Euonymus
- Species: E. lanceifolia

Binomial name
- Euonymus lanceifolia Loes.

Species of plant

Euonymus lanceifolia is a species of plant in the family Celastraceae. It is endemic to China.
