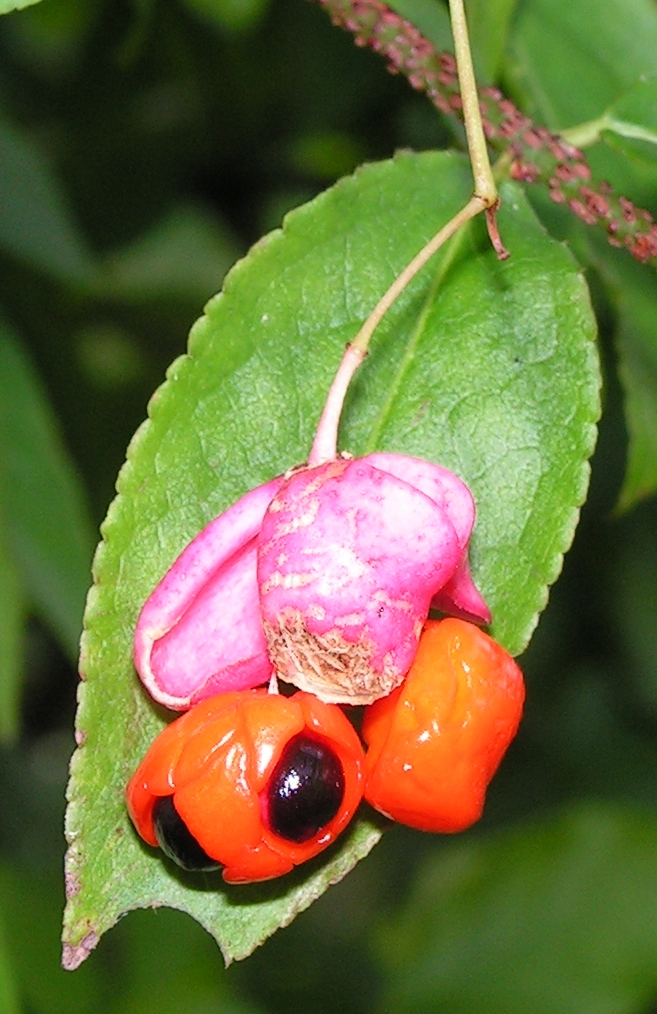

Scientific classification
- Kingdom: Plantae
- Clade: Tracheophytes
- Clade: Angiosperms
- Clade: Eudicots
- Clade: Rosids
- Order: Celastrales
- Family: Celastraceae
- Genus: Euonymus
- Species: E. verrucosus

Binomial name
- Euonymus verrucosus Scop.

= Euonymus verrucosus =

Species of flowering plant

Euonymus verrucosus is a species of flowering plant belonging to the family Celastraceae.

Its native range is Central Europe to Central Japan.
