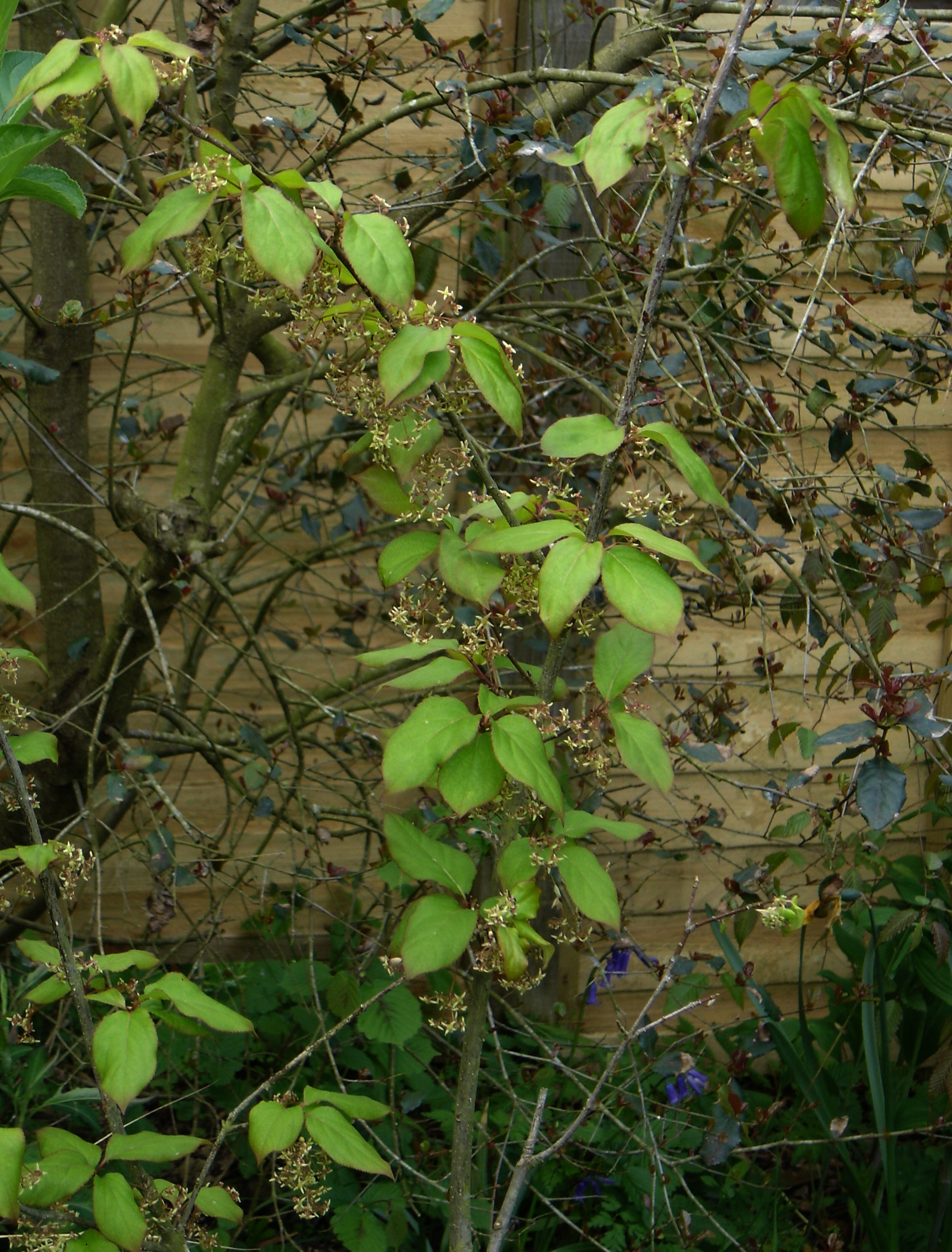
- In bloom

Conservation status
- Least Concern (IUCN 3.1)

Scientific classification
- Kingdom: Plantae
- Clade: Tracheophytes
- Clade: Angiosperms
- Clade: Eudicots
- Clade: Rosids
- Order: Celastrales
- Family: Celastraceae
- Genus: Euonymus
- Species: E. sanguineus

Binomial name
- Euonymus sanguineus Loes.

Synonyms
- List: Euonymus monbeigii W.W.Sm.; Euonymus sanguineus var. brevipedunculatus Loes.; Euonymus sanguineus var. camptoneurus Loes.; Euonymus sanguineus var. lanceolatus S.Z.Qu & Y.H.He; Euonymus sanguineus var. laxus Loes. ex Diels; Euonymus sanguineus var. orthoneurus Loes.; Euonymus sanguineus var. pachyphyllus Pamp.; Euonymus sanguineus var. paedidus L.M.Wang

= Euonymus sanguineus =

Species of plant

Euonymus sanguineus, the blood red spindle, is a species of flowering plant in the family Celastraceae. It is native to Nepal, and to nearly all of China except Xinjiang, Manchuria, and Hainan. A deciduous shrub reaching 3 to 5 m (10 to 16 ft), it is typically found in scrublands and mixed evergreen/deciduous forests, at elevations from 1,800 to 3,700 m (6,000 to 12,000 ft). It may be available from specialty suppliers.
