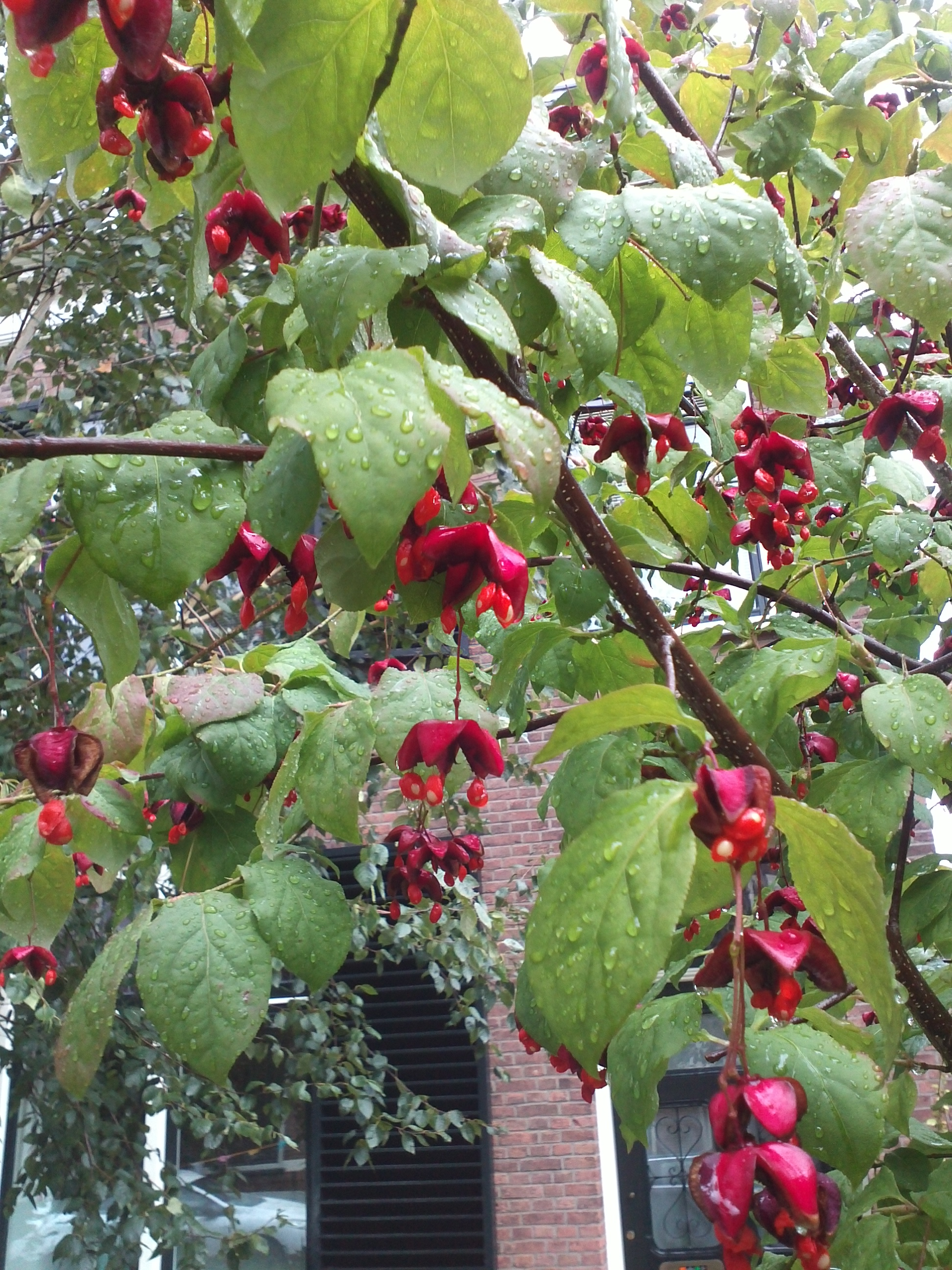

Scientific classification
- Kingdom: Plantae
- Clade: Tracheophytes
- Clade: Angiosperms
- Clade: Eudicots
- Clade: Rosids
- Order: Celastrales
- Family: Celastraceae
- Genus: Euonymus
- Species: E. sachalinensis

Binomial name
- Euonymus sachalinensis (F.Schmidt) Maxim.

Synonyms
- Euonymus planipes

= Euonymus sachalinensis =

Species of flowering plant

Euonymus sachalinensis (syn. Euonymus planipes), the flat-stalked spindle, is a species of flowering plant in the family Celastraceae, native to Japan, China, Korea, and the Island of Sakhalin (whence the specific epithet sachalinensis). Growing to 2.5 m (8.2 ft) tall and broad, it is a deciduous shrub notable for its leaves turning red in autumn, and its red fruit which splits open to reveal orange seeds. Exceptional specimens, such as the one in the Hørsholm Arboretum, Copenhagen University, can become trees up to 4 m (13 ft) in height.

This plant is cultivated as an ornamental subject. The cultivar 'Sancho' which is more free-flowering than its parent, is a recipient of the Royal Horticultural Society's Award of Garden Merit.

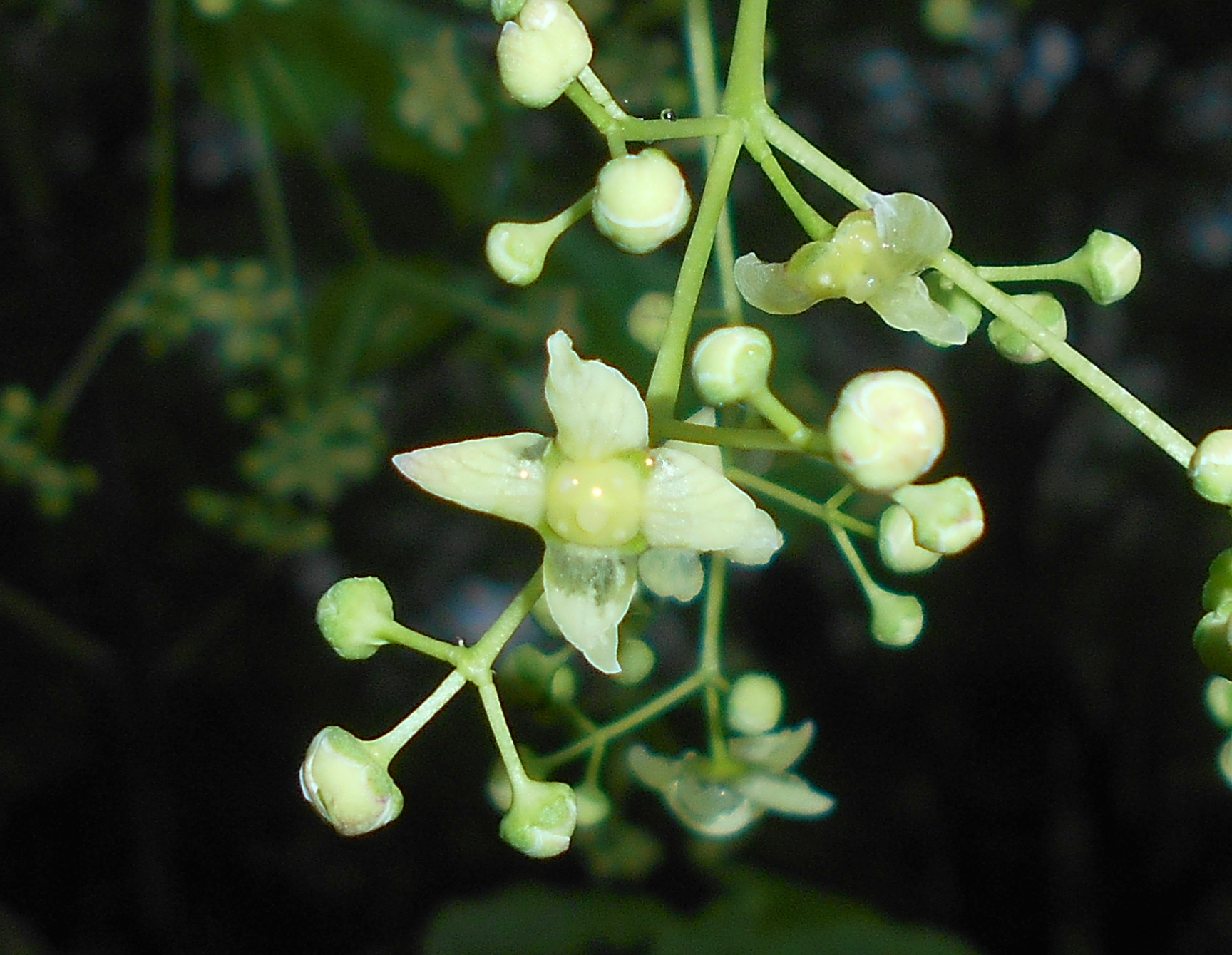
Flowers and unripe fruit
