= Euonymus castaneifolius =

Scientific classification
- Kingdom: Plantae
- Clade: Tracheophytes
- Clade: Angiosperms
- Clade: Eudicots
- Clade: Rosids
- Order: Celastrales
- Family: Celastraceae
- Genus: Euonymus
- Species: E. castaneifolius

Binomial name
- Euonymus castaneifolius Ridl.

Synonyms
- Euonymus moultonii Ridl.

Species of tree

Euonymus castaneifolius is a tree in the family Celastraceae. The specific epithet castaneifolius is from the Latin meaning 'chestnut-coloured leaves'.

== Description ==
Euonymus castaneifolius grows up to 12 metres (40 ft) tall with a trunk diameter of up to 10 centimetres (4 in). The smooth bark is grey-brown. The flowers are white. The obovoid fruits ripen red and measure up to 1.8 cm (1 in) long.

== Distribution and habitat ==
Euonymus castaneifolius grows naturally in Sumatra and Borneo. Its habitat is lowland mixed dipterocarp to montane forests from sea-level to 2,700 metres (9,000 ft) altitude.
