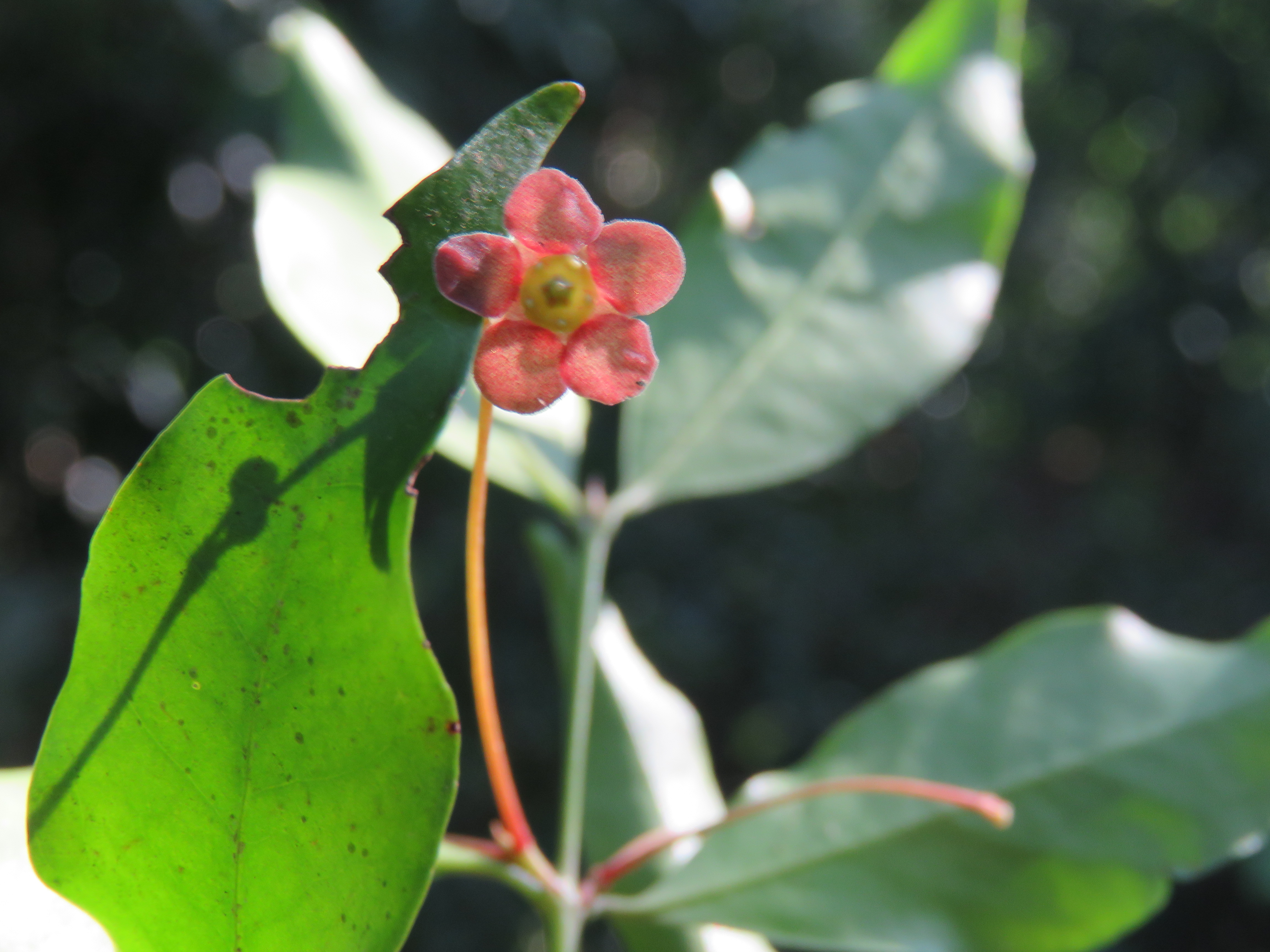

Conservation status
- Vulnerable (IUCN 2.3)

Scientific classification
- Kingdom: Plantae
- Clade: Tracheophytes
- Clade: Angiosperms
- Clade: Eudicots
- Clade: Rosids
- Order: Celastrales
- Family: Celastraceae
- Genus: Euonymus
- Species: E. angulatus

Binomial name
- Euonymus angulatus Wight

= Euonymus angulatus =

Species of flowering plant

Euonymus angulatus is a species of tree in the family Celastraceae. They can grow up to 5 metres (16 ft) tall and have dull purple flowers. They grow in medium elevation evergreen forests in the Western Ghats between 800 and 1,400 metres (2,600 and 4,600 ft). It is endemic to India, where it is known from Karnataka, Kerala, and Tamil Nadu. It is threatened by habitat loss.

The species was first described by Robert Wight in 1846.
