= Euonymus dichotomus =

Scientific classification
- Kingdom: Plantae
- Clade: Tracheophytes
- Clade: Angiosperms
- Clade: Eudicots
- Clade: Rosids
- Order: Celastrales
- Family: Celastraceae
- Genus: Euonymus
- Species: E. dichotomus

Binomial name
- Euonymus dichotomus B.Heyne ex Wall.

Synonyms
- Euonymus thwaitesii M.A.Lawson

Species of flowering plant

Euonymus dichotomus is a species of flowering plant in the family Celastraceae, native to Sri Lanka and southern India.
