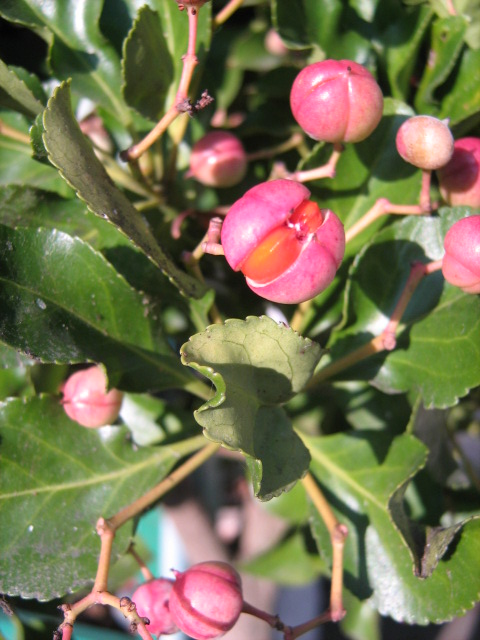

Conservation status
- Least Concern (IUCN 3.1)

Scientific classification
- Kingdom: Plantae
- Clade: Tracheophytes
- Clade: Angiosperms
- Clade: Eudicots
- Clade: Rosids
- Order: Celastrales
- Family: Celastraceae
- Genus: Euonymus
- Species: E. acanthocarpus

Binomial name
- Euonymus acanthocarpus Franchet

Synonyms
- Euonymus laxus Euonymus longipes Euonymus tengyuehensis

= Euonymus acanthocarpus =

Species of flowering plant

Euonymus acanthocarpus is a species of flowering plant in the family Celastraceae. It is endemic to China. It has a scattered distribution in forest habitat.

This species is a shrub which can reach 8 meters tall, but is usually not more than 2 or 3. It has leathery leaves and inflorescences of many flowers. The flower is yellow-green and 6 to 8 millimeters wide. The fruit capsule is covered in prickles and contains seeds with orange arils.
