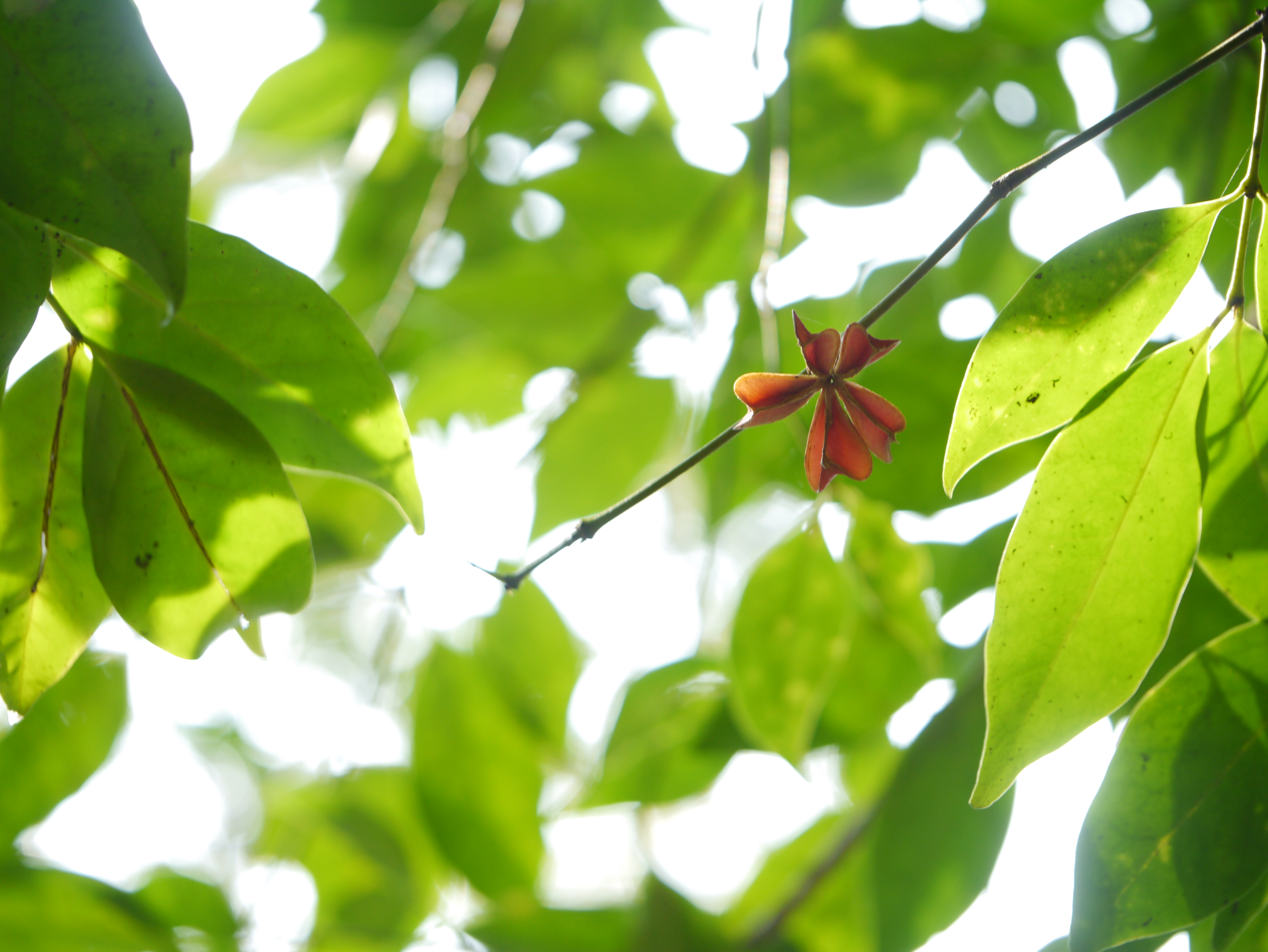

Conservation status
- Least Concern (IUCN 3.1)

Scientific classification
- Kingdom: Plantae
- Clade: Tracheophytes
- Clade: Angiosperms
- Clade: Eudicots
- Clade: Rosids
- Order: Celastrales
- Family: Celastraceae
- Genus: Euonymus
- Species: E. indicus

Binomial name
- Euonymus indicus B.Heyne ex Wall.

Synonyms
- List: Euonymus bancanus Miq.; Euonymus coriaceus Ridl.; Euonymus elmeri Merr.; Euonymus goughii Wight; Euonymus horsfieldii Turcz.; Euonymus javanicus Blume; Euonymus micropetalus Ridl.; Euonymus sphaerocarpus Hassk.; Euonymus sumatranus Miq.; Euonymus timorensis Zipp. ex Span.

= Euonymus indicus =

Species of plant

Euonymus indicus, the Indian spindle tree, is a small evergreen understorey tree in the family Celastraceae. It can grow up to a height of 13 m and girth up to 1 m.

== Description ==
The leaves are simple and show opposite phyllotaxy. The petiole length is about 0.5-0.8 cm and lamina size: 5-10 × 2-4.5 cm. Leaf shape is elliptic and leaf apex is acuminate. Four to six pairs of secondary nerves can be seen. Flowers are seen in three flowered axillary cymes. Fruit is pear shaped, 2.5 cm long, three valved, and scarlet when mature.

The bark of the tree is corky and blaze is reddish in colour. The branchlets are subterete and glabrous.

== Distribution ==
Euonymus indicus is native to much of tropical Asia, from India to both mainland and maritime Southeast Asia. In India, the tree is seen in the evergreen forests of Western Ghats from Amboli to Southern Kerala. Its elevation range is from 150 m to 1100 m.
