= Euonymus frigidus =

Conservation status
- Least Concern (IUCN 3.1)

Scientific classification
- Kingdom: Plantae
- Clade: Tracheophytes
- Clade: Angiosperms
- Clade: Eudicots
- Clade: Rosids
- Order: Celastrales
- Family: Celastraceae
- Genus: Euonymus
- Species: E. frigidus

Binomial name
- Euonymus frigidus Wall.

Synonyms
- List: Euonymus amygdalifolius Franch.; Euonymus assamicus Blakelock; Euonymus austrotibetanus Y.R.Li; Euonymus burmanicus Merr.; Euonymus ceratophorus Loes.; Euonymus crinitus Pamp.; Euonymus dasydictyon Loes. & Rehder; Euonymus porphyreus Loes.; Euonymus pygmaeus W.W.Sm.; Euonymus roseoperulatus Loes.; Euonymus taliensis Loes.; Euonymus wardii W.W.Sm.

Species of flowering plant

Euonymus frigidus (synonym Euonymus assamicus) is a species of plant in the family Celastraceae. It is native to China, the Himalayas, Assam and Myanmar.
