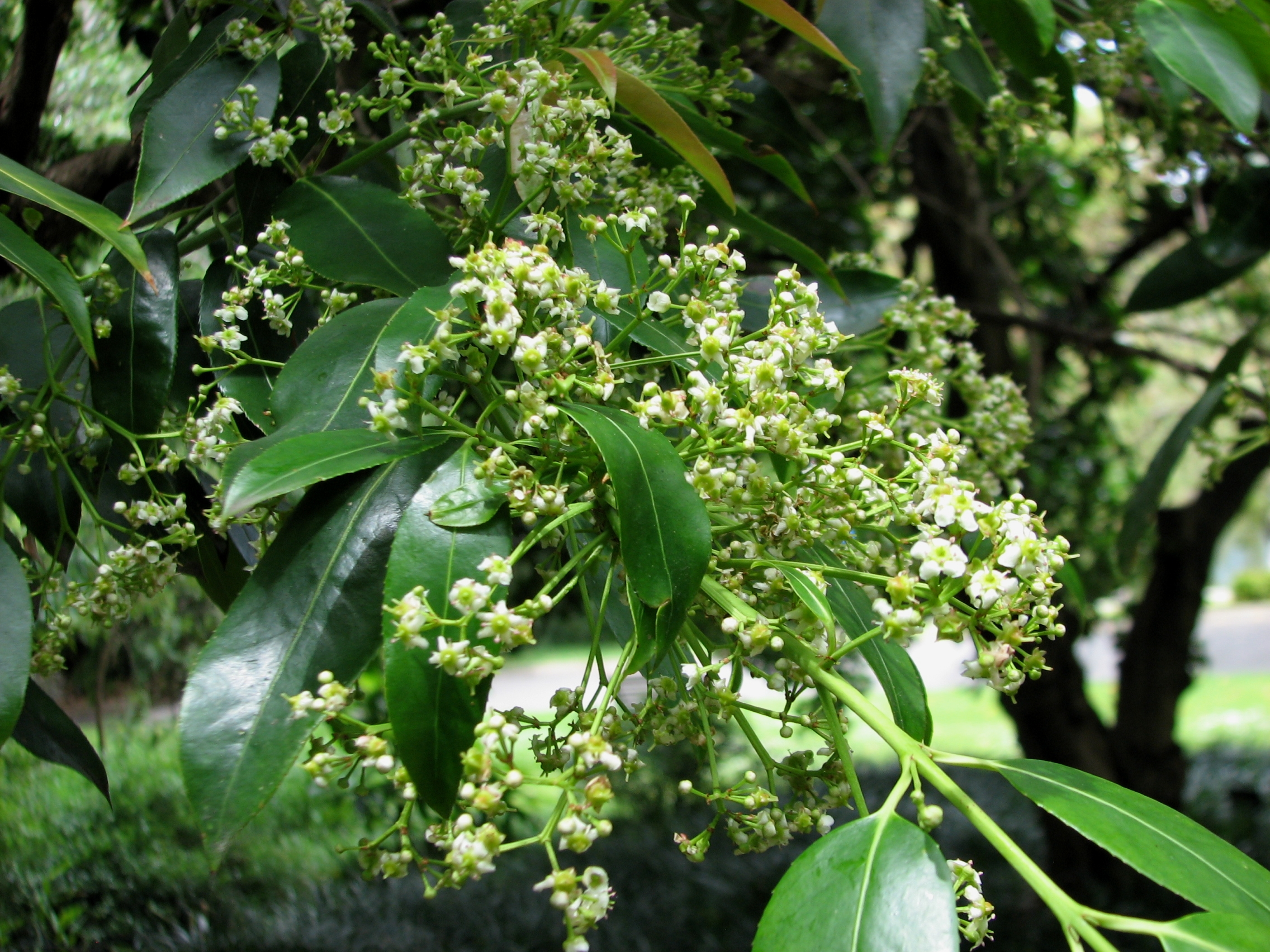

Scientific classification
- Kingdom: Plantae
- Clade: Tracheophytes
- Clade: Angiosperms
- Clade: Eudicots
- Clade: Rosids
- Order: Celastrales
- Family: Celastraceae
- Genus: Euonymus
- Species: E. lucidus

Binomial name
- Euonymus lucidus D.Don

Synonyms
- Euonymus pendulus Wall.; Pragmatropa pendula (Wall.) Pierre; Vyenomus pendula (Wall.) C.Presl

= Euonymus lucidus =

Species of flowering plant

Euonymus lucidus is a species of Euonymus native to the Himalaya region, from Pakistan east to northern Assam and Myanmar.

It is an evergreen shrub or small tree, which grows to be 6–10 m tall with a dense, spreading crown and corky grey bark. The leaves are glossy green and often bronze-red when newly opened. They are lanceolate to narrow ovate, 5–12 cm long and 2–3 cm broad, with a serrated margin. The flowers are small, with four white petals approximately 4 mm long. The fruit produced by the plant are three or four-lobed berry-like capsules which are 15 mm broad. Each contains three or four seeds surrounded by fleshy orange-red arils.
