= Euonymus serratifolius =

Conservation status
- Endangered (IUCN 2.3)

Scientific classification
- Kingdom: Plantae
- Clade: Tracheophytes
- Clade: Angiosperms
- Clade: Eudicots
- Clade: Rosids
- Order: Celastrales
- Family: Celastraceae
- Genus: Euonymus
- Species: E. serratifolius

Binomial name
- Euonymus serratifolius Bedd.

Species of flowering plant

Euonymus serratifolius is a species of plant in the family Celastraceae. It is a small understory tree endemic to Kerala and Tamil Nadu in India, where it grows in the southern Western Ghats (Agastyamalai Hills and the Wyanad area).
