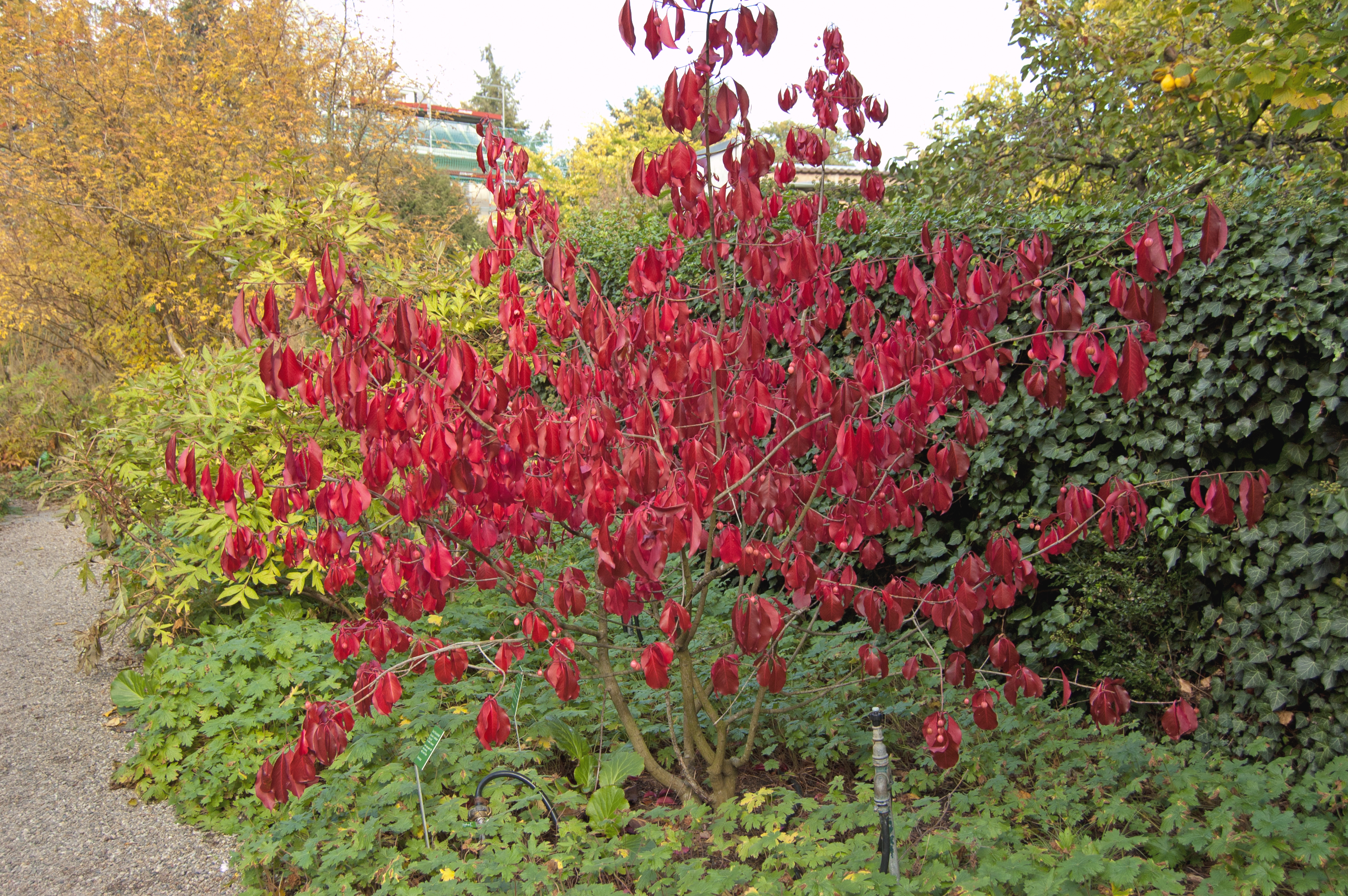

Conservation status
- Least Concern (IUCN 2.3)

Scientific classification
- Kingdom: Plantae
- Clade: Tracheophytes
- Clade: Angiosperms
- Clade: Eudicots
- Clade: Rosids
- Order: Celastrales
- Family: Celastraceae
- Genus: Euonymus
- Species: E. grandiflorus

Binomial name
- Euonymus grandiflorus Wallich

= Euonymus grandiflorus =

Species of flowering plant

Euonymus grandiflorus is a species of plant in the family Celastraceae. It is found in China, Myanmar, and Nepal.
