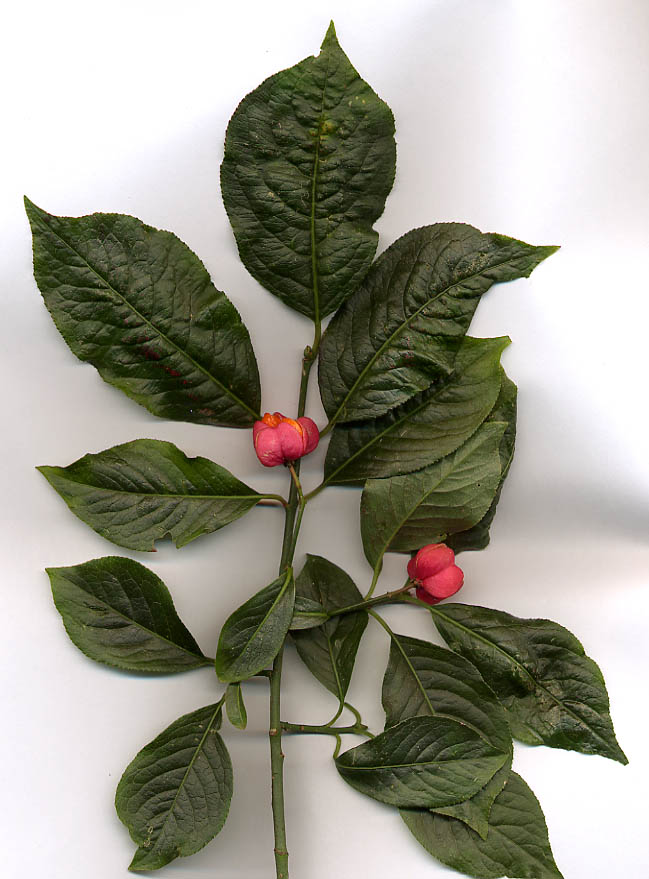
- Euonymus europaeus foliage and fruit

Scientific classification
- Kingdom: Plantae
- Clade: Embryophytes
- Clade: Tracheophytes
- Clade: Spermatophytes
- Clade: Angiosperms
- Clade: Eudicots
- Clade: Rosids
- Order: Celastrales
- Family: Celastraceae
- Genus: Euonymus; L.

Diversity
- c. 140 species

Synonyms
- Genitia Nakai; Kalonymus (Beck) Prokh.; Masakia (Nakai) Nakai; Melanocarya Turcz.; Pragmatropa Pierre; Pragmotessara Pierre; Quadripterygium Tardieu; Sphaerodiscus Nakai; Turibana (Nakai) Nakai; Vyenomus C.Presl

= Euonymus =

Genus of plants

Euonymus /juːˈɒnɪməs/ is a genus of flowering plants in the staff vine family Celastraceae. Common names vary widely among different species and between different English-speaking countries, but include spindle (or spindle tree), burning-bush, strawberry-bush, wahoo, wintercreeper, or simply euonymus. It has about 140 species of deciduous and evergreen shrubs, small trees and lianas. They are mostly native to East Asia, extending to the Himalayas, and they are also distributed in Europe, Australasia, North America, and Madagascar. Fifty species are endemic to China.

== Description ==
The inconspicuous flowers occur in small groups, and can be green, yellow, pink or maroon in color depending on species. The leaves are opposite (rarely alternate) and simple ovoid, typically 2–15 cm long, and usually with a finely serrated margin. The fruit is a pink or white four- or five-valved pod-like berry, which splits open to reveal the fleshy-coated orange or red seeds.

The seeds are eaten by frugivorous birds, which digest the fleshy seed coat and disperse the seeds in their droppings. Many species are used in traditional medicines, and parts of the plants can be poisonous to humans.

== Cultivation and uses ==
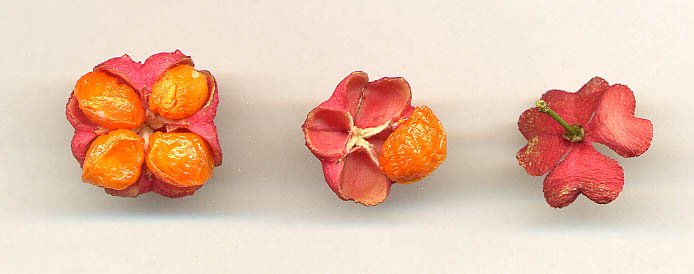
Mature spindle fruit (Euonymus sp.), split open to reveal the seeds

The wood of some species was traditionally used to make spindles for spinning wool; this use is the origin of the British English name of the shrubs.

Euonymus are popular garden shrubs, grown for their foliage, the deciduous species often exhibiting very bright red autumnal colours, and also for the decorative berries. Euonymus alatus (winged euonymus or burning-bush) is considered an invasive species in the woodlands of the northeastern United States.

== Selected species ==
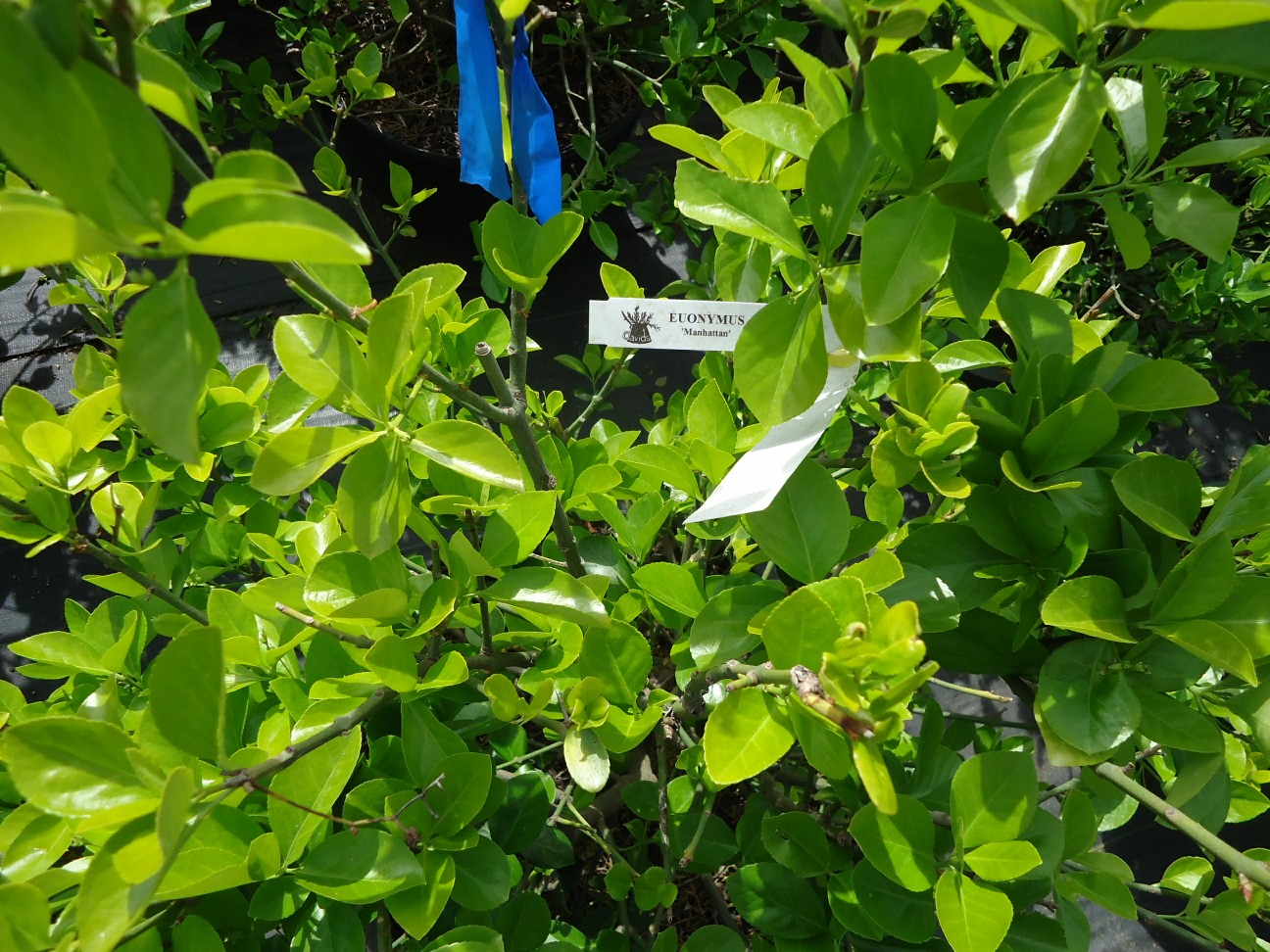
Euonymus fortunei in a nursery

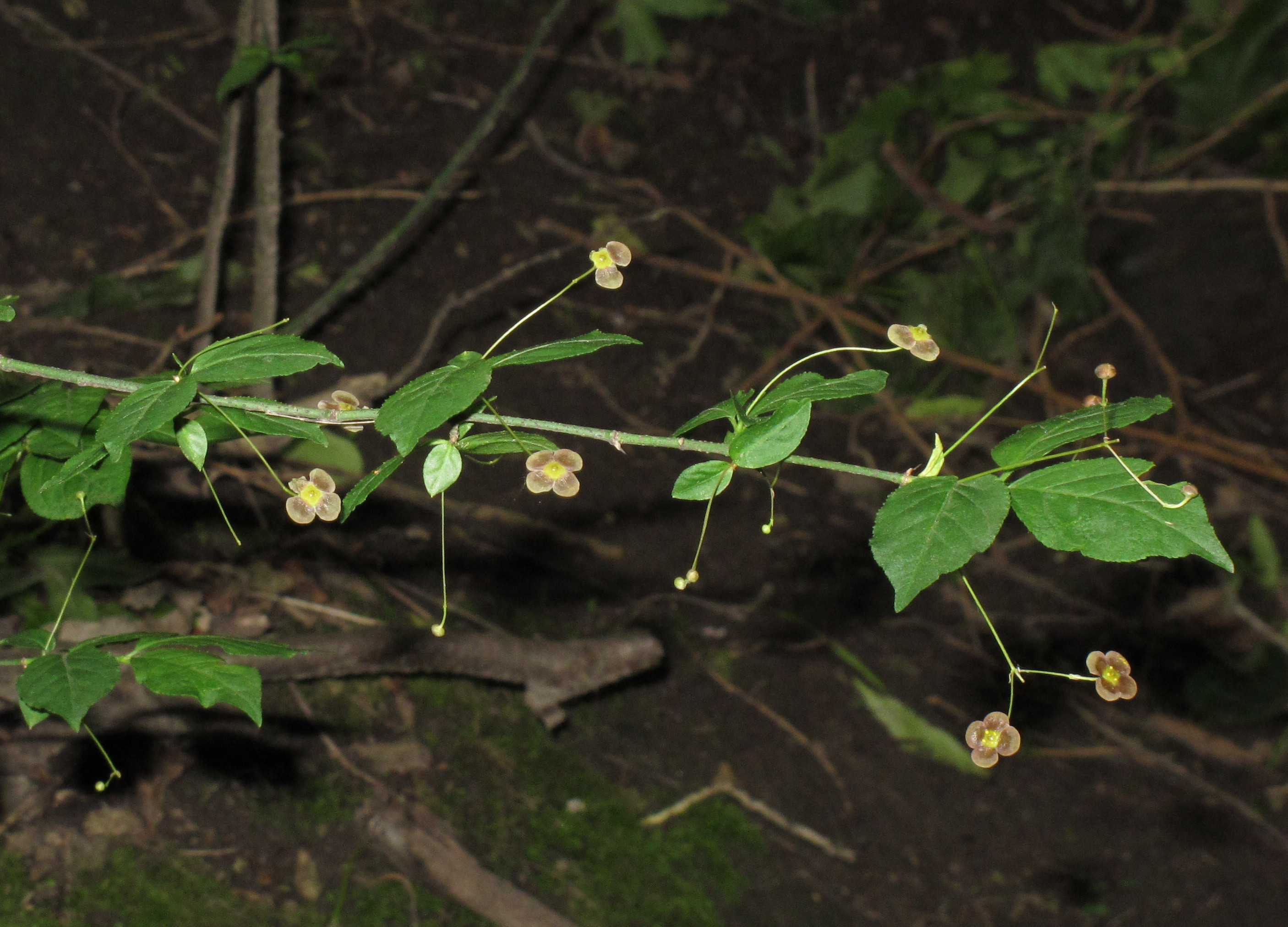
Euonymus verrucosus in Austria

- Euonymus acanthocarpus
- Euonymus acuminifolius
- Euonymus alatus – winged spindle, burning-bush
- Euonymus americanus – strawberry-bush
- Euonymus angulatus
- Euonymus atropurpureus – eastern burning-bush, eastern wahoo
- Euonymus castaneifolius
- Euonymus carnosus
- Euonymus cochinchinensis
- Euonymus cornutus
- Euonymus dichotomus
- Euonymus dielsianus
- Euonymus europaeus – European spindle
- Euonymus fimbriatus – fringed spindle tree
- Euonymus fortunei – Fortune's spindle, wintercreeper
- Euonymus frigidus
- Euonymus glandulosus
- Euonymus grandiflorus
- Euonymus hamiltonianus – Hamilton's spindle, Himalayan spindle, Siebold's spindle
- Euonymus indicus
- Euonymus japonicus – Japanese spindle, evergreen spindle
- Euonymus lanceifolia
- Euonymus laxiflorus
- Euonymus lucidus
- Euonymus macropterus
- Euonymus morrisonensis
- Euonymus myrianthus – many-flowered spindle
- Euonymus nanus – dwarf spindle
- Euonymus obovatus – running strawberry-bush
- Euonymus occidentalis – western burning-bush
- Euonymus oxyphyllus – Korean spindletree
- Euonymus phellomanus
- Euonymus sachalinensis
- Euonymus sanguineus – blood red spindle
- Euonymus serratifolius
- Euonymus verrucosus
- Euonymus walkeri
- Euonymus wilsonii – Chinese euonymus
