= Euonymus dielsianus =

Conservation status
- Least Concern (IUCN 3.1)

Scientific classification
- Kingdom: Plantae
- Clade: Tracheophytes
- Clade: Angiosperms
- Clade: Eudicots
- Clade: Rosids
- Order: Celastrales
- Family: Celastraceae
- Genus: Euonymus
- Species: E. dielsianus

Binomial name
- Euonymus dielsianus Loes. ex Diels

Synonyms
- Euonymus cavaleriei H.Lév.; Euonymus dielsianus var. euryanthus Hand.-Mazz.; Euonymus dielsianus var. fertilis Loes.; Euonymus dielsianus var. latifolius Loes.; Euonymus fertilis (Loes.) C.Y.Cheng ex C.Y.Chang; Euonymus fertilis var. euryanthus (Hand.-Mazz.) C.Y.Chang; Euonymus leclerei H.Lév.

Species of flowering plant

Euonymus dielsianus is a species of flowering plant in the family Celastraceae. It was first described by the German botanists Ludwig E. T. Loesener and Ludwig Diels in 1900.

The plant is mostly found in southwestern portion of China, at elevations between 200 and 1,600 meters above the sea level.
