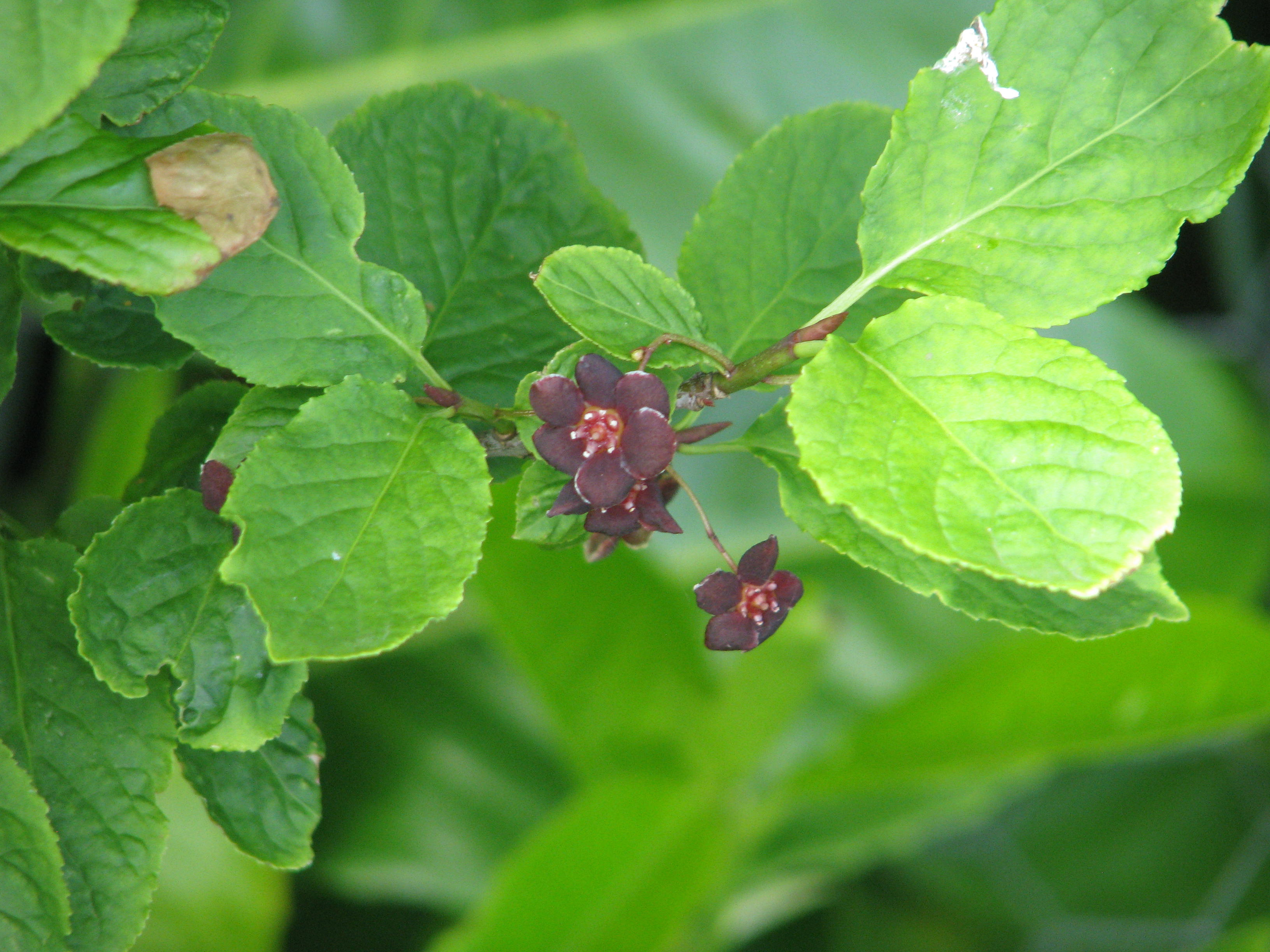

Conservation status
- Secure (NatureServe)

Scientific classification
- Kingdom: Plantae
- Clade: Tracheophytes
- Clade: Angiosperms
- Clade: Eudicots
- Clade: Rosids
- Order: Celastrales
- Family: Celastraceae
- Genus: Euonymus
- Species: E. occidentalis

Binomial name
- Euonymus occidentalis Nutt. ex Torr.
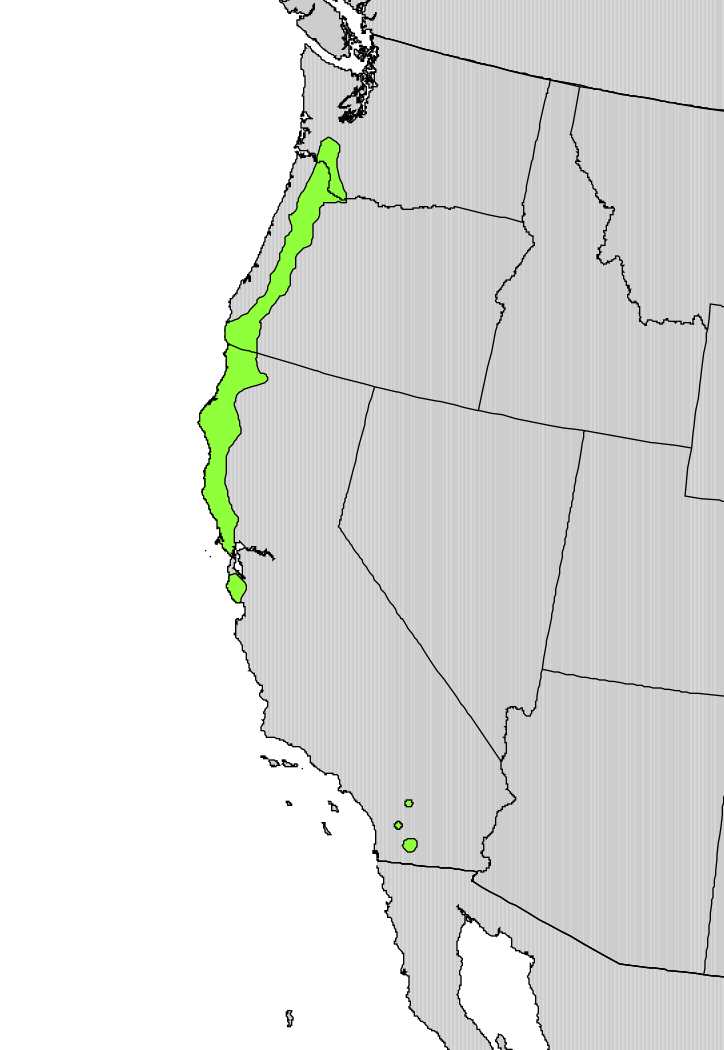
- Natural range

= Euonymus occidentalis =

Species of tree

Euonymus occidentalis is a species of spindle tree known by the common names western strawberry bush and western wahoo.

== Distribution ==
It is native to western North America from British Columbia to California, where it is the only member of its genus growing wild.

== Description ==
This is a shrub or small tree reaching maximum heights of anywhere from two to six metres (6 ft 7 in to 19 ft 8 in). The thin, green, oval-shaped leaves are three to fourteen centimetres (1.2 to 5.5 in) long and sometimes rolled under along the edges. The inflorescence holds up to five small flowers at the end of a long peduncle. Each flower has five rounded pink to brown and white mottled petals around a central nectar disc with 5 nubs. The fruit is a rounded capsule with three bulging lobes. It opens to reveal one seed in each of the three lobes. The seed is concealed in a red aril.
