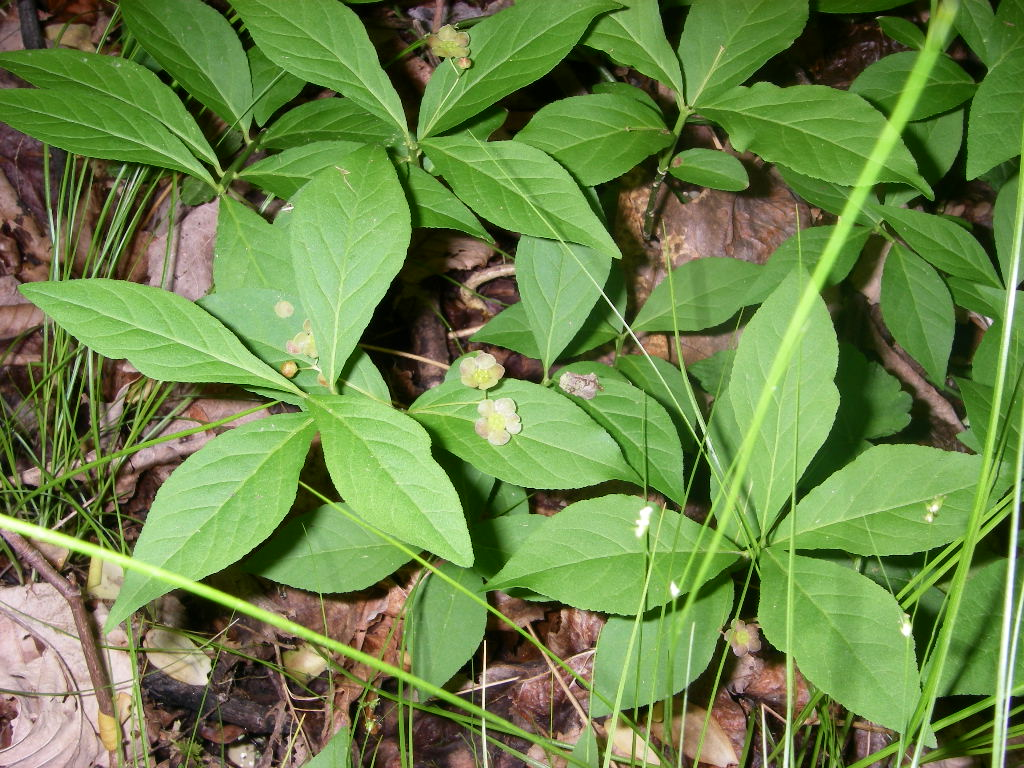

Conservation status
- Secure (NatureServe)

Scientific classification
- Kingdom: Plantae
- Clade: Tracheophytes
- Clade: Angiosperms
- Clade: Eudicots
- Clade: Rosids
- Order: Celastrales
- Family: Celastraceae
- Genus: Euonymus
- Species: E. obovatus

Binomial name
- Euonymus obovatus Nutt.

= Euonymus obovatus =

Species of flowering plant

Euonymus obovatus, the running strawberry bush, is a trailing, woodland groundcover plant of the family Celastraceae, which is native to North America in the eastern United States and south-eastern Canada.
