= Euonymus laxiflorus =

Conservation status
- Least Concern (IUCN 3.1)

Scientific classification
- Kingdom: Plantae
- Clade: Tracheophytes
- Clade: Angiosperms
- Clade: Eudicots
- Clade: Rosids
- Order: Celastrales
- Family: Celastraceae
- Genus: Euonymus
- Species: E. laxiflorus

Binomial name
- Euonymus laxiflorus Champ. ex Benth.

Synonyms
- List: Euonymus blinii H.Lév.; Euonymus crosnieri H.Lév. & Vaniot; Euonymus cuspidatus Loes.; Euonymus forbesianus Loes.; Euonymus incertus Pit.; Euonymus kwangtungensis C.Y.Cheng; Euonymus laxicymosus C.Y.Cheng ex J.S.Ma; Euonymus paniculatus Wight ex G.Lawson; Euonymus pellucidifolius Hayata; Euonymus rostratus W.W.Sm.; Euonymus rubescens Pit.; Euonymus vaniotii H.Lév.; Masakia pellucidifolia (Hayata) Nakai

Species of flowering plant

Euonymus laxiflorus (synonym Euonymus paniculatus) is a species of plant in the family Celastraceae. It is native to China, Taiwan, India and mainland Southeast Asia.
