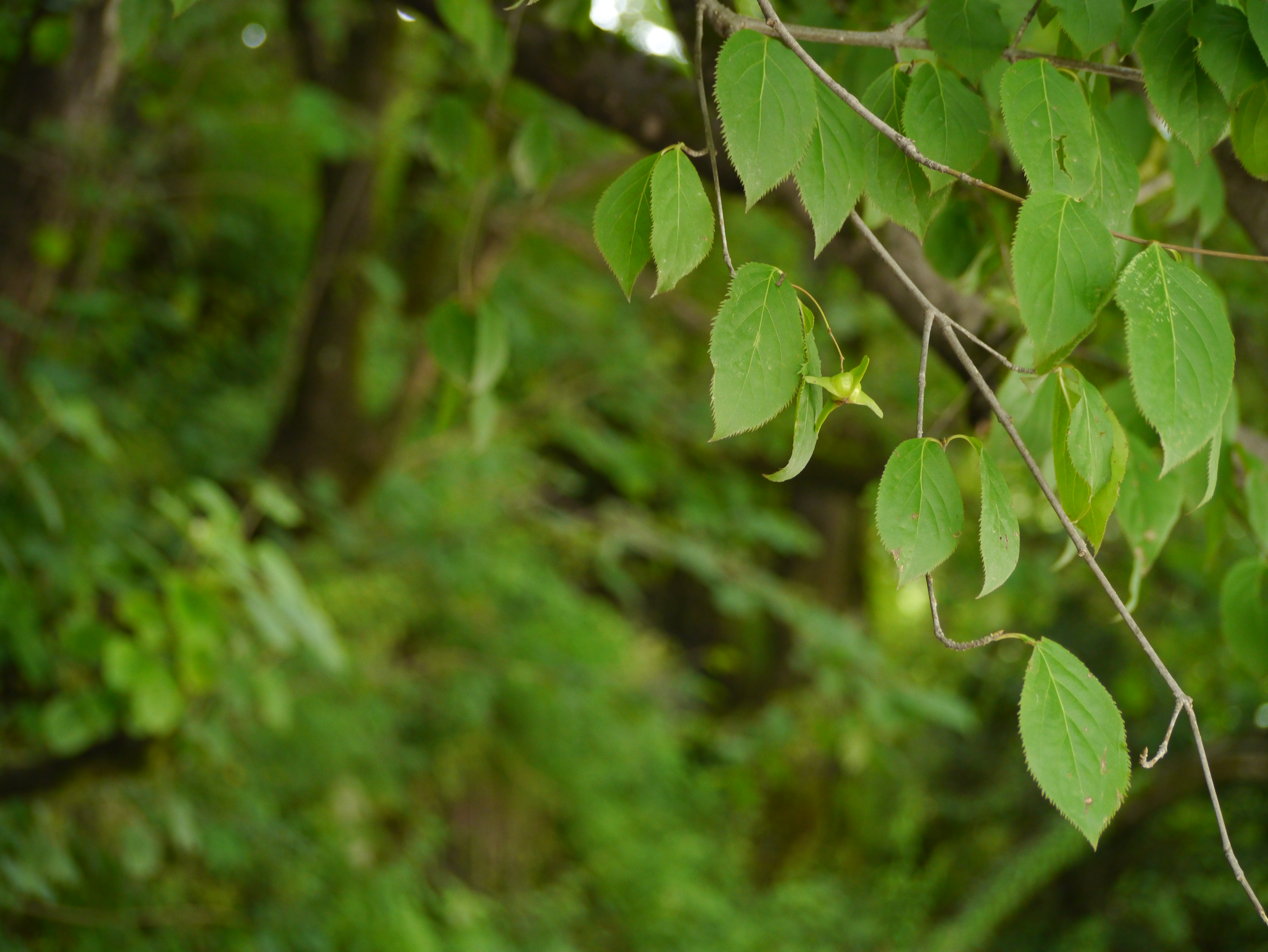

Scientific classification
- Kingdom: Plantae
- Clade: Tracheophytes
- Clade: Angiosperms
- Clade: Eudicots
- Clade: Rosids
- Order: Celastrales
- Family: Celastraceae
- Genus: Euonymus
- Species: E. fimbriatus

Binomial name
- Euonymus fimbriatus Wall.

= Euonymus fimbriatus =

Species of flowering plant

Euonymus fimbriatus, also known as the fringed spindle tree, is a species of flowering plant in the genus Euonymus. This tree is native to the Himalayas. It can grow up to 10 metres (33 ft) tall and it is deciduous.
