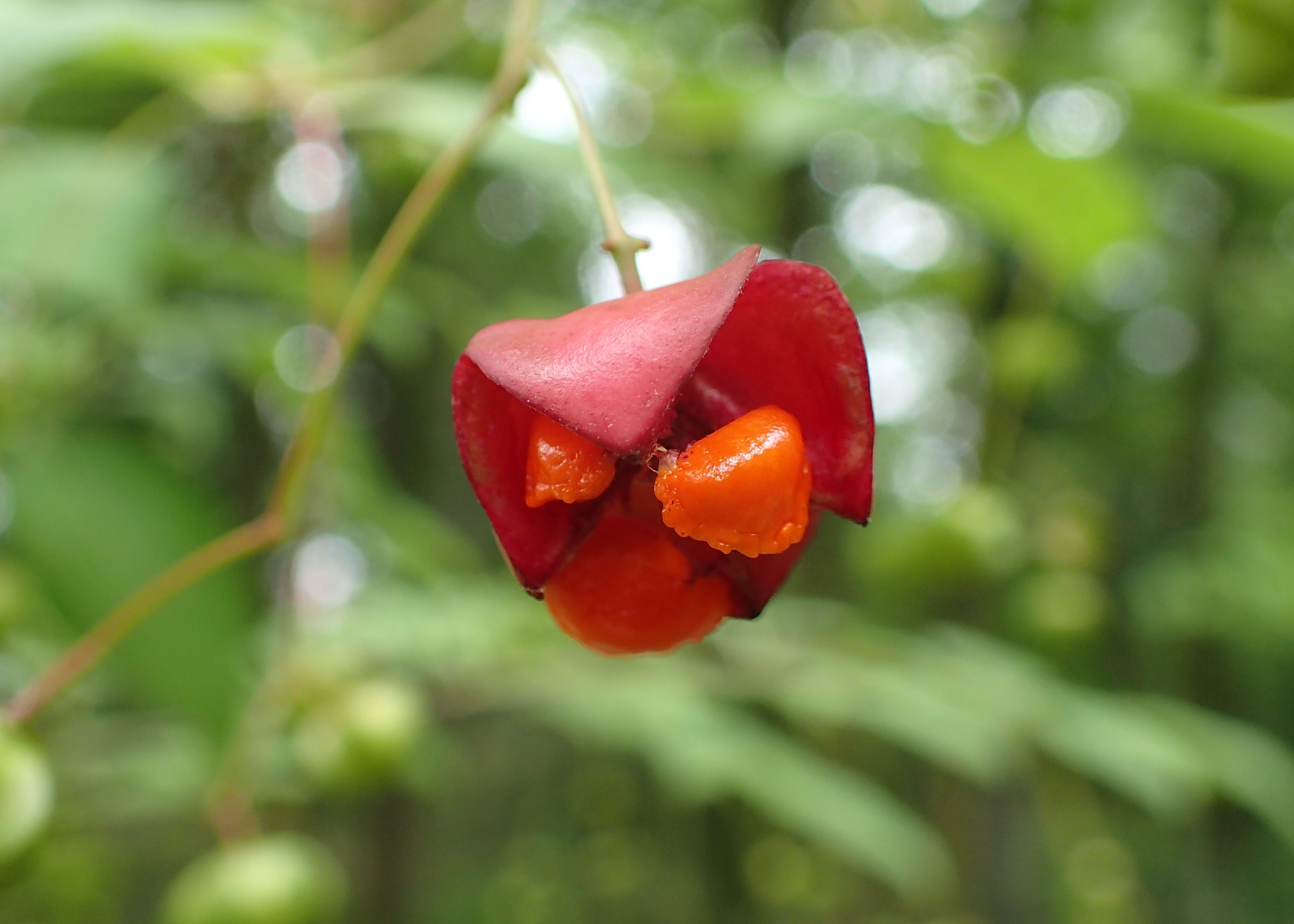
- Ripe red fruit splits open to reveal orange arils.
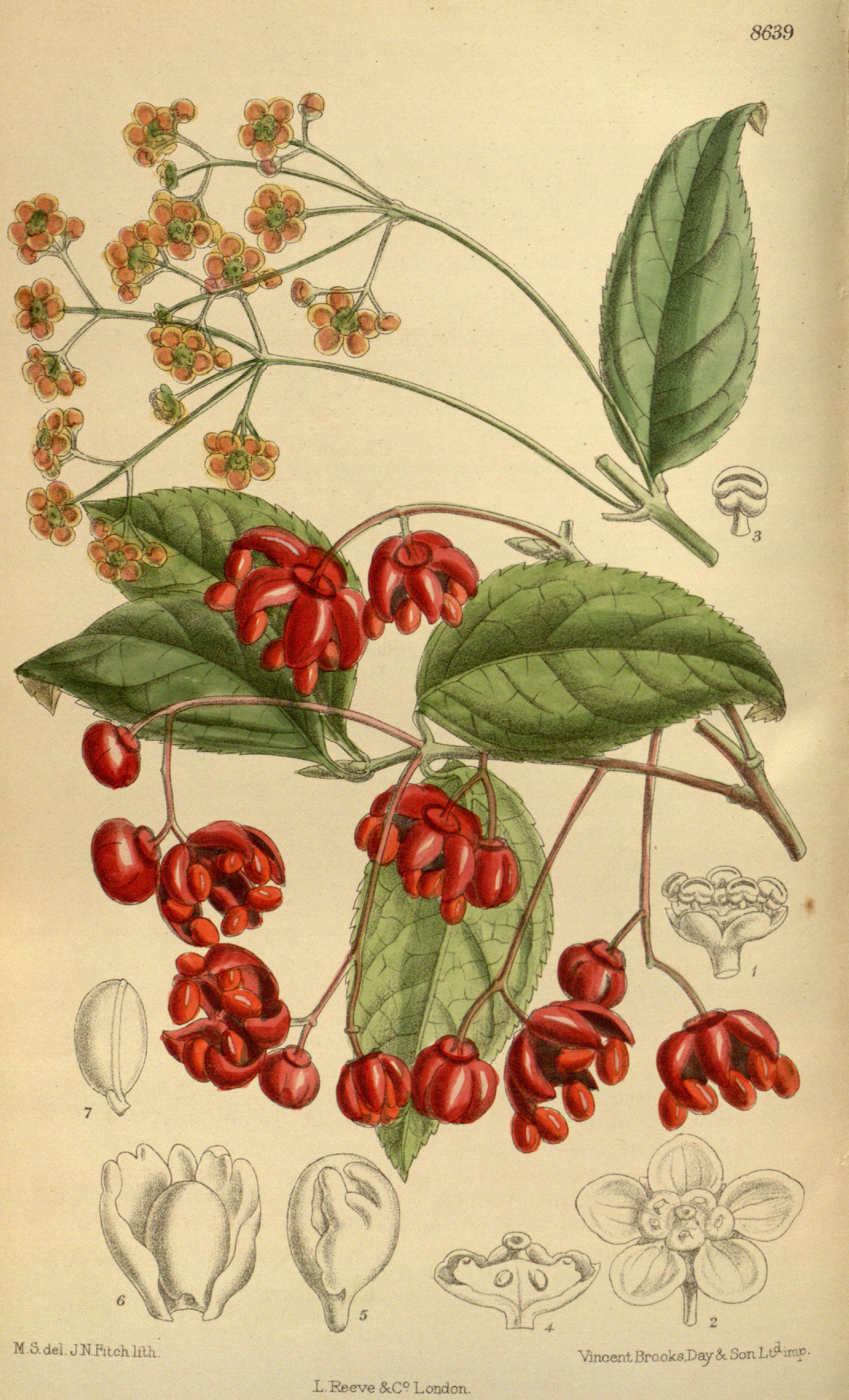
- Botanical illustration

Scientific classification
- Kingdom: Plantae
- Clade: Embryophytes
- Clade: Tracheophytes
- Clade: Spermatophytes
- Clade: Angiosperms
- Clade: Eudicots
- Clade: Rosids
- Order: Celastrales
- Family: Celastraceae
- Genus: Euonymus
- Species: E. oxyphyllus

Binomial name
- Euonymus oxyphyllus Miq.

Synonyms
- List: Euonymus flavescens Nakai; Euonymus latifolius A.Gray; Euonymus laxiflorus Blume ex Miq.; Euonymus nipponicus Maxim.; Euonymus yesoensis Koidz.; Kalonymus oxyphylla (Miq.) F.T.Wang & S.X.Li; Kalonymus yesoensis (Koidz.) Prokh.; Pragmotessara latifolia Pierre; Turibana nipponica (Maxim.) Nakai; Turibana oxyphylla (Miq.) Nakai; Turibana yesoensis (Koidz.) Nakai

= Euonymus oxyphyllus =

Species of flowering plant

Euonymus oxyphyllus, the Korean spindle tree, is a species of flowering plant in the family Celastraceae, native to central and eastern China (including Taiwan), Manchuria, Korea, Japan and the Kurils. It is a shrub or small tree typically reaching 2.5 m (8 ft). The Royal Horticultural Society considers it to be a good tree for smaller gardens, especially for its colorful Autumn foliage and fruits.

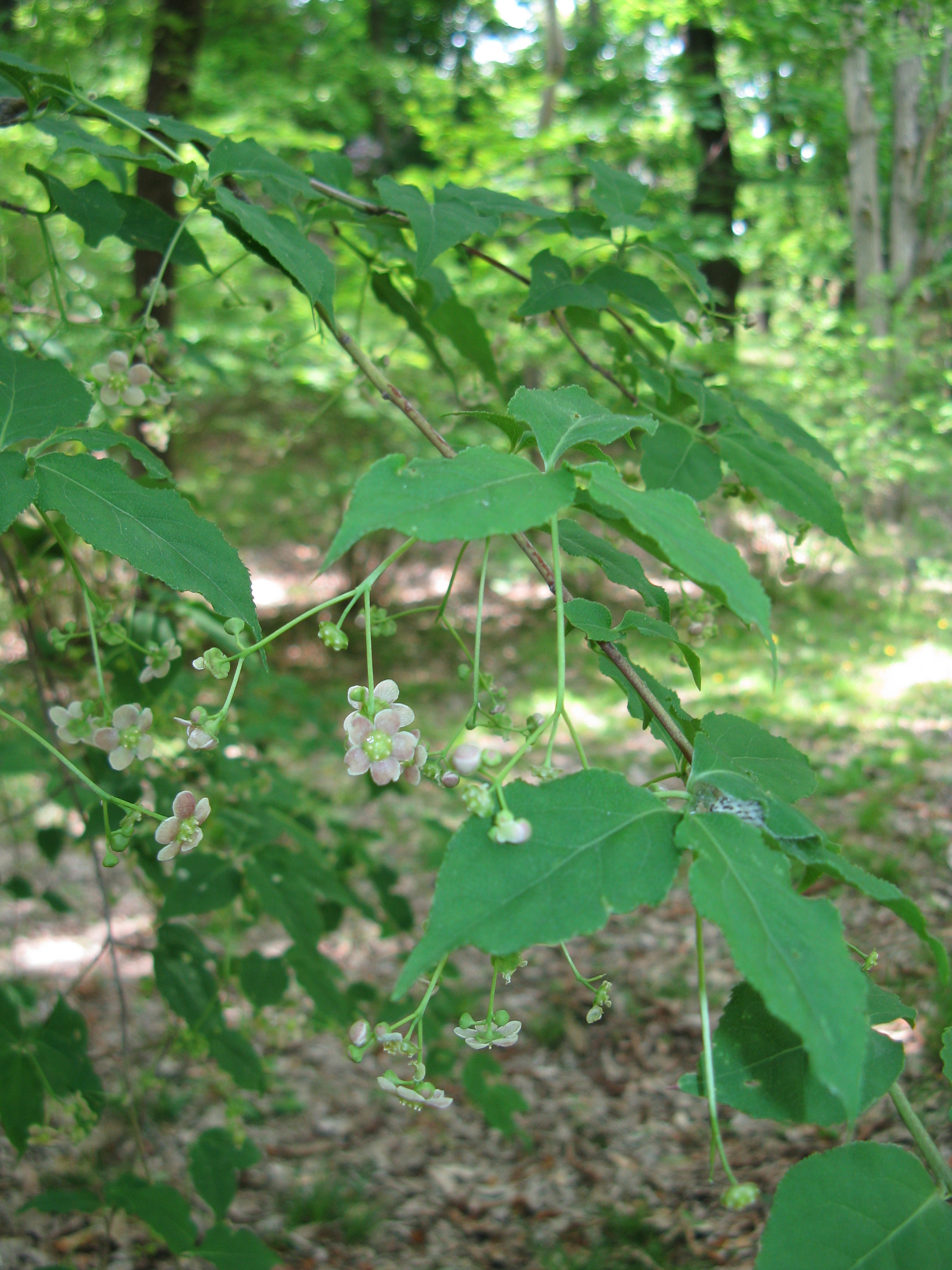
Flowers are inconspicuous.

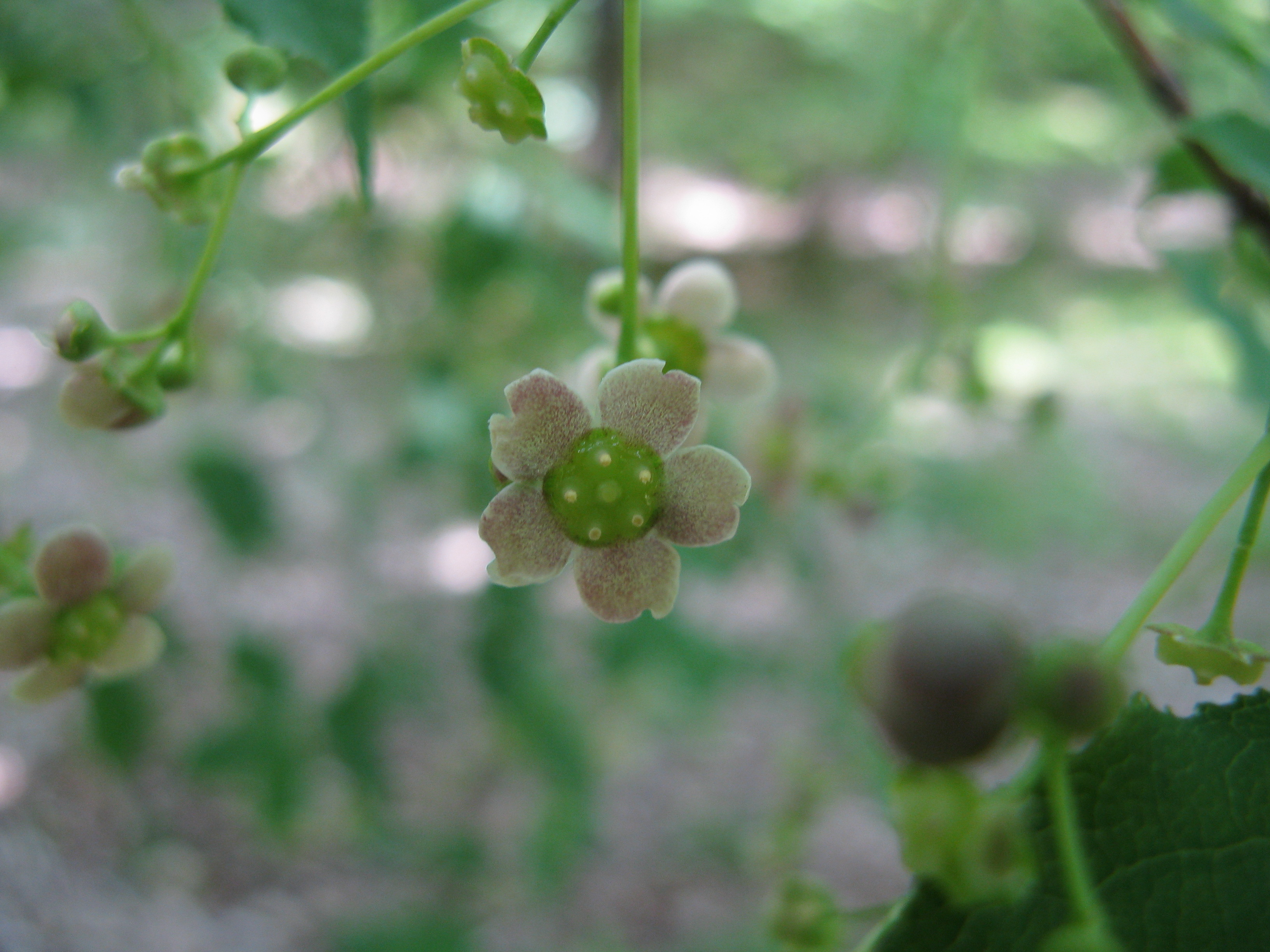
Close up of flower

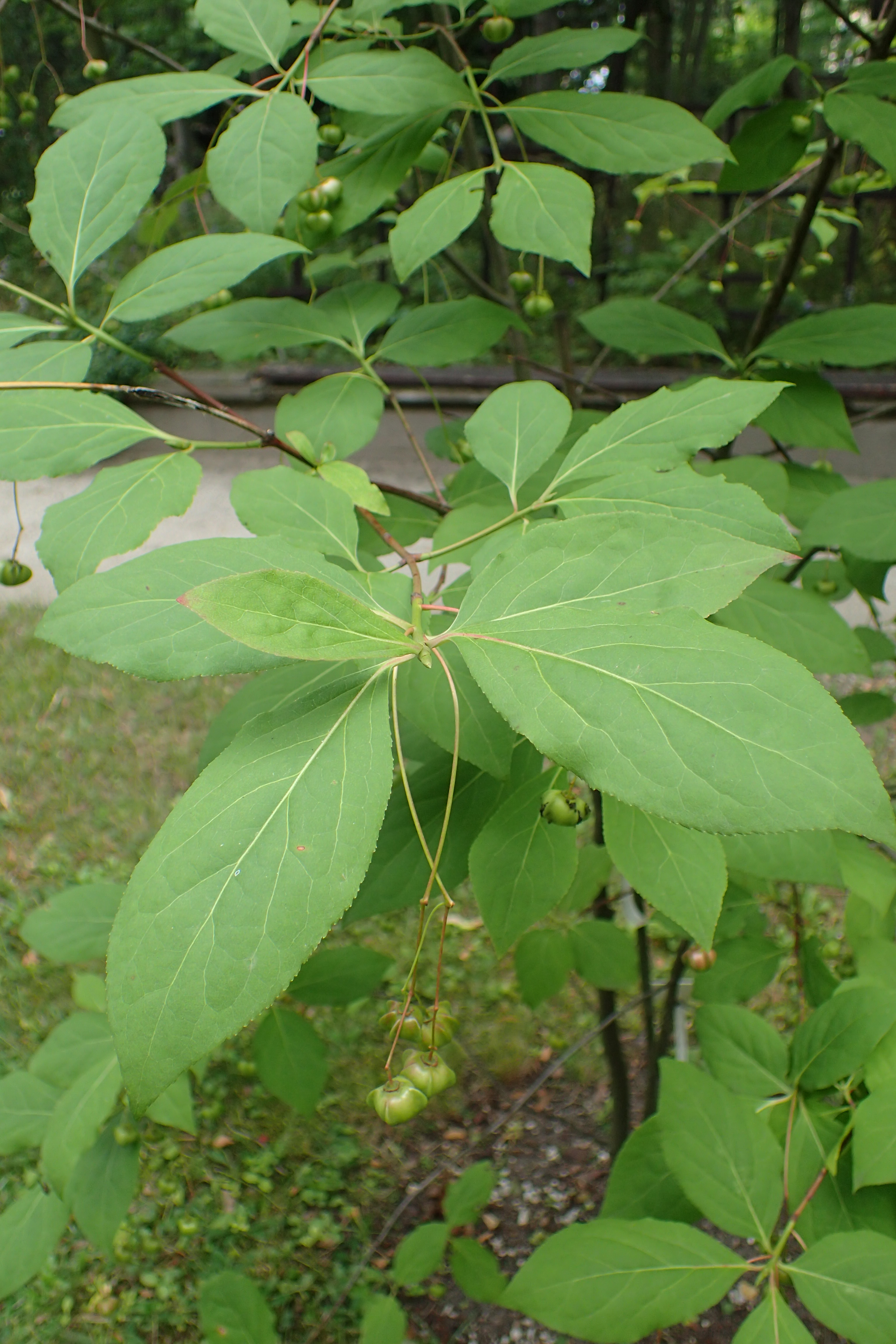
Ripening fruit hanging below leaves

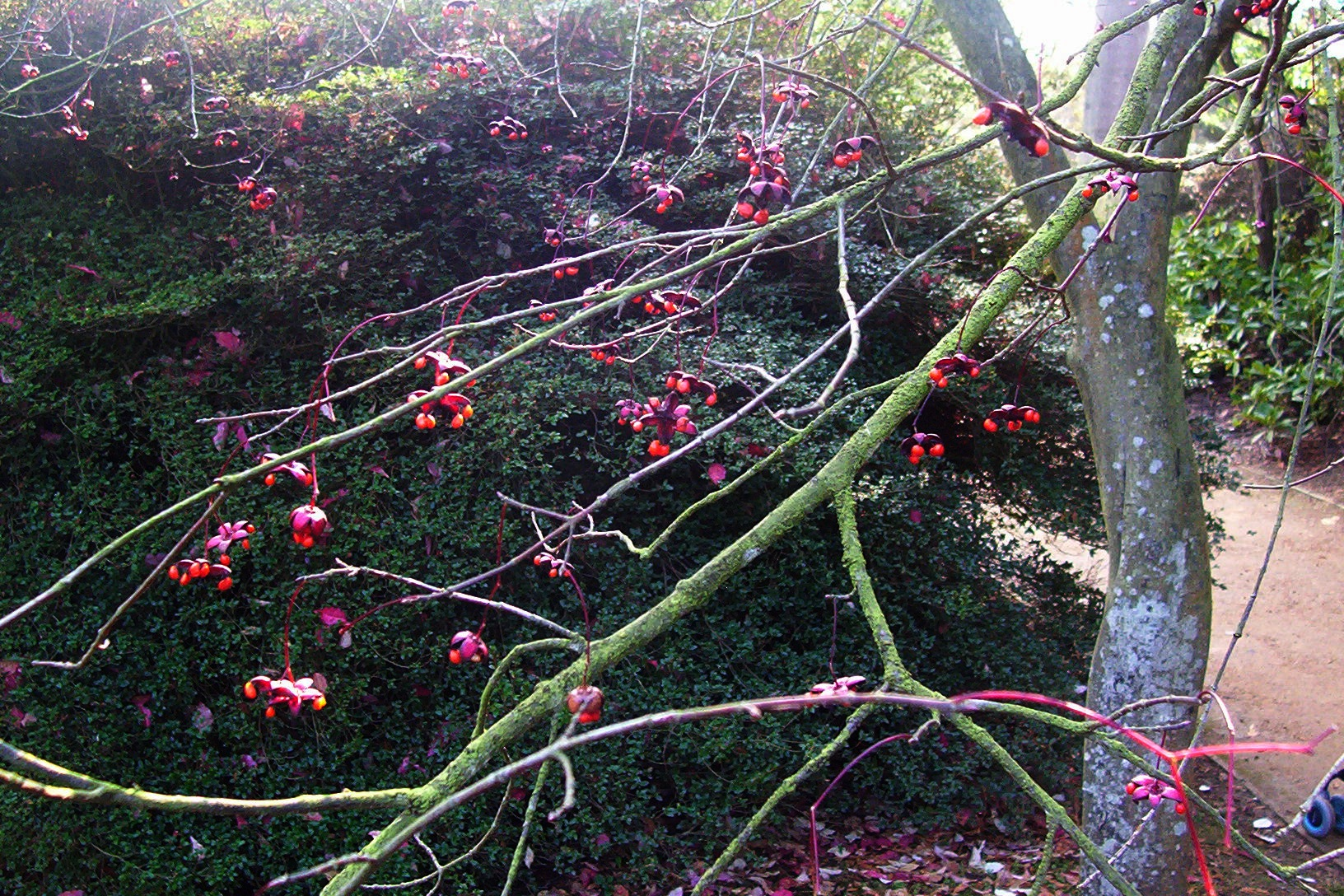
Branch showing fruit remaining after leaf fall
