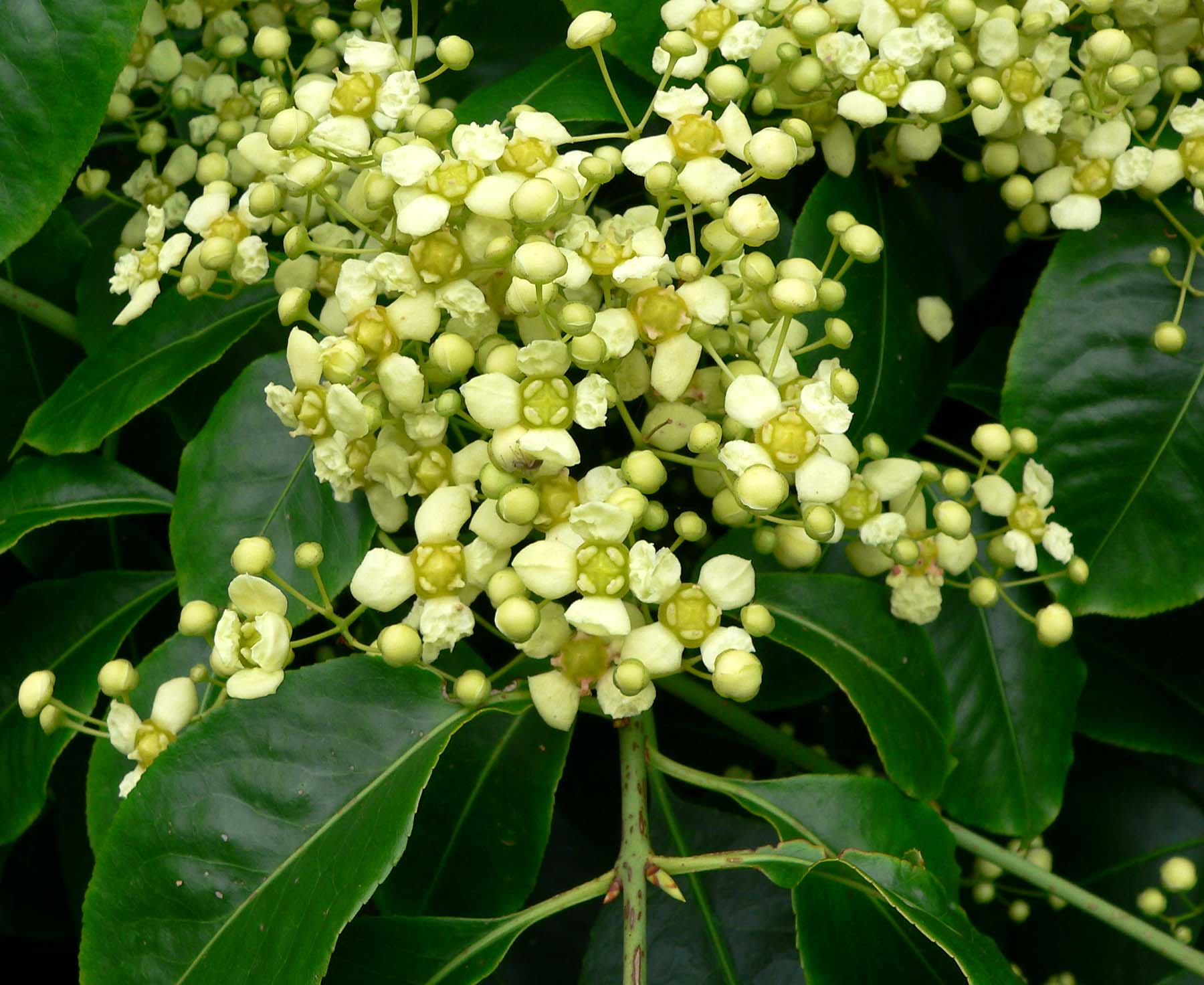
- Euonymus carnosus flowers

Conservation status
- Least Concern (IUCN 3.1)

Scientific classification
- Kingdom: Plantae
- Clade: Tracheophytes
- Clade: Angiosperms
- Clade: Eudicots
- Clade: Rosids
- Order: Celastrales
- Family: Celastraceae
- Genus: Euonymus
- Species: E. carnosus

Binomial name
- Euonymus carnosus Hemsl.

Synonyms
- List: Euonymus batakensis Hayata; Euonymus huangii H.Y.Li & Yuen P.Yang; Euonymus platycline Ohwi; Euonymus tanakae Maxim.; Genitia batakensis (Hayata) Nakai; Genitia carnosus (Hemsl.) H.L.Li & Ding Hou; Genitia tanakae (Maxim.) Nakai; Masakia carnosa (Hemsl.) Nakai

= Euonymus carnosus =

Species of plant in the genus Euonymus

Euonymus carnosus, called the fleshy‑flowered spindletree, is a species of flowering plant in the genus Euonymus, native to southeast and south‑central China, Taiwan, the Bonin Islands, the Ryukyu Islands, and Japan. It has gained the Royal Horticultural Society's Award of Garden Merit.
