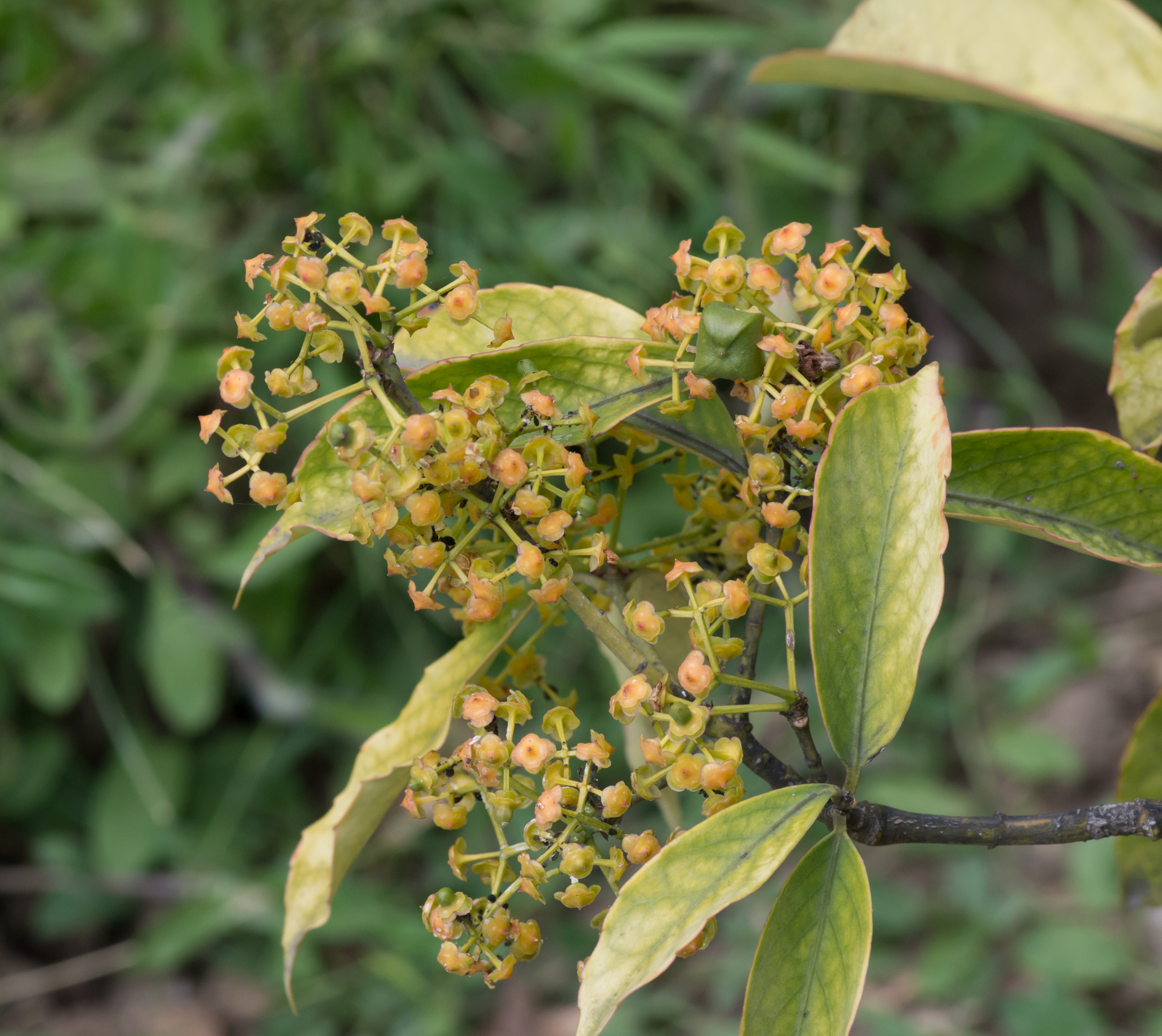
- In bloom

Conservation status
- Least Concern (IUCN 3.1)

Scientific classification
- Kingdom: Plantae
- Clade: Tracheophytes
- Clade: Angiosperms
- Clade: Eudicots
- Clade: Rosids
- Order: Celastrales
- Family: Celastraceae
- Genus: Euonymus
- Species: E. myrianthus

Binomial name
- Euonymus myrianthus Hemsl.

Synonyms
- List: Euonymus lipoensis Z.R.Xu; Euonymus myrianthus var. crassifolius (Loes.) Blakelock; Euonymus myrianthus var. tenuifolius (Loes.) Blakelock; Euonymus myrianthus var. tenuis C.Y.Cheng ex T.L.Xu & Q.H.Chen; Euonymus rosthornii Loes.; Euonymus rosthornii var. crassifolius Loes.; Euonymus rosthornii var. tenuifolius Loes.; Euonymus sargentianus Loes. & Rehder

= Euonymus myrianthus =

Species of plant

Euonymus myrianthus, the many-flowered spindle, is a species of flowering plant in the family Celastraceae. It is native to central and southern China. A variable evergreen shrub or small tree, and reaching 3 to 12 m (10 to 39 ft) in height, it is typically found in wooded areas and forests, from near sea level up to 1,200 m (3,900 ft). In cultivation it does not grow much past 4 m (13 ft), and is valued for its profusion of yellow-orange fruit and scarlet arils which remain on the plant and provide winter interest. It is readily available from commercial suppliers.
