= The Waverly =

- U.S. National Register of Historic Places
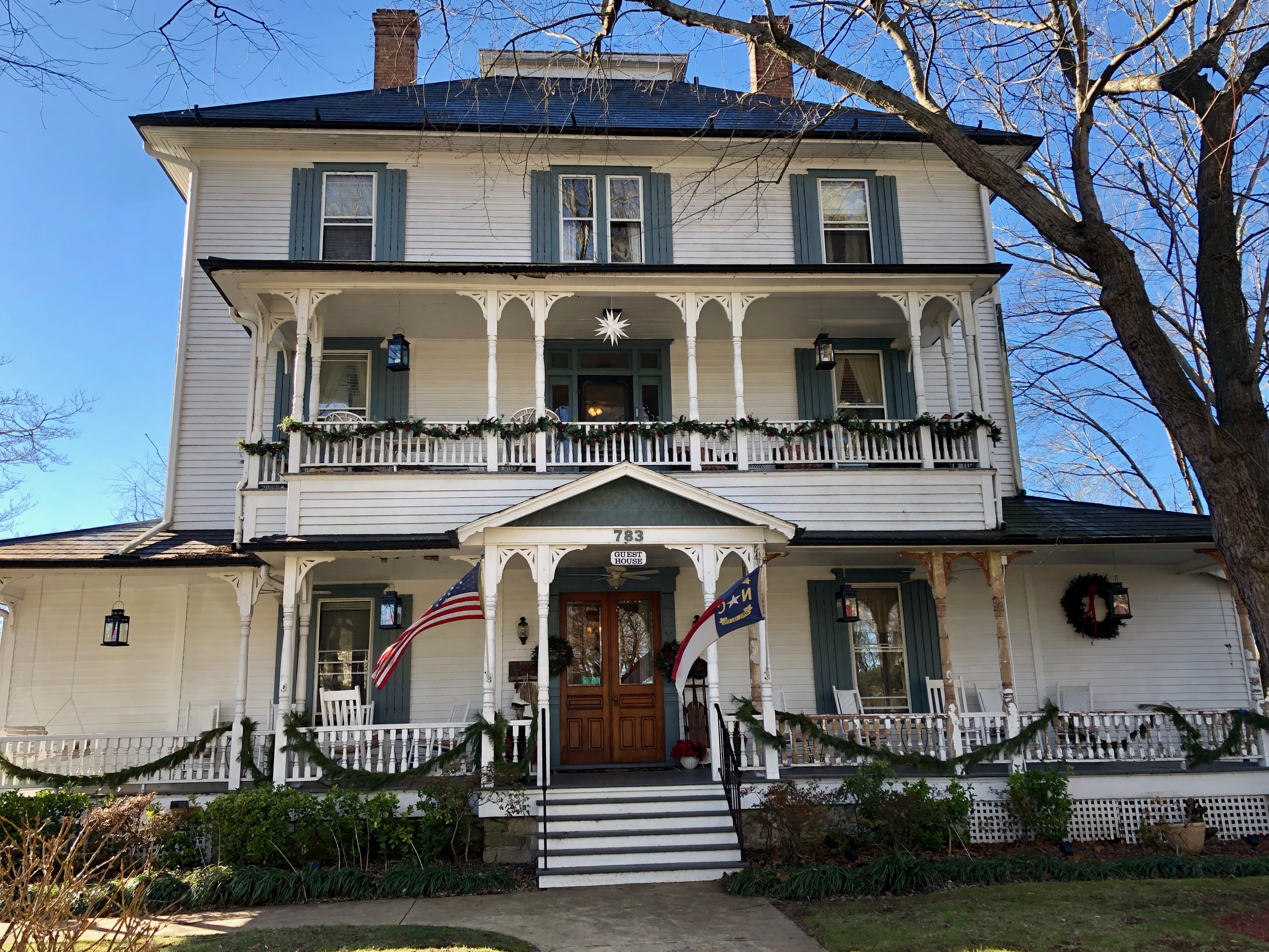
- The Waverly Hotel, January 2019

- Location within North Carolina Location within the United States
- Location: 783 N. Main St., Hendersonville, North Carolina
- Coordinates: 35°19′15″N 82°27′42″W
- Area: 0.4 acres (0.16 ha)
- Built: c. 1898
- Architectural style: Queen Anne
- MPS: Hendersonville MPS
- NRHP reference No.: 89000035
- Added to NRHP: February 24, 1989

The Waverly, also known as the Anderson Boarding House, is a historic hotel building located at Hendersonville, Henderson County, North Carolina. It was built about 1898, and is a three-story, Queen Anne style frame building. It features a two-tiered sawnwork-trimmed porch and widow's walk. The building was expanded to three stories following a fire about 1910. A one-story frame wing was added about 1940.

It was listed on the National Register of Historic Places in 1989.
