= Aloah Hotel =

Historic hotel in North Carolina, US

- U.S. National Register of Historic Places
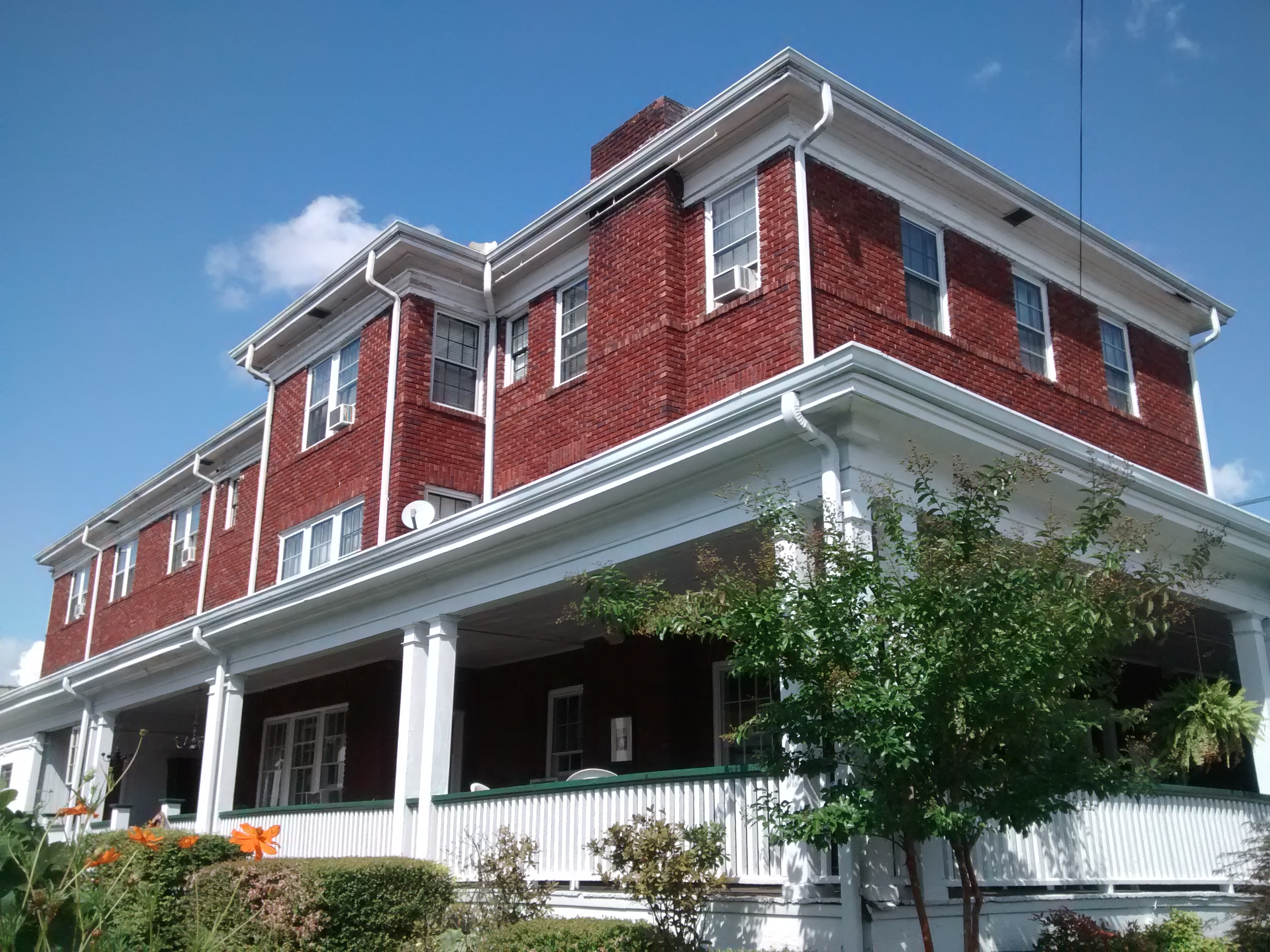
- Inn on Church, September 2014

- Location within North Carolina Location within the United States
- Location: 201 3rd Ave. West, Hendersonville, North Carolina
- Coordinates: 35°18′57″N 82°27′41″W
- Area: 0.3 acres (0.12 ha)
- Built: 1919
- Architectural style: Classical Revival
- MPS: Hendersonville MPS
- NRHP reference No.: 89000036
- Added to NRHP: February 24, 1989

Aloah Hotel, also known as The Hendersonville Inn, Carson Hotel, and the Inn on Church, is a historic hotel building located at Hendersonville, Henderson County, North Carolina. It was built in 1919, and is a three-story, rectangular brick building with Classical Revival style design elements. The front facade features a hipped roof porch with paired square posts and a plain wooden balustrade.

It was listed on the National Register of Historic Places in 1989.
