= Clough H. Rice House =

Historic house in North Carolina, United States

- U.S. National Register of Historic Places
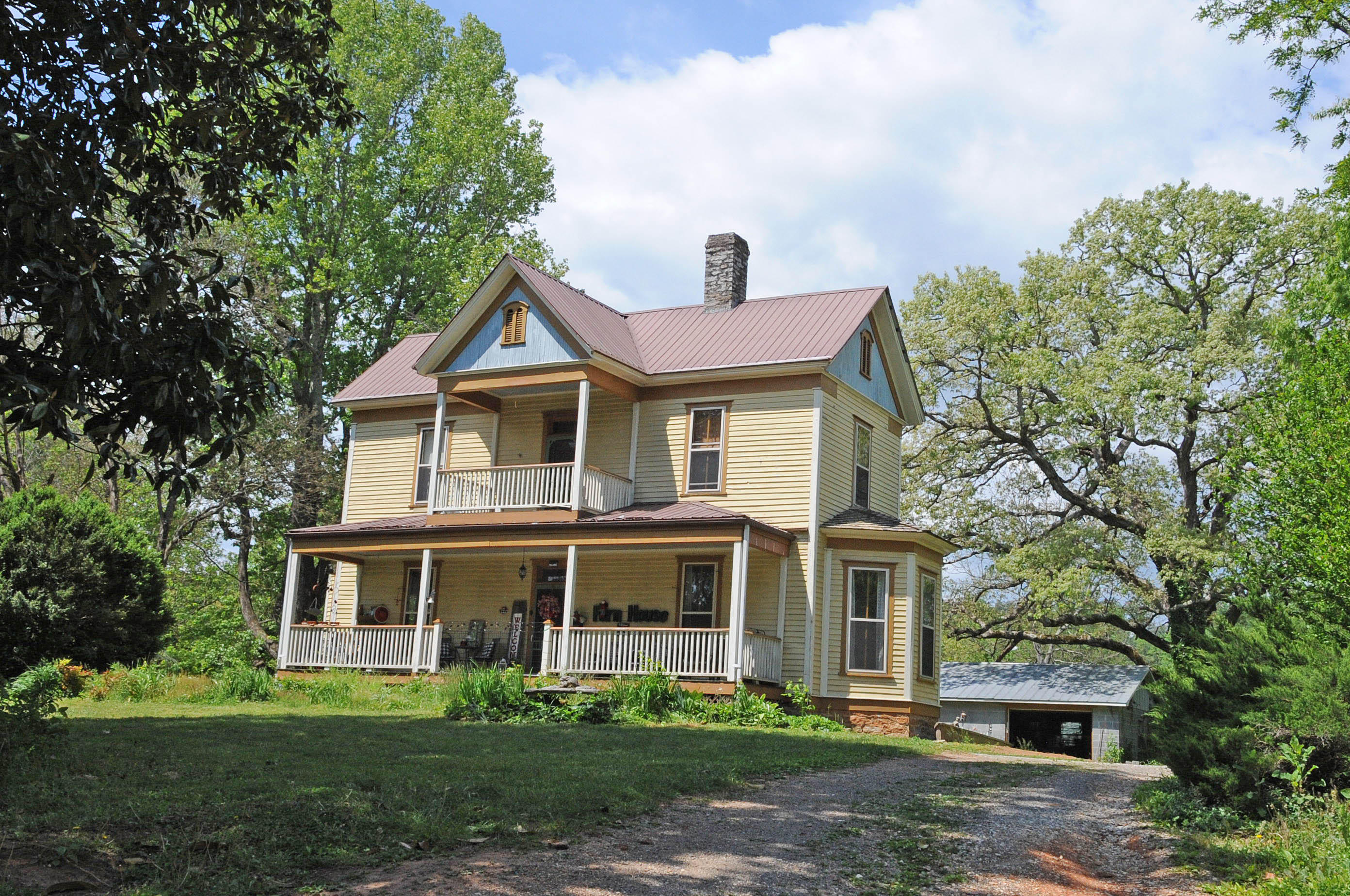

- Location within North Carolina Location within the United States
- Location: 219 Stoney Mountain Rd., Hendersonville, North Carolina
- Coordinates: 35°20′19″N 82°28′35″W
- Area: 0.7 acres (0.28 ha)
- Built: c. 1875
- Architectural style: I-house, Italianate
- NRHP reference No.: 11000974
- Added to NRHP: December 27, 2011

Clough H. Rice House is a historic home located at Hendersonville, Henderson County, North Carolina. It was built about 1875, and is a two-story, single-pile, frame I-house, with Italianate style design elements. It has a two-story, gable-roofed rear ell. It is sheathed in weatherboard and sits on a rubble masonry foundation.

It was listed on the National Register of Historic Places in 2011.
