= Lenox Park Historic District =

Historic district in North Carolina, United States

- U.S. National Register of Historic Places
- U.S. Historic district
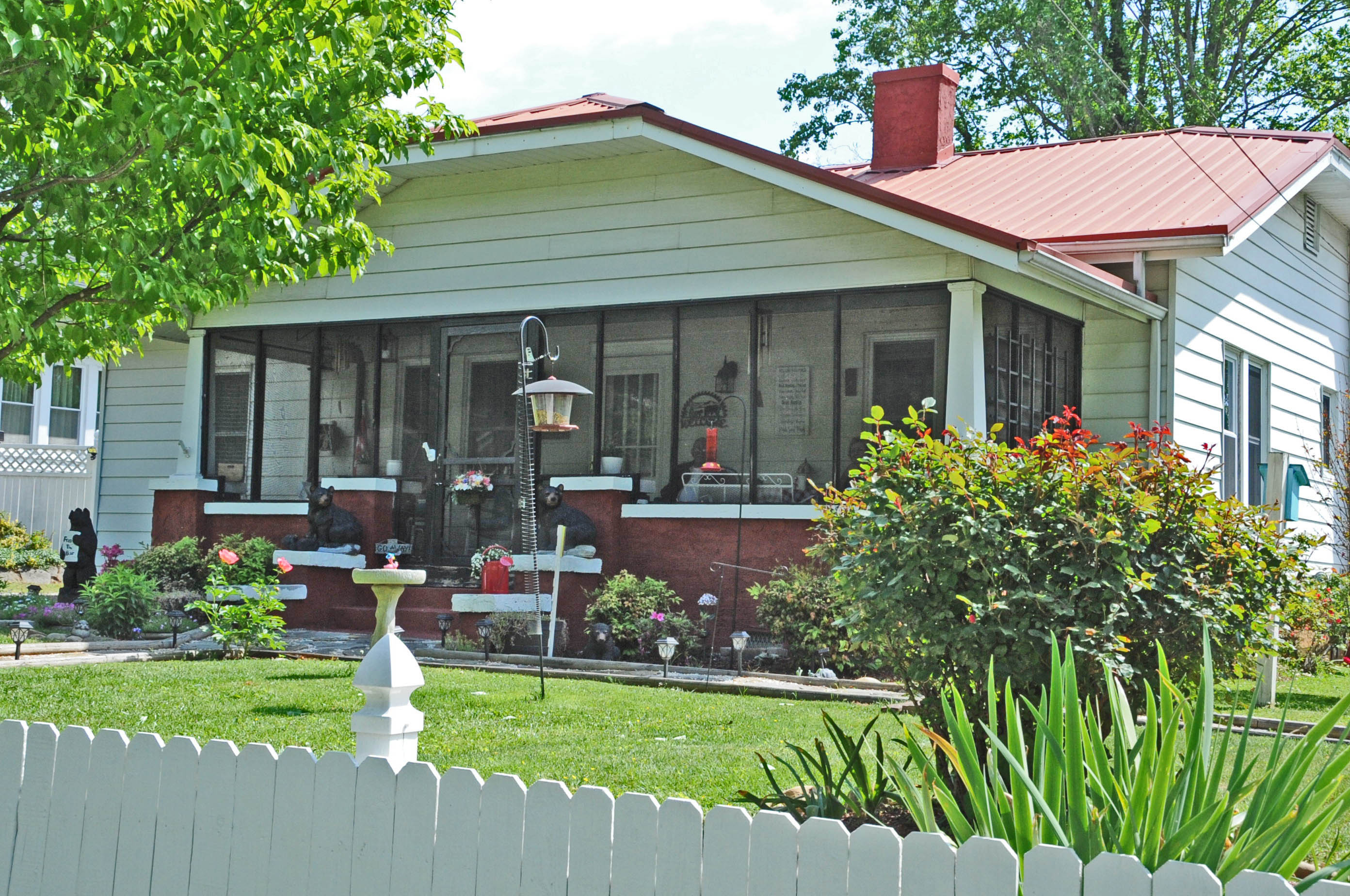
- Fred Sudduth House

- Location within North Carolina Location within the United States
- Location: Roughly bounded by Allen, Spring, and S. Whitted Sts., and Southern RR., Hendersonville, North Carolina
- Coordinates: 35°18′36″N 82°28′06″W
- Area: 15 acres (6.1 ha)
- Built: 1908
- Built by: Jones, Acie H., builder
- Architectural style: Queen Anne, Bungalow/craftsman, Four Square
- MPS: Hendersonville MPS
- NRHP reference No.: 02001661
- Added to NRHP: December 31, 2002

Lenox Park Historic District, also known as Columbia Park, is a national historic district located at Hendersonville, Henderson County, North Carolina. The district encompasses 42 contributing buildings and 1 contributing structure in a predominantly residential section of Hendersonville developed between 1908 and 1952. It includes notable examples of Queen Anne, American Foursquare, and Bungalow / American Craftsman residential architecture. Located in the district is the contributing Spring Street Bridge (1930) and the City Ice & Storage Company Building (1915).

It was listed on the National Register of Historic Places in 2002.

== Gallery ==
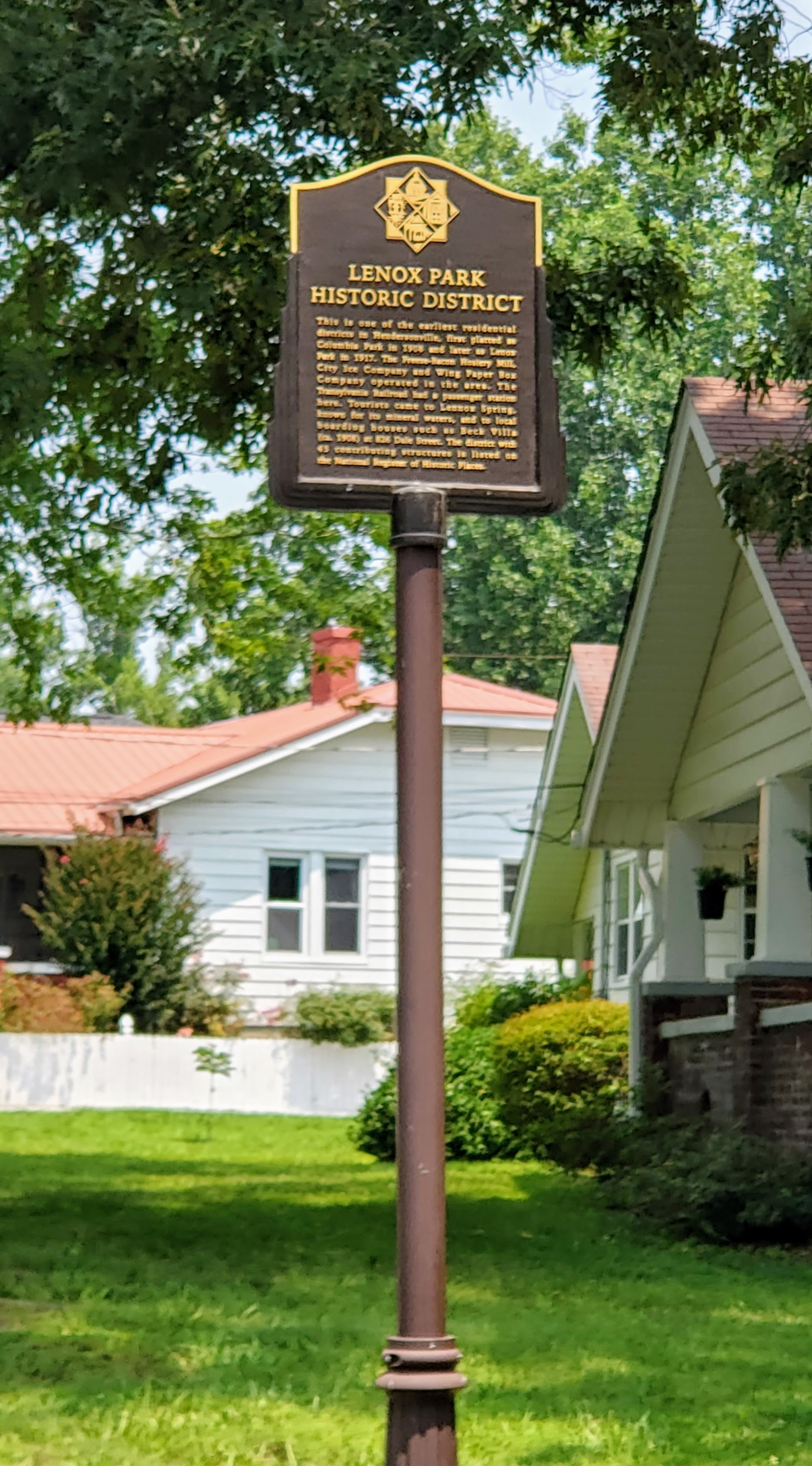
Lenox Park Historic District Historic Marker, 2021

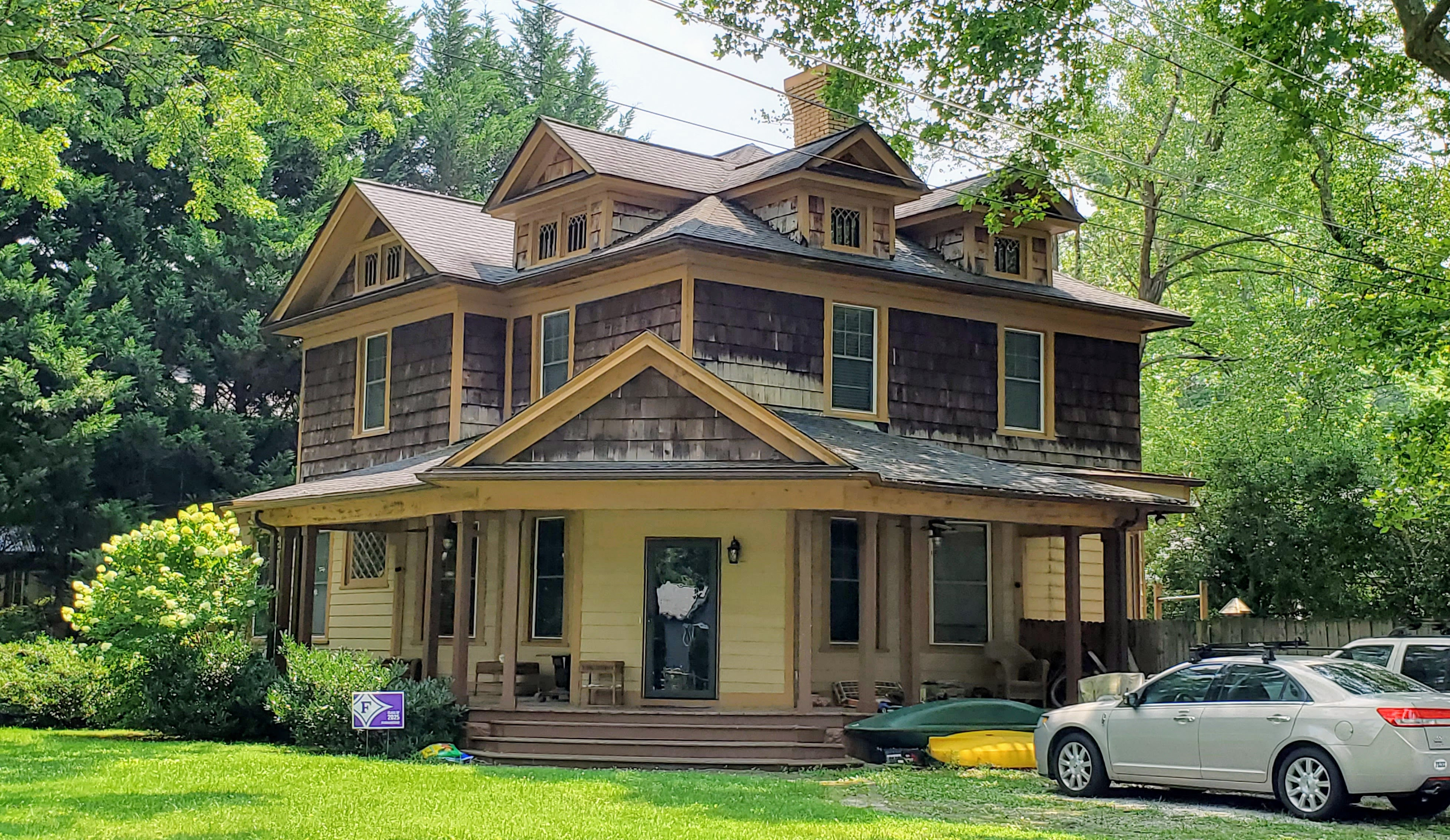
826 Dale Street, 2021

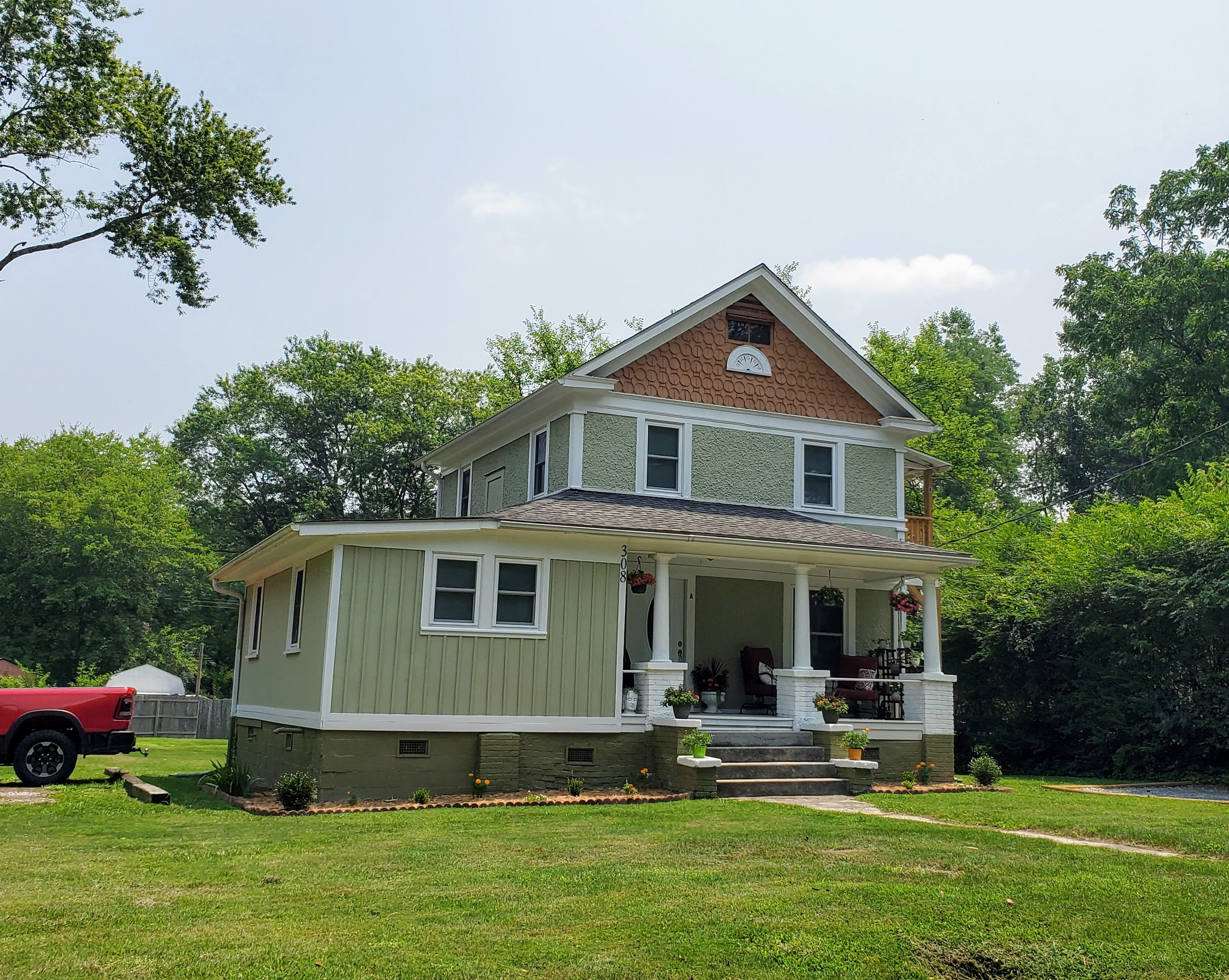
308 Rose Street, 2021

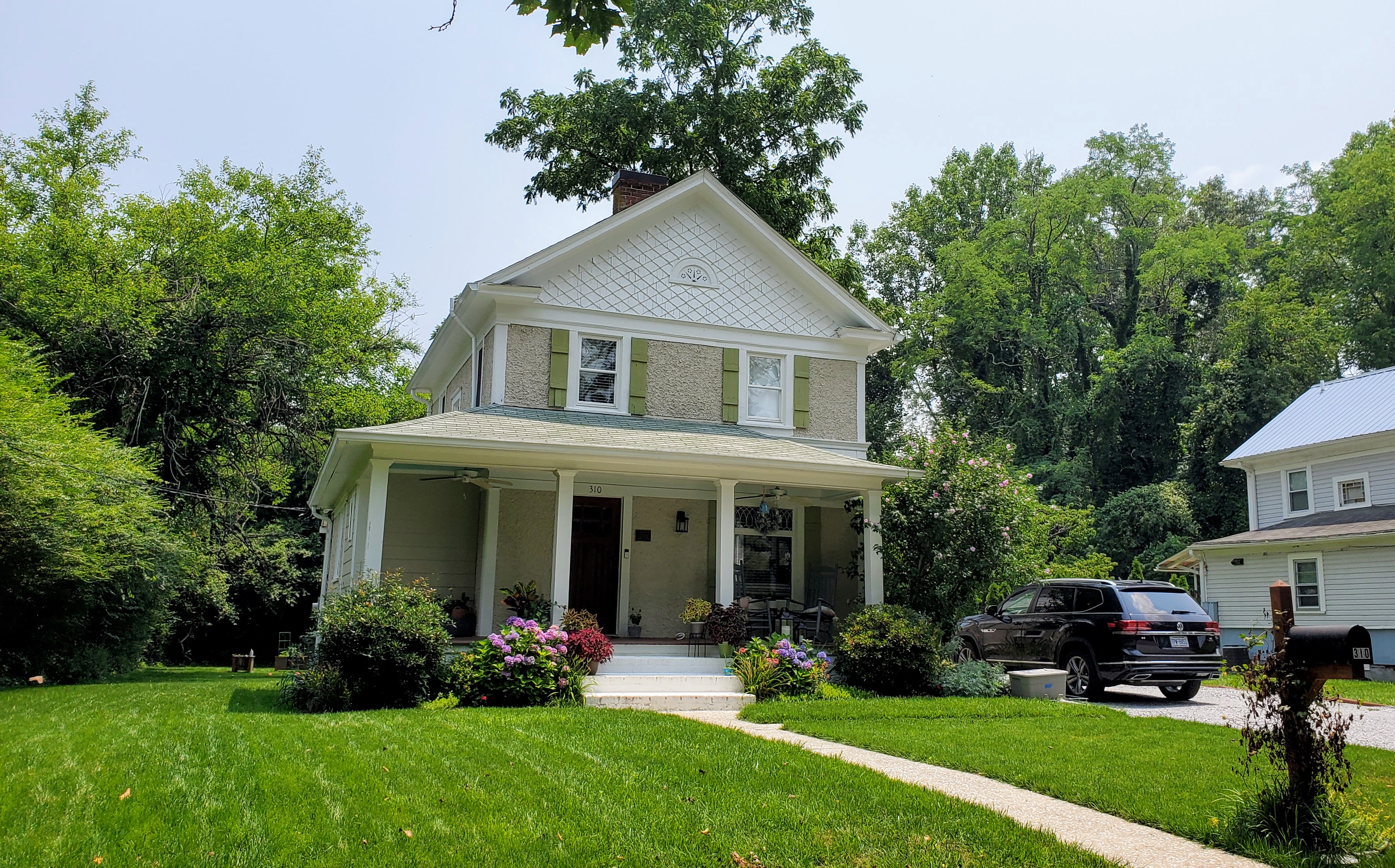
310 Rose Street, 2021

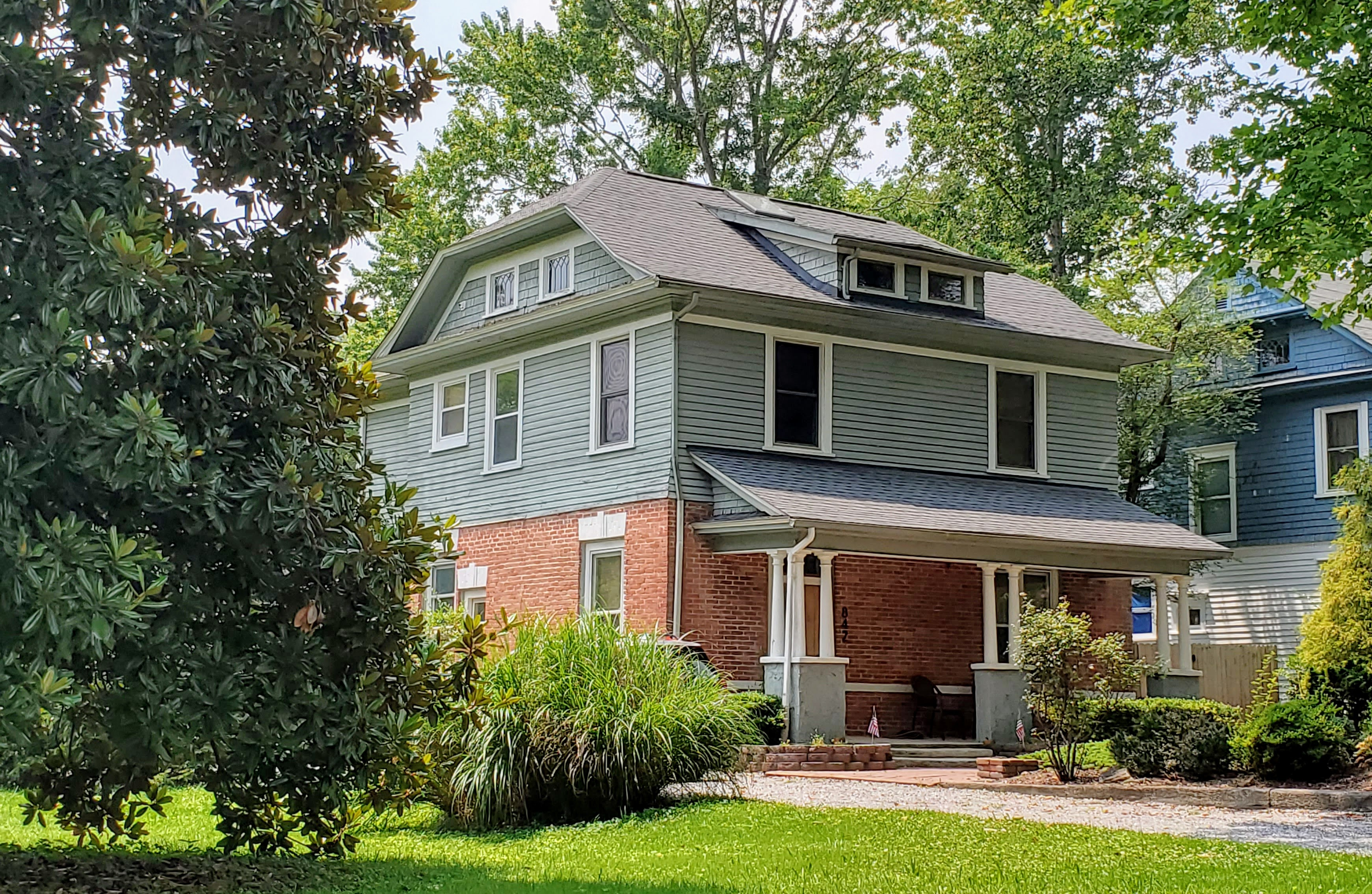
842 Dale Street, 2021

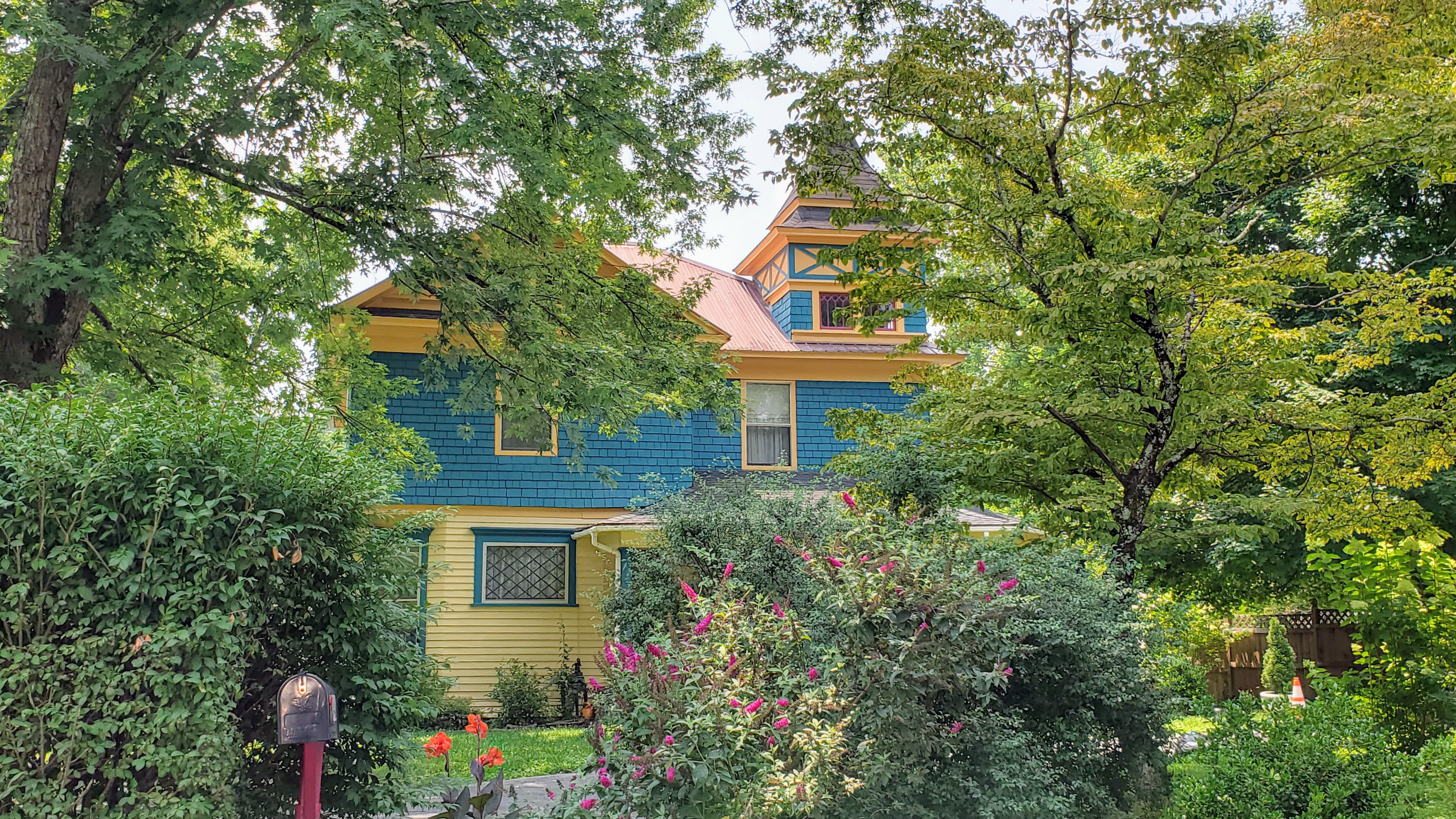
848 Dale Street, 2021
