= Hendersonville, North Carolina =

- City
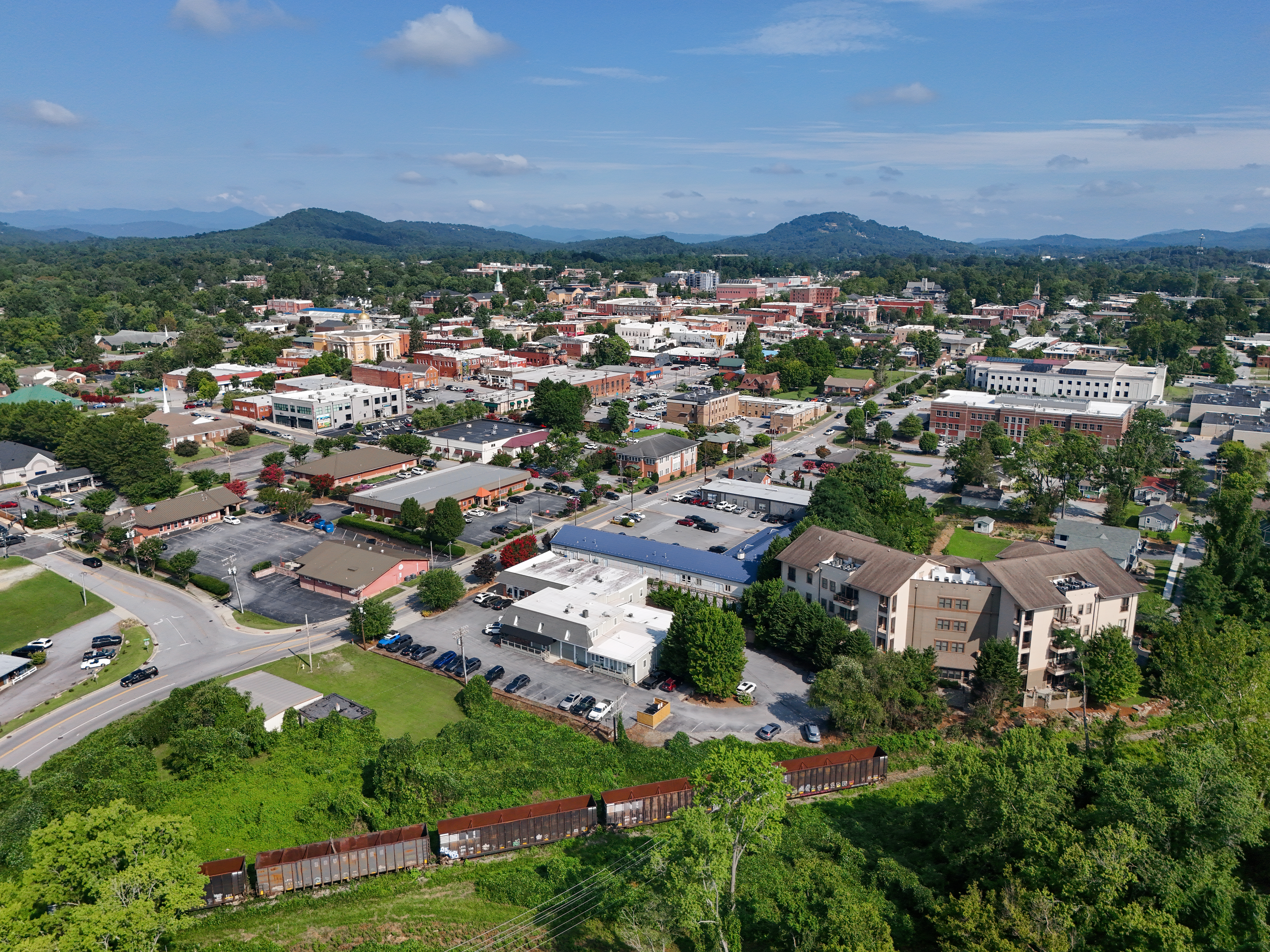
- Historic downtown Hendersonville

- Flag Seal
- Nicknames: City of Four Seasons, Hendo
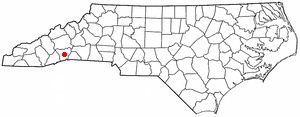
- Location of Hendersonville, North Carolina
- Coordinates: 35°19′29″N 82°27′26″W
- Country: United States
- State: North Carolina
- County: Henderson
- Incorporated: 1847
- Named for: Leonard Henderson

Government
  - Mayor: Barbara Volk

Area
  - Total: 7.44 sq mi (19.28 km^{2})
  - Land: 7.41 sq mi (19.19 km^{2})
  - Water: 0.035 sq mi (0.09 km^{2})
- Elevation: 2,100 ft (640 m)

Population (2020)
  - Total: 15,137
  - Density: 2,043.5/sq mi (788.99/km^{2})
- Time zone: UTC−5 (Eastern (EST))
  - Summer (DST): UTC−4 (EDT)
- ZIP Codes: 28739, 28791–28792
- Area code: 828
- FIPS code: 37-30720
- GNIS feature ID: 2404685
- Website: www.hendersonvillenc.gov

Hendersonville is a city in and the county seat of Henderson County, North Carolina, United States, located 22 miles (35 km) south of Asheville. Like the county, the city is named for 19th-century North Carolina Supreme Court Chief Justice Leonard Henderson.

As of the 2020 census, Hendersonville had a population of 15,137.

== Introduction ==
Prior to the Treaty of Hopewell, the land that now is occupied by Hendersonville was settled by Cherokee tribes. Following this treaty, white settlers entered the region, eventually taking the land of what is now Henderson County in full from the original inhabitants. Poor trade links still restricted economic and demographic growth in the region, until the development of the Buncombe Turnpike, completed in 1827. Wealthy low-country planters started to migrate to the area, building summer homes and bringing lots of money with them. In response to this population growth, Henderson County was split off from Buncombe County and founded in 1838.

Judge Mitchell King owned 1,000 acres (4.0 km^{2}), of which he donated 50 acres for the establishment of the town of Hendersonville. He used some of the enslaved African Americans he owned as workers to lay out its 100-foot-wide (30 m) Main Street.

Formed in 1838 and chartered in 1847 as the county seat of Henderson County, Hendersonville is traditionally known as "The City of Four Seasons". The town has a well-preserved Main Street and adjoining downtown areas with many restaurants, antique shops and boutiques in buildings that housed key local businesses until the mid-1980s. At that point some businesses moved to suburban or highway locations, or were put out of business by big box competition. The town's architecture reflects the late 19th and early 20th centuries. Much downtown revitalization has occurred since the early 1990s.

Larger stores have been developed almost entirely along the commercial strips extending outward from the downtown along U.S. Highway 64 east and U.S. Highways 176 and 25. There are historic neighborhoods outside the Main Street corridor, including the 5th Avenue neighborhood on the city's west side and the Druid Hills neighborhood north of downtown. Depressed areas are found along the city's east side, but redevelopment efforts are underway in the historic commercial district along 7th Avenue East.

The architectural focus of the downtown area is the historic Henderson County Courthouse, completed in 1905 and completely renovated in 2008. The newly restored City Hall (erected 1924) and the modern Henderson County Courthouse (1995) are also located downtown.

The largest street festival of the Hendersonville calendar is the annual North Carolina Apple Festival, culminating in the Apple Parade that regularly draws up to 50,000 spectators. Main Street is home to other festivals and special activities throughout the year.

High schools in the city and surrounding area include Hendersonville High School, West Henderson High School, North Henderson High School, and East Henderson High School.

== Geography ==
Hendersonville is located at the center of Henderson County, in the southern mountains of western North Carolina near the Eastern Escarpment.

Interstate 26 runs through the eastern side of the city, with access from Exit 49. U.S. Routes 25 and 74 run concurrently with I-26. The freeway leads north 22 miles (35 km) to Asheville and southeast 46 miles (74 km) to Spartanburg, South Carolina. Interstate 26 also provides direct access to the Asheville Regional Airport (AVL), which features scheduled passenger airline service operated by several major air carriers. U.S. Route 25 Business passes through the center of Hendersonville on King Street northbound and Church Street southbound. U.S. Route 64 (6th Avenue) also passes through the center of Hendersonville, leading northeast 14 miles (23 km) to Bat Cave and west 20 miles (32 km) to Brevard. U.S. Route 176 (Spartanburg Highway) leads southeast 10 miles (16 km) to Saluda.

According to the United States Census Bureau, Hendersonville has a total area of 6.9 square miles (18.0 km^{2}), of which 0.03 square miles (0.07 km^{2}), or 0.40%, is water. Mud Creek, a north-flowing tributary of the French Broad River and part of the Tennessee River watershed, is the watercourse through the city, passing east of downtown.

=== Climate ===
Climate data for Hendersonville 1 NE, North Carolina (1991–2020 normals, extremes 1898–present)
Month	Jan	Feb	Mar	Apr	May	Jun	Jul	Aug	Sep	Oct	Nov	Dec	Year
Record high °F (°C)	79 (26)	84 (29)	88 (31)	91 (33)	94 (34)	98 (37)	100 (38)	101 (38)	98 (37)	92 (33)	81 (27)	77 (25)	101 (38)
Mean daily maximum °F (°C)	48.1 (8.9)	52.2 (11.2)	58.9 (14.9)	68.3 (20.2)	75.4 (24.1)	81.5 (27.5)	84.5 (29.2)	82.8 (28.2)	77.5 (25.3)	68.6 (20.3)	58.7 (14.8)	50.7 (10.4)	67.3 (19.6)
Daily mean °F (°C)	37.3 (2.9)	40.6 (4.8)	46.8 (8.2)	55.5 (13.1)	63.7 (17.6)	70.7 (21.5)	74.2 (23.4)	72.8 (22.7)	67.0 (19.4)	56.6 (13.7)	46.5 (8.1)	39.9 (4.4)	56.0 (13.3)
Mean daily minimum °F (°C)	26.5 (−3.1)	28.9 (−1.7)	34.7 (1.5)	42.8 (6.0)	52.0 (11.1)	59.8 (15.4)	63.9 (17.7)	62.7 (17.1)	56.4 (13.6)	44.6 (7.0)	34.3 (1.3)	29.1 (−1.6)	44.6 (7.0)
Record low °F (°C)	−14 (−26)	−9 (−23)	−2 (−19)	16 (−9)	20 (−7)	35 (2)	45 (7)	40 (4)	30 (−1)	17 (−8)	−2 (−19)	−4 (−20)	−14 (−26)
Average precipitation inches (mm)	5.28 (134)	4.26 (108)	4.95 (126)	4.84 (123)	4.40 (112)	4.95 (126)	5.79 (147)	5.73 (146)	4.97 (126)	4.06 (103)	4.55 (116)	5.27 (134)	59.05 (1,500)
Average snowfall inches (cm)	2.9 (7.4)	0.6 (1.5)	1.0 (2.5)	0.0 (0.0)	0.0 (0.0)	0.0 (0.0)	0.0 (0.0)	0.0 (0.0)	0.0 (0.0)	0.0 (0.0)	0.1 (0.25)	2.1 (5.3)	6.7 (17)
Average precipitation days (≥ 0.01 in)	10.2	8.6	10.6	10.0	10.5	11.4	13.0	12.5	9.0	7.6	8.1	9.7	121.2
Average snowy days (≥ 0.1 in)	0.8	0.4	0.3	0.0	0.0	0.0	0.0	0.0	0.0	0.0	0.1	0.6	2.2
Source: NOAA

== Demographics ==
Historical population
Census	Pop.	Note	%±
1860	1,740		—
1870	278		−84.0%
1880	554		99.3%
1890	1,216		119.5%
1900	1,917		57.6%
1910	2,818		47.0%
1920	3,729		32.3%
1930	5,070		36.0%
1940	5,381		6.1%
1950	6,103		13.4%
1960	5,911		−3.1%
1970	6,443		9.0%
1980	6,862		6.5%
1990	7,284		6.1%
2000	10,420		43.1%
2010	13,137		26.1%
2020	15,137		15.2%
2025 (est.)	15,867	▲	4.8%
U.S. Decennial Census

=== 2020 census ===
Hendersonville racial composition
Race	Number	Percentage
White (non-Hispanic)	10,966	72.45%
Black or African American (non-Hispanic)	1,059	7.0%
Native American	30	0.2%
Asian	185	1.22%
Pacific Islander	35	0.23%
Other/Mixed	582	3.84%
Hispanic or Latino	2,280	15.06%

As of the 2020 census, Hendersonville had a population of 15,137. There were 7,472 households and 3,339 families residing in the city.

The median age was 49.9 years. 16.8% of residents were under the age of 18 and 32.7% were 65 years of age or older. For every 100 females, there were 80.5 males, and for every 100 females age 18 and over, there were 76.8 males age 18 and over.

100.0% of residents lived in urban areas, while 0.0% lived in rural areas.

Of all households, 19.1% had children under the age of 18 living in them, 32.8% were married-couple households, 19.1% were households with a male householder and no spouse or partner present, and 42.0% were households with a female householder and no spouse or partner present. About 44.6% of all households were made up of individuals, and 27.0% had someone living alone who was 65 years of age or older.

There were 8,371 housing units, of which 10.7% were vacant. The homeowner vacancy rate was 1.8% and the rental vacancy rate was 7.7%.

=== 2010 census ===
As of the 2010 census, the city population was 13,137.

In 1900, 1,967 persons lived in Hendersonville; in 1910, 2818; and in 1940, 5381 people lived here.

=== 2000 census ===
As of the census of 2000, there were 13,137 people across 5,920 households in the city. The population density was 2,189.5 inhabitants per square mile (845.4/km^{2}). There were 5,181 housing units at an average density of 870.0 per square mile (335.9/km^{2}). The racial composition of the city was 81.44% White, 12.54% Black or African American, 9.09% Hispanic or Latino American, 0.73% Asian American, 0.28% Native American, 0.01% Native Hawaiian or Other Pacific Islander, 3.48% some other race, and 1.52% two or more races.

There were 4,579 households, out of which 20.7% had children under the age of 18 living with them, 39.6% were married couples living together, 12.9% had a female householder with no husband present, and 44.2% were non-families. 40.1% of all households were made up of individuals, and 22.1% had someone living alone who was 65 years of age or older. The average household size was 2.10 and the average family size was 2.80.

In the city, the population was spread out, with 28.9% under the age of 18, 17.5% from 18 to 24, 22.8% from 25 to 44, 19.3% from 45 to 64, and 23.2% who were 65 years of age or older. The median age was 45 years. For every 100 females, there were 82.8 males. For every 100 females age 18 and over, there were 76.6 males.

The median income for a household in the city was $30,357, and the median income for a family was $39,111. Males had a median income of $30,458 versus $22,770 for females. The per capita income for the city was $19,926. About 13.3% of families and 16.8% of the population were below the poverty line, including 27.5% of those under age 18 and 10.5% of those age 65 or over.

== Museums and historical sites ==
The Mineral and Lapidary Museum of Henderson County, located at 400 North Main Street in downtown Hendersonville, has giant geodes, a Tyrannosaurus skull, minerals, and dinosaur eggs on display. The same building is home to the Henderson County Genealogical and Historical Society. Entry to both parts of the ornate building is free.

Down the road at 318 North Main Street is Hands On!, a children's museum of "educational exhibits that stimulate the imagination and motivate learning in a fun, safe, 'hands-on' environment." Admission is $10 per child or adult.

The Henderson County Heritage Museum, in the 1905 county courthouse at One Historic Courthouse Square, features a gallery of regional Carolina history. It sits in the heart of the Main Street Historic District. Admission is free.

To the east of Main Street is the 1902-16 Hendersonville Rail Road Station, at 7th Avenue and Maple Street in the Seventh Avenue Depot District. The Southern Railway opened the line in 1879. Passenger rail service on the line ended in 1968.

To the west of Main Street along U.S. Route 64 is Oakdale Cemetery. It includes the Italian marble angel statue that served as the inspiration for Thomas Wolfe's first novel, Look Homeward, Angel (1929).

North of Main Street is the Historic Johnson Farm at 3346 Haywood Road. The 1878 tobacco farm served as a summer retreat for tourists as early as the 1920s. Admission is free, while guided tours are $2 and $3.

East of Hendersonville at 170 Stepp Orchard Drive is Stepp's Hillcrest Orchard, a fourth-generation family-owned apple orchard and agritourism destination. Founded as one of Henderson County's earliest pick-your-own orchards, the farm offers seasonal apple, pumpkin, grape, flower, and tulip picking, the farm also offers seasonal events, photography sessions, and festivals. Stepp's orchard is open seasonally and is a popular destination during Henderson County's apple season.

The Western North Carolina Air Museum (FAA LID: 8NC9), featuring airplanes of a bygone era, is near the small Hendersonville Airport (FAA LID: 0A7) at the corner of Gilbert Street and Brooklyn Avenue between Hendersonville and East Flat Rock. Admission is free.

5 miles (8 km) west of downtown Hendersonville in the town of Laurel Park is Jump Off Rock atop Jump Off Mountain. This overlook provides a panorama of the Pisgah and Blue Ridge mountains. Laurel Park town park; free admission during daylight hours.

For additional sites, see the National Register of Historic Places listings in Henderson County, North Carolina. In addition to the Henderson County Courthouse, Historic Johnson Farm, Main Street Historic District, Oakdale Cemetery, and Seventh Avenue Depot District, the Aloah Hotel, The Cedars, Chewning House, Clarke-Hobbs-Davidson House, Cold Spring Park Historic District, Mary Mills Coxe House, Druid Hills Historic District, Grey Hosiery Mill, Hyman Heights-Mount Royal Historic District, Kanuga Lake Historic District, King-Waldrop House, Lenox Park Historic District, Reese House, Clough H. Rice House, Smith-Williams-Durham Boarding House, Erle Stillwell House, Erle Stillwell House II, The Waverly, and West Side Historic District are listed on the National Register of Historic Places.

Hendersonville Little Theatre was established in 1966. It moved from its original location to a unique red barn on State Street. After many successful years at that site, in 2012 it moved to an old stone church at 220 S. Washington Street downtown.

== Companies ==
Clothing retailer BonWorth was founded in Hendersonville in 1976. Sierra Nevada opened a brewery in 2014.

== Healthcare ==
Hospitals in Hendersonville include AdventHealth Hendersonville and UNC Health Pardee.

== Media ==
The metro area has several TV broadcasting stations that serve the Greenville-Spartanburg-Asheville Designated Market Area (DMA) as defined by Nielsen Media Research.

The station nearest to Hendersonville is the Asheville-based WLOS (ABC), television channel 13. Other major TV broadcasters include WYFF, WSPA, WHNS, and WUNF. WMYI 102.5, is the only radio station that broadcasts in Hendersonville. Additionally, most Asheville and some Greenville/Spartanburg stations come in with a local sound quality.

Hendersonville's only daily newspaper is the Times-News. The Hendersonville Lightning, founded in April 2012 by Bill Moss, is a weekly newspaper.

== Notable people ==
- Madison Cawthorn (born 1995) – one-term Congressman for North Carolina's 11th congressional district
- Shirley Danz (1926–2018) – All-American Girls Professional Baseball League player
- Jennifer Pharr Davis (born 1983) – long-distance hiker and conservationist
- Martin Gardner (1914–2010) – mathematics and science writer
- Sam Gash (born 1969) – professional football player and cousin of Thane Gash
- Thane Gash (born 1965) – professional football player
- Tiger Greene (born 1962) – professional football player
- Ash Gutierrez (born 2005) – musical artist
- William Dathan Holbert – serial killer
- Jim Lampley (born 1949) – sportscaster, news anchor, producer, restaurant owner
- Doug Llewelyn (born 1938) – original host of The People's Court
- Mickey Marvin (1955–2017) – professional football player
- Kelly McGillis (born 1957) – actress, Top Gun, Witness
- The McGuire Twins (Billy Leon McCrary, 1946–1979; Benny Loyd McCrary, 1946–2001) – "world's heaviest twins," born in Hendersonville
- Robert Morgan (born 1944) – poet, essayist, author
- Steve Penn (born 1968) – handball player who represented Team USA at the 1996 Summer Olympics
- Tommy Refenes (born 1981) – indie games designer, known for Super Meat Boy and other Flash-style games
- Christoph Sanders (born 1988) – actor, the lead ("Kyle Anderson") in ABC's and then Fox Television's Last Man Standing from 2011 to 2021; worked at nearby Flat Rock Playhouse and studied at Blue Ridge Community College, both in Henderson County, N.C.
- Charles Stanley (1932-2023) – pastor at Fruitland Baptist Church in Hendersonville from 1957–59; later became pastor of First Baptist Church of Atlanta and former president of the Southern Baptist Convention

== Sister cities ==
Hendersonville has two sister cities, as designated by Sister Cities International:

- Almuñécar, Granada, Spain
- Verbania, Verbano-Cusio-Ossola, Italy
