= King-Waldrop House =

Historic house in North Carolina, United States

- U.S. National Register of Historic Places
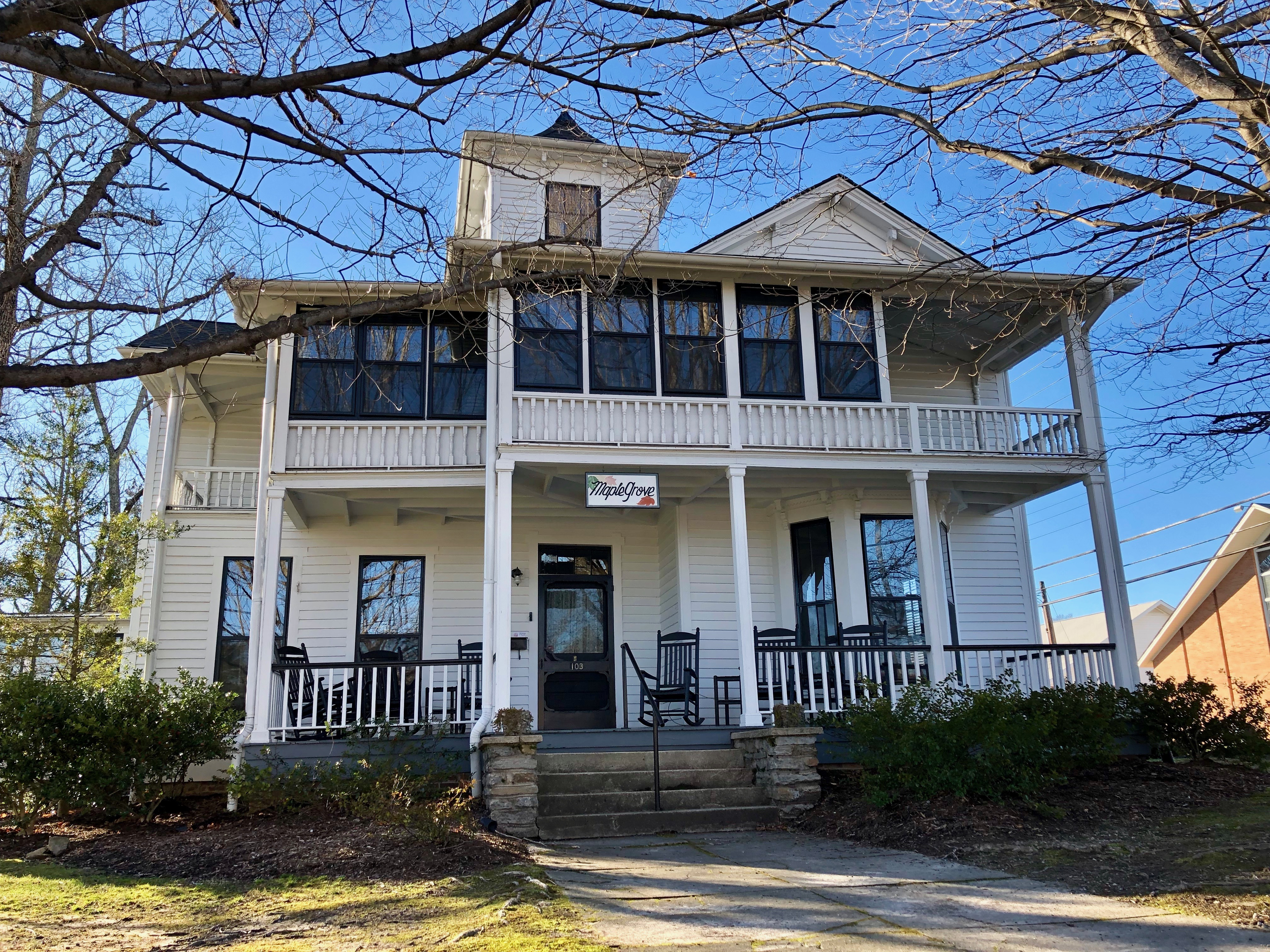
- King-Waldrop House, January 2019

- Location within North Carolina Location within the United States
- Location: 103 S. Washington St., Hendersonville, North Carolina
- Coordinates: 35°18′53″N 82°27′45″W
- Area: 0.5 acres (0.20 ha)
- Built: c. 1881
- Architectural style: Italianate, Queen Anne
- MPS: Hendersonville MPS
- NRHP reference No.: 89000030
- Added to NRHP: June 28, 1989

King-Waldrop House, also known as Maple Grove, is a historic home located at Hendersonville, Henderson County, North Carolina. It was built about 1881, and is a two-story, frame dwelling with Italianate and Queen Anne style design elements. It has a one-story rear section and a one-story wing. It features a square three-stage cupola with a concave pyramidal roof and second floor wraparound porch.

It was listed on the National Register of Historic Places in 1989.

The King-Waldrop house is currently owned by the Waldrop Family.
