= Grey Hosiery Mill =

Historic building in North Carolina, US

- U.S. National Register of Historic Places
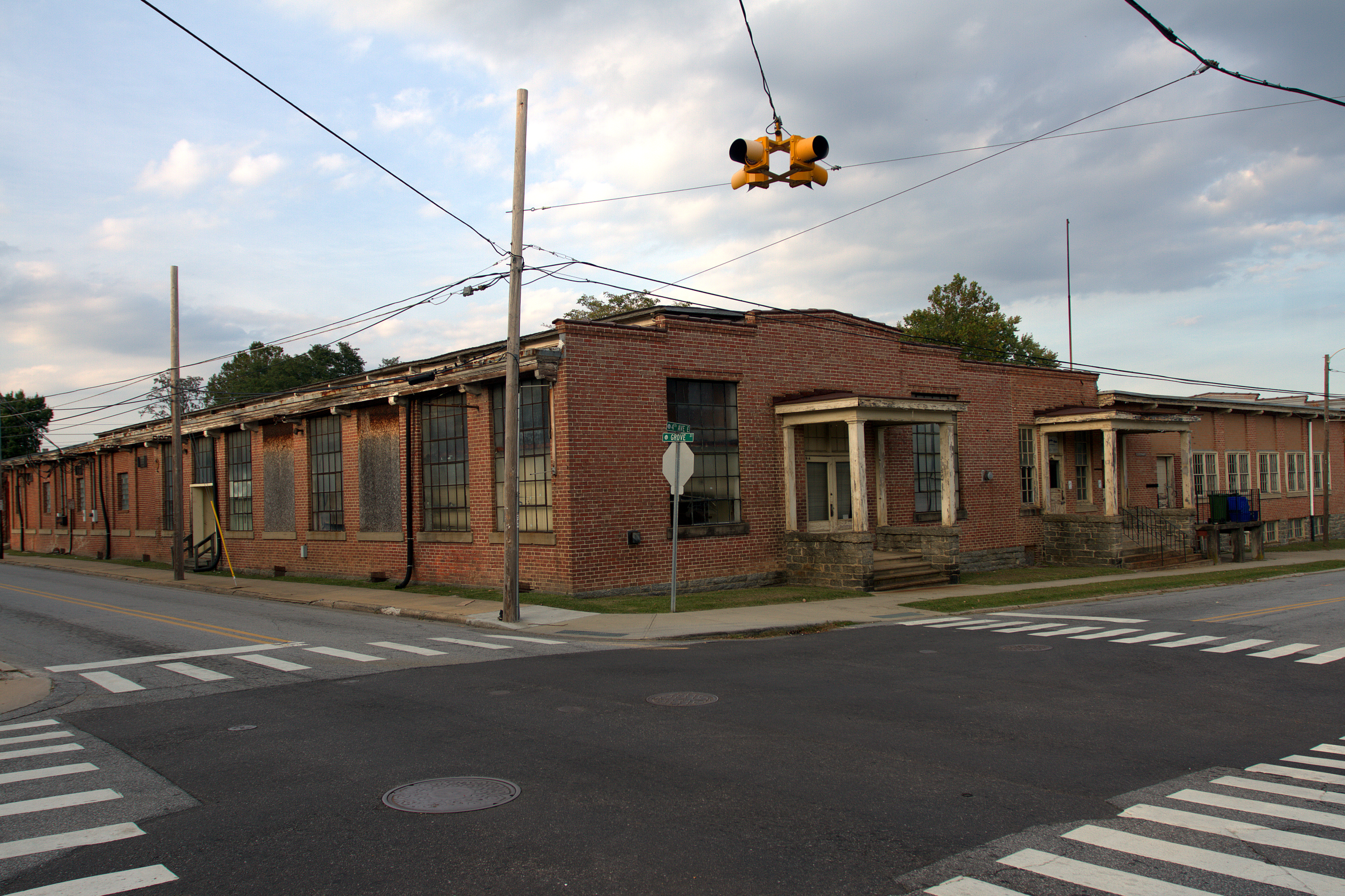
- Grey Hosiery Mill, September 2012

- Location within North Carolina Location within the United States
- Location: 301 Fourth Ave. E, Hendersonville, North Carolina
- Coordinates: 35°19′3″N 82°27′29″W
- Area: 1.6 acres (0.65 ha)
- Built: 1915
- NRHP reference No.: 00001189
- Added to NRHP: October 6, 2000

Grey Hosiery Mill, also known as Water Department-City of Hendersonville and Hold Hosiery, is a historic textile mill located at Hendersonville, Henderson County, North Carolina. It was built in 1915, with additions in 1919 and 1947. It is a one-story, brick building with large multi-pane steel sash windows and stepped gable roof with clerestory. The mill closed in 1967.

It was listed on the National Register of Historic Places in 2000.
