= The Cedars (Hendersonville, North Carolina) =

Historic hotel in North Carolina, US

- U.S. National Register of Historic Places
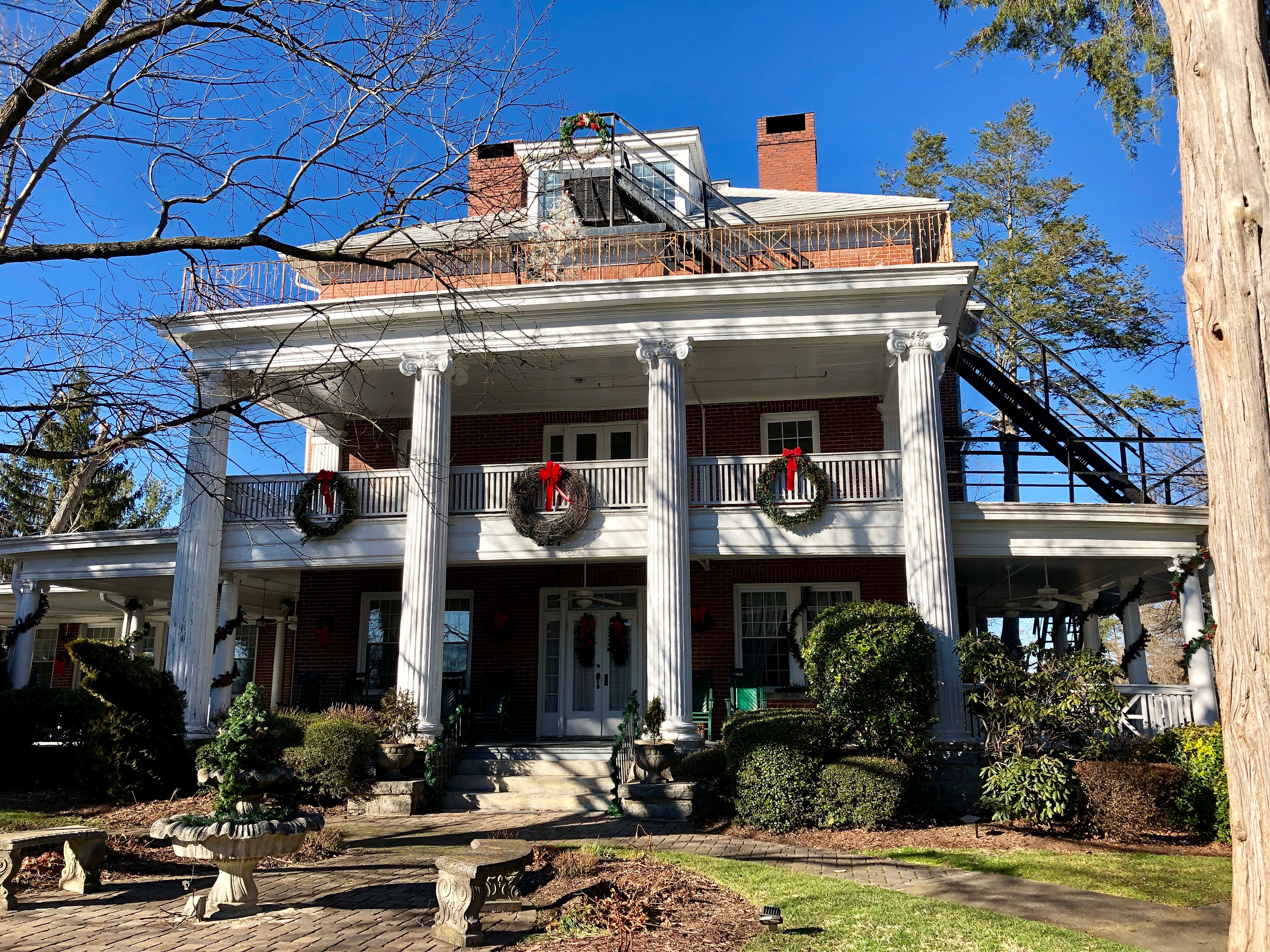
- The Cedars, January 2019

- Location within North Carolina Location within the United States
- Location: 219 7th Ave. West, Hendersonville, North Carolina
- Coordinates: 35°19′10″N 82°27′47″W
- Area: 1.2 acres (0.49 ha)
- Built: 1914
- Architectural style: Classical Revival
- MPS: Hendersonville MPS
- NRHP reference No.: 89000033
- Added to NRHP: February 24, 1989

The Cedars is a historic hotel building located at Hendersonville, Henderson County, North Carolina. It was built in 1914, and is a 3 1/2-story, Classical Revival-style brick veneer building. The front facade features a monumental tetrastyle Ionic order portico. It operated as a hotel until 1976.

It was listed on the National Register of Historic Places in 1989.
