= Seventh Avenue Depot District =

Historic district in North Carolina, United States

- U.S. National Register of Historic Places
- U.S. Historic district
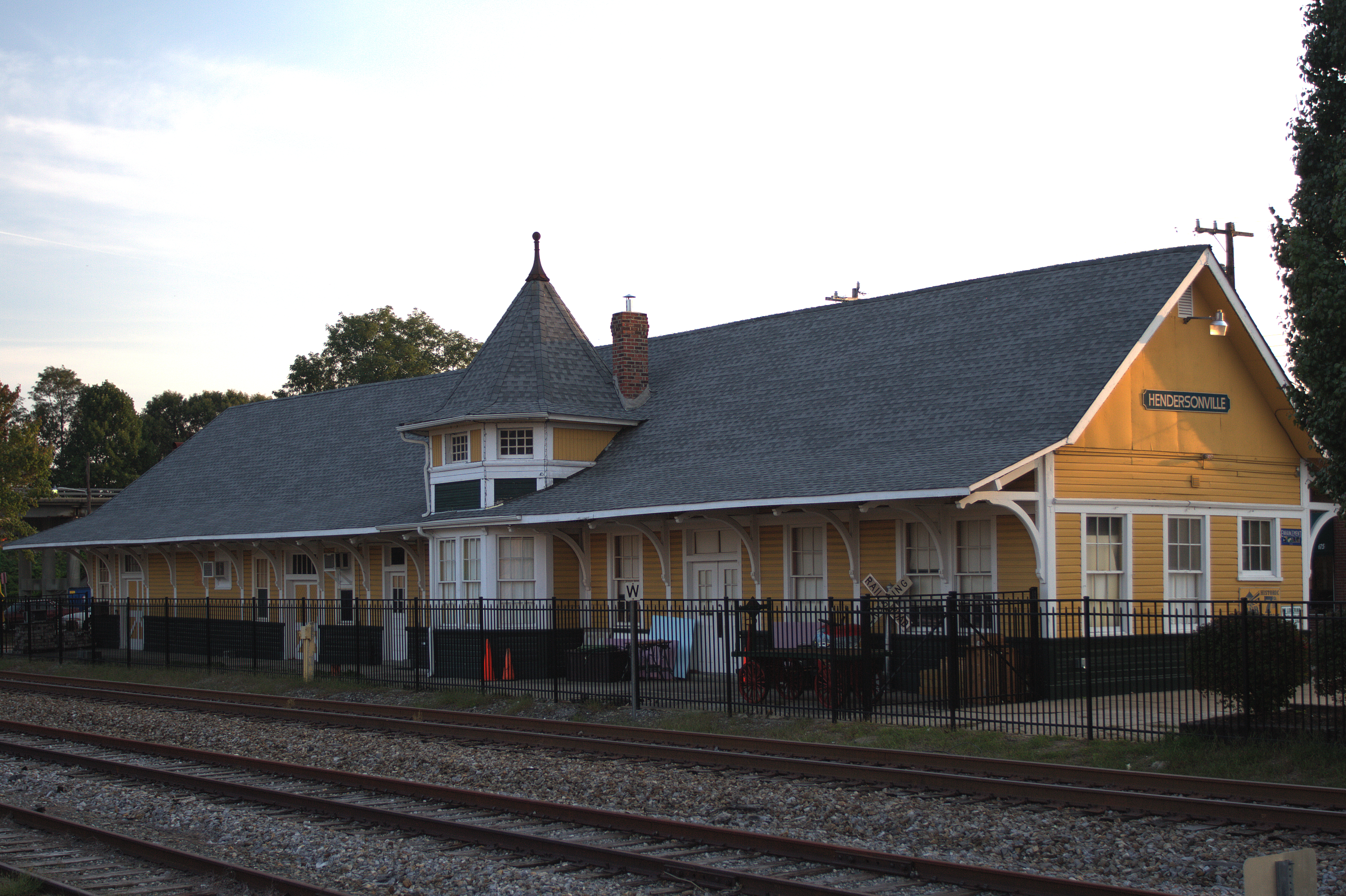
- Hendersonville Depot, September 2012

- Location within North Carolina Location within the United States
- Location: Seventh Ave. between Grove and Ash, Hendersonville, North Carolina
- Coordinates: 35°19′18″N 82°27′27″W
- Area: 10 acres (4.0 ha)
- Built: 1898
- Architectural style: Bungalow/craftsman, Queen Anne, Commercial Style
- MPS: Hendersonville MPS
- NRHP reference No.: 89000029
- Added to NRHP: March 30, 1989

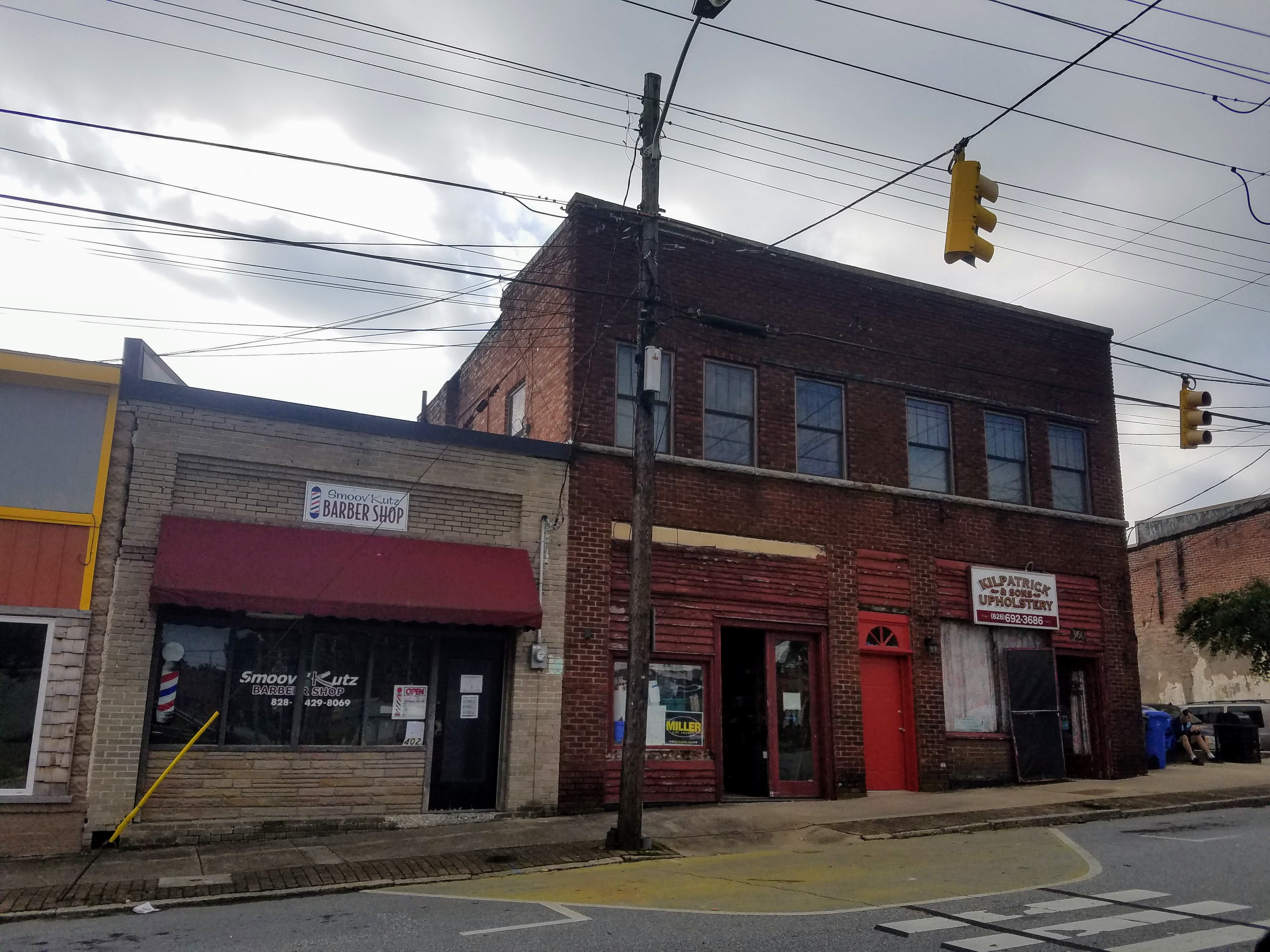
402 & 360 Seventh Street, 2020

Seventh Avenue Depot District is a national historic district located at Hendersonville, Henderson County, North Carolina. The district encompasses 27 contributing buildings and 1 contributing structure in Hendersonville. The district consists of the frame early 20th century depot, a block of original brick street pavement beside it, twenty-seven stores and warehouses, a hotel, and two houses. Notable buildings include the Queen Anne style J.W. Bailey House (c. 1898), Station Hotel (1912–1922), and American Craftsman style Hendersonville Southern Railway Depot (1902-1904).

It was listed on the National Register of Historic Places in 1989.
