= BonWorth =

American retail clothing chain

- Type: Privately held
- Industry: Retail
- Founded: 1966
- Founder: Loren Wells
- Headquarters: Hendersonville, North Carolina, United States
- Number of locations: 200+
- Area served: United States
- Products: Women's clothing

BonWorth is an American retail clothing chain based in Hendersonville, North Carolina.

Founder Loren Wells started BonWorth in 1966 in Hendersonville, and expanded throughout the 1980s. Mr. Wells, the sixth owner of Seely Castle, sold the company in 2013 and has retired to Asheville NC. By 1992, it had 65 stores in 28 states, and by 2007, it had more than 290. Its clothing lines are targeted at women 50 and older.

On August 16, 2019, BonWorth filed for Chapter 11 bankruptcy protection. In December 2022, BonWorth filed for bankruptcy once more.
