= Hyman Heights–Mount Royal Historic District =

Historic district in North Carolina, United States

- U.S. National Register of Historic Places
- U.S. Historic district
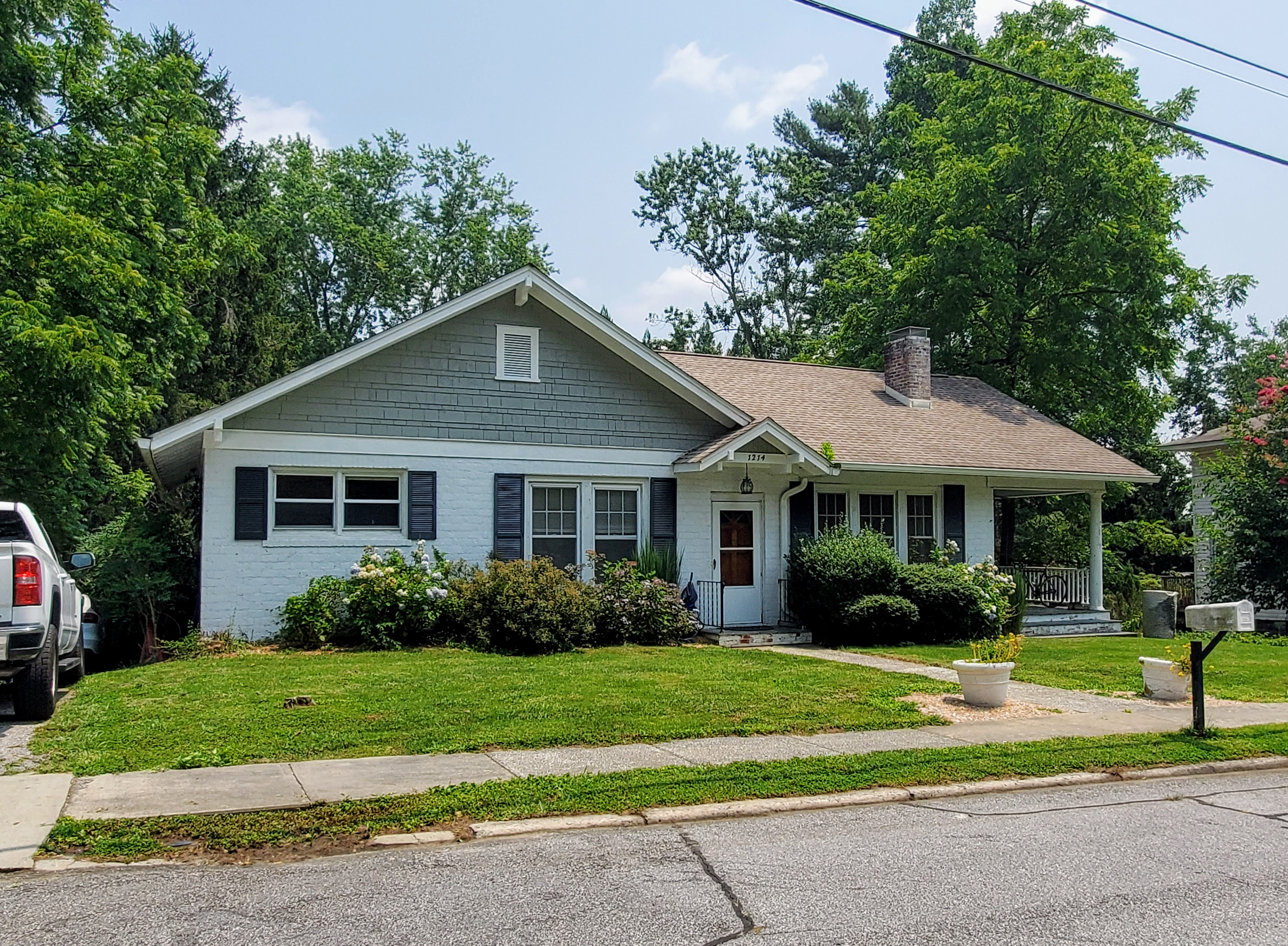
- Joseph D. Rahner House

- Location within North Carolina Location within the United States
- Location: Roughly bounded by Ridgecrest Pl., Highland Ave., Hyman Ave., Patton St., N. Main St., and Oakland St., Hendersonville, North Carolina
- Coordinates: 35°19′38″N 82°27′53″W
- Area: 40 acres (16 ha)
- Built: 1905
- Architectural style: Bungalow/craftsman, Colonial Revival, et al.
- MPS: Hendersonville MPS
- NRHP reference No.: 01000124
- Added to NRHP: February 16, 2001

Hyman Heights–Mount Royal Historic District is a national historic district located at Hendersonville, Henderson County, North Carolina. The district encompasses 123 contributing buildings in a predominantly residential section of Hendersonville developed between 1905 and 1954. It includes notable examples of Colonial Revival and Bungalow / American Craftsman residential architecture. The oldest house in the Hyman Heights–Mount Royal neighborhood is Killarney (c. 1858).

It was listed on the National Register of Historic Places in 2001.

== Gallery ==
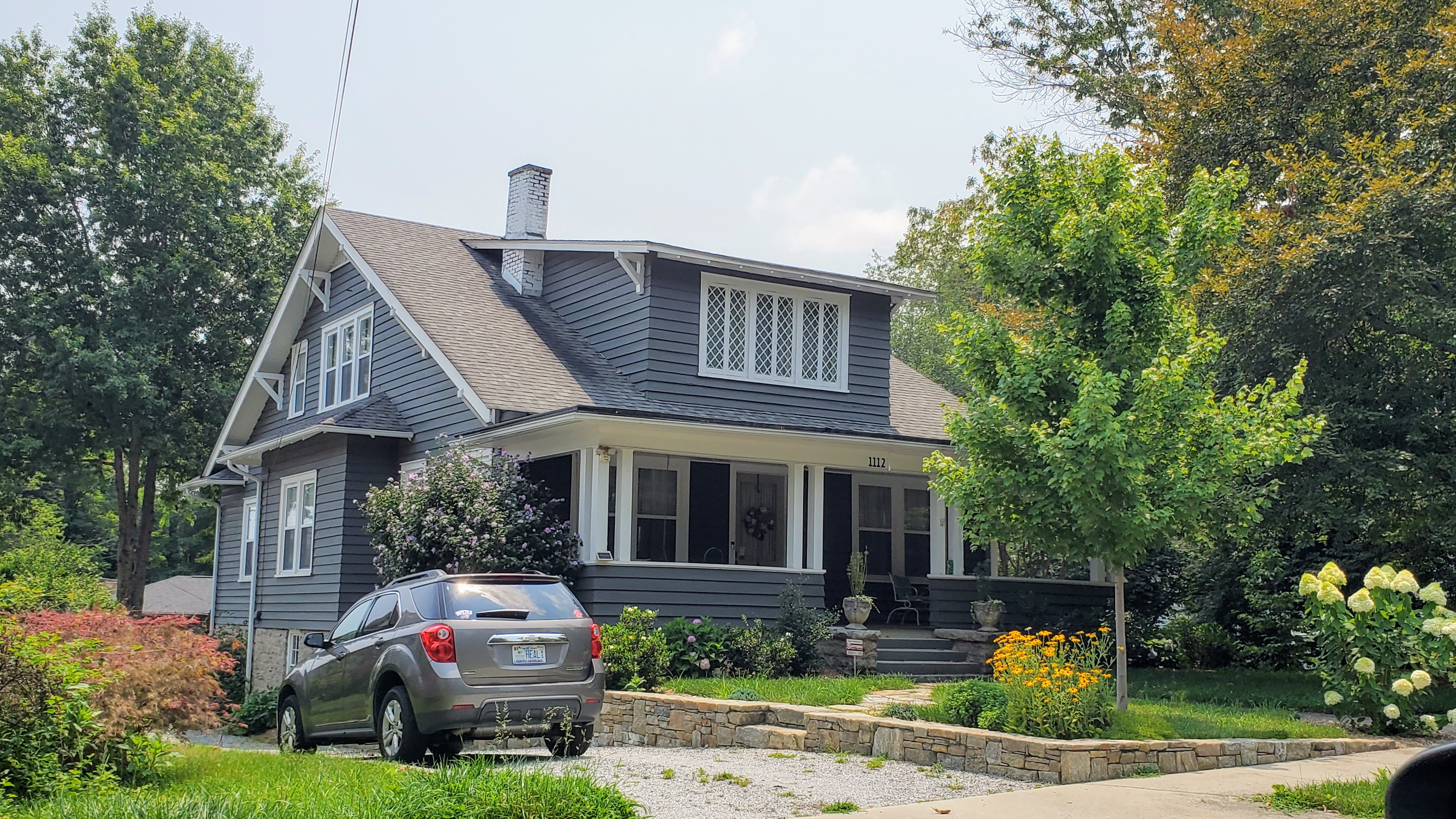
Alf A. McCall House, 2021

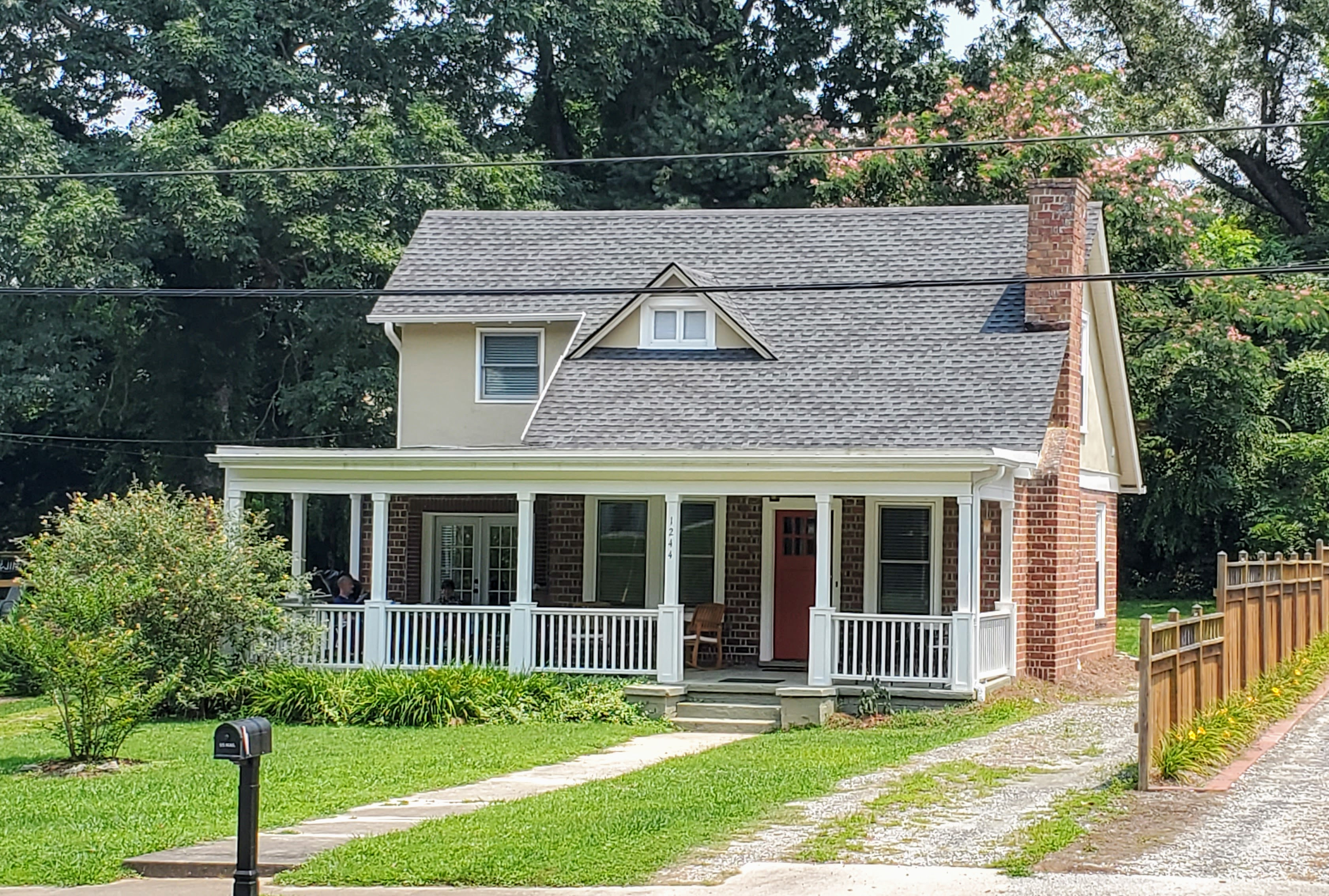
Clarence M. Benedict House, 2021

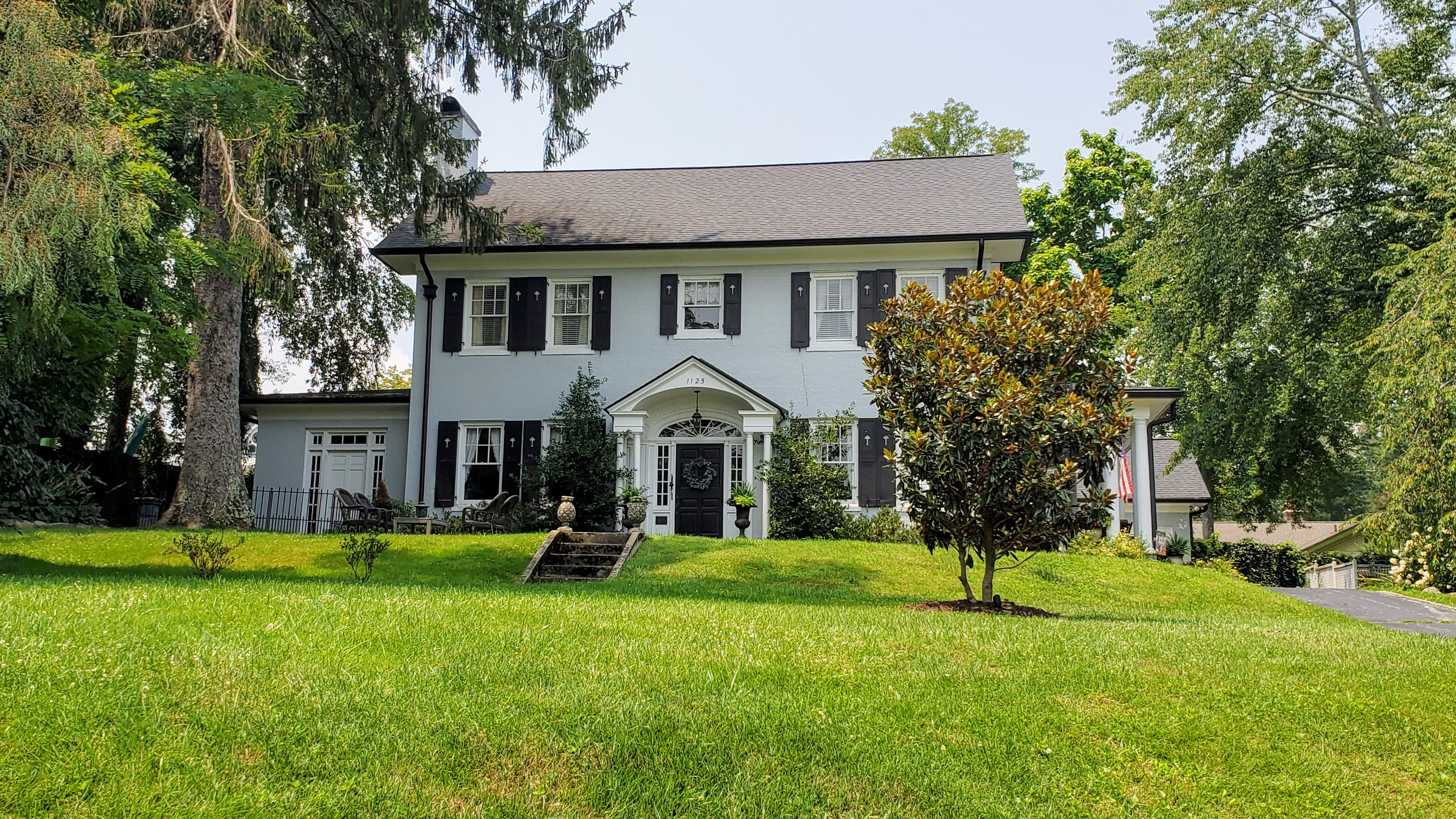
Dr. Robert Sample House, 2021

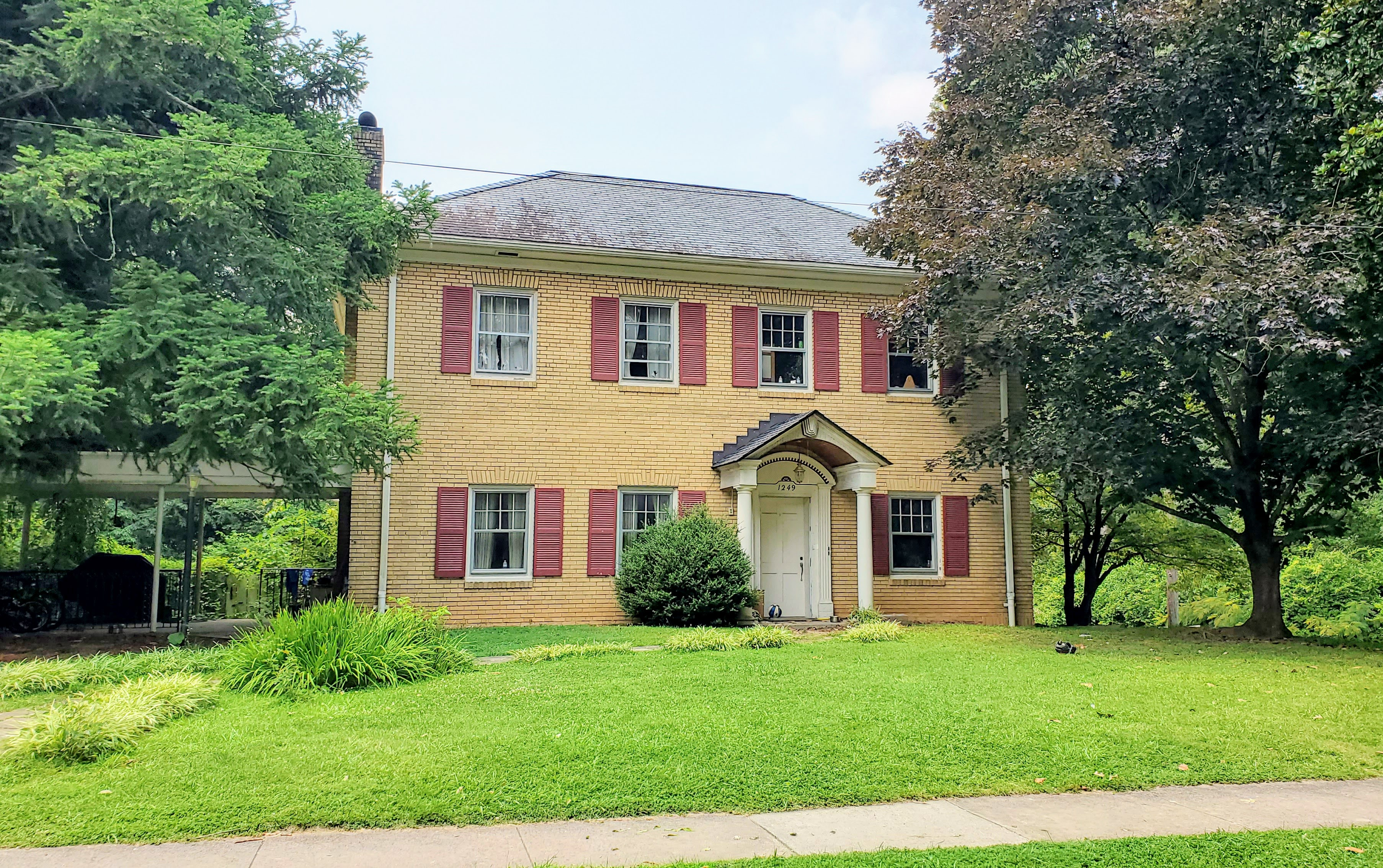
E. McQueen Salley House, 2021

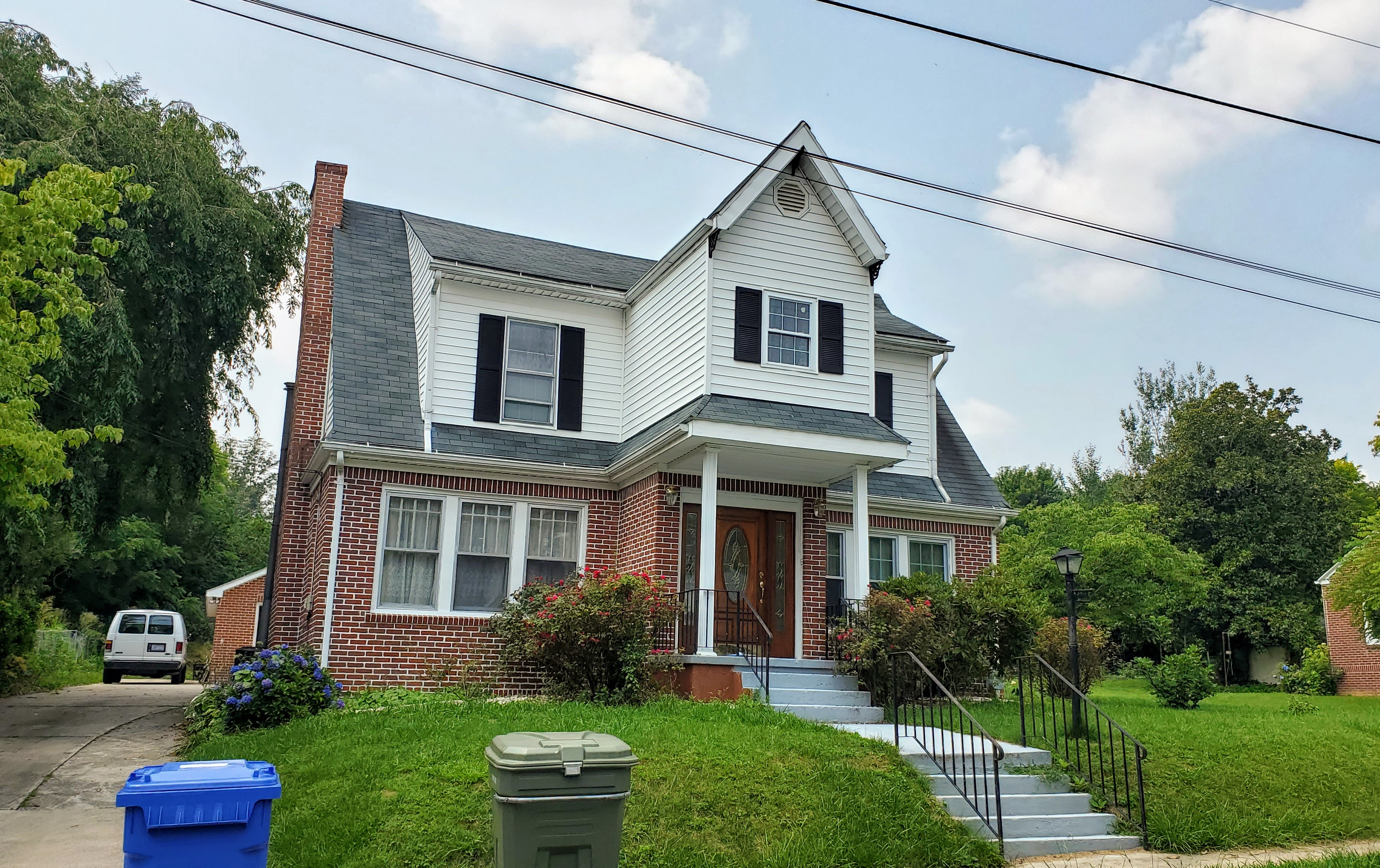
Haywood R. Faison House, 2021

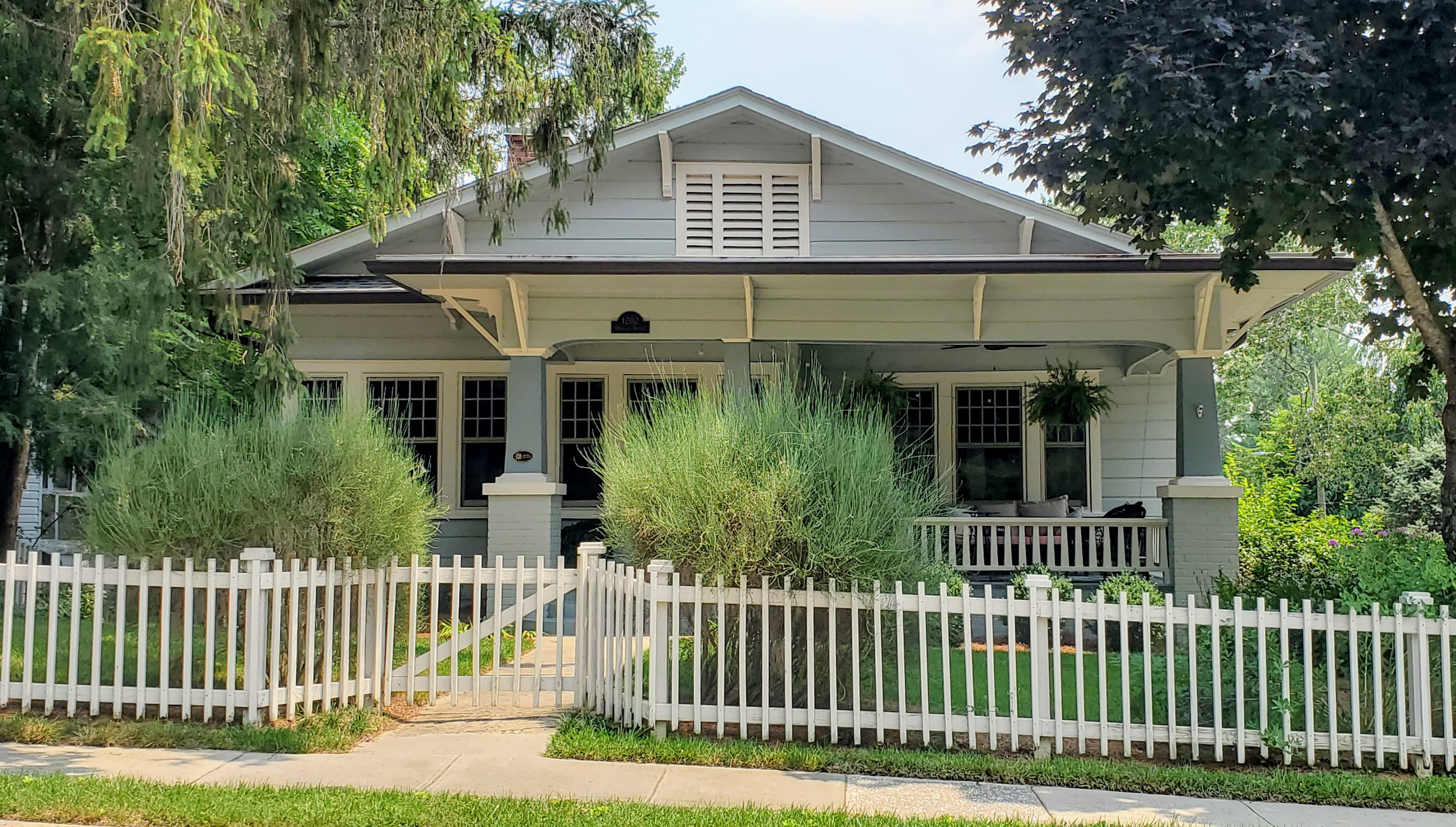
Mabel Baughman House, 2021

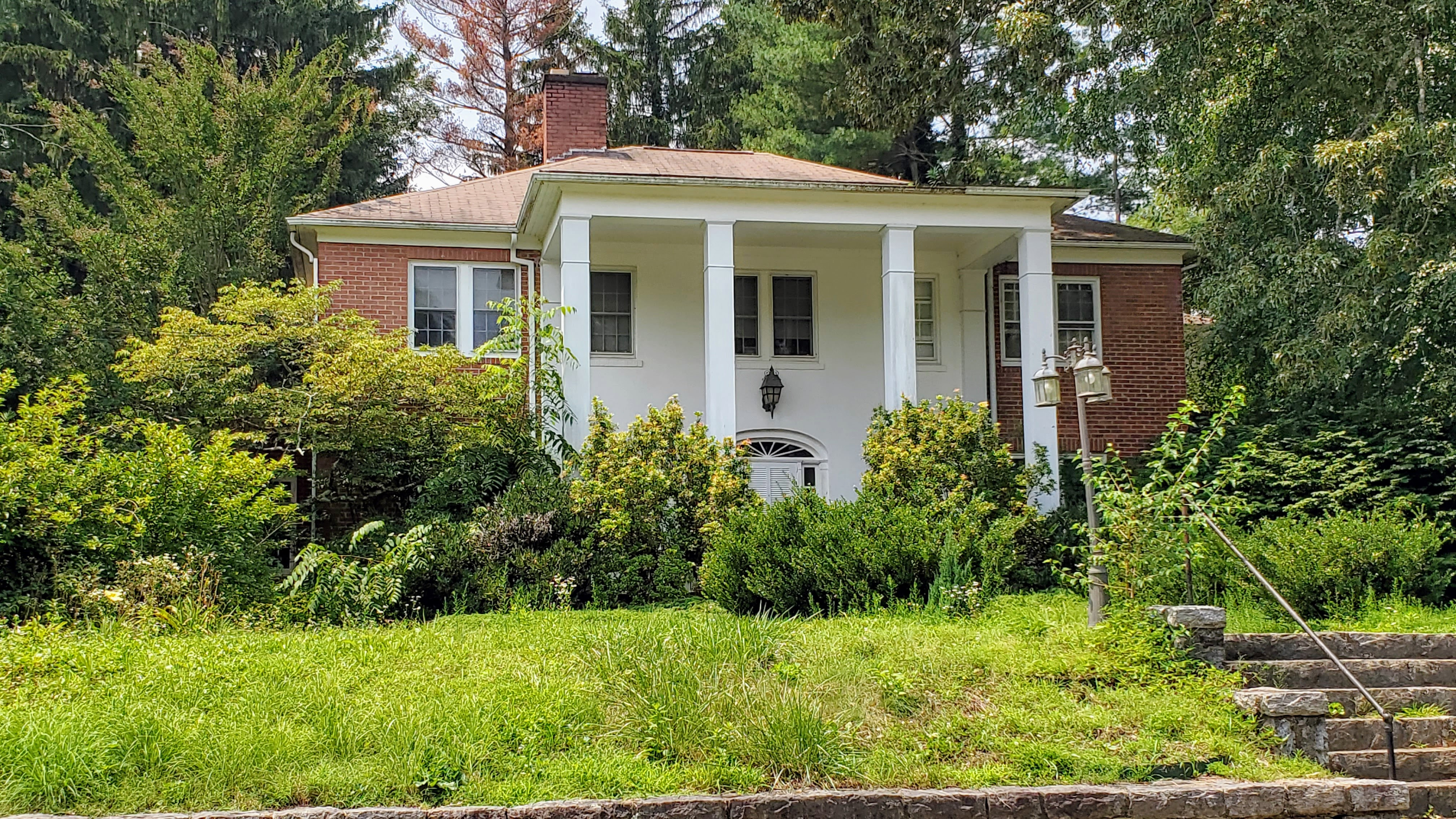
Patton Memorial Hospital Nurses' Home

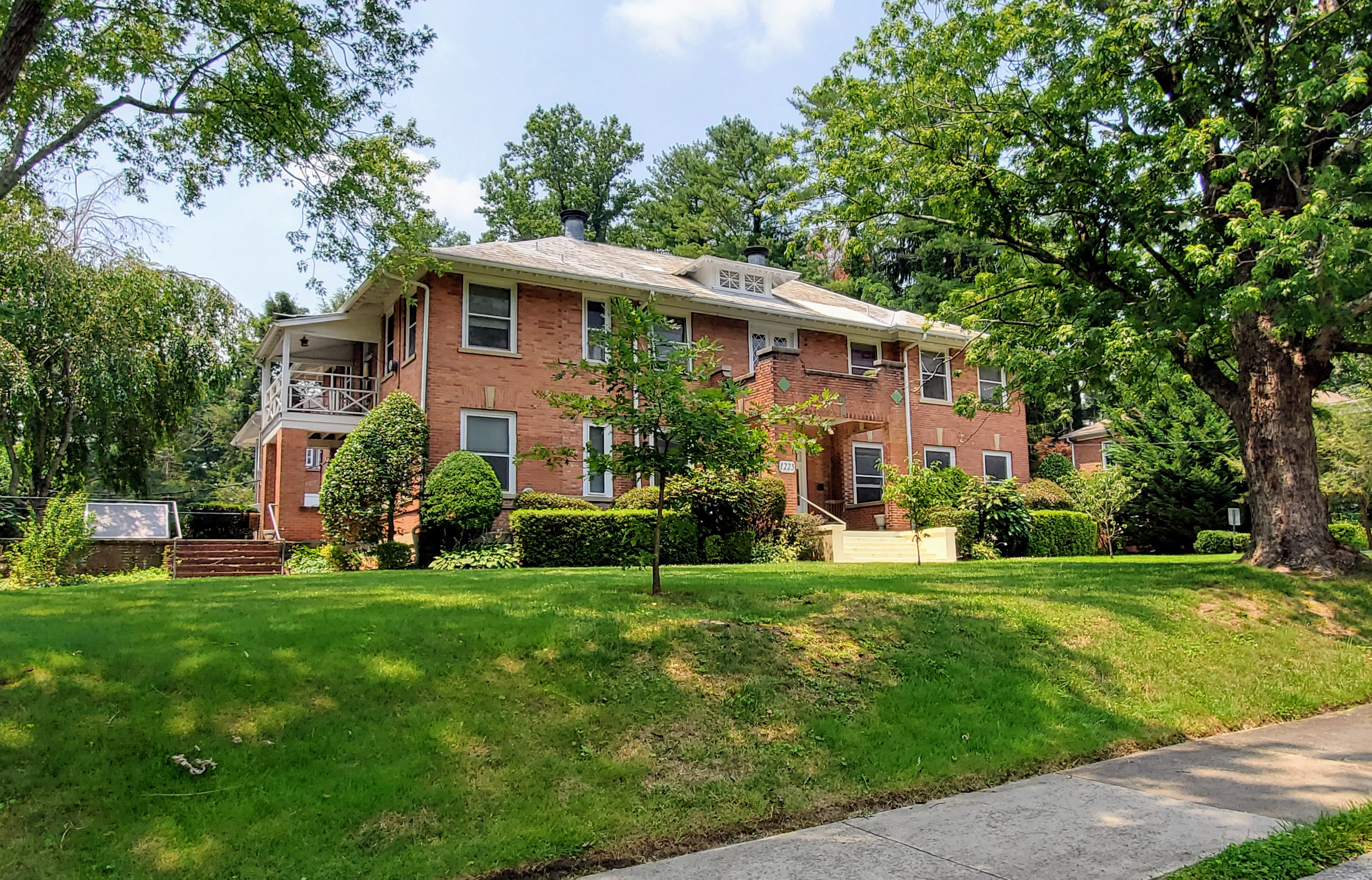
Patton Memorial Hospital, 2021

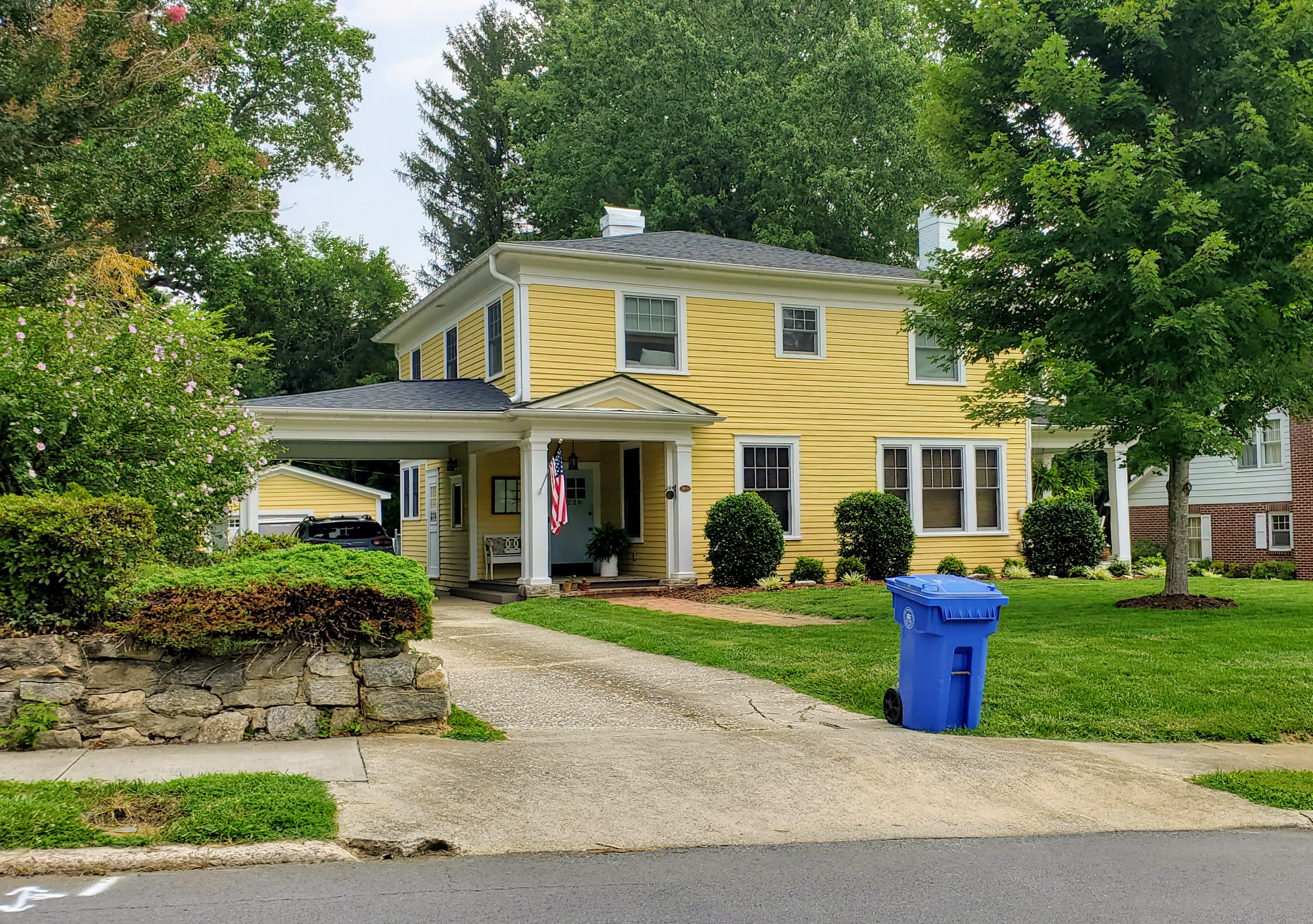
V. C. Burrowes House, 2021

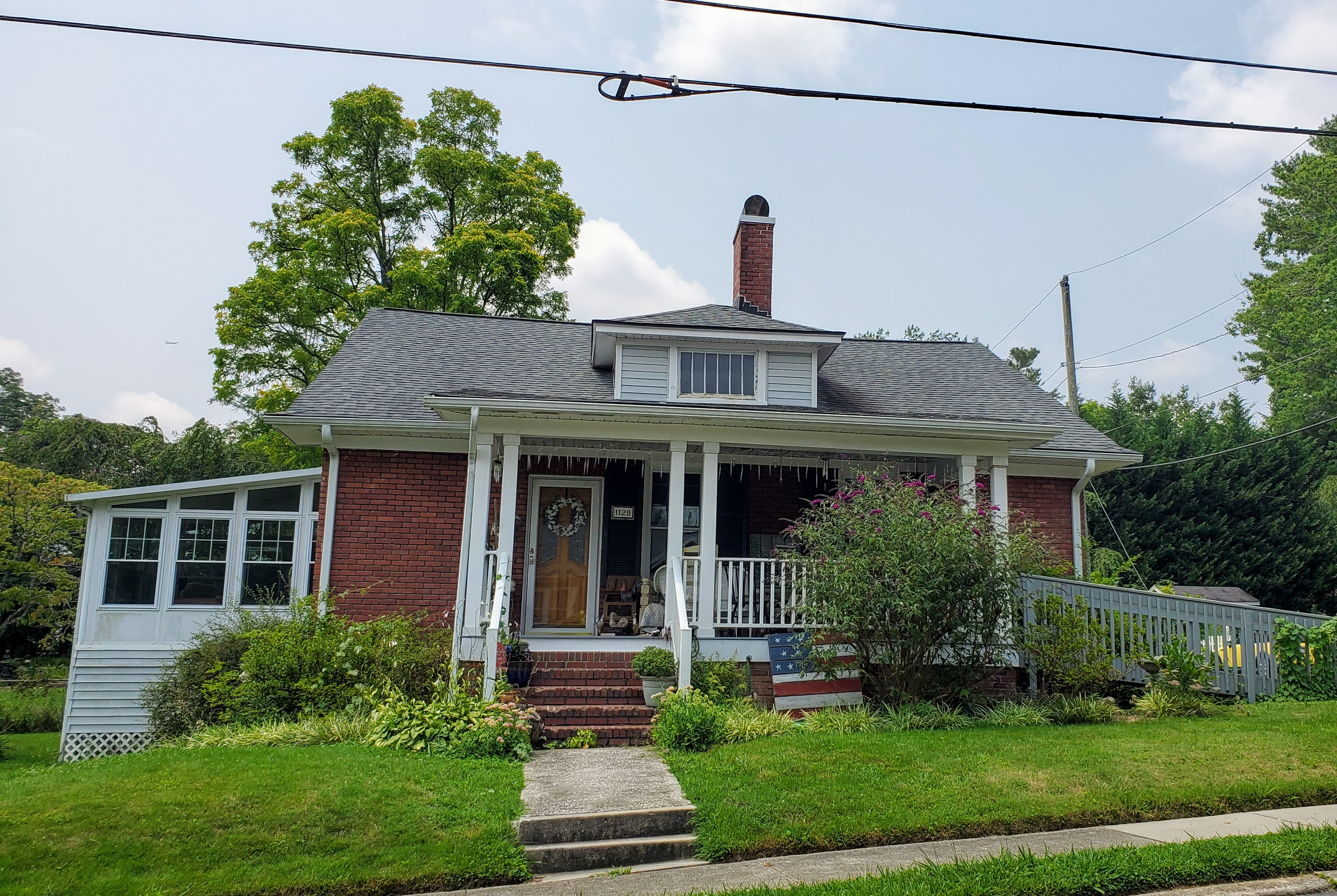
John W. Mcintyre House, 2021

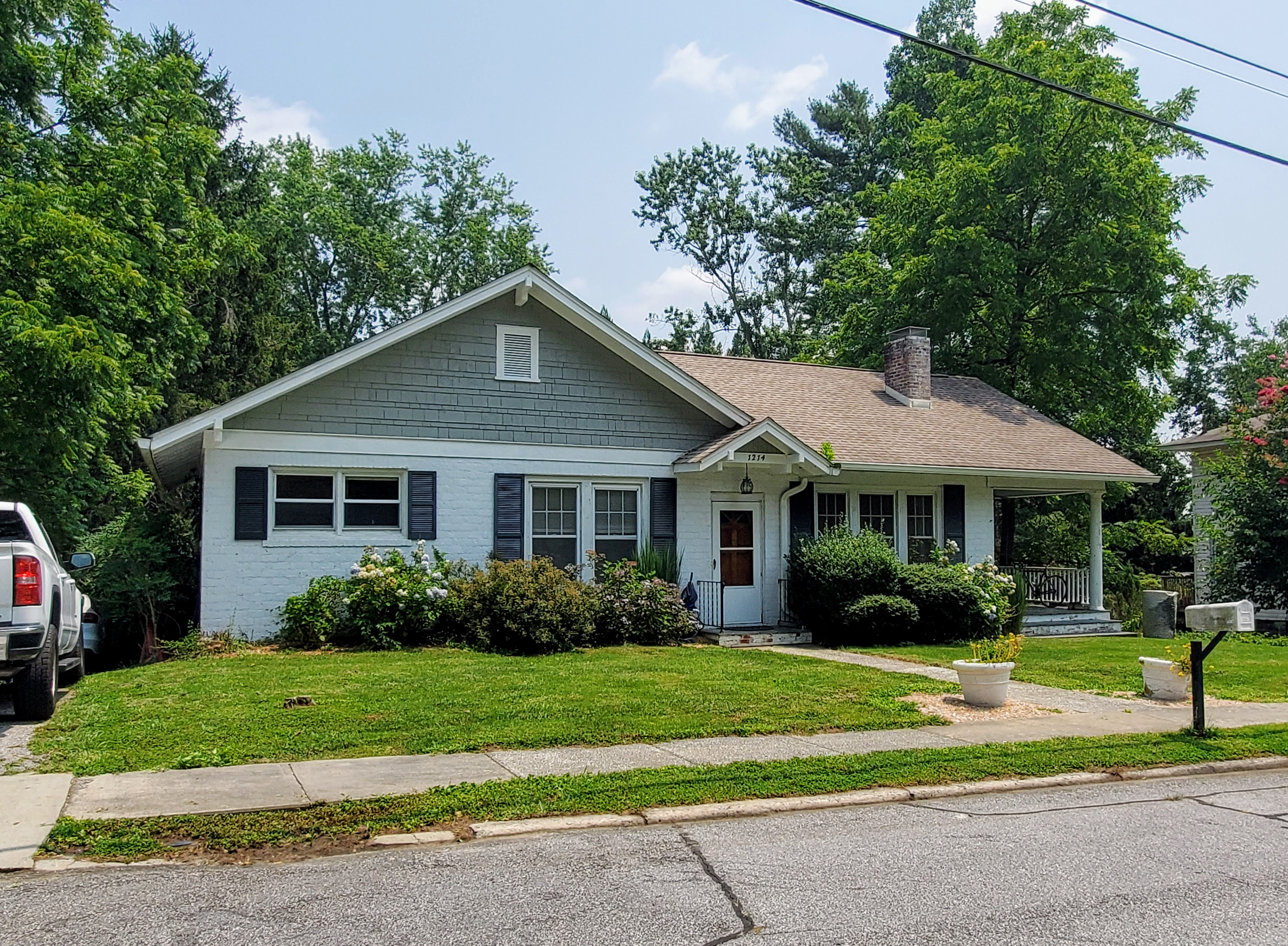
Joseph D. Rahner House, 2021
