= Cold Spring Park Historic District =

Historic district in North Carolina, United States

- U.S. National Register of Historic Places
- U.S. Historic district
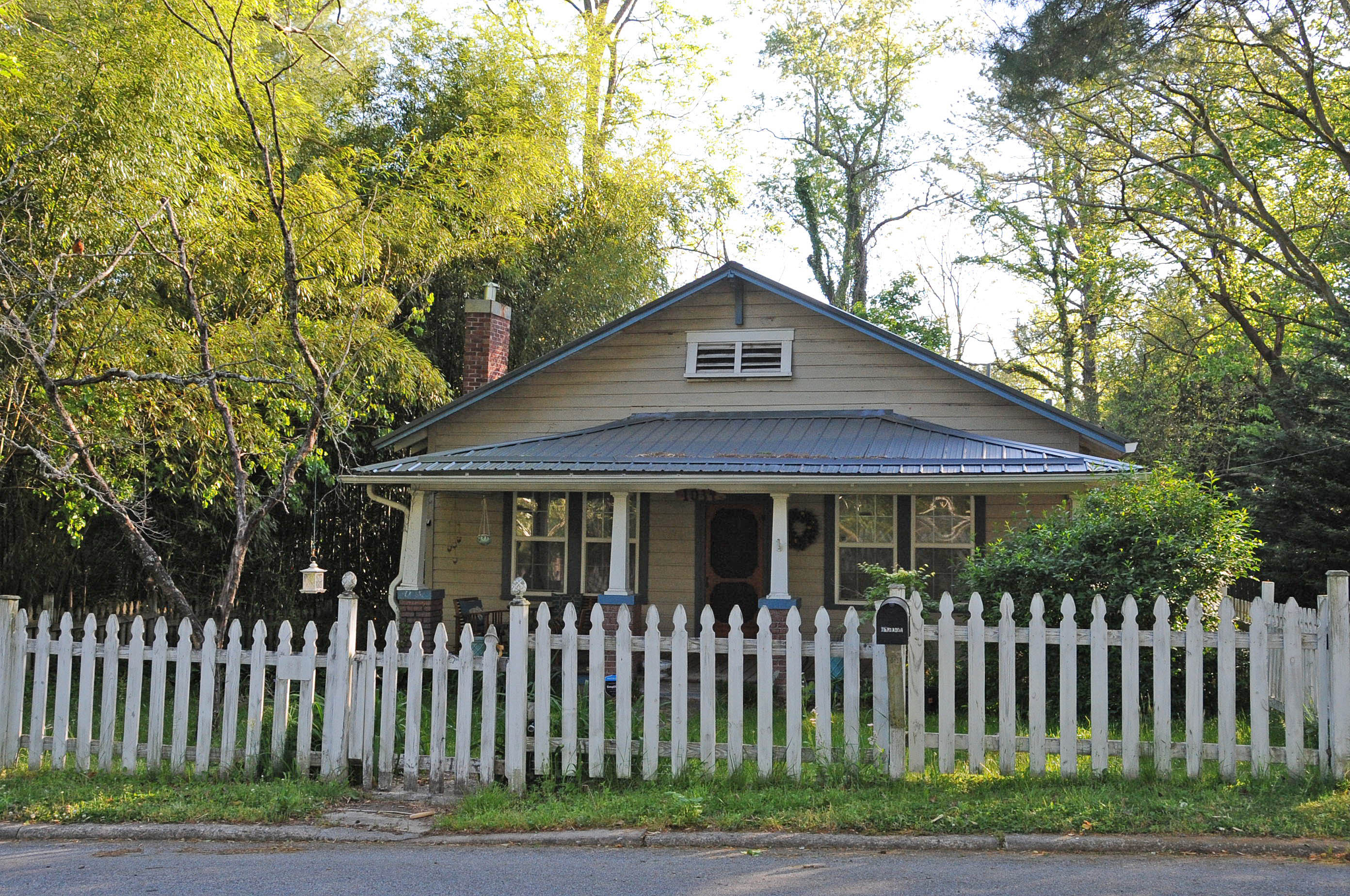

- Location within North Carolina Location within the United States
- Location: Bounded roughly by N. Main St. on the N., Maple St. on the E., 9th Ave. E. on the S., and Locust St. on the W, Hendersonville, North Carolina
- Coordinates: 35°19′29″N 82°27′39″W
- Area: 14 acres (5.7 ha)
- Built: 1910
- Architectural style: Bungalow/craftsman, Colonial Revival, Ranch
- MPS: Hendersonville MPS
- NRHP reference No.: 08001291
- Added to NRHP: January 8, 2009

Cold Spring Park Historic District, also known as Wheeler Park, is a national historic district located at Hendersonville, Henderson County, North Carolina. The district encompasses 37 contributing buildings and 1 contributing structure in a predominantly residential section of Hendersonville developed between 1910 and 1953. It includes notable examples of Colonial Revival and Bungalow / American Craftsman residential architecture.

It was listed on the National Register of Historic Places in 2009.

== Gallery ==
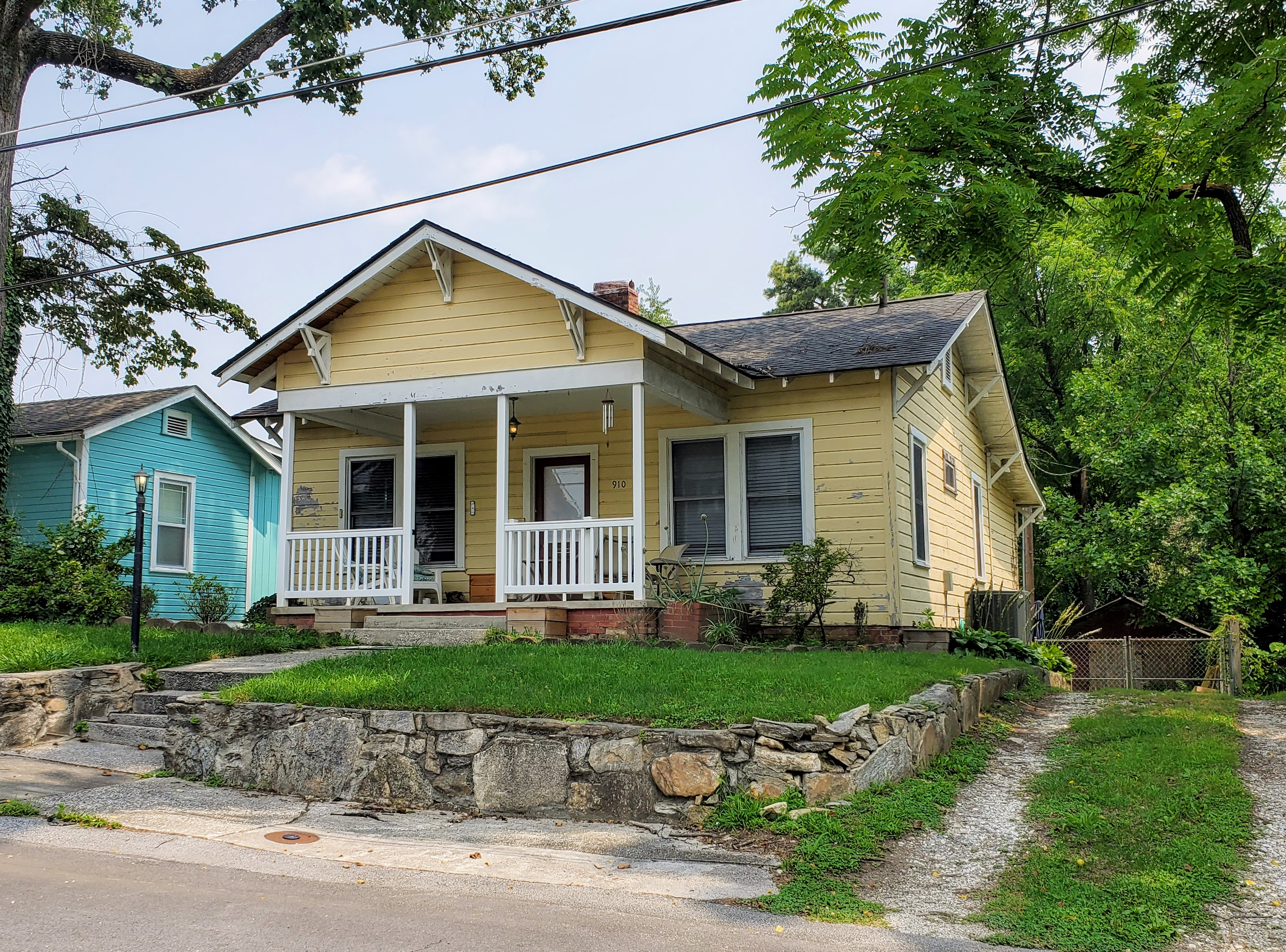
910 Highland Avenue, 2020

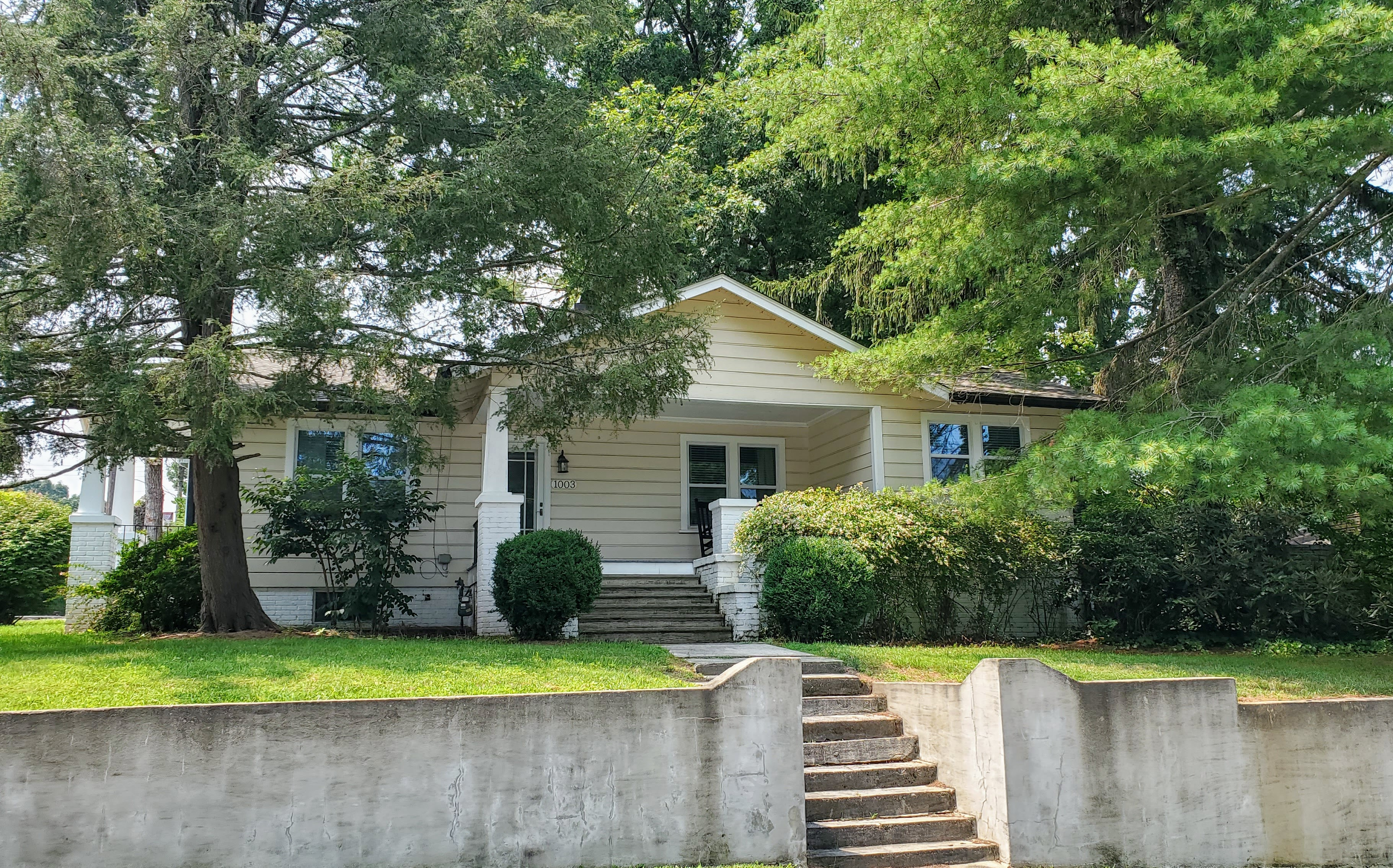
1003 Highland Avenue, 2020

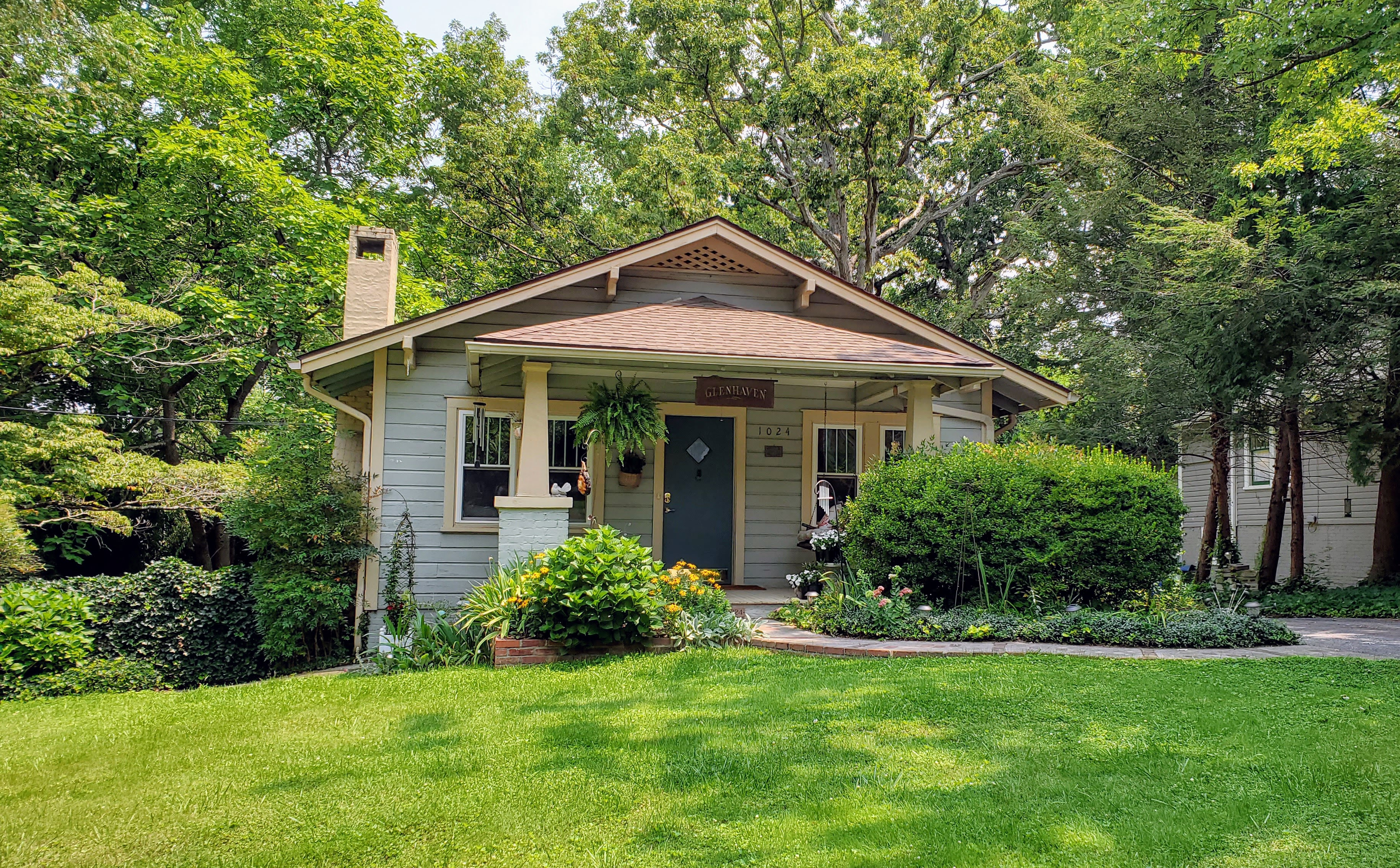
Nicholas W. Lefeber House, 2020

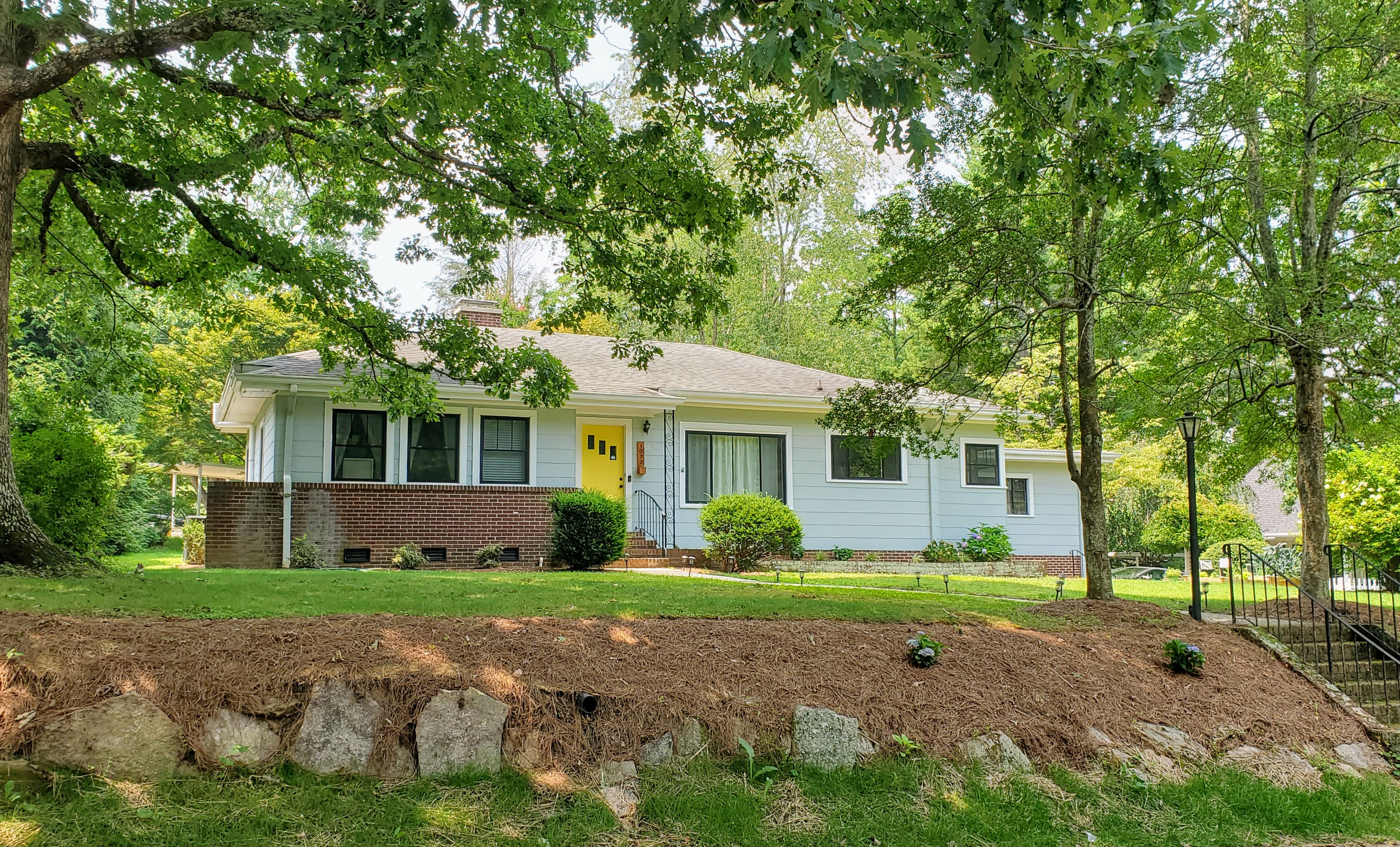
William E. Jamison House, 2020
