= National Register of Historic Places listings in Henderson County, North Carolina =

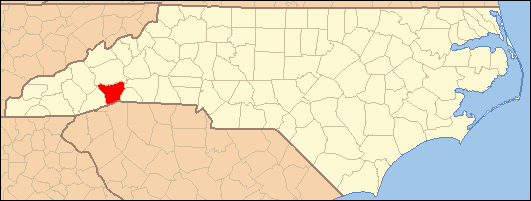

This list includes properties and districts listed on the National Register of Historic Places in Henderson County, North Carolina. Click the "Map of all coordinates" link to the right to view an online map of all properties and districts with latitude and longitude coordinates in the table below.

== Current listings ==
This National Park Service list is complete through NPS recent listings posted April 10, 2026.

	Name on the Register	Image	Date listed	Location	City or town	Description
1	Aloah Hotel	Aloah Hotel	February 24, 1989 (#89000036)	201 3rd Ave., W. 35°18′57″N 82°27′41″W	Hendersonville	
2	Berkeley Mills Ballpark	Berkeley Mills Ballpark	September 19, 2016 (#16000646)	69 Balfour Rd. 35°20′58″N 82°28′13″W	Hendersonville	
3	Blue Ridge Parkway	Blue Ridge Parkway	December 13, 2024 (#100011353)	Blue Ridge Parkway through Virginia and North Carolina; 35°27′14″N 82°41′37″W	Mills River vicinity	
4	Brookland	Brookland	August 19, 1982 (#82003467)	North of Flat Rock on SR 1863; 35°18′10″N 82°26′57″W	Flat Rock	
5	Bryn Avon		April 9, 1999 (#99000437)	Junction of River Rd. and Mallett Rd. 35°17′48″N 82°34′14″W	Etowah	
6	Camp Arrowhead		December 16, 2005 (#05001415)	Cabin Creek Rd., 1 mile (1.6 km) west of junction with Green River Rd. 35°12′47″N 82°28′34″W	Tuxedo	
7	The Cedars	The Cedars	February 24, 1989 (#89000033)	219 7th Ave., W. 35°19′10″N 82°27′47″W	Hendersonville	
8	Chewning House	Chewning House	February 24, 1989 (#89000034)	755 N. Main St. 35°19′14″N 82°27′41″W	Hendersonville	
9	Samuel James and Jessie McCune Childs House		April 2, 2024 (#100010192)	105 Turley Falls Road; 35°19′49″N 82°31′11″W	Hendersonville	
10	Clarke-Hobbs-Davidson House	Clarke-Hobbs-Davidson House	February 24, 1989 (#89000031)	229 5th Ave., W. 35°19′04″N 82°27′44″W	Hendersonville	
11	Cold Spring Park Historic District	Cold Spring Park Historic District	January 8, 2009 (#08001291)	Bounded roughly by N. Main St. on the north, Maple St. on the east, 9th Ave., E., on the south, and Locust St. on the west 35°19′29″N 82°27′39″W	Hendersonville	
12	Mary Mills Coxe House	Mary Mills Coxe House	August 26, 1994 (#94001052)	1210 Greenville Hwy. 35°17′50″N 82°27′05″W	Hendersonville	
13	Druid Hills Historic District	Druid Hills Historic District	August 16, 2000 (#00000989)	Roughly bounded by Meadowbrook Terrace, U.S. Route 25, Ashwood Rd., and Ridgewood Ave. 35°19′49″N 82°28′16″W	Hendersonville	
14	Flat Rock Historic District	Flat Rock Historic District	October 15, 1973 (#73001352)	West of East Flat Rock; also roughly bounded by Rutledge, Dunroy, and N. Highland Lake Drs. and Kanuga, Little River, and W. Blue Ridge Rds. 35°16′18″N 82°27′41″W	Flat Rock	Second set of addresses represents a boundary adjustment February 27, 2015
15	Grey Hosiery Mill	Grey Hosiery Mill	October 6, 2000 (#00001189)	301 Fourth Ave. E 35°19′03″N 82°27′29″W	Hendersonville	
16	Henderson County Courthouse	Henderson County Courthouse	May 10, 1979 (#79001723)	1st and Main Sts. 35°18′52″N 82°27′37″W	Hendersonville	
17	Hyman Heights-Mount Royal Historic District	Hyman Heights-Mount Royal Historic District	February 16, 2001 (#01000124)	Roughly bounded by Ridgecrest Pl., Highland Ave., Hyman Ave., Patton St., N. Main St., and Oakland St. 35°19′38″N 82°27′53″W	Hendersonville	
18	Kanuga Lake Historic District	Kanuga Lake Historic District	August 31, 1995 (#95001056)	Roughly, area surrounding Kanuga Lake; 35°15′43″N 82°31′11″W	Hendersonville	
19	Otto King House	Otto King House	May 1, 2017 (#100000940)	529 Pace Rd. 35°21′09″N 82°23′25″W	Hendersonville	
20	King-Waldrop House	King-Waldrop House	June 28, 1989 (#89000030)	103 S. Washington St. 35°18′53″N 82°27′45″W	Hendersonville	
21	Lenox Park Historic District	Lenox Park Historic District	December 31, 2002 (#02001661)	Roughly bounded by Allen, Spring, and S. Whitted Sts., and Southern RR. 35°18′36″N 82°28′06″W	Hendersonville	
22	Main Street Historic District	Main Street Historic District	March 30, 1989 (#89000028)	Main St. between 6th and 1st Aves., E.; also roughly N. Main St., 2nd Ave., W., W. Allen St., N. Washington, and 1st Ave., E. 35°18′59″N 82°27′37″W	Hendersonville	Second set of boundaries represents a boundary increase of December 20, 2006
23	The Meadows	The Meadows	January 11, 1980 (#80002847)	North of Fletcher on SR 1547; 35°26′11″N 82°29′41″W	Fletcher	Boundary decrease approved January 10, 2019
24	Mills River Chapel	Mills River Chapel	December 2, 1988 (#88002660)	SR 1328, 0.7 miles (1.1 km) north of junction with NC 280; 35°23′04″N 82°34′39″W	Mills River	
25	Arthur W. Moore House	Arthur W. Moore House	January 4, 2001 (#00001613)	299 Sunset Dr. 35°20′29″N 82°31′39″W	Horse Shoe	
26	Moss-Johnson Farm	Moss-Johnson Farm	February 10, 1987 (#87000021)	3346 Haywood Rd. 35°21′34″N 82°30′32″W	Hendersonville	
27	Oakdale Cemetery	Oakdale Cemetery	February 5, 2014 (#13001158)	Northern and southern sides of 6th Ave., W., west of Valley St. 35°19′11″N 82°28′27″W	Hendersonville	
28	Reese House	Reese House	June 2, 1995 (#95000676)	202 S. Washington St. 35°18′46″N 82°27′44″W	Hendersonville	
29	Clough H. Rice House	Clough H. Rice House	December 27, 2011 (#11000974)	219 Stoney Mountain Rd. 35°20′19″N 82°28′35″W	Hendersonville	
30	Rugby Grange	Rugby Grange	May 5, 1987 (#86003748)	Address Restricted; 35°25′15″N 82°31′15″W	Fletcher	
31	Carl Sandburg Home National Historic Site	Carl Sandburg Home National Historic Site	October 17, 1968 (#68000013)	West of Flat Rock; 35°16′04″N 82°27′06″W	Flat Rock	
32	Seventh Avenue Depot District	Seventh Avenue Depot District	March 30, 1989 (#89000029)	Seventh Ave. between Grove and Ash; 35°19′18″N 82°27′27″W	Hendersonville	
33	Dillard B. and Georgia Sewell House	Dillard B. and Georgia Sewell House	April 15, 2015 (#15000164)	64 Clipper Ln. 35°15′36″N 82°36′15″W	Penrose	Extends into Transylvania County
34	Singletary-Reese-Robinson House	Singletary-Reese-Robinson House	September 16, 2010 (#10000754)	211 Robinson Ln. 35°18′38″N 82°29′57″W	Laurel Park	
35	Smith-Williams-Durham Boarding House	Smith-Williams-Durham Boarding House	February 24, 1989 (#89000032)	247 5th Ave., W. 35°19′03″N 82°27′46″W	Hendersonville	
36	Stepp's Mill	Stepp's Mill	August 2, 2024 (#100010671)	1055 Stepp Mill Road; 35°20′29″N 82°20′59″W	Hendersonville vicinity	
37	Erle Stillwell House	Erle Stillwell House	November 20, 2001 (#01000125)	1300 Pinecrest Dr. 35°19′05″N 82°28′43″W	Hendersonville	
38	Erle Stillwell House II	Erle Stillwell House II	September 6, 2002 (#02000933)	541 Blythe St. 35°19′03″N 82°28′41″W	Hendersonville	
39	The Waverly	The Waverly	February 24, 1989 (#89000035)	783 N. Main St. 35°19′15″N 82°27′42″W	Hendersonville	
40	West Side Historic District	West Side Historic District	December 31, 2001 (#01001424)	Roughly bounded by 5th Ave., W., Washington St., 3rd Ave., W., and Blythe St. 35°18′56″N 82°28′12″W	Hendersonville	

== See also ==
- National Register of Historic Places listings in North Carolina
- List of National Historic Landmarks in North Carolina
