= List of Euonymus species =

Euonymus is a genus of plants in the family Celastraceae. As of October 2024, Plants of the World Online accepted 145 species.

== A ==
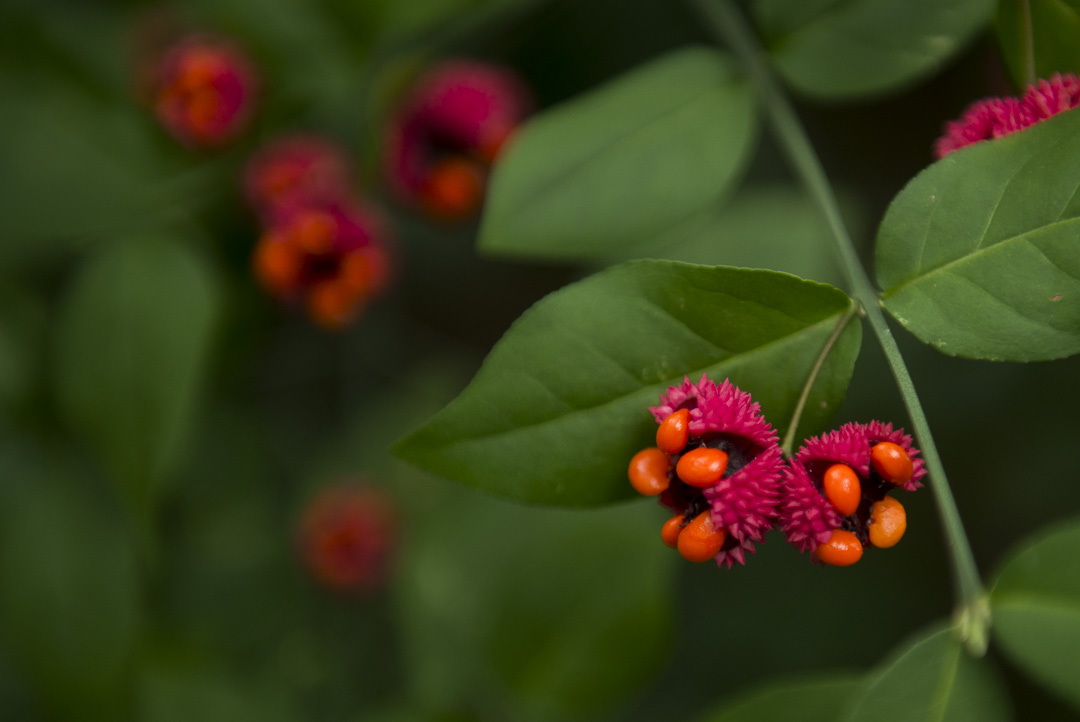
Euonymus americanus

- Euonymus acanthocarpus Franch.
- Euonymus acanthoxanthus Pit.
- Euonymus actinocarpus Loes.
- Euonymus aculeatus Hemsl.
- Euonymus aculeolus C.Y.Cheng ex J.S.Ma
- Euonymus acuminifolius Blakelock
- Euonymus alatus (Thunb.) Siebold
- Euonymus americanus L.
- Euonymus angulatus Wight
- Euonymus aquifolium Loes. & Rehder
- Euonymus atropurpureus Jacq.
- Euonymus attenuatus Wall. ex M.A.Lawson
- Euonymus australianus F.Muell.

== B ==
- Euonymus baekdusanensis M.Kim
- Euonymus balansae Sprague
- Euonymus barberi Murugan & Manickam
- Euonymus benguetensis Merr.
- Euonymus benthamii Lundell
- Euonymus bockii Loes.
- Euonymus boninensis Koidz.
- Euonymus bullatus Wall. ex M.A.Lawson

== C ==
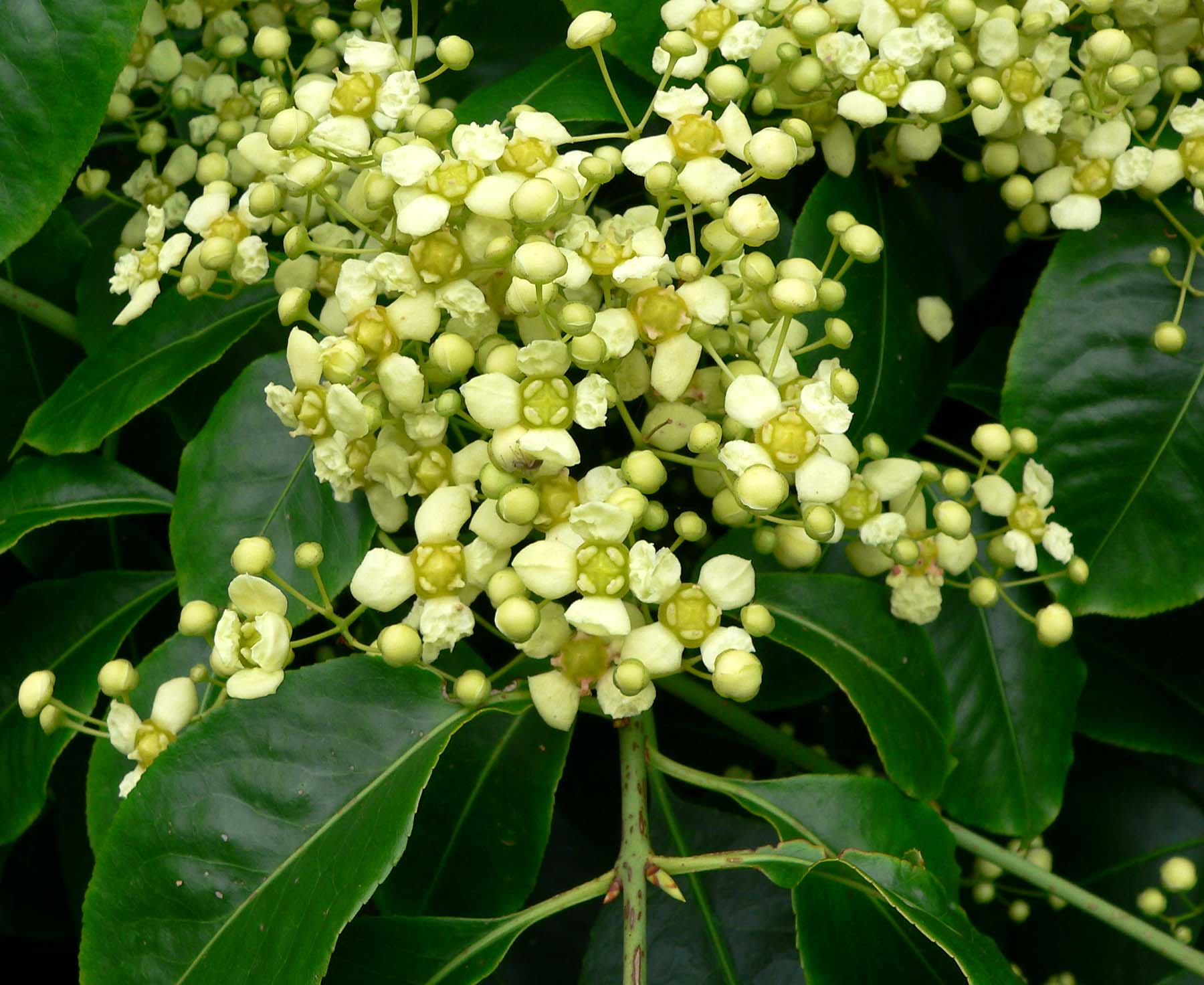
Euonymus carnosus

- Euonymus carnosus Hemsl.
- Euonymus castaneifolius Ridl.
- Euonymus centidens H.Lév.
- Euonymus chengiae J.S.Ma
- Euonymus chenmoui W.C.Cheng
- Euonymus chiapensis Lundell
- Euonymus chibae Makino
- Euonymus chloranthoides Yen C.Yang
- Euonymus chui Hand.-Mazz.
- Euonymus clivicola W.W.Sm.
- Euonymus cochinchinensis Pierre
- Euonymus compressus F.Du & M.M.Li
- Euonymus contractus Sprague
- Euonymus cornutus Hemsl.
- Euonymus corymbosus Sprague & Bullock
- Euonymus costaricensis Standl.
- Euonymus crenulatus Wall. ex Wight & Arn.

== D ==
- Euonymus darrisii H.Lév.
- Euonymus dichotomus B.Heyne ex Wall.
- Euonymus dielsianus Loes.
- Euonymus distichus H.Lév.
- Euonymus dolichopus Merr. ex J.S.Ma

== E ==
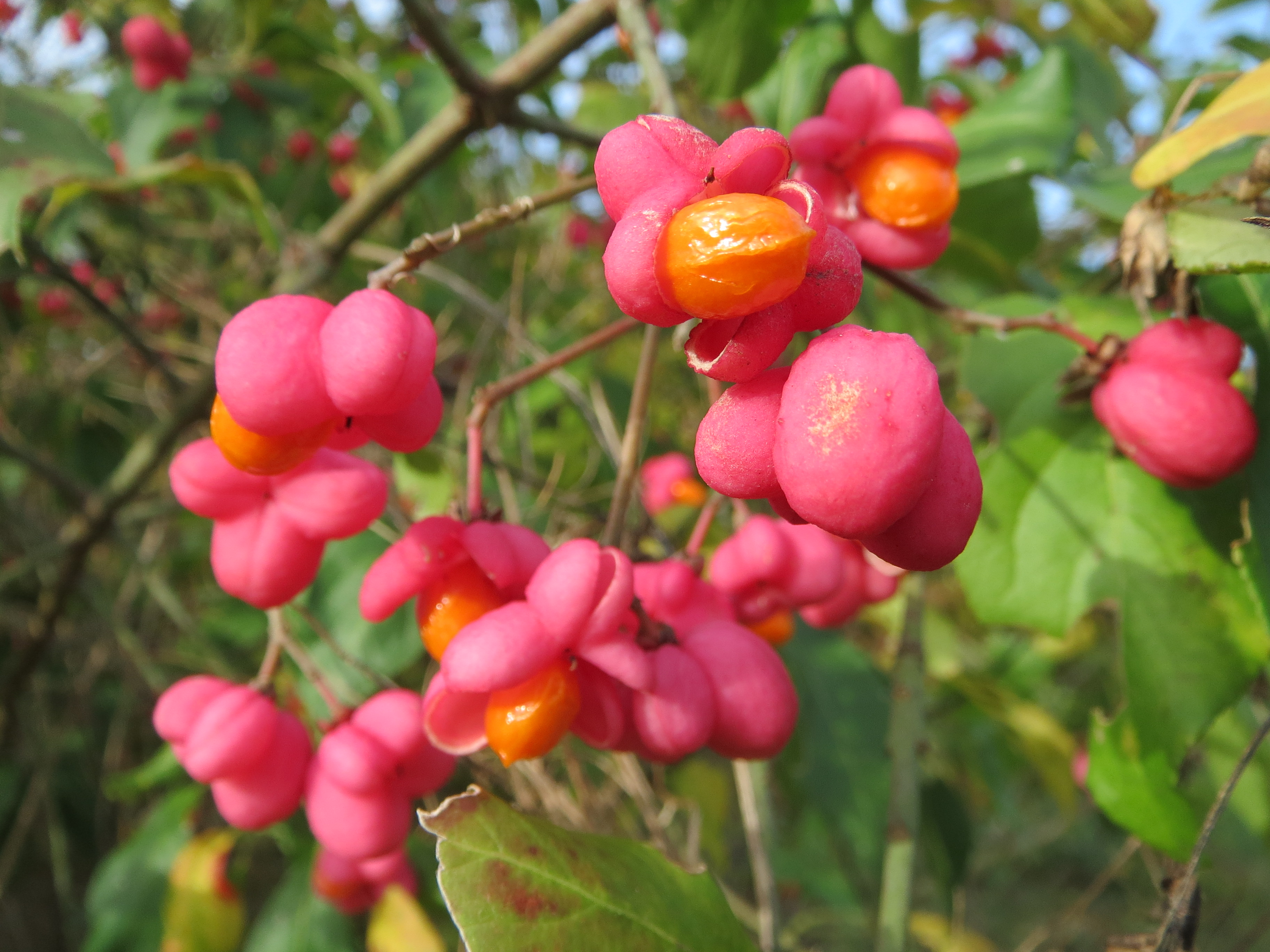
Euonymus europaeus

- Euonymus eberhardtii Tardieu
- Euonymus echinatus Wall.
- Euonymus elaeodendroides Loes.
- Euonymus enantiophyllus (Donn.Sm.) Lundell
- Euonymus europaeus L.
- Euonymus euscaphis Hand.-Mazz.

== F ==
- Euonymus ficoides C.Y.Cheng ex J.S.Ma
- Euonymus fimbriatus Wall.
- Euonymus fortunei (Turcz.) Hand.-Mazz.
- Euonymus frigidus Wall.
- Euonymus fulgens Aver.
- Euonymus fusiformis R.Parker

== G ==
- Euonymus gibber Hance
- Euonymus giraldii Loes.
- Euonymus glaber Roxb.
- Euonymus glandulosus (Merr.) Ding Hou
- Euonymus gracillimus Hemsl.
- Euonymus grandiflorus Wall.

== H ==
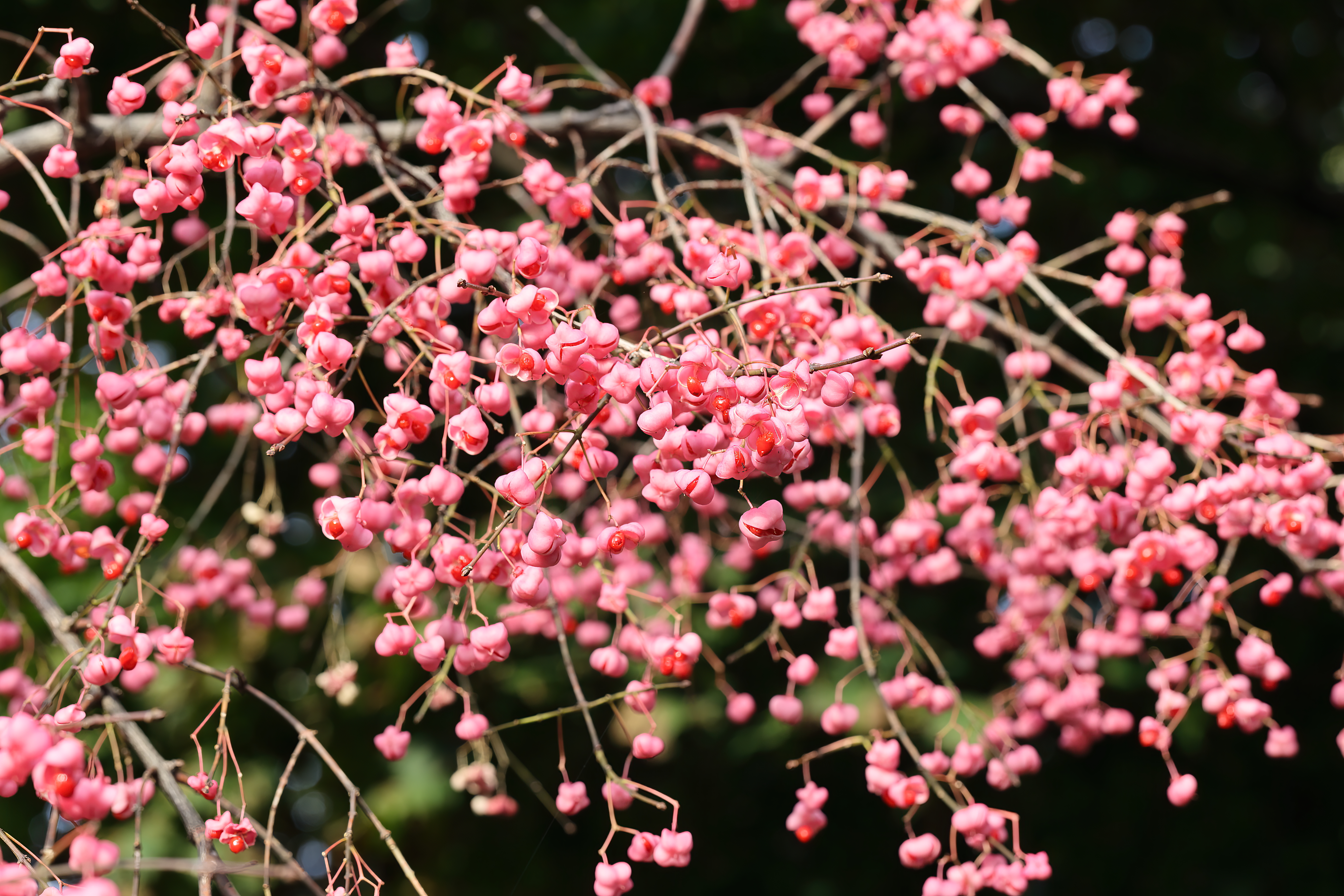
Euonymus hamiltonianus

- Euonymus hainanensis W.Y.Chun & F.C.How
- Euonymus hamiltonianus Wall.
- Euonymus hemsleyanus Loes.
- Euonymus huae J.S.Ma
- Euonymus hukuangensis C.Y.Cheng ex J.S.Ma
- Euonymus hupehensis (Loes.) Loes.

== I ==
- Euonymus impressus Blakelock
- Euonymus indicus B.Heyne ex Wall.

== J ==
- Euonymus japonicus Thunb.
- Euonymus jinyangensis C.Y.Chang

== K ==
- Euonymus kachinensis Prain
- Euonymus kanyakumariensis Murugan & Manickam
- Euonymus kengmaensis C.Y.Cheng ex J.S.Ma
- Euonymus kweichowensis Chen H.Wang

== L ==
- Euonymus lanceolatus Yatabe
- Euonymus latifolius (L.) Mill.
- Euonymus lawsonii C.B.Clarke ex Prain
- Euonymus laxiflorus Champ. ex Benth.
- Euonymus leiophloeus Steven
- Euonymus lichiangensis W.W.Sm.
- Euonymus lucidus D.Don
- Euonymus lushanensis F.H.Chen & M.C.Wang
- Euonymus lutchuensis T.Itô

== M ==
- Euonymus maackii Rupr.
- Euonymus macrocarpus Gamble ex Oliv.
- Euonymus macropterus Rupr.
- Euonymus melananthus Franch. & Sav.
- Euonymus mengtseanus (Loes.) Sprague
- Euonymus mexicanus Benth.
- Euonymus microcarpus (Oliv. ex Loes.) Sprague
- Euonymus moluccensis Blakelock ex Ding Hou
- Euonymus myrianthus Hemsl.

== N ==
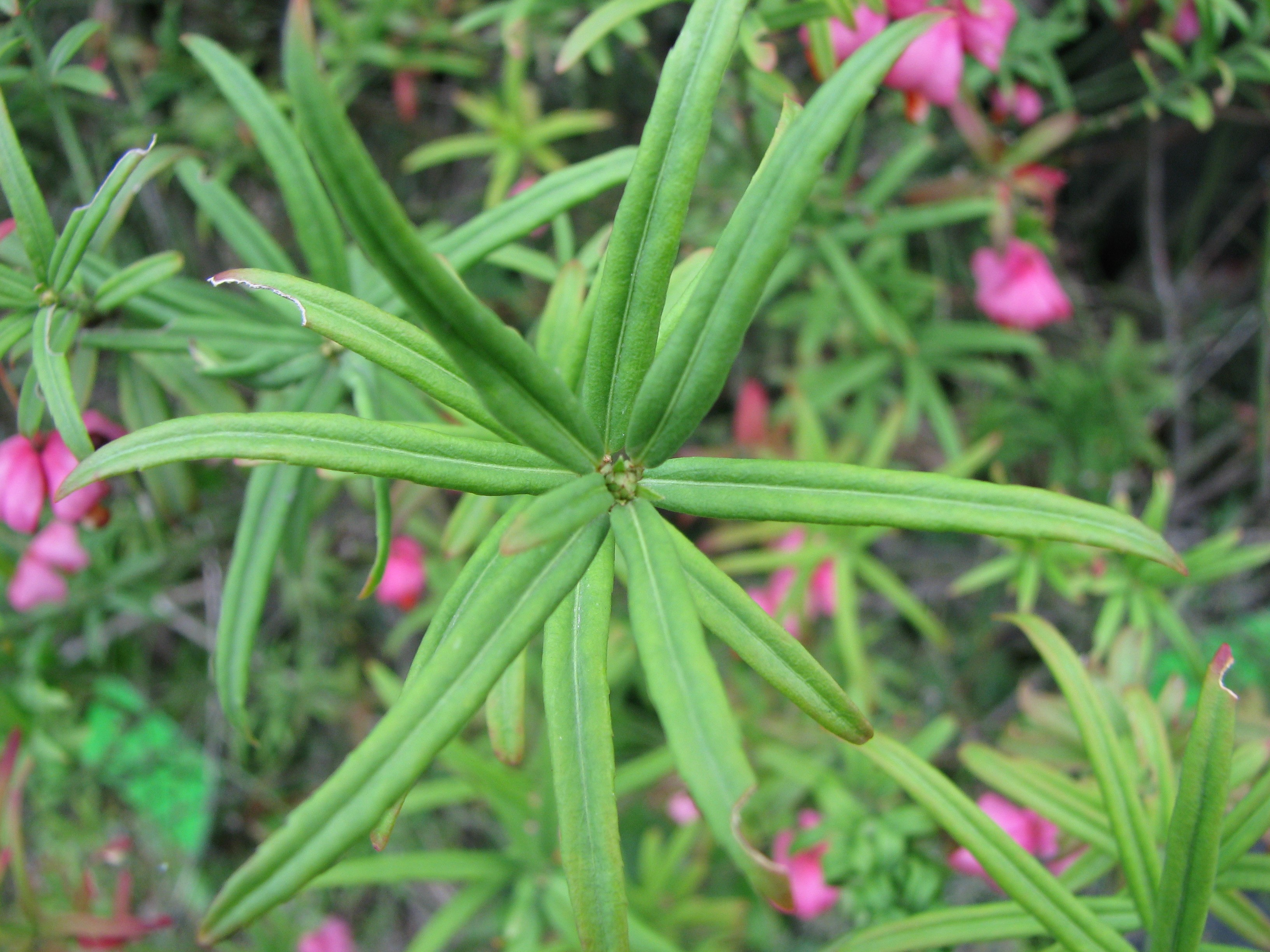
Euonymus nanus

- Euonymus nanoides Loes. & Rehder
- Euonymus nanus M.Bieb.
- Euonymus nitidus Benth.

== O ==
- Euonymus obovatus Nutt.
- Euonymus occidentalis Nutt. ex Torr.
- Euonymus oxyphyllus Miq.

== P ==
- Euonymus parasimilis C.Y.Cheng ex J.S.Ma
- Euonymus percoriaceus C.Y.Wu ex J.S.Ma
- Euonymus phellomanus Loes.
- Euonymus pittosporoides C.Y.Cheng ex J.S.Ma
- Euonymus pleurostylioides (Loes.) H.Perrier
- Euonymus potingensis Chun & F.C.How ex J.S.Ma
- Euonymus pseudovagans Pit.

== R ==
- Euonymus recurvans Miq.
- Euonymus rehderianus Loes.
- Euonymus revolutus Wight
- Euonymus rothschuhii Loes.

== S ==
- Euonymus sachalinensis (F.Schmidt) Maxim.
- Euonymus salicifolius Loes.
- Euonymus sanguineus Loes.
- Euonymus schensianus Maxim.
- Euonymus semenovii Regel & Herder
- Euonymus serratifolius Bedd.
- Euonymus sootepensis Craib
- Euonymus spraguei Hayata
- Euonymus subcordatus J.S.Ma
- Euonymus subsulcatus Prain
- Euonymus szechuanensis C.H.Wang

== T ==
- Euonymus tashiroi Maxim.
- Euonymus tenuiserratus C.Y.Cheng ex J.S.Ma
- Euonymus ternifolius Hand.-Mazz.
- Euonymus theacola C.Y.Cheng ex T.L.Xu & Q.H.Chen.
- Euonymus theifolius Wall. ex M.A.Lawson
- Euonymus tibeticus W.W.Sm.
- Euonymus tingens Wall.
- Euonymus tonkinensis (Loes.) Loes.
- Euonymus tsoi Merr.

== V ==
- Euonymus vaganoides C.Y.Cheng ex J.S.Ma
- Euonymus vagans Wall.
- Euonymus velutinus Fisch. & C.A.Mey.
- Euonymus venosus Hemsl.
- Euonymus verrucocarpus C.Y.Cheng ex J.S.Ma
- Euonymus verrucosoides Loes.
- Euonymus verrucosus Scop.
- Euonymus viburnoides Prain

== W ==
- Euonymus walkeri Wight
- Euonymus wilsonii Sprague
- Euonymus wrayi King
- Euonymus wui J.S.Ma
- Euonymus wulinensis S.S.Ying

== Y ==
- Euonymus yakushimensis Makino
- Euonymus yunnanensis Franch.
