= Valley Hill =

Valley Hill may refer to:

- Valley Hill, Mississippi in Carroll County
- Valley Hill, North Carolina in Henderson County
