= Mills River (North Carolina) =

River in North Carolina

Mills River Tributary to French Broad River
- Location of Mills River mouth Mills River (North Carolina) (the United States)

Location
- Country: United States
- State: North Carolina; Virginia
- County: Henderson

Physical characteristics
- Source: confluence of North Fork and South Fork of Mills River
  - location: about 3 miles west of Mills River, North Carolina
  - coordinates: 35°23′33″N 082°36′37″W
  - elevation: 2,110 ft (640 m)
- Mouth: French Broad River
  - location: about 1.5 miles east of Mills River, North Carolina
  - coordinates: 35°23′19″N 082°31′55″W
  - elevation: 2,044 ft (623 m)
- Length: 6.10 mi (9.82 km)
- Basin size: 73.41 square miles (190.1 km^{2})
- Discharge
  - location: French Broad River
  - average: 189.76 cu ft/s (5.373 m^{3}/s) at mouth with Mills River

Basin features
- Progression: generally east
- River system: French Broad River
- Tributaries
  - left: Foster Creek
  - right: Brandy Branch
- Bridges: Boylston Highway (NC 280), Hooper Lane

The Mills River is located in Transylvania and Henderson counties, North Carolina, United States is a tributary of the French Broad River. The river flows out of the Pisgah Ranger District of the Pisgah National Forest in two forks: the North Fork, which drains the slopes just south of the Blue Ridge Parkway between Asheville and Mount Pisgah, and the South Fork, which drains the area of the Pisgah Ranger District just east of the Cradle of Forestry in America, including the slopes of Black Mountain. The Mills River flows into the French Broad River northwest of Hendersonville between NC 191 and Interstate 26.

The North Mills River Recreation Area, located on the North Fork of the river, is a popular local attraction for camping, hiking, and fishing. The Mills River is used as a water source for the cities of Asheville and Hendersonville.
