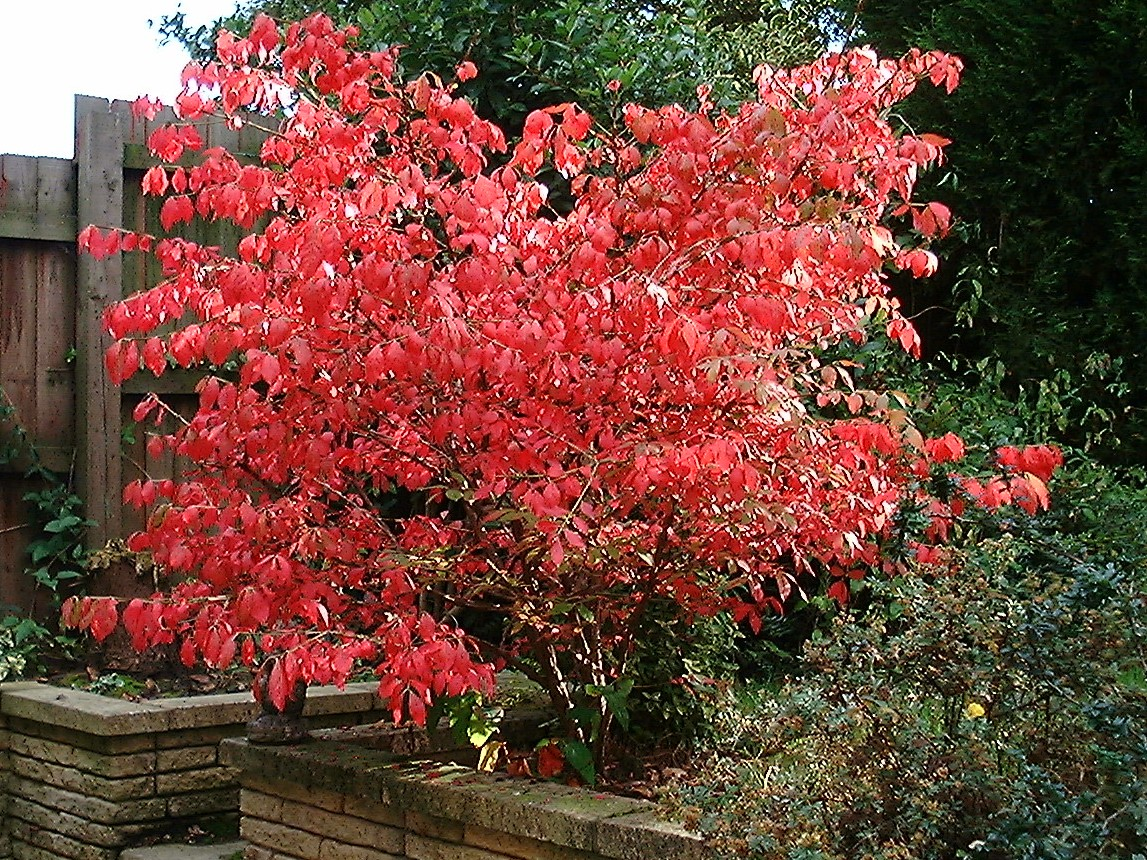

Scientific classification
- Kingdom: Plantae
- Clade: Tracheophytes
- Clade: Angiosperms
- Clade: Eudicots
- Clade: Rosids
- Order: Celastrales
- Family: Celastraceae
- Genus: Euonymus
- Species: E. alatus

Binomial name
- Euonymus alatus (Thunb.) Siebold

= Euonymus alatus =

Species of plant

Euonymus alatus, known variously as burning bush, winged euonymus, winged spindle, and winged spindle-tree, is a species of flowering plant in the family Celastraceae, native to central and northern China, Japan, and Korea.

It is a popular ornamental plant in gardens and parks due to its bright pink or orange fruit and attractive autumn color: The common name "burning bush" refers to its bright red autumn color. The cultivars 'Compactus' and 'Fire Ball' have gained the Royal Horticultural Society's Award of Garden Merit.

== Description ==
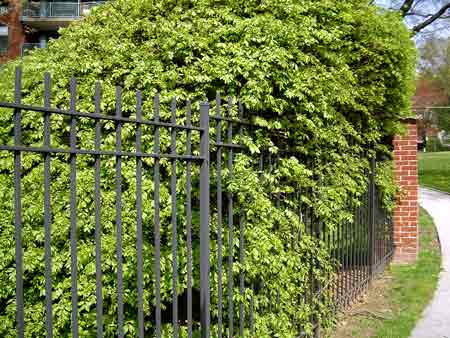

This deciduous shrub grows to 6.1 m (20 ft) tall, often wider than tall. As with the related Euonymus phellomanus, the stems are notable for their four corky ridges or "wings". The word alatus (or alata, used formerly) is Latin for "winged," in reference to the winged branches. These structures develop from a cork cambium deposited in longitudinal grooves in the twigs' first year, unlike similar wings in other plants such as Quercus macrocarpa. The leaves are 2–7 cm (3/4–2 3/4 in) long and 1–4 cm (1/2–1 1/2 in) broad, ovate-elliptic, with an acute apex. The flowers are greenish, borne over a long period in the spring. The fruit is a red aril enclosed by a four-lobed pink, yellow, or orange capsule.

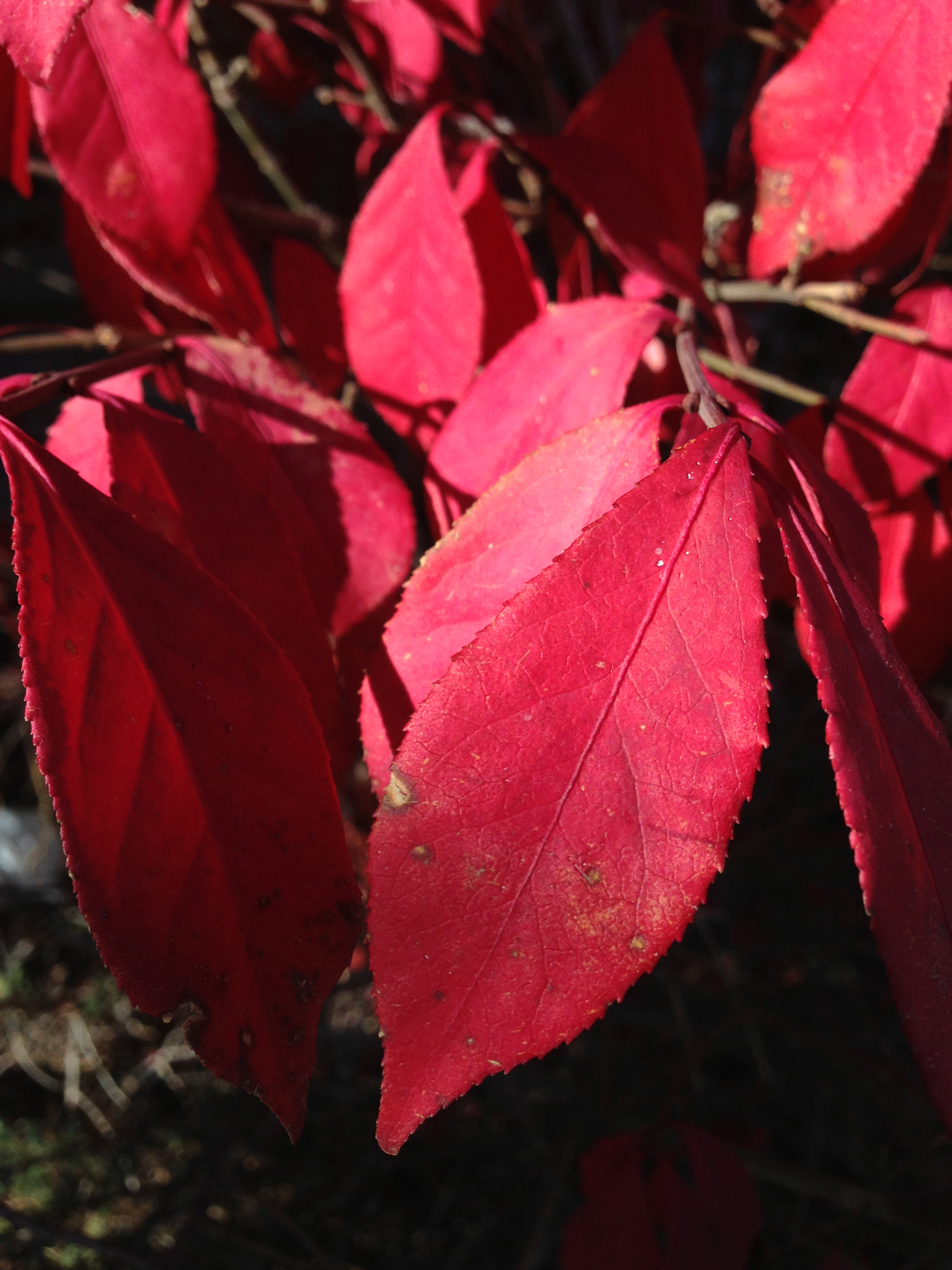
Detail of leaves in autumn

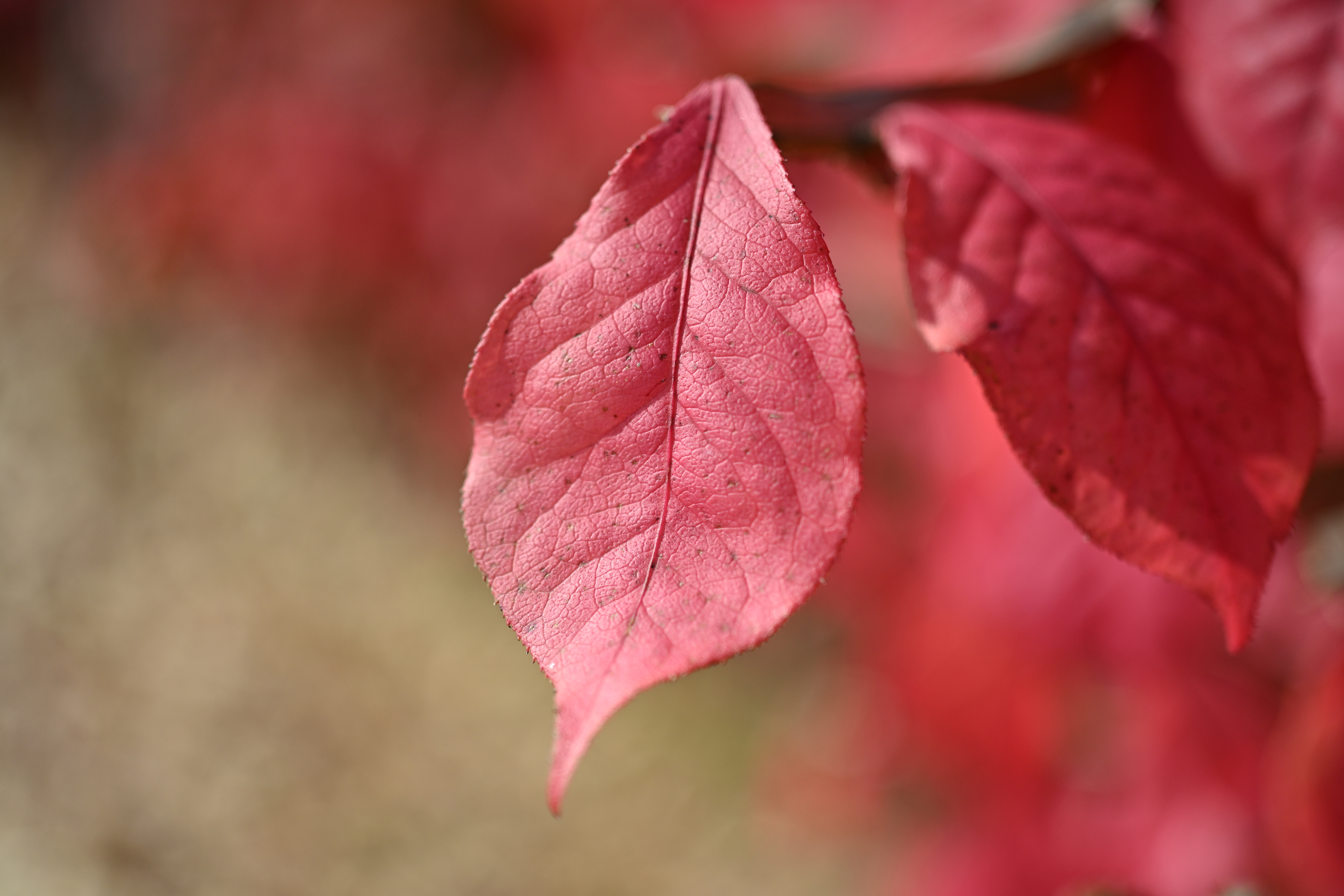
Detail of a leaf in autumn

All parts of the plant are toxic by ingestion, causing severe discomfort.

== Distribution and habitat ==
Euonymus alatus′s native distribution extends from northeastern Asia to central China. Besides central and eastern China, Euonymus alatus also appears in Korea, in Japan, and on the island of Sakhalin in Russia. In its native areas, it occurs in forests, woodlands, and scrublands from sea level to an elevation of 8,900 ft (2,700 m).

Euonymus alatus is not native to North America. It was first introduced in the United States in the 1860s and is found in New England and from Illinois south to northern Florida and the United States Gulf Coast. It also is found in southeastern Canada.

== Uses ==
Generally cultivated for its ornamental qualities, attraction to wildlife, and ability to adapt to urban and suburban environments, the shrub commonly is used in foundation planting, hedges, and along highways and commercial strips. Sales across the United States are in the tens of millions of dollars every year.

The corky winged stems are used in traditional Chinese and traditional Korean medicine to treat conditions such as cancer, hyperglycemia, and diabetic complications. Chemicals that have been isolated from the plant include flavonoids, terpenoids, steroids, lignans, cardenolides, phenolic acids, and alkaloids.

== Invasive species ==
Euonymus alatus is regarded as an invasive species of woodlands in the northeastern United States and southeastern Canada, where it can outcompete native vegetation and disrupt local ecosystems. It is currently, since the 1970s, considered an invasive species in 21 U.S. states, and its importation and sale are prohibited in the U.S. states of Maine, Massachusetts, New Hampshire, Pennsylvania, and Vermont.

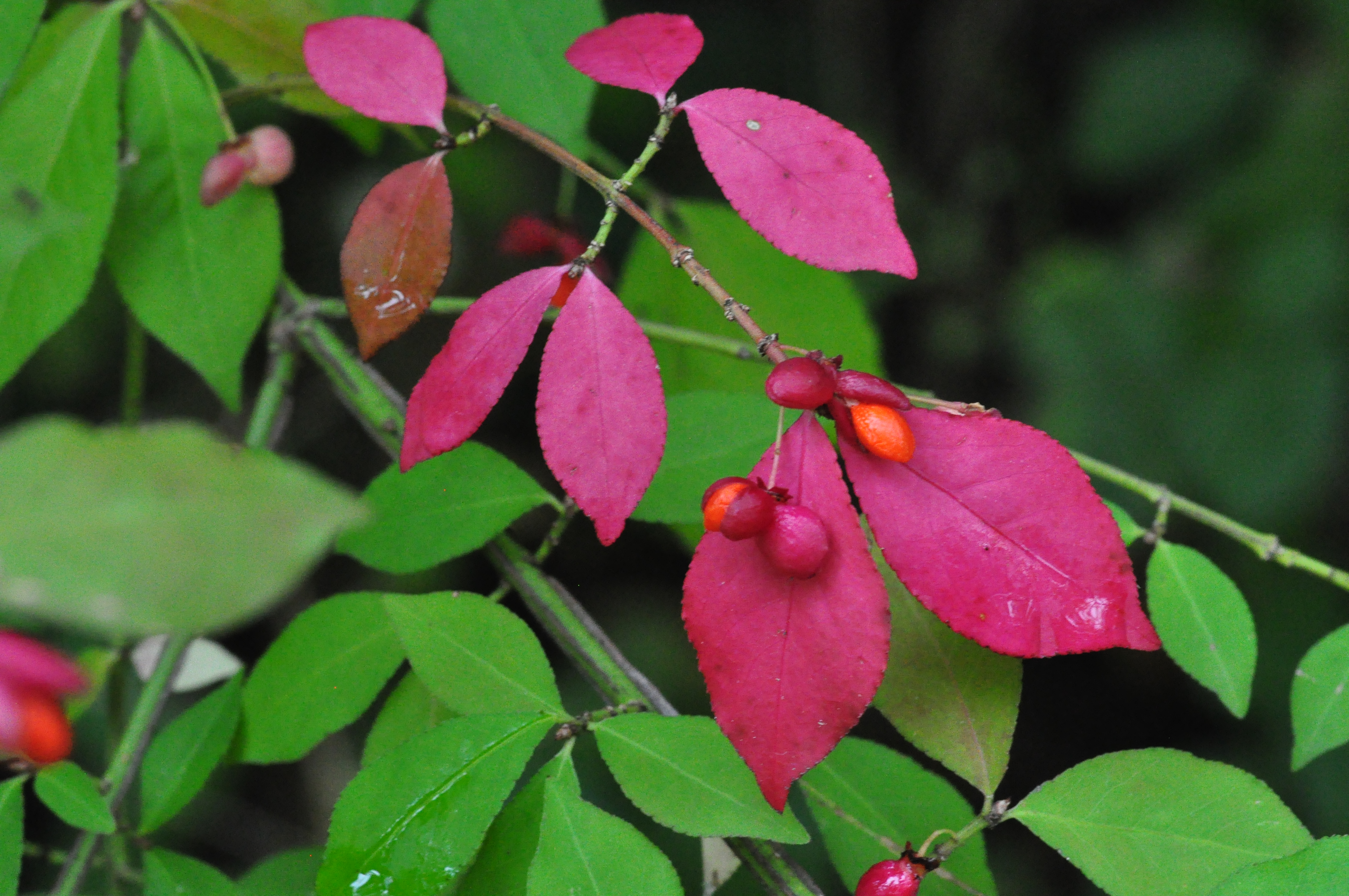

Dr. Thomas Ranney of North Carolina State University at the Mountain Horticultural Crops Research Station in Mills River, North Carolina, developed a new seedless cultivar named Fire Ball Seedless (Euonymus alatus NCEA1) which became available to wholesale growers in the spring of 2024 as the first seedless cultivar of the shrub on the market. Seedless cultivars could allow the phasing out of sales of seeded versions of the shrub and reduce its tendency to spread invasively.
