= Laurel Park, North Carolina =

- Town
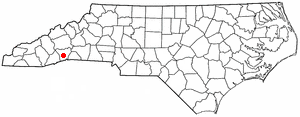
- Location of Laurel Park, North Carolina
- Coordinates: 35°18′42″N 82°30′14″W
- Country: United States
- State: North Carolina
- County: Henderson
- Incorporated: 1925

Government
  - Type: Council-Manager
  - Mayor: J. Carey O’Cain

Area
  - Total: 2.82 sq mi (7.31 km^{2})
  - Land: 2.80 sq mi (7.25 km^{2})
  - Water: 0.023 sq mi (0.06 km^{2})
- Elevation: 2,763 ft (842 m)

Population (2020)
  - Total: 2,250
  - Density: 803.3/sq mi (310.15/km^{2})
- Time zone: UTC-5 (Eastern (EST))
  - Summer (DST): UTC-4 (EDT)
- ZIP code: 28739
- Area code: 828
- FIPS code: 37-37160
- GNIS feature ID: 2405992
- Website: www.laurelpark.org

Laurel Park is a town in Henderson County, North Carolina, United States. The population was 2,250 at the 2020 census. It is part of the Asheville Metropolitan Statistical Area.

== History ==
The town of Laurel Park was settled on what had been Cherokee land in the late 1800s. Summer cottages and camps were construction in the areas surrounding Echo Mountain. By 1903, a rail line had been built up Fifth Avenue in Hendersonville to bring day-trippers and summer visitors to Rainbow Lake to enjoy swimming, boating, dancing, camping, and gambling at the Laurel Park Casino. Visitors to the casino included famous boxer Jack Dempsey. Later, another rail line and a canal connected Rainbow Lake with Laurel Lake (Rhododendron Lake), and a counter-balanced railway took sightseers from Crystal Spring (near Rainbow Lake) to an observation tower for views of downtown Hendersonville and near and distant mountains. In 1925, the town was formally incorporated. That same year, Commodore J. Perry Stolz, builder of the popular and expensive Miami Fleetwood Hotel in Florida, arrived in Hendersonville with plans to repeat his success at the top of Jump Off Mountain near Jump-Off Rock. This 15-story hotel, also to be called the Fleetwood, would have a brick exterior trimmed with marble, all the modern conveniences, and a radio station at the top. A new concrete road (named Laurel Park Highway) was built up the mountain to the hotel site; this was used for transporting construction materials. Less than a year later, financial problems led to a halt in construction. Despite numerous attempts to complete the hotel, the 13th floor was the last floor completed, and the hotel was razed in 1939 by a salvage company.

After the stock market crash, the town slowly transitioned from a summer recreational resort to a more residential community.

The Singletary-Reese-Robinson House was listed on the National Register of Historic Places in 2010.

== Government ==
The town of Laurel Park is organized under the Council-Manager form of government, consisting of a mayor elected to a four-year term, as well as four commissioners elected to staggered four-year terms. The Mayor is J. Carey O’Cain, first elected in 2011 after serving on the city commission.

In recent years, the town has been one of the areas of Henderson County trending the most to the Democratic Party. In 2016, the town gave 50% of its votes to Donald Trump, while in the 2020 Presidential Election it gave 55% of its votes to Joe Biden, a swing of 15%, one of the largest swings to the Democrats in Henderson County.

== Geography ==
Laurel Park is located in central Henderson County on the eastern slopes of Jump off Mountain. It is bordered to the east by the city of Hendersonville, the county seat. To the south is the unincorporated community of Valley Hill, and to the west is the community of Horse Shoe.

U.S. Route 64 passes through the northern part of the town, in the valley of Shaw Creek. Route 64 leads east into Hendersonville and west 7 miles (11 km) to Etowah.

The town government maintains three parks: Jump Off Rock Park, Rhododendron Lake Nature Park, and Little Laurel Green Park. Additionally, several hiking trails run around the town.

According to the United States Census Bureau, the town has a total area of 2.8 square miles (7.3 km^{2}), of which 0.023 square miles (0.06 km^{2}), or 0.78%, are water.

== Demographics ==
Historical population
Census	Pop.	Note	%±
1930	127		—
1940	171		34.6%
1950	302		76.6%
1960	421		39.4%
1970	581		38.0%
1980	764		31.5%
1990	1,322		73.0%
2000	1,835		38.8%
2010	2,180		18.8%
2020	2,250		3.2%
U.S. Decennial Census

=== 2020 census ===
As of the 2020 census, Laurel Park had a population of 2,250. The median age was 63.9 years. 11.6% of residents were under the age of 18 and 47.5% of residents were 65 years of age or older. For every 100 females, there were 84.0 males, and for every 100 females age 18 and over, there were 80.2 males.

98.5% of residents lived in urban areas, while 1.5% lived in rural areas.

There were 1,087 households in Laurel Park, of which 14.4% had children under the age of 18 living in them. Of all households, 54.7% were married-couple households, 12.4% were households with a male householder and no spouse or partner present, and 28.2% were households with a female householder and no spouse or partner present. About 32.7% of all households were made up of individuals, and 20.8% had someone living alone who was 65 years of age or older.

There were 1,310 housing units, of which 17.0% were vacant. The homeowner vacancy rate was 1.6% and the rental vacancy rate was 12.3%.

Laurel Park racial composition
Race	Number	Percentage
White (non-Hispanic)	2,112	93.87%
Black or African American (non-Hispanic)	15	0.67%
Native American	1	0.04%
Asian	13	0.58%
Pacific Islander	3	0.13%
Other/Mixed	54	2.4%
Hispanic or Latino	52	2.31%

=== 2000 census ===
As of the census of 2000, there were 1,835 people, 930 households, and 606 families residing in the town. The population density was 683.8 inhabitants per square mile (264.0/km^{2}). There were 1,115 housing units at an average density of 415.5 per square mile (160.4/km^{2}). The racial makeup of the town was 98.47% White, 0.49% African American, 0.05% Native American, 0.27% Asian, 0.05% from other races, and 0.65% from two or more races. Hispanic or Latino of any race were 0.54% of the population.

There were 930 households, out of which 13.5% had children under the age of 18 living with them, 60.2% were married couples living together, 4.4% had a female householder with no husband present, and 34.8% were non-families. 31.5% of all households were made up of individuals, and 18.5% had someone living alone who was 65 years of age or older. The average household size was 1.97 and the average family size was 2.42.

In the town, the population was spread out, with 12.7% under the age of 18, 2.6% from 18 to 24, 16.5% from 25 to 44, 28.2% from 45 to 64, and 40.1% who were 65 years of age or older. The median age was 59 years. For every 100 females, there were 81.1 males. For every 100 females age 18 and over, there were 78.8 males.

The median income for a household in the town was $52,813, and the median income for a family was $59,118. Males had a median income of $49,853 versus $29,750 for females. The per capita income for the town was $35,749. About 2.2% of families and 3.3% of the population were below the poverty line, including 5.8% of those under age 18 and 2.8% of those age 65 or over.
