= Singletary-Reese-Robinson House =

Historic house in North Carolina, United States

- U.S. National Register of Historic Places
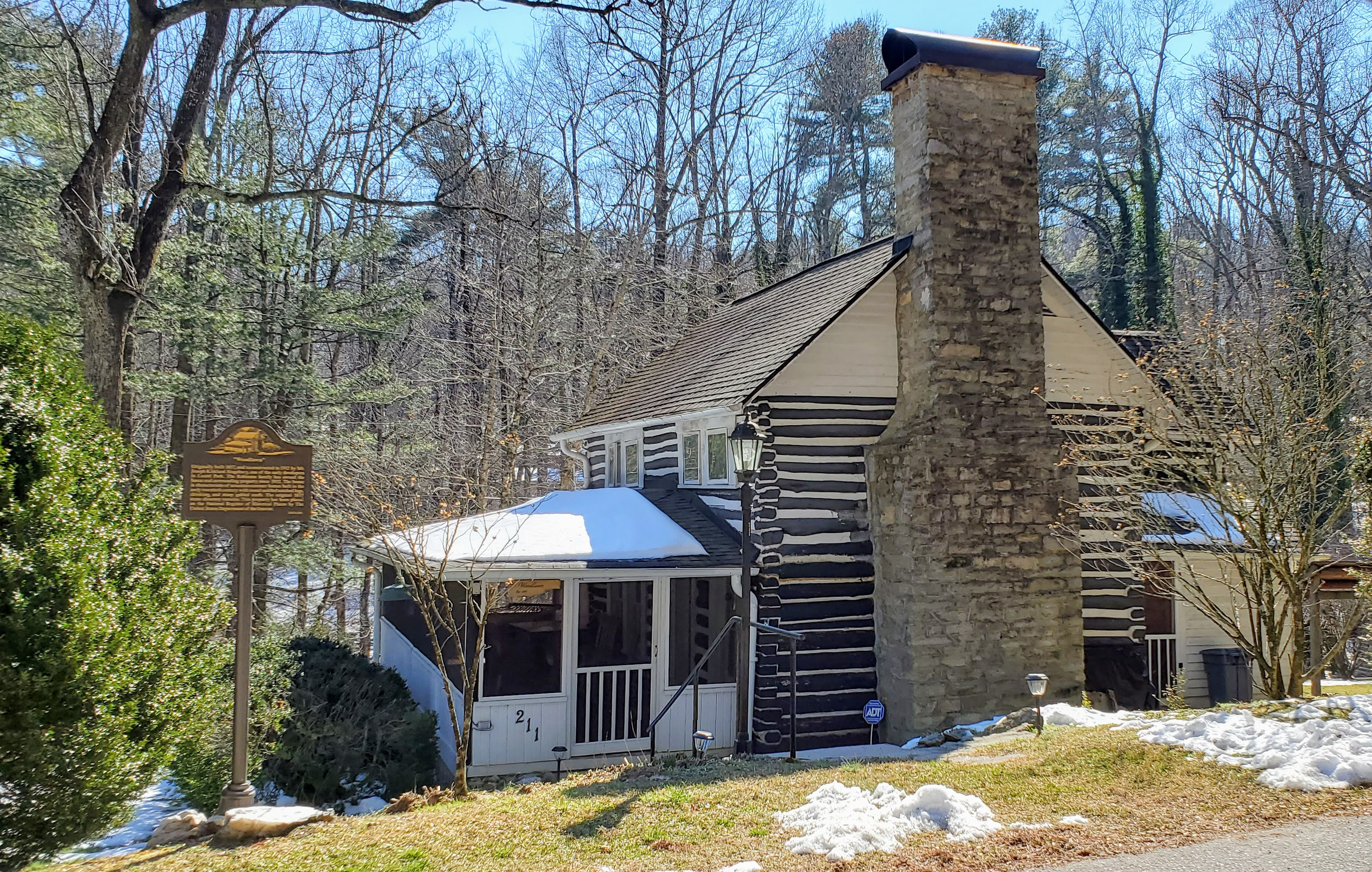
- Singletary-Reese-Robinson House, 2022

- Location within North Carolina Location within the United States
- Location: 211 Robinson Ln., Laurel Park, North Carolina
- Coordinates: 35°18′38″N 82°29′57″W
- Area: 15.32 acres (6.20 ha)
- Built: 1912, 1932
- Architectural style: Rustic Revival
- NRHP reference No.: 10000754
- Added to NRHP: September 16, 2010

Singletary-Reese-Robinson House, also known as Woodlawn, is a historic home located at Laurel Park, Henderson County, North Carolina. It was built in 1912, and is a two-story, "L"-form, Rustic Revival style log dwelling. It has a two-story rear wing addition and features a hip-roof wraparound porch. Also on the property are the contributing spring (1912), barn (1912), and a 19th-century log spring house.

It was listed on the National Register of Historic Places in 2010.
