= Bryn Avon =

Historic house in North Carolina, United States

- U.S. National Register of Historic Places
- U.S. Historic district
- Location within North Carolina Location within the United States
- Location: Junction of River Rd. and Mallett Rd., near Etowah, North Carolina
- Coordinates: 35°17′48″N 82°34′14″W
- Area: 127.9 acres (51.8 ha)
- Built: 1910-1920
- Built by: Bell, Jesse W.
- Architectural style: Tudor Revival, Rustic
- NRHP reference No.: 99000437
- Added to NRHP: April 9, 1999

Bryn Avon is a historic estate and national historic district located near Etowah, Henderson County, North Carolina. Bryn Avon house was built about 1884-1886 and updated in the 1910-1920s in the Tudor Revival style. It is a 1 1/2-story, stone and half-timbered manor house. Other contributing resources include the estate landscape and terraced garden and four smaller family cottages: the Mallett Cottage (c. 1925); the Brown house playhouse (c. 1932); Yon Way-the Conrow cottage (c. 1920–1925) and Mr. Conrow's studio (c. 1925–1935); and the Bellamy Cottage (c. 1933–1938).

It was listed on the National Register of Historic Places in 1999.
