= West Side Historic District (Hendersonville, North Carolina) =

Historic district in North Carolina, United States

- U.S. National Register of Historic Places
- U.S. Historic district
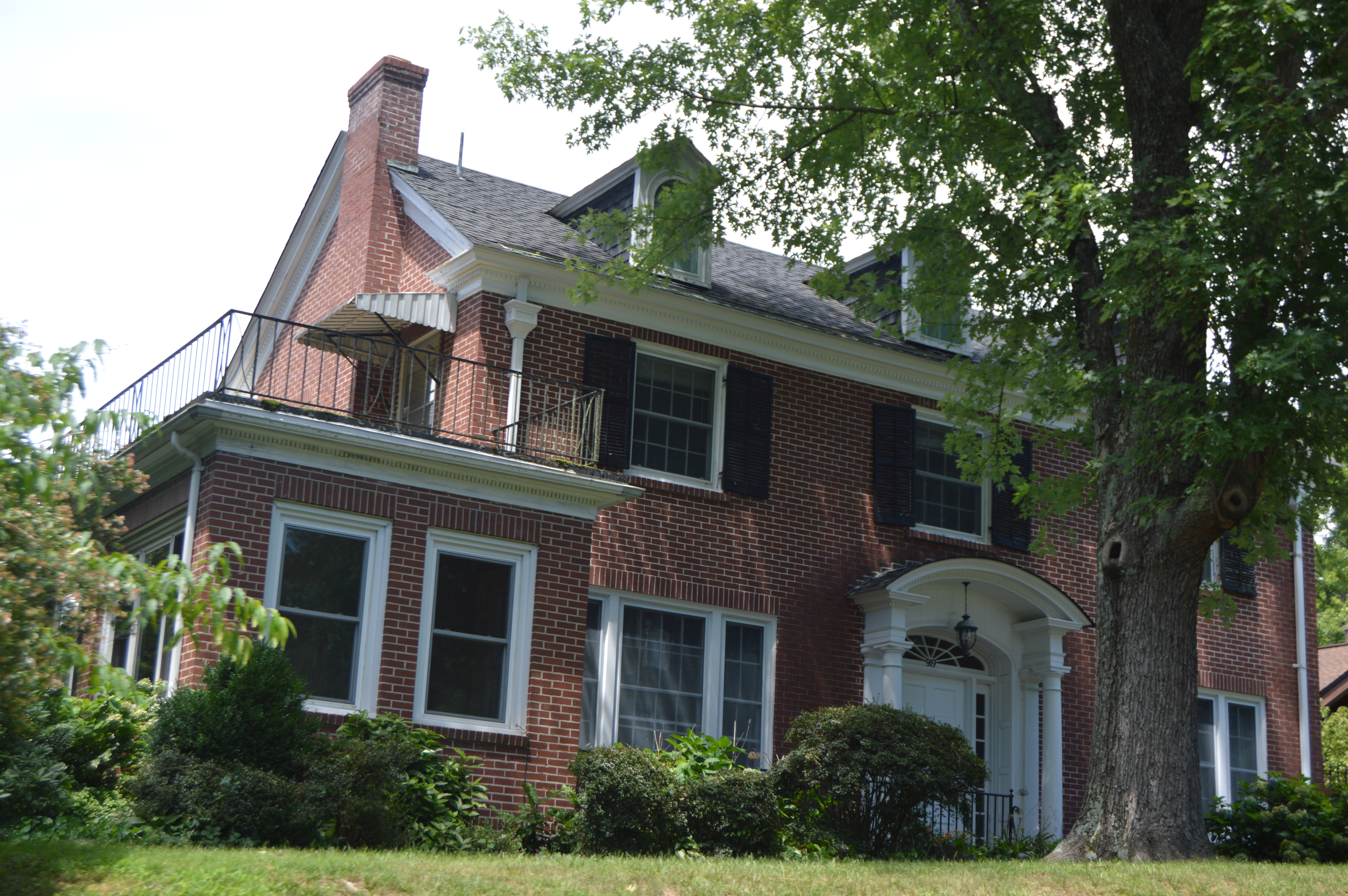
- House on Fourth Avenue

- Location within North Carolina Location within the United States
- Location: Roughly bounded by Fifth Ave. W., Washington St., Third Ave. W., and Blythe St., Hendersonville, North Carolina
- Coordinates: 35°18′56″N 82°28′12″W
- Area: 111 acres (45 ha)
- Architect: Stillwell, Erle; Smith, Richard Sharp
- Architectural style: Bungalow/craftsman, Colonial Revival, et al.
- MPS: Hendersonville MPS
- NRHP reference No.: 01001424
- Added to NRHP: December 31, 2001

West Side Historic District is a national historic district located at Hendersonville, Henderson County, North Carolina. The district encompasses 245 contributing buildings in a predominantly residential section of Hendersonville developed from the early 1900s to the late 1940s. It includes notable examples of Colonial Revival, and Bungalow / American Craftsman residential architecture. Located in the district is the contributing Ambassador Apartments (c. 1926) and Rosa Edwards Elementary School (c. 1910).

It was listed on the National Register of Historic Places in 2001.
