= Erle Stillwell House II =

Historic house in North Carolina, United States

- U.S. National Register of Historic Places
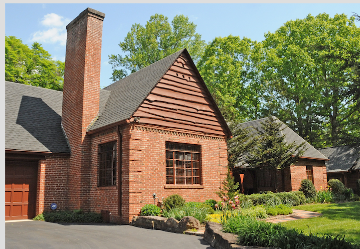

- Location within North Carolina Location within the United States
- Location: 541 Blythe St., Hendersonville, North Carolina
- Coordinates: 35°19′3″N 82°28′41″W
- Area: 0.6 acres (0.24 ha)
- Built: 1935
- Architect: Stillwell, Erle
- Architectural style: Tudor Revival, French Eclectic
- NRHP reference No.: 02000933
- Added to NRHP: September 6, 2002

Erle Stillwell House II is a historic home located at Hendersonville, Henderson County, North Carolina. It was built in 1935, and is a one-story, eclectic French Eclectic brick dwelling with some Tudor Revival style design elements. It has a multi-gable and hip roof and a massive brick chimney at the juncture between the main house and the garage wing. The recessed front entry porch features heavy-timbered arches and curved rafters, with a projecting front gable bay. It was designed and built by locally prominent architect Erle Stillwell, who built the neighboring Erle Stillwell House in 1926.

It was listed on the National Register of Historic Places in 2002.
