= The Meadows (Fletcher, North Carolina) =

Historic house in North Carolina, United States

- U.S. National Register of Historic Places
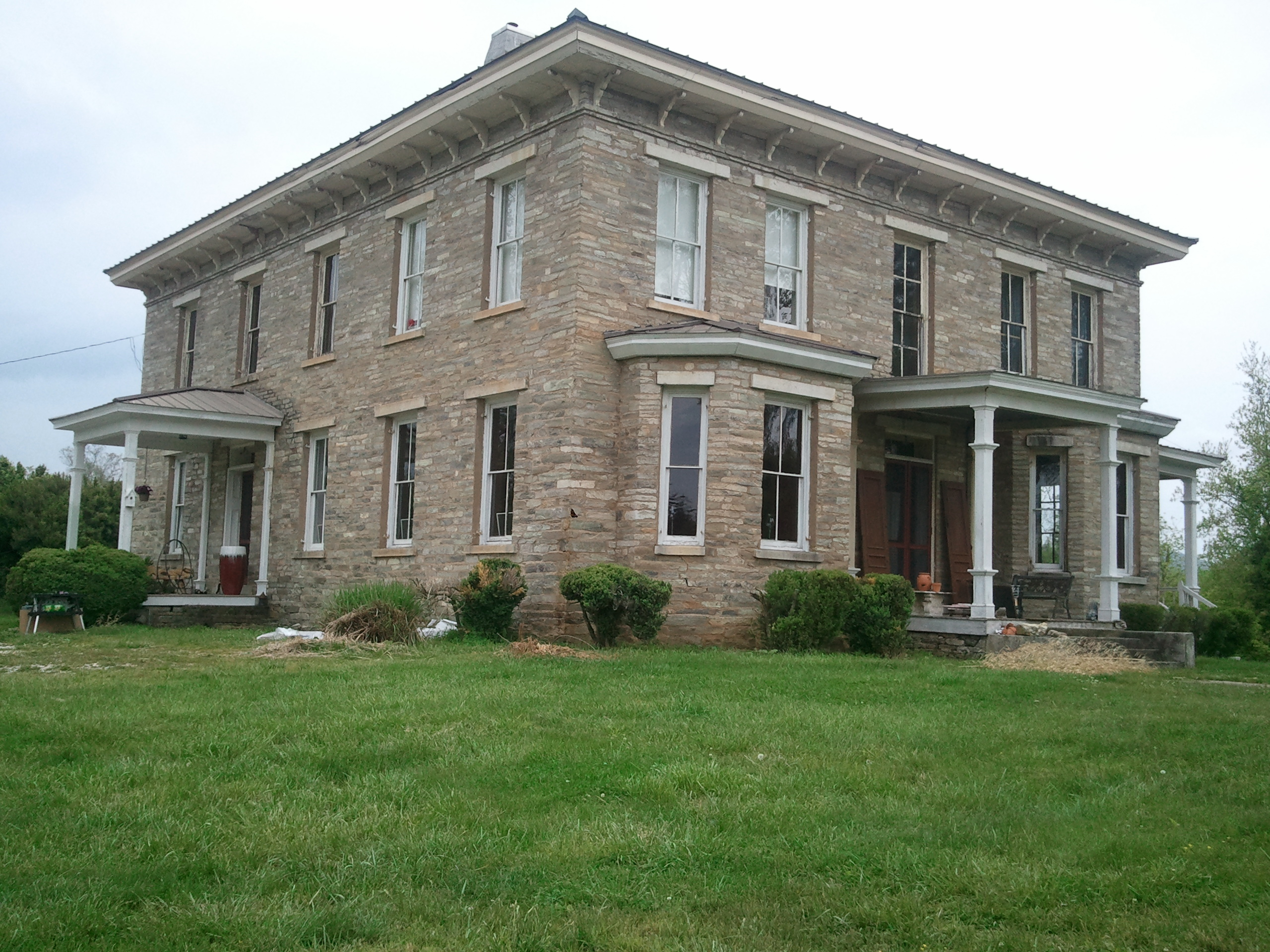

- Location within North Carolina Location within the United States
- Location: North of Fletcher on SR 1547, near Fletcher, North Carolina
- Coordinates: 35°26′11″N 82°29′41″W
- Area: 10 acres (4.0 ha)
- Built: c. 1860
- Architectural style: Italianate
- NRHP reference No.: 80002847; 100003297 (decrease)

Significant dates
- Added to NRHP: January 11, 1980
- Boundary decrease: January 10, 2019

The Meadows, also known as The Blake House, is a historic home located near Fletcher, Henderson County, North Carolina. It was built about 1860, and is a two-story, granite rubble stone dwelling in the Italianate style. It has a low hipped roof pierced with three interior chimneys and a two-story rear extension. The front facade features a one-bay porch flanked by semi-hexagonal bays.

It was listed on the National Register of Historic Places in 1980.
