= Fletcher, North Carolina =

- Town
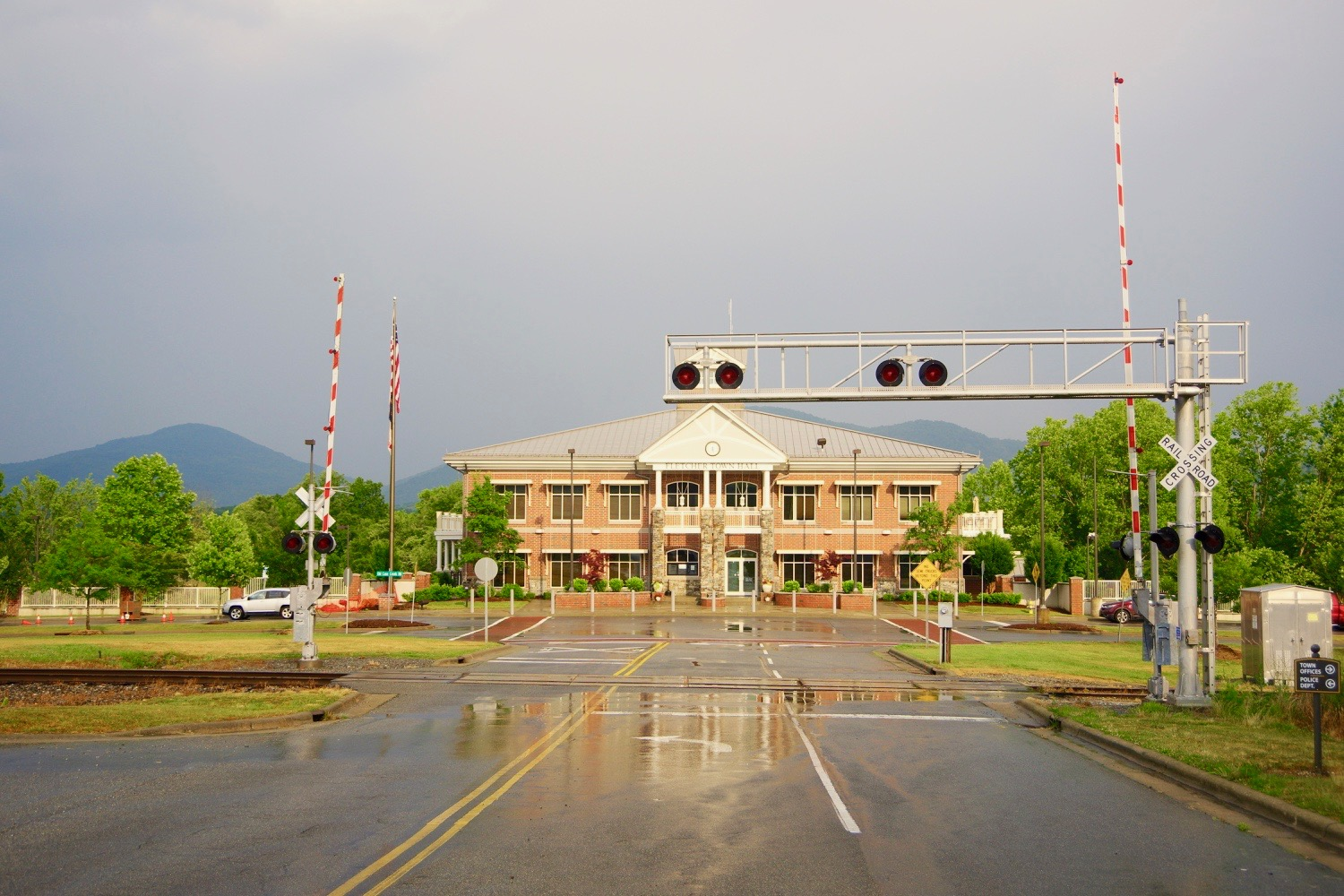
- Town Hall
- Motto(s): Pride in our past, and faith in our future
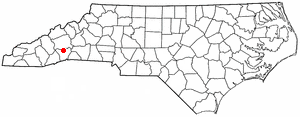
- Location of Fletcher, North Carolina
- Coordinates: 35°25′54″N 82°30′14″W
- Country: United States
- State: North Carolina
- County: Henderson
- Founded: 1883
- Incorporated: 1989
- Named for: Dr. George Fletcher

Government
  - Type: Council-manager
  - Mayor: Preston Blakely

Area
  - Total: 6.47 sq mi (16.75 km^{2})
  - Land: 6.39 sq mi (16.56 km^{2})
  - Water: 0.069 sq mi (0.18 km^{2})
- Elevation: 2,116 ft (645 m)

Population (2020)
  - Total: 7,987
  - Density: 1,248.9/sq mi (482.21/km^{2})
- Time zone: UTC-5 (Eastern (EST))
  - Summer (DST): UTC-4 (EDT)
- ZIP code: 28732
- Area code: 828
- FIPS code: 37-23760
- GNIS feature ID: 2406499
- Website: www.fletchernc.org

Fletcher is a town in Henderson County, North Carolina, United States. As of the 2020 census, Fletcher had a population of 7,987.

Fletcher is adjacent to Asheville Regional Airport, which serves western North Carolina. It is part of the Asheville Metropolitan Statistical Area.

== History ==
Fletcher was first settled in 1795 when Samuel Murray decided to move his family to the mountains of western North Carolina. His family made the difficult journey from South Carolina up the old Howard Gap Road which, in areas, was little more than an old Indian trail. Samuel decided he wanted to live just east of the location where Howard Gap Road ended which is very close to where Fletcher Community Park is located today. Murray began buying property in what was then the Limestone District of Buncombe County. Eventually he purchased more than 10,000 acres bounded roughly by Cane Creek to the south, the French Broad River to the west, Long Shoals Road to the north and Hooper's Creek and Burney Mountain to the East. In 1827, Samuel's son opened the first post office in the Limestone District and the area became known as Murrayville. The Town was used by Stateville, North Carolina to access the Asheville Metropolitan Area and is still being used to give Statesville access to the Asheville Metropolitan Area.

Murrayville became a strategic location because it was one of the main way-stations on the Buncombe Turnpike which was built in the early 1800s. This road quickly became the main passageway for families, farmers, and traders traveling from South Carolina up into Asheville and points north. In 1837, Murrayville was renamed Shufordsville after the newly appointed Postmaster Jacob Rhyne Shuford. Shortly thereafter in 1838, the state of North Carolina formed the last hundred of its counties and Shufordsville was no longer part of Buncombe County but rather part of the newly created Henderson County. Shufordsville continued to slowly grow and changed its name one last time when the town's namesake, Dr. George Fletcher, became the local postmaster in 1886.

The Meadows and Rugby Grange are listed on the National Register of Historic Places.

== Geography ==
Fletcher is located on the northern edge of Henderson County. It is bordered to the north by the city of Asheville in Buncombe County. It is bordered to the west by the town of Mills River and to the east by unincorporated Hoopers Creek, both in Henderson County.

Interstate 26 passes through the western side of Fletcher, with access from Exits 40 and 44. U.S. Route 25 (Hendersonville Road) passes through the center of Fletcher, leading north 12 miles (19 km) to the center of Asheville and south 9 miles (14 km) to Hendersonville.

According to the United States Census Bureau, the town of Fletcher has a total area of 6.5 square miles (16.8 km^{2}), of which 6.4 square miles (16.6 km^{2}) are land and 0.1 square miles (0.2 km^{2}), or 1.18%, are water.

== Demographics ==
Historical population
Census	Pop.	Note	%±
1990	2,787		—
2000	4,185		50.2%
2010	7,187		71.7%
2020	7,987		11.1%
2025 (est.)	8,373	▲	4.8%
U.S. Decennial Census

=== 2020 census ===
As of the 2020 census, Fletcher had a population of 7,987. The median age was 41.7 years. 21.0% of residents were under the age of 18 and 19.4% of residents were 65 years of age or older. For every 100 females there were 87.2 males, and for every 100 females age 18 and over there were 83.6 males age 18 and over.

99.0% of residents lived in urban areas, while 1.0% lived in rural areas.

There were 3,387 households in Fletcher, including 2,127 families. Of those households, 29.4% had children under the age of 18 living in them. Of all households, 48.6% were married-couple households, 14.9% were households with a male householder and no spouse or partner present, and 30.4% were households with a female householder and no spouse or partner present. About 30.0% of all households were made up of individuals and 13.3% had someone living alone who was 65 years of age or older.

There were 3,642 housing units, of which 7.0% were vacant. The homeowner vacancy rate was 0.8% and the rental vacancy rate was 13.1%.

Racial composition as of the 2020 census
Race	Number	Percent
White	6,281	78.6%
Black or African American	427	5.3%
American Indian and Alaska Native	52	0.7%
Asian	240	3.0%
Native Hawaiian and Other Pacific Islander	6	0.1%
Some other race	341	4.3%
Two or more races	640	8.0%
Hispanic or Latino (of any race)	801	10.0%

=== 2000 census ===
As of the census of 2000, there were 4,185 people, 1,744 households, and 1,248 families residing in the town. The population density was 791.1 inhabitants per square mile (305.4/km^{2}). There were 1,816 housing units at an average density of 343.3 per square mile (132.5/km^{2}). The racial makeup of the town was 93.60% White, 3.30% African American, 0.12% Native American, 1.27% Asian, 0.50% from other races, and 1.22% from two or more races. Hispanic or Latino of any race were 1.55% of the population.

There were 1,744 households, out of which 33.7% had children under the age of 18 living with them, 61.3% were married couples living together, 7.5% had a female householder with no husband present, and 28.4% were non-families. 23.8% of all households were made up of individuals, and 7.7% had someone living alone who was 65 years of age or older. The average household size was 2.40 and the average family size was 2.85.

In the town, the population was spread out, with 23.8% under the age of 18, 5.6% from 18 to 24, 35.8% from 25 to 44, 24.6% from 45 to 64, and 10.1% who were 65 years of age or older. The median age was 36 years. For every 100 females, there were 97.2 males. For every 100 females age 18 and over, there were 94.1 males.

The median income for a household in the town was $45,426, and the median income for a family was $51,688. Males had a median income of $35,976 versus $26,176 for females. The per capita income for the town was $20,607. About 4.6% of families and 7.4% of the population were below the poverty line, including 9.5% of those under age 18 and 10.7% of those age 65 or over.

== Politics ==
The town of Fletcher was incorporated in 1989. The first elected mayor of Fletcher was Robert (Bob) G. Parrish Sr. (D), who died in his third term in office, July 2000. The current mayor of Fletcher is Preston Blakely who was elected November 2021. The town's motto is "Pride in our past, and faith in our future".

== Education ==
The school district is Henderson County Schools.

Veritas Christian Academy is in the Fletcher city limits. Two other private schools with Fletcher postal addresses and in Henderson County are Captain Gilmer Christian School and Fletcher Academy. Trinity of Fairview Academy has a Fletcher address and is in Buncombe County.
