= Erle Stillwell House =

Historic house in North Carolina, United States

- U.S. National Register of Historic Places
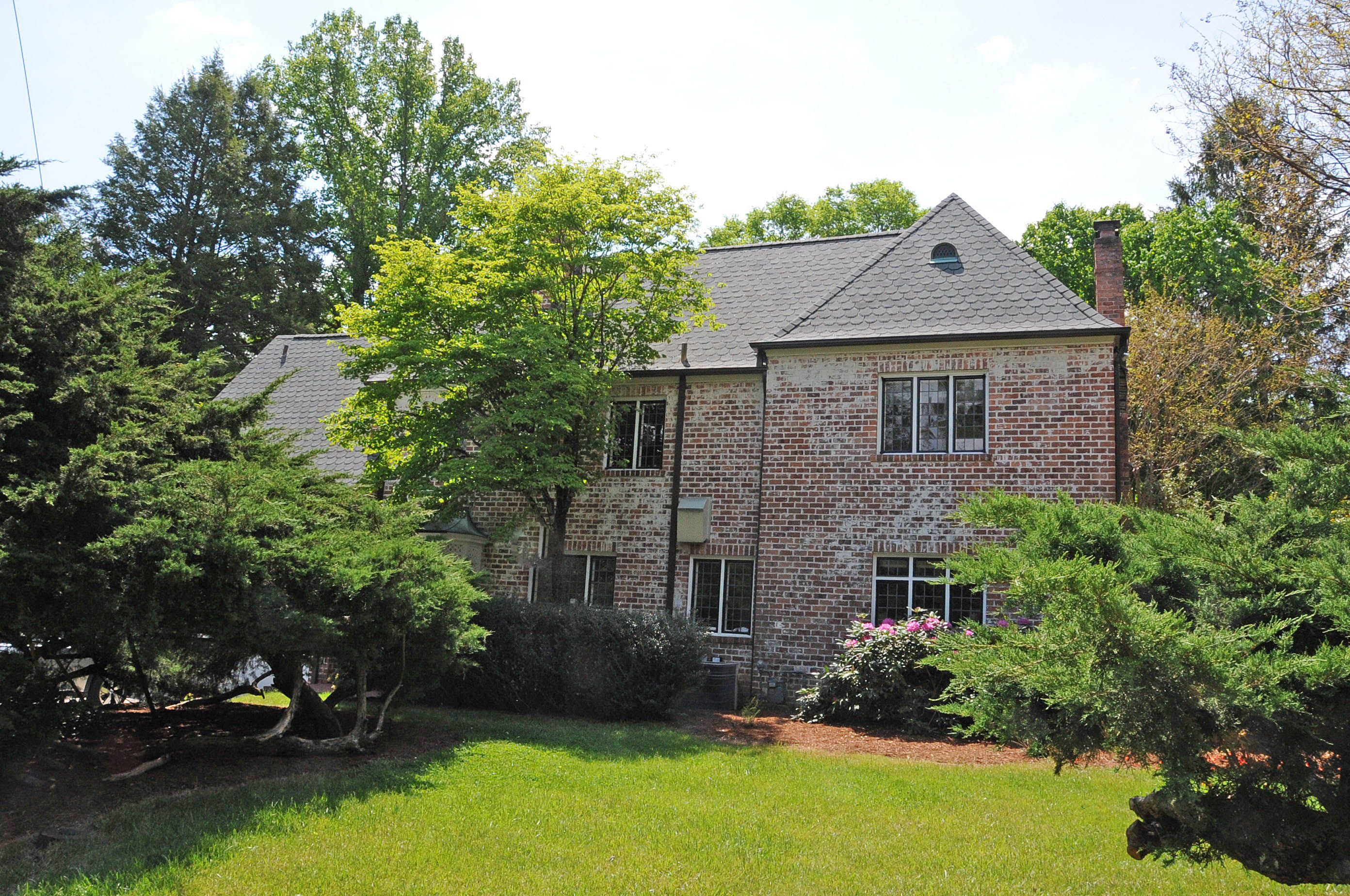

- Location within North Carolina Location within the United States
- Location: 1300 Pinecrest Dr., Hendersonville, North Carolina
- Coordinates: 35°19′5″N 82°28′43″W
- Area: less than one acre
- Built: 1926
- Architect: Stillwell, Erle
- Architectural style: Tudor Revival
- NRHP reference No.: 01000125
- Added to NRHP: November 20, 2001

Erle Stillwell House is a historic home located at Hendersonville, Henderson County, North Carolina. It was built in 1926, and is a two-story, L-plan Tudor Revival-style brick dwelling. It has a multi-gable and hip roof with flared gable ends and two brick chimneys with chimney pots. The entrance and sun porch are covered by ribbed copper roofs. It was designed and built by locally prominent architect Erle Stillwell, who built the neighboring Erle Stillwell House II in 1935.

It was listed on the National Register of Historic Places in 2001.
