= Valley Hill, North Carolina =

- Census-designated place
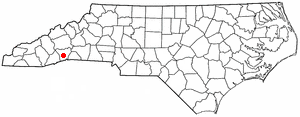
- Location of Valley Hill, North Carolina
- Coordinates: 35°17′54″N 82°28′59″W
- Country: United States
- State: North Carolina
- County: Henderson

Area
  - Total: 2.38 sq mi (6.16 km^{2})
  - Land: 2.32 sq mi (6.01 km^{2})
  - Water: 0.058 sq mi (0.15 km^{2})
- Elevation: 2,182 ft (665 m)

Population (2020)
  - Total: 2,207
  - Density: 951.6/sq mi (367.41/km^{2})
- Time zone: UTC-5 (Eastern (EST))
  - Summer (DST): UTC-4 (EDT)
- ZIP code: 28739
- Area code: 828
- FIPS code: 37-69640
- GNIS feature ID: 1023065

Valley Hill is an unincorporated community and census-designated place (CDP) in Henderson County, North Carolina, United States. As of the 2020 census, Valley Hill had a population of 2,207. It is part of the Asheville Metropolitan Statistical Area.

== Geography ==
Valley Hill is located in central Henderson County. It is bordered to the north by the town of Laurel Park and to the northeast by the city of Hendersonville, the county seat.

According to the United States Census Bureau, the CDP has a total area of 2.4 square miles (6.2 km^{2}), of which 2.3 square miles (6.0 km^{2}) are land and 0.1 square miles (0.2 km^{2}), or 2.52%, are water. Osceola Lake, a reservoir built on Shepherd Creek, is the largest water body in the community.

== Demographics ==
Historical population
Census	Pop.	Note	%±
2020	2,207		—
U.S. Decennial Census

=== 2020 census ===
As of the 2020 census, Valley Hill had a population of 2,207. The median age was 50.1 years. 15.8% of residents were under the age of 18 and 29.0% of residents were 65 years of age or older. For every 100 females there were 96.0 males, and for every 100 females age 18 and over there were 95.0 males age 18 and over.

100.0% of residents lived in urban areas, while 0.0% lived in rural areas.

There were 992 households in Valley Hill, of which 23.6% had children under the age of 18 living in them. Of all households, 49.1% were married-couple households, 20.1% were households with a male householder and no spouse or partner present, and 24.1% were households with a female householder and no spouse or partner present. About 31.8% of all households were made up of individuals and 17.6% had someone living alone who was 65 years of age or older.

There were 1,185 housing units, of which 16.3% were vacant. The homeowner vacancy rate was 0.7% and the rental vacancy rate was 10.2%.

Racial composition as of the 2020 census
Race	Number	Percent
White	1,874	84.9%
Black or African American	56	2.5%
American Indian and Alaska Native	18	0.8%
Asian	25	1.1%
Native Hawaiian and Other Pacific Islander	6	0.3%
Some other race	99	4.5%
Two or more races	129	5.8%
Hispanic or Latino (of any race)	173	7.8%

=== 2000 census ===
As of the census of 2000, there were 2,137 people, 891 households, and 598 families residing in the CDP. The population density was 904.4 inhabitants per square mile (349.2/km^{2}). There were 1,049 housing units at an average density of 443.9 per square mile (171.4/km^{2}). The racial makeup of the CDP was 94.81% White, 2.34% African American, 0.09% Native American, 1.22% Asian, 0.05% Pacific Islander, 0.56% from other races, and 0.94% from two or more races. Hispanic or Latino of any race were 5.62% of the population.

There were 891 households, out of which 25.7% had children under the age of 18 living with them, 57.0% were married couples living together, 7.3% had a female householder with no husband present, and 32.8% were non-families. 29.5% of all households were made up of individuals, and 12.6% had someone living alone who was 65 years of age or older. The average household size was 2.23 and the average family size was 2.73.

In the CDP, the population was spread out, with 18.2% under the age of 18, 5.2% from 18 to 24, 25.3% from 25 to 44, 25.6% from 45 to 64, and 25.5% who were 65 years of age or older. The median age was 46 years. For every 100 females, there were 93.2 males. For every 100 females age 18 and over, there were 88.7 males.

The median income for a household in the CDP was $32,250, and the median income for a family was $37,325. Males had a median income of $31,795 versus $21,932 for females. The per capita income for the CDP was $19,922. About 11.1% of families and 12.4% of the population were below the poverty line, including 21.2% of those under age 18 and 7.0% of those age 65 or over.
