= Henderson County Courthouse (North Carolina) =

Historic courthouse in North Carolina, US

- U.S. National Register of Historic Places
- U.S. Historic district – Contributing property
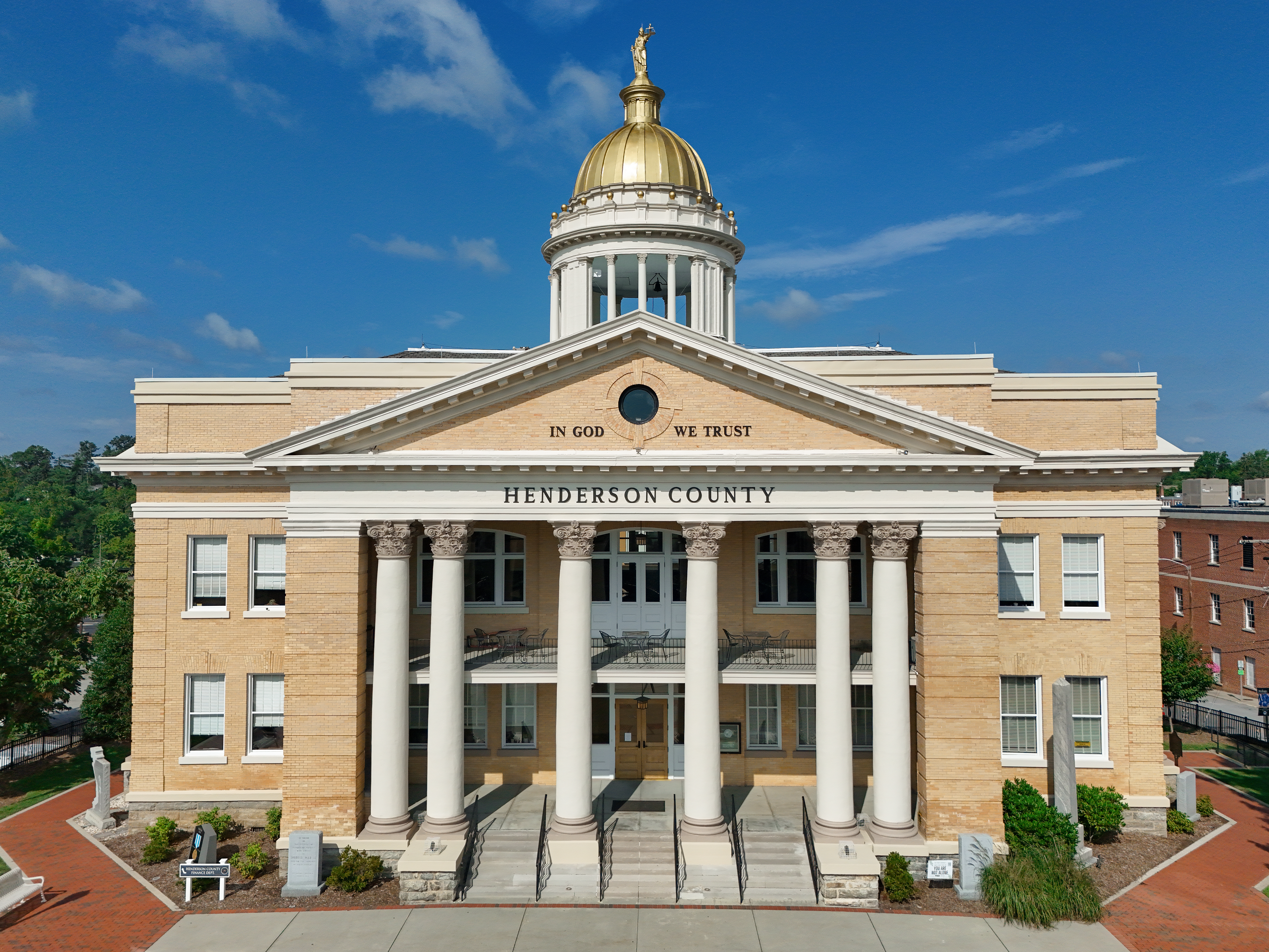
- Historic Henderson County Courthouse in 2025

- Location within North Carolina Location within the United States
- Location: One Historic Courthouse Square, 1st and Main Sts., Hendersonville, North Carolina
- Coordinates: 35°18′52″N 82°27′37″W
- Area: 1.3 acres (0.53 ha)
- Built: 1904–1905
- Built by: W.F. Edwards
- Architect: Richard Sharp Smith
- Architectural style: Classical Revival
- MPS: North Carolina County Courthouses TR
- NRHP reference No.: 79001723
- Added to NRHP: May 10, 1979

The Henderson County Courthouse, also known as the Historic Henderson County Courthouse and the Old Henderson County Courthouse, is a historic 3-story brick gold-domed Classical Revival style courthouse building located at One Historic Courthouse Square, corner of 1st and Main streets in Hendersonville, North Carolina.

It is Henderson County's second courthouse and is adjacent to site of the 1840s courthouse which was razed upon its completion. Famed architect Frank Pierce Milburn was asked in 1903 to design the new courthouse, but the county commissioners rejected his design and instead hired Englishman Richard Sharp Smith, who was the resident architect of the Biltmore Estate after the death of Richard Morris Hunt in 1895. Construction by local builder W. F. Edwards began in 1904 and was completed in July, 1905.

The old courthouse was closed for renovations after the completion of a new courthouse at 200 North Grove Street in 1995. The restored 1905 courthouse currently houses the Henderson County Heritage Museum and some government offices.

On May 10, 1979, the Historic Henderson County Courthouse was added to the National Register of Historic Places. It is located in the Main Street Historic District.
