= Rugby Grange =

Historic house in North Carolina, United States

- U.S. National Register of Historic Places
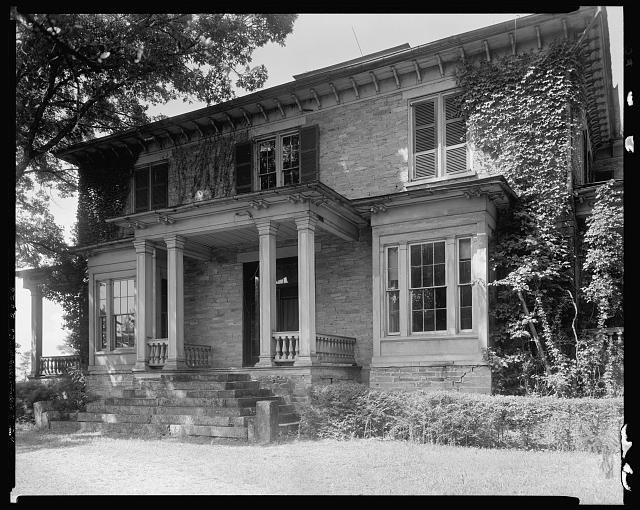

- Location within North Carolina Location within the United States
- Nearest city: Fletcher, North Carolina
- Coordinates: 35°25′15″N 82°31′15″W
- Area: 300.2 acres (121.5 ha)
- Built: 1860
- Architectural style: Italianate
- NRHP reference No.: 86003748
- Added to NRHP: May 5, 1987

The Rugby Grange, near Fletcher, Henderson County, North Carolina, was built in 1860 in Italianate architecture. The property includes agricultural outbuildings, agricultural fields and secondary structure, a total of 12 contributing buildings and one other contributing site. They include Rugby Lodge II, the "Big House", the Cottage, the Shanty, Uncle Martin's and Uncle Billy's cabins, the ice house, and several barns.

It was listed on the National Register of Historic Places in 1987.

The house was the one-time home of a Swedish diplomat named George Westfeldt. He bought the property before the Civil War and named it in honor of Rugby School, an English public school.
