= Main Street Historic District (Hendersonville, North Carolina) =

Historic district in North Carolina, United States

- U.S. National Register of Historic Places
- U.S. Historic district
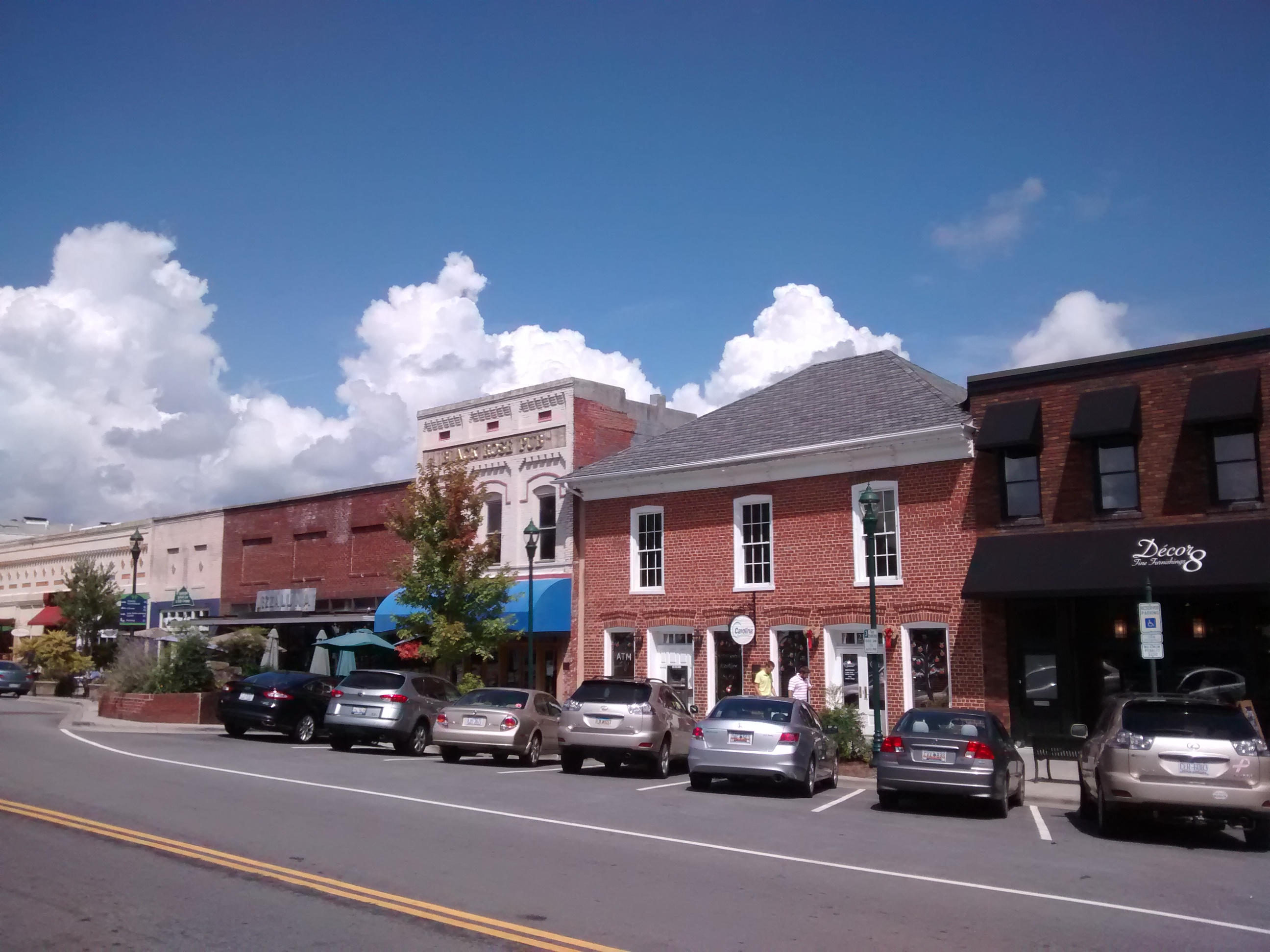
- Historic Hendersonville, September 2014

- Location within North Carolina Location within the United States
- Location: Main St. between Sixth Ave. East and First Ave. East; Roughly N. Main St., Second Ave. W, W. Allen St., N. Washington and First Ave. E., Hendersonville, North Carolina
- Coordinates: 35°18′59″N 82°27′37″W
- Area: 34 acres (14 ha)
- Built: 1850
- Architect: Smith, Richard Sharpe; Stilwell, Erle
- Architectural style: Classical Revival, Chicago, Commercial Style
- MPS: Hendersonville MPS
- NRHP reference No.: 89000028, 06001140 (Boundary Increase)
- Added to NRHP: March 30, 1989, December 20, 2006 (Boundary Increase)

Main Street Historic District is a national historic district located at Hendersonville, Henderson County, North Carolina. The district encompasses 65 contributing buildings in the central business district of Hendersonville. The commercial and governmental buildings include notable examples of Classical Revival architecture. Located in the district is the separately listed Henderson County Courthouse. Other notable buildings include the Huggins Building (c. 1850), Cole Bank Building (c. 1880), Justus Pharmacy, Davis Store block (1900), The Federal Building (1914), Maxwell Store Building (c. 1910), Pace's Market (c. 1925), J. C. Penney Building (1939), and Lampley Motors (c. 1945).

It was listed on the National Register of Historic Places in 1989, with a boundary increase in 2006.

== Gallery ==
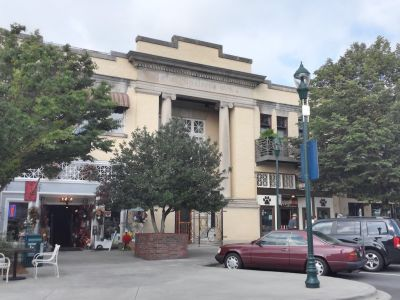
Peoples National Bank, 2014

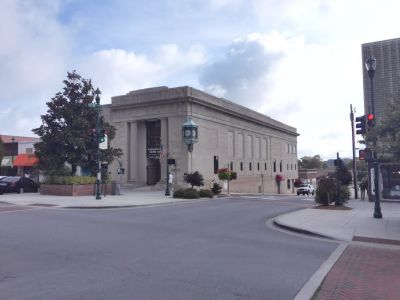
Old State Trust Company and Citizen's Bank, 2014

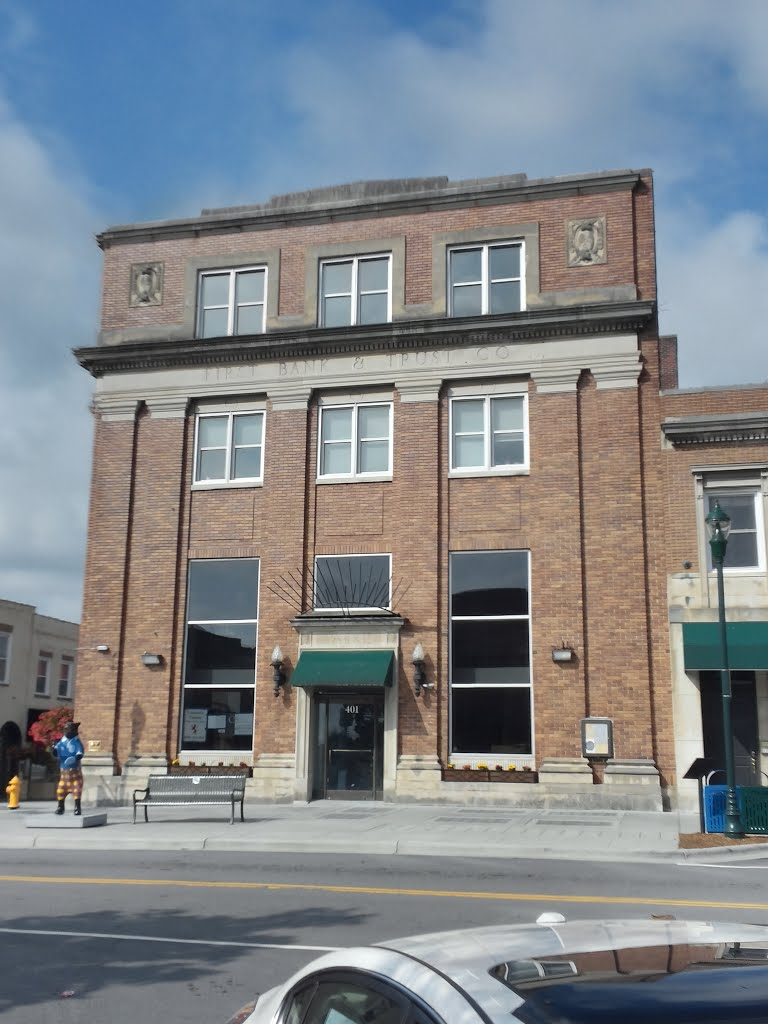
First Bank & Trust Company Building, 2014

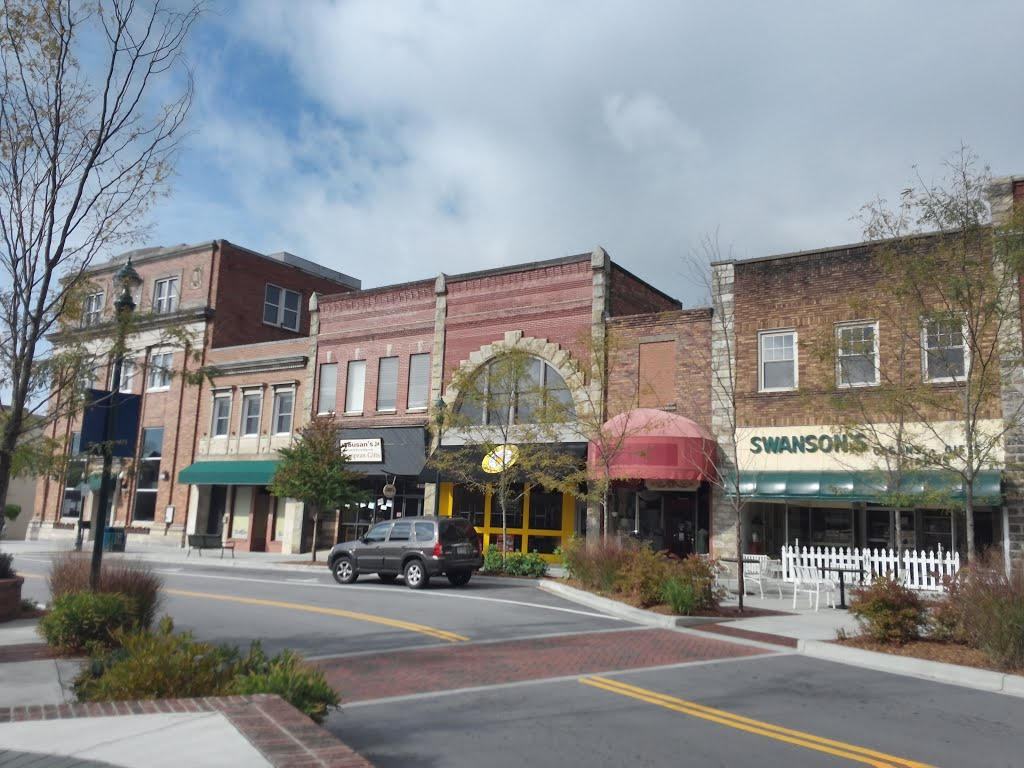
400 Block of N. Main Street, 2014

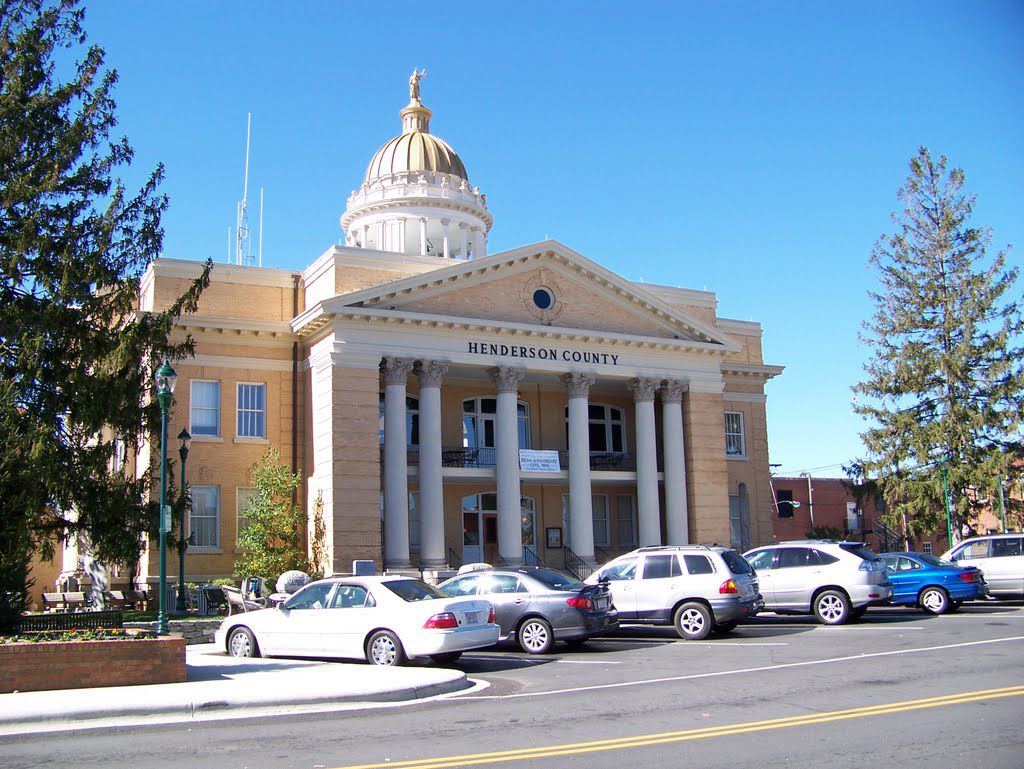
Henderson County Courthouse, 2009
