= Euonymus aculeatus =

Scientific classification
- Kingdom: Plantae
- Clade: Tracheophytes
- Clade: Angiosperms
- Clade: Eudicots
- Clade: Rosids
- Order: Celastrales
- Family: Celastraceae
- Genus: Euonymus
- Species: E. aculeatus

Binomial name
- Euonymus aculeatus Hemsl.

Synonyms
- Echinocarpus hederaerhiza H.Lév.

Species of plant

Euonymus aculeatus, the prickly spindle, is a species of flowering plant in the family Celastraceae. It is native to southern China. A scrambling evergreen shrub reaching 2 to 3 m (7 to 10 ft), it is typically found in forests and scrublands from 300 to 1,500 m (1,000 to 4,900 ft) above sea level. Valued for the visual appeal of its prickly orange fruit, it can be trained to climb up a garden wall, or be used as a ground cover.
