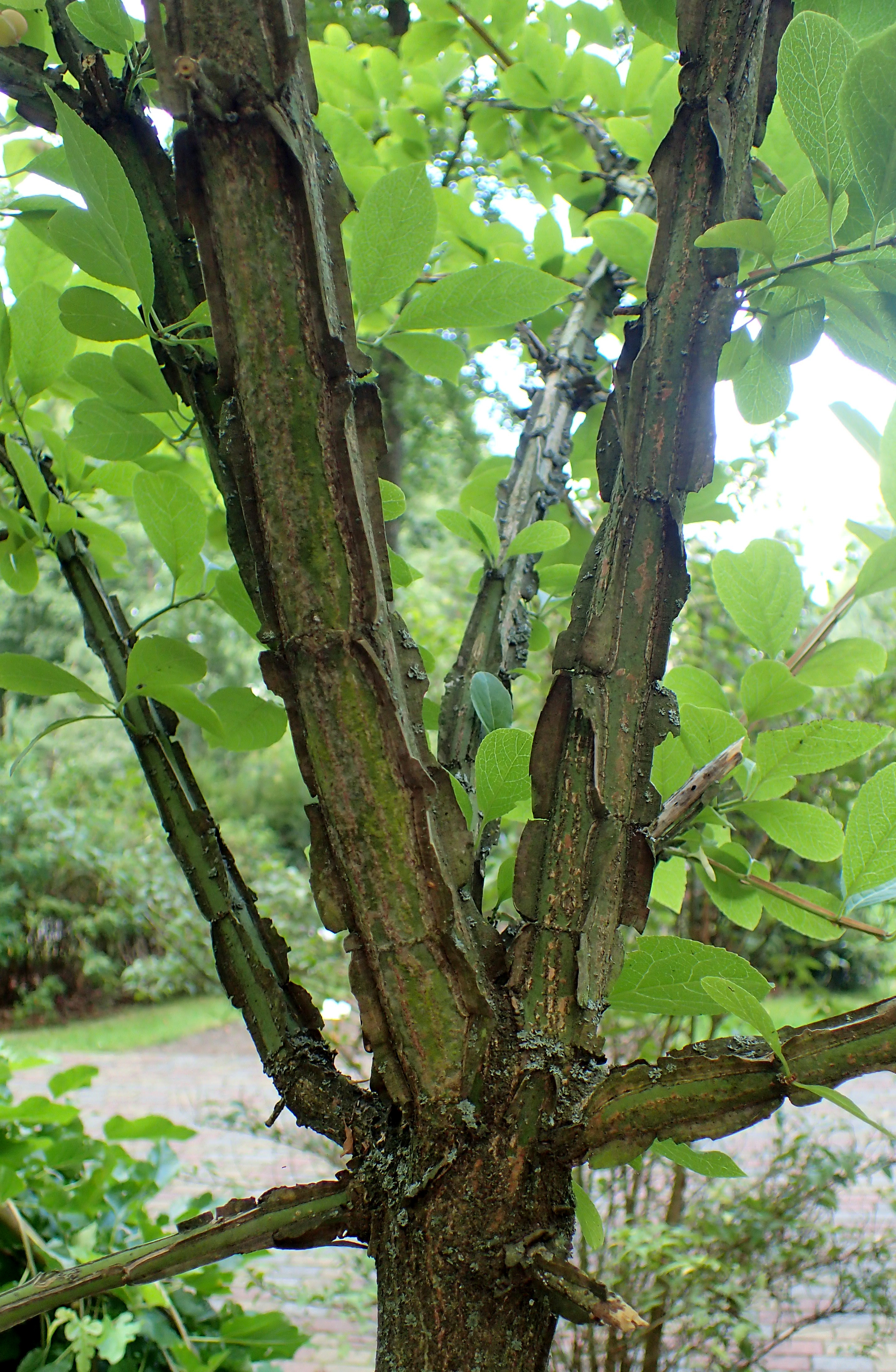

Scientific classification
- Kingdom: Plantae
- Clade: Tracheophytes
- Clade: Angiosperms
- Clade: Eudicots
- Clade: Rosids
- Order: Celastrales
- Family: Celastraceae
- Genus: Euonymus
- Species: E. phellomanus

Binomial name
- Euonymus phellomanus Loes.

= Euonymus phellomanus =

Species of flowering plant

Euonymus phellomanus (corky spindle) is a species of flowering plant in the family Celastraceae. It is native to China. A substantial deciduous shrub growing to 2–4 m (6.6–13.1 ft) tall by 2.5 m (8.2 ft) broad, it produces insignificant yellow-green flowers in May followed by brilliant pink fruit in autumn. Like other spindles, the fruit break open to reveal bright orange seeds when ripe. A notable feature is the rough corky bark which with age develops "wings" clothing the length of each branch; the element phellos in its name is from the Ancient Greek for cork. A similar effect is seen in the related Euonymus alatus (winged spindle).

In cultivation this hardy plant is very adaptable, accepting moist or dry soil in full or partial sunshine. In the UK it has gained the Royal Horticultural Society's Award of Garden Merit.
