= Mills River Chapel =

Historic chapel in North Carolina, US

- U.S. National Register of Historic Places
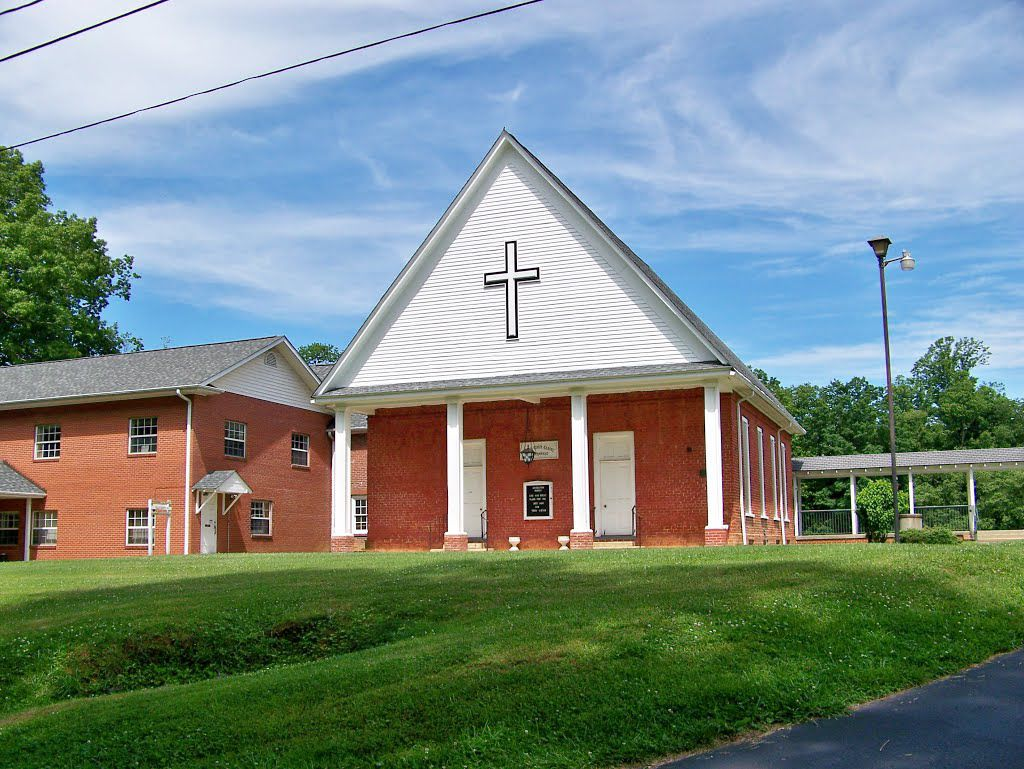

- Location within North Carolina Location within the United States
- Location: SR 1328, 0.7 miles (1.1 km) north of junction with NC 280, near Mills River, North Carolina
- Coordinates: 35°23′4″N 82°34′39″W
- Area: 2.3 acres (0.93 ha)
- Built: 1860-1861
- Architect: Barnett, Americas
- Architectural style: Greek Revival
- NRHP reference No.: 88002660
- Added to NRHP: December 02, 1988

Mills River Chapel, also known as Mills River United Methodist Church, is a historic Methodist chapel located near Mills River, Henderson County, North Carolina. It was built in 1860–1861, and is a one-story, rectangular, vernacular Greek Revival-style church. It features a front portico with four, square, recessed panel wooden columns. Adjacent to the church is the contributing church cemetery, with gravestones dating from as early as 1824.

It was listed on the National Register of Historic Places in 1988.
