= Etowah, North Carolina =

Census-designated place in Henderson County, North Carolina, USA

- Census-designated place
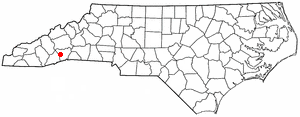
- Location of Etowah, North Carolina
- Coordinates: 35°18′22″N 82°35′25″W
- Country: United States
- State: North Carolina
- County: Henderson

Area
  - Total: 17.88 sq mi (46.30 km^{2})
  - Land: 17.66 sq mi (45.75 km^{2})
  - Water: 0.21 sq mi (0.55 km^{2})
- Elevation: 2,182 ft (665 m)

Population (2020)
  - Total: 7,642
  - Density: 432.7/sq mi (167.06/km^{2})
- Time zone: UTC-5 (Eastern (EST))
  - Summer (DST): UTC-4 (EDT)
- ZIP code: 28729
- Area code: 828
- FIPS code: 37-21880
- GNIS feature ID: 2402462

Etowah is an unincorporated community and census-designated place (CDP) in Henderson County, North Carolina, United States. As of the 2020 census, Etowah had a population of 7,642. It is part of the Asheville Metropolitan Statistical Area.

== History ==
Bryn Avon was listed on the National Register of Historic Places in 1999.

== Geography ==
Etowah is located in western Henderson County in the valley of the French Broad River. It is bordered to the north by the town of Mills River, to the northeast by unincorporated Horse Shoe, and to the west by Transylvania County.

U.S. Route 64 passes through Etowah, leading east 8 miles (13 km) to Hendersonville and southwest 11 miles (18 km) to Brevard.

According to the United States Census Bureau, the Etowah CDP has a total area of 17.8 square miles (46.0 km^{2}), of which 17.5 square miles (45.4 km^{2}) are land and 0.2 square miles (0.5 km^{2}), or 1.20%, are water.

== Demographics ==
Historical population
Census	Pop.	Note	%±
2020	7,642		—
U.S. Decennial Census

=== 2020 census ===
Etowah racial composition
Race	Number	Percentage
White (non-Hispanic)	6,547	85.67%
Black or African American (non-Hispanic)	130	1.7%
Native American	14	0.18%
Asian	75	0.98%
Pacific Islander	5	0.07%
Other/Mixed	311	4.07%
Hispanic or Latino	560	7.33%

As of the 2020 census, Etowah had a population of 7,642. The median age was 53.7 years. 17.1% of residents were under the age of 18 and 32.4% of residents were 65 years of age or older. For every 100 females there were 92.1 males, and for every 100 females age 18 and over there were 89.7 males age 18 and over.

0.0% of residents lived in urban areas, while 100.0% lived in rural areas.

There were 3,284 households in Etowah, of which 20.2% had children under the age of 18 living in them. There were 2,408 families residing in the CDP. Of all households, 58.9% were married-couple households, 14.3% were households with a male householder and no spouse or partner present, and 22.3% were households with a female householder and no spouse or partner present. About 26.1% of all households were made up of individuals and 15.8% had someone living alone who was 65 years of age or older.

There were 3,680 housing units, of which 10.8% were vacant. The homeowner vacancy rate was 1.4% and the rental vacancy rate was 3.8%.

=== 2000 census ===
As of the census of 2000, there were 2,766 people, 1,280 households, and 938 families residing in the CDP. The population density was 603.6 inhabitants per square mile (233.1/km^{2}). There were 1,365 housing units at an average density of 297.9 per square mile (115.0/km^{2}). The racial makeup of the CDP was 96.78% White, 1.70% African American, 0.14% Native American, 0.58% Asian, 0.14% Pacific Islander, 0.14% from other races, and 0.51% from two or more races. Hispanic or Latino of any race were 0.87% of the population.

There were 1,280 households, out of which 18.7% had children under the age of 18 living with them, 63.7% were married couples living together, 7.0% had a female householder with no husband present, and 26.7% were non-families. 24.7% of all households were made up of individuals, and 13.7% had someone living alone who was 65 years of age or older. The average household size was 2.16 and the average family size was 2.53.

In the CDP, the population was spread out, with 15.8% under the age of 18, 5.4% from 18 to 24, 21.6% from 25 to 44, 27.6% from 45 to 64, and 29.7% who were 65 years of age or older. The median age was 51 years. For every 100 females, there were 92.5 males. For every 100 females age 18 and over, there were 89.4 males.

The median income for a household in the CDP was $38,438, and the median income for a family was $45,041. Males had a median income of $30,525 versus $22,212 for females. The per capita income for the CDP was $20,849. About 2.3% of families and 5.9% of the population were below the poverty line, including 7.7% of those under age 18 and 6.2% of those age 65 or over.
