= Mills River, North Carolina =

- Town
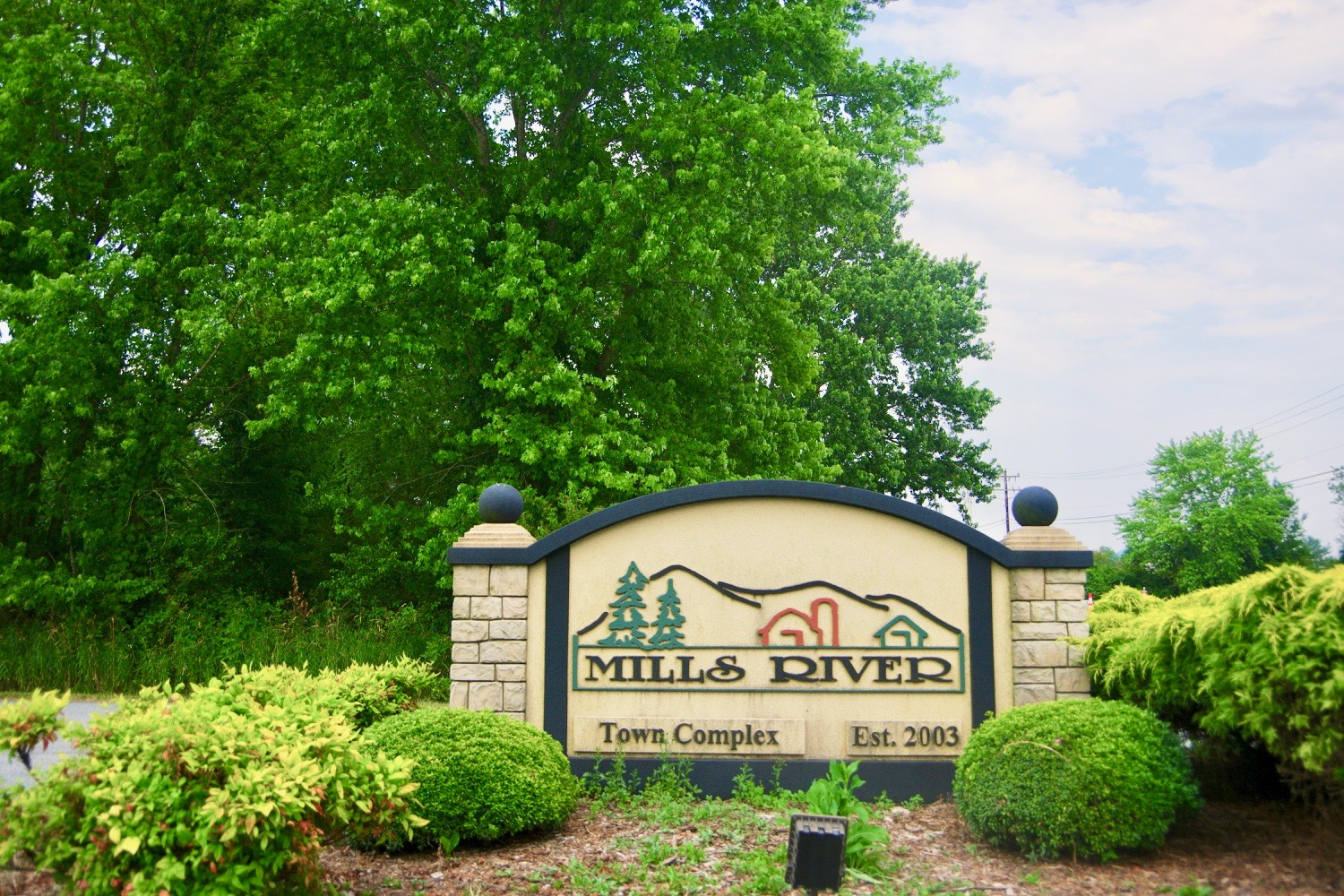
- Town Complex entrance

- Location within North Carolina Location within the United States
- Coordinates: 35°23′07″N 82°35′07″W
- Country: United States
- State: North Carolina
- County: Henderson
- Incorporated: 2003
- Named for: Mills River

Area
  - Total: 22.49 sq mi (58.24 km^{2})
  - Land: 22.31 sq mi (57.79 km^{2})
  - Water: 0.17 sq mi (0.45 km^{2})
- Elevation: 2,182 ft (665 m)

Population (2020)
  - Total: 7,078
  - Density: 317.2/sq mi (122.48/km^{2})
- Time zone: UTC-5 (Eastern (EST))
  - Summer (DST): UTC-4 (EDT)
- ZIP codes: 28732, 28759
- Area code: 828
- FIPS code: 37-43260
- GNIS feature ID: 2406166
- Website: www.millsriver.gov

Mills River is a town in Henderson County, North Carolina, United States. The population was 6,802 at the 2010 census, and was estimated to be 7,406 in 2019. The town took its name from the nearby confluence of the Mills River and French Broad River. It is part of the Asheville Metropolitan Statistical Area. It was incorporated into a town in June 2003. Sierra Nevada opened a brewery in Mills River in 2014.

== History ==
Prior to European colonization a large Cherokee settlement existed within the borders of Mills River.

Mills River is among the oldest communities in Henderson County, with its first landholder receiving a deed from the state of North Carolina in 1788. It was once a thriving agricultural community, often called the "fertile crescent".

The Mills River Chapel was listed on the National Register of Historic Places in 1988.

== Geography ==
Mills River lies in the northwestern part of Henderson County, extending northeast to the Buncombe County border and southwest to the Transylvania County border. It is bordered to the northeast by the city of Asheville and the town of Fletcher, and to the south by the unincorporated communities of Horse Shoe and Etowah.

According to the U.S. Census Bureau, the town has a total area of 22.5 square miles (58.4 km^{2}), of which 22.4 square miles (58.0 km^{2}) are land and 0.2 square miles (0.4 km^{2}), or 0.74%, are water. The French Broad River, one of the primary tributaries of the Tennessee River, flows through the northeastern part of the town. The Mills River, a tributary of the French Broad, flows from west to east through the center of the town, and the southern part of the town is in the valley of Boylston Creek, a small tributary of the French Broad.

The town lies within minutes of Pisgah National Forest, Interstate 26, and Asheville Regional Airport. Highways 280 and 191 serve as the major arteries and provide access to the nearby cities of Asheville, 17 miles (27 km) to the north; Hendersonville, 8 miles (13 km) to the southeast; and Brevard, 14 miles (23 km) to the southwest.

== Demographics ==
Historical population
Census	Pop.	Note	%±
2010	6,802		—
2020	7,078		4.1%
2025 (est.)	7,504	▲	6.0%
U.S. Decennial Census

=== 2020 census ===
As of the 2020 census, Mills River had a population of 7,078. The median age was 46.9 years. 20.6% of residents were under the age of 18 and 23.5% of residents were 65 years of age or older. For every 100 females there were 94.8 males, and for every 100 females age 18 and over there were 93.6 males age 18 and over.

36.6% of residents lived in urban areas, while 63.4% lived in rural areas.

There were 2,886 households in Mills River, of which 27.6% had children under the age of 18 living in them. Of all households, 60.4% were married-couple households, 13.7% were households with a male householder and no spouse or partner present, and 20.8% were households with a female householder and no spouse or partner present. About 23.0% of all households were made up of individuals and 12.1% had someone living alone who was 65 years of age or older. There were 2,046 families.

There were 3,177 housing units, of which 9.2% were vacant. The homeowner vacancy rate was 1.7% and the rental vacancy rate was 7.6%.

Mills River racial composition
Race	Number	Percentage
White (non-Hispanic)	6,202	87.62%
Black or African American (non-Hispanic)	101	1.43%
Native American	9	0.13%
Asian	62	0.88%
Pacific Islander	25	0.35%
Other/Mixed	275	3.89%
Hispanic or Latino	404	5.71%

== Government ==
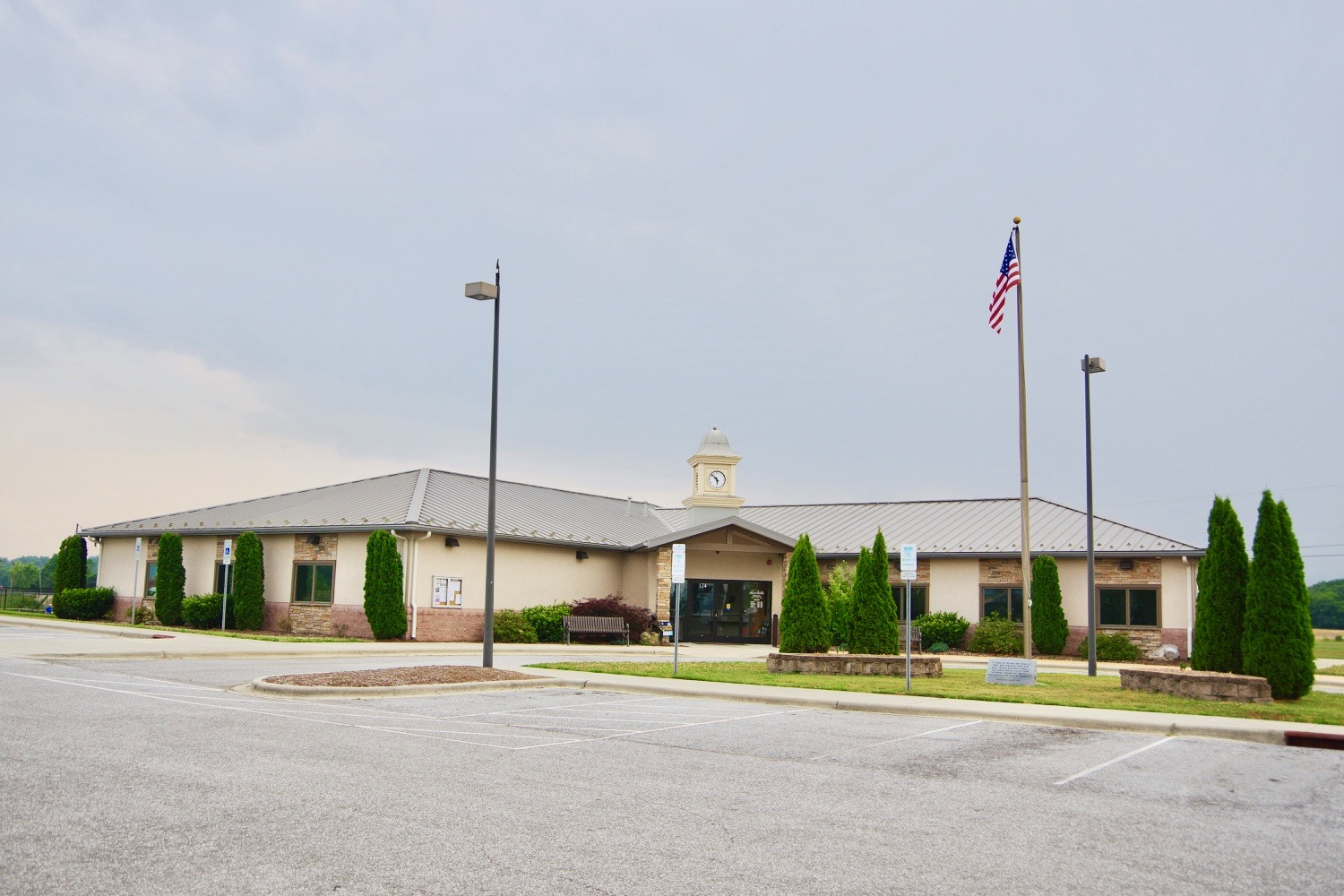
Town hall

The current mayor is Shanon Gonce, who took office in December 2021, elected by his fellow town council members. The current town council members are Randy Austin (2019), Jeff Young (appointed March 2022), James Cantrell (2021), and Sandra Goode (2021). Councilman Austin also serves the role of Mayor Pro Tem.

Mills River is home to two public schools: Mills River Elementary, Glenn C. Marlow Elementary, and is served Rugby Middle School, and West Henderson High School.

The Town Hall and Library are located at 124 Town Center Drive. Surrounding the Town Hall is Mills River Park, whose master plan includes ball fields, soccer fields, tennis courts, playgrounds, multi-use trails, a dog park, shelters and support facilities. The Mills River runs along the northern boundary of the property.
