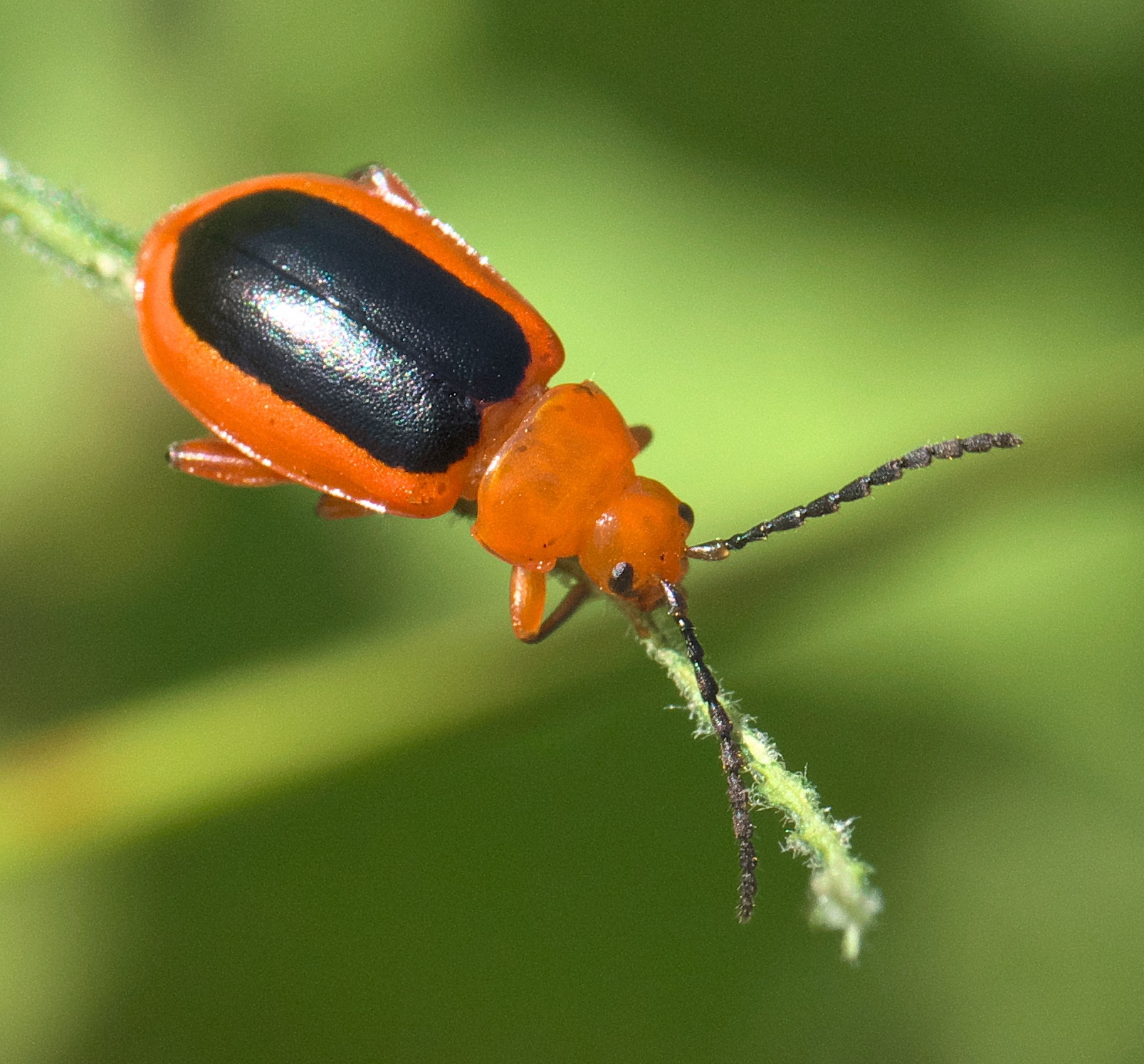

Scientific classification
- Kingdom: Animalia
- Phylum: Arthropoda
- Clade: Pancrustacea
- Class: Insecta
- Order: Coleoptera
- Suborder: Polyphaga
- Infraorder: Cucujiformia
- Family: Chrysomelidae
- Genus: Disonycha
- Species: D. discoidea

Binomial name
- Disonycha discoidea (Fabricius, 1792)

= Disonycha discoidea =

Species of beetle

Disonycha discoidea, the passionflower flea beetle, is a species of flea beetle in the family Chrysomelidae. It is found in North America.

== Description ==
The adult is large for a flea beetle, roughly 7 mm long and 4 mm wide. The body is oval-shaped and orange-red (some references base the description on preserved specimens, which yellow with age). The antennae are dark, with the basal and apical joints sometimes paler.

Two subspecies are recognized, distinguished by elytra coloration:

- D. discoidea discoidea: elytra with a black discoidal spot of variable but large size, not reaching the margins.
- D. discoidea abbreviata: elytra with alternating longitudinal black and pale yellow stripes.

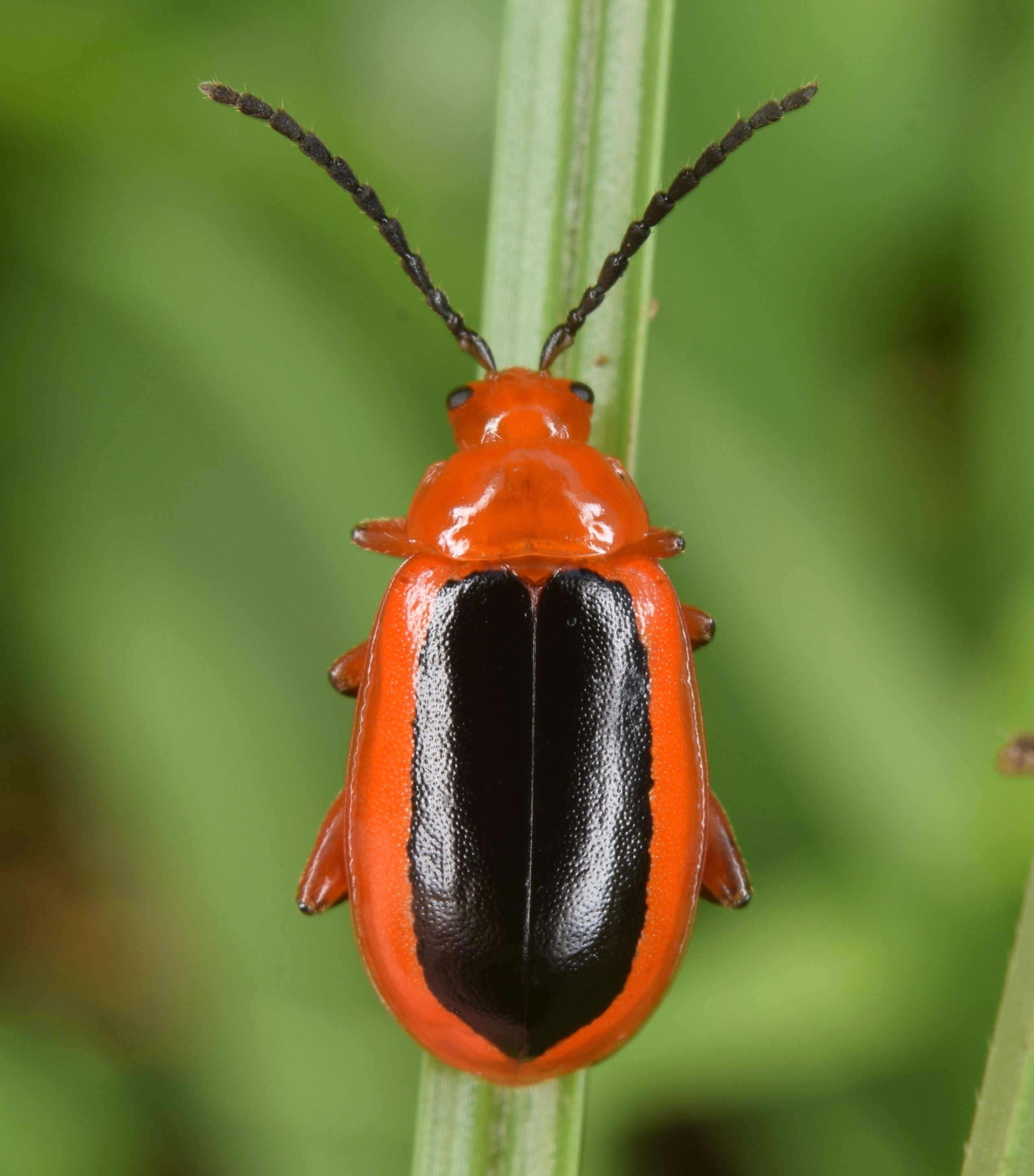
D. discoidea discoidea

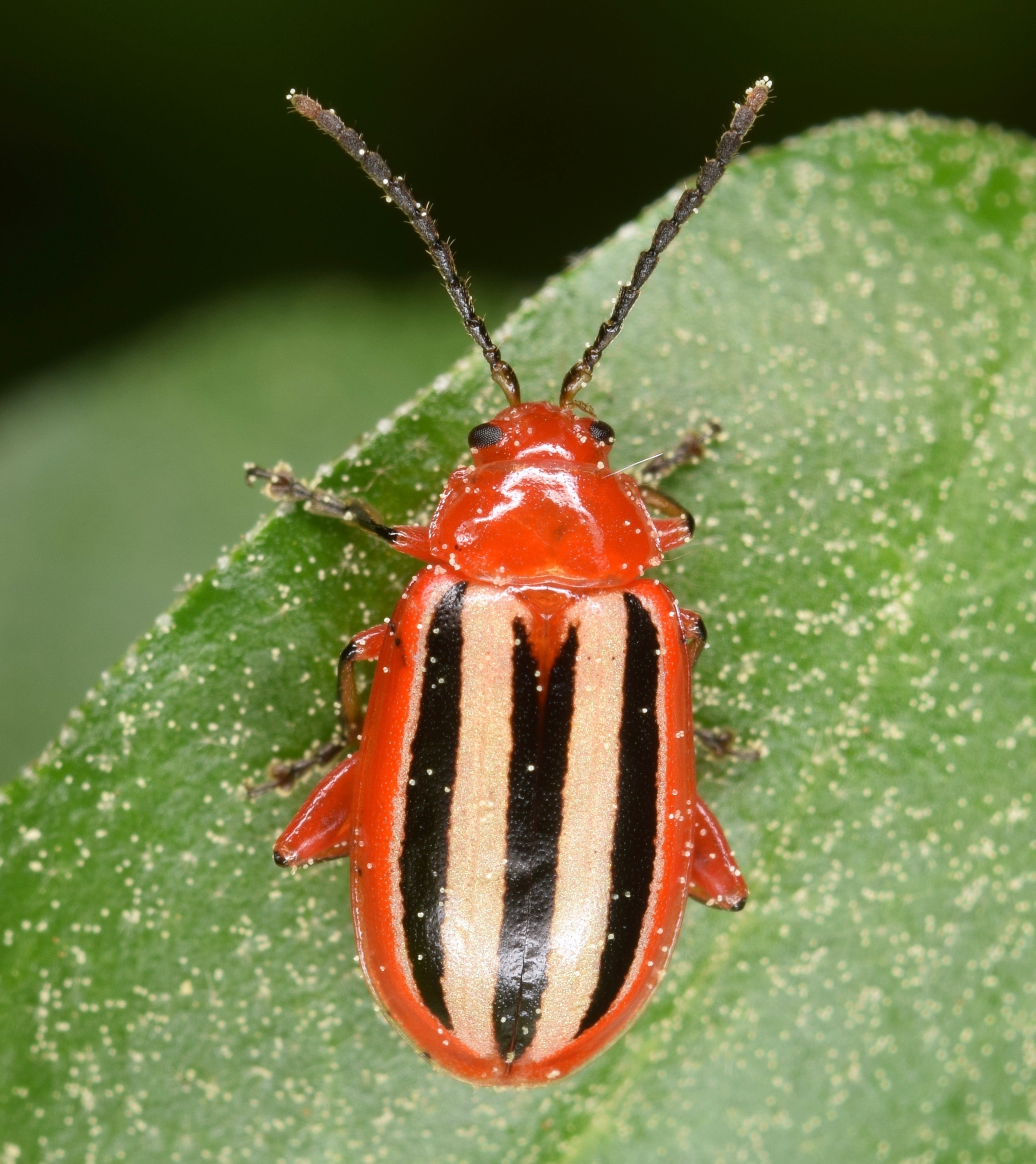
D. discoidea abbreviata

== Etymology ==
Chevrolat coined the genus name Disonycha from the Greek roots δίς (two) and ὄνυξ (claw). The specific epithet discoidea presumably refers to the disc-shaped black spot on the elytra.

== Distribution ==
Disonycha discoidea is found in the eastern United States, from Texas and Kansas in the west to Georgia and Maryland in the east. Some references report a broader range of Colorado to Florida to Rhode Island.

== Diet ==
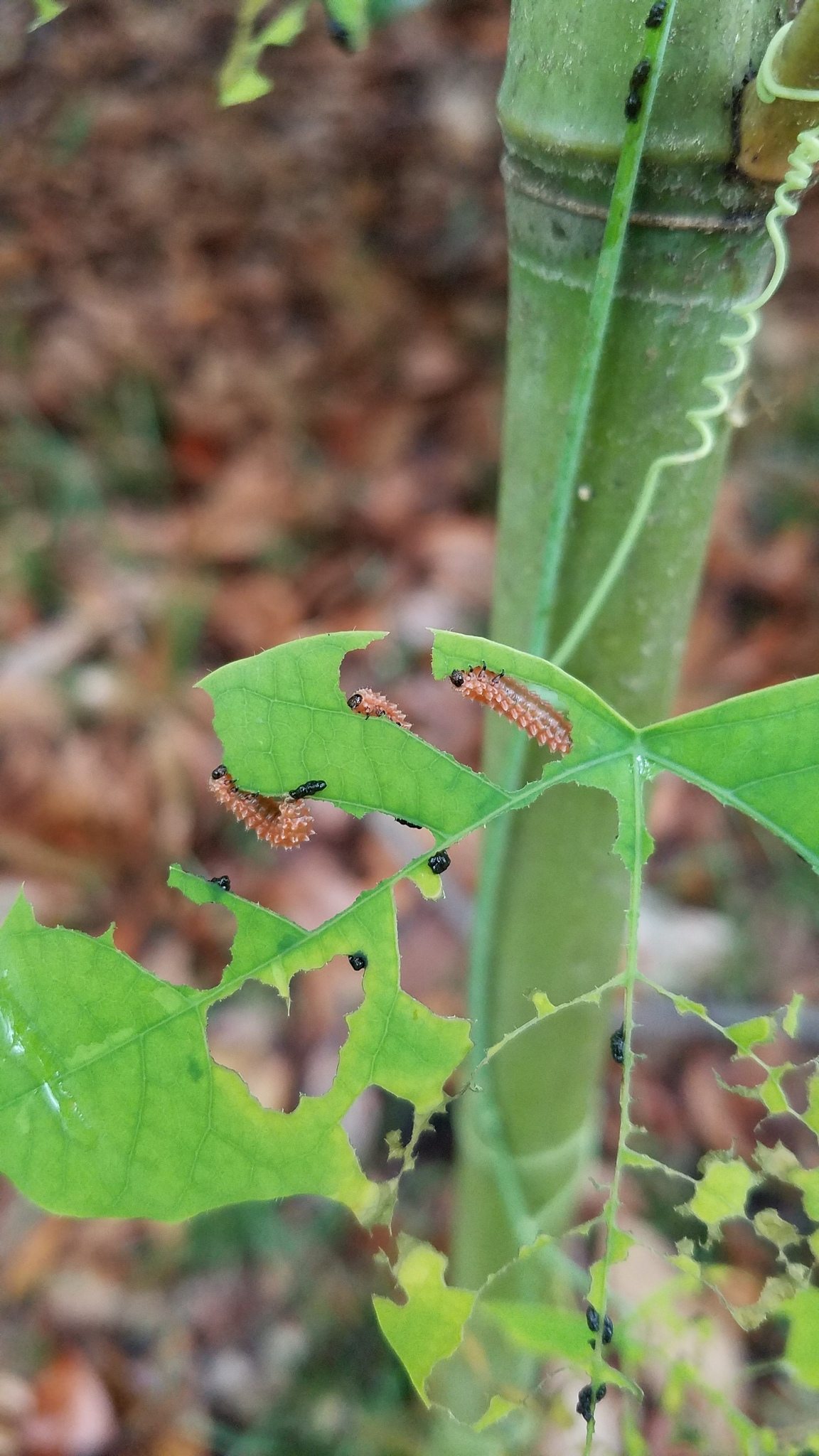
Disonycha discoidea larvae skeletonizing the leaf of a yellow passionflower.

As the common name suggests, Disonycha discoidea is a Passiflora specialist, feeding on yellow passionflower and purple passionflower. These plants contain toxic cyanogenic glycosides which other herbivorous insects are able to take in and sequester, but it is not yet known whether Disonycha discoidea makes use of them.

Disonycha discoidea has also been reported to feed on another plant, Euonymus atropurpureus, but this may be a separate, undescribed species.

Other congeneric Passiflora specialists (D. quinquelineata and D. stenosticha) have been observed cannibalizing eggs.

== Life history ==
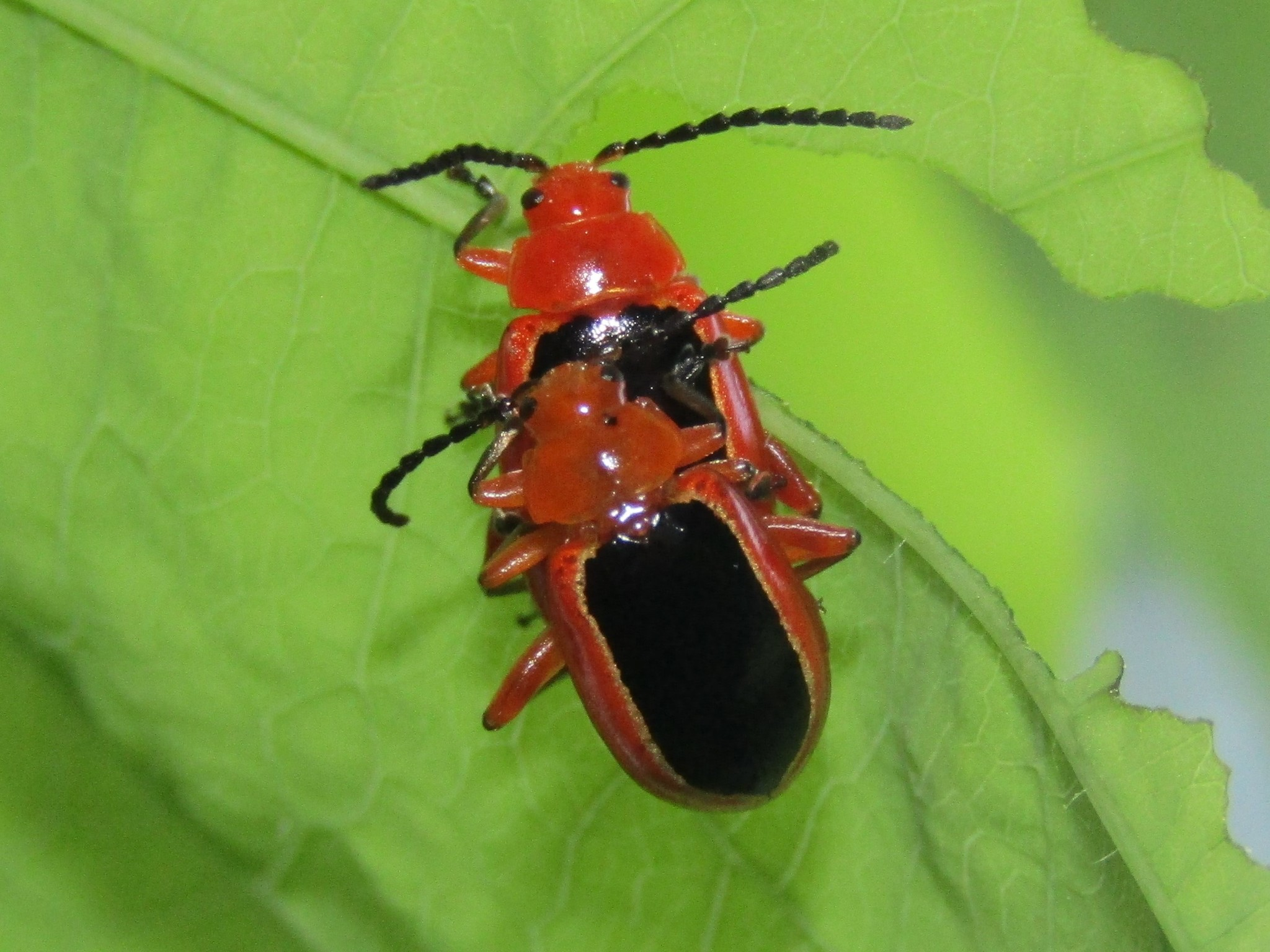
Two passionflower flea beetles copulating.

The beetle overwinters as an adult, underneath plant leaves or underground. They emerge in spring and lay eggs on or near a host plant. The larvae feed on the leaves, often in groups. They eventually pupate underground.
