= Disonycha caroliniana =

Scientific classification
- Kingdom: Animalia
- Phylum: Arthropoda
- Class: Insecta
- Order: Coleoptera
- Suborder: Polyphaga
- Infraorder: Cucujiformia
- Family: Chrysomelidae
- Genus: Disonycha
- Species: D. caroliniana

Binomial name
- Disonycha caroliniana (Fabricius, 1775)

Species of beetle

Disonycha caroliniana is a species of flea beetle in the family Chrysomelidae.

== Discovery ==
Disonycha caroliniana is found in North America.
