= Disonycha barberi =

Scientific classification
- Kingdom: Animalia
- Phylum: Arthropoda
- Class: Insecta
- Order: Coleoptera
- Suborder: Polyphaga
- Infraorder: Cucujiformia
- Family: Chrysomelidae
- Tribe: Alticini
- Genus: Disonycha
- Species: D. barberi

Binomial name
- Disonycha barberi Blake, 1951

Species of insect

Disonycha barberi is a species of flea beetle in the family Chrysomelidae. It is found in Central America and North America.
