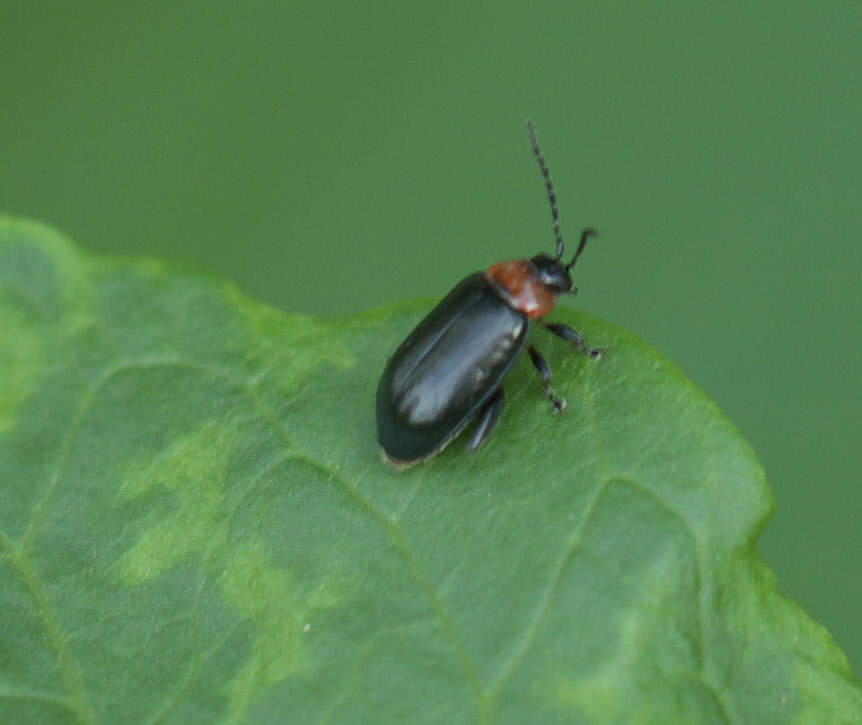

Scientific classification
- Kingdom: Animalia
- Phylum: Arthropoda
- Class: Insecta
- Order: Coleoptera
- Suborder: Polyphaga
- Infraorder: Cucujiformia
- Family: Chrysomelidae
- Genus: Disonycha
- Species: D. xanthomelas

Binomial name
- Disonycha xanthomelas (Dalman, 1823)

= Disonycha xanthomelas =

Species of beetle

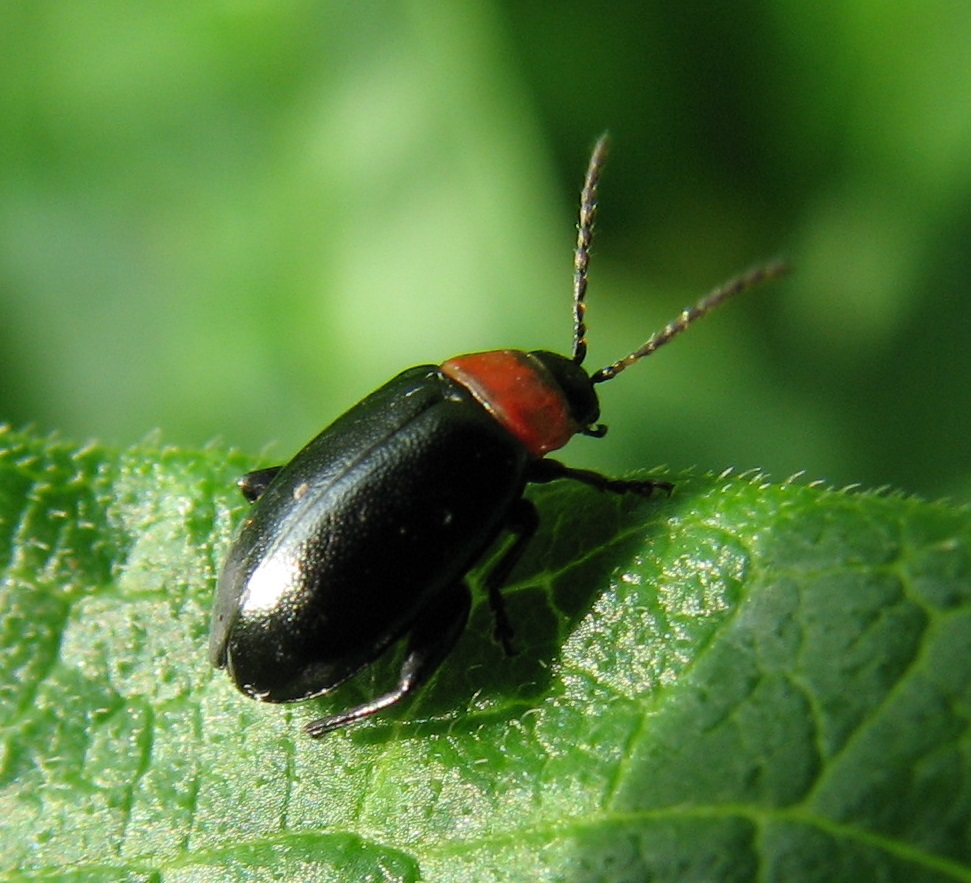
Disonycha xanthomelas

Disonycha xanthomelas is a species in the tribe Alticini ("flea beetles"), in the subfamily Galerucinae ("skeletonizing leaf beetles and flea beetles"). The species is known generally as the "spinach flea beetle". It is found in North America.
