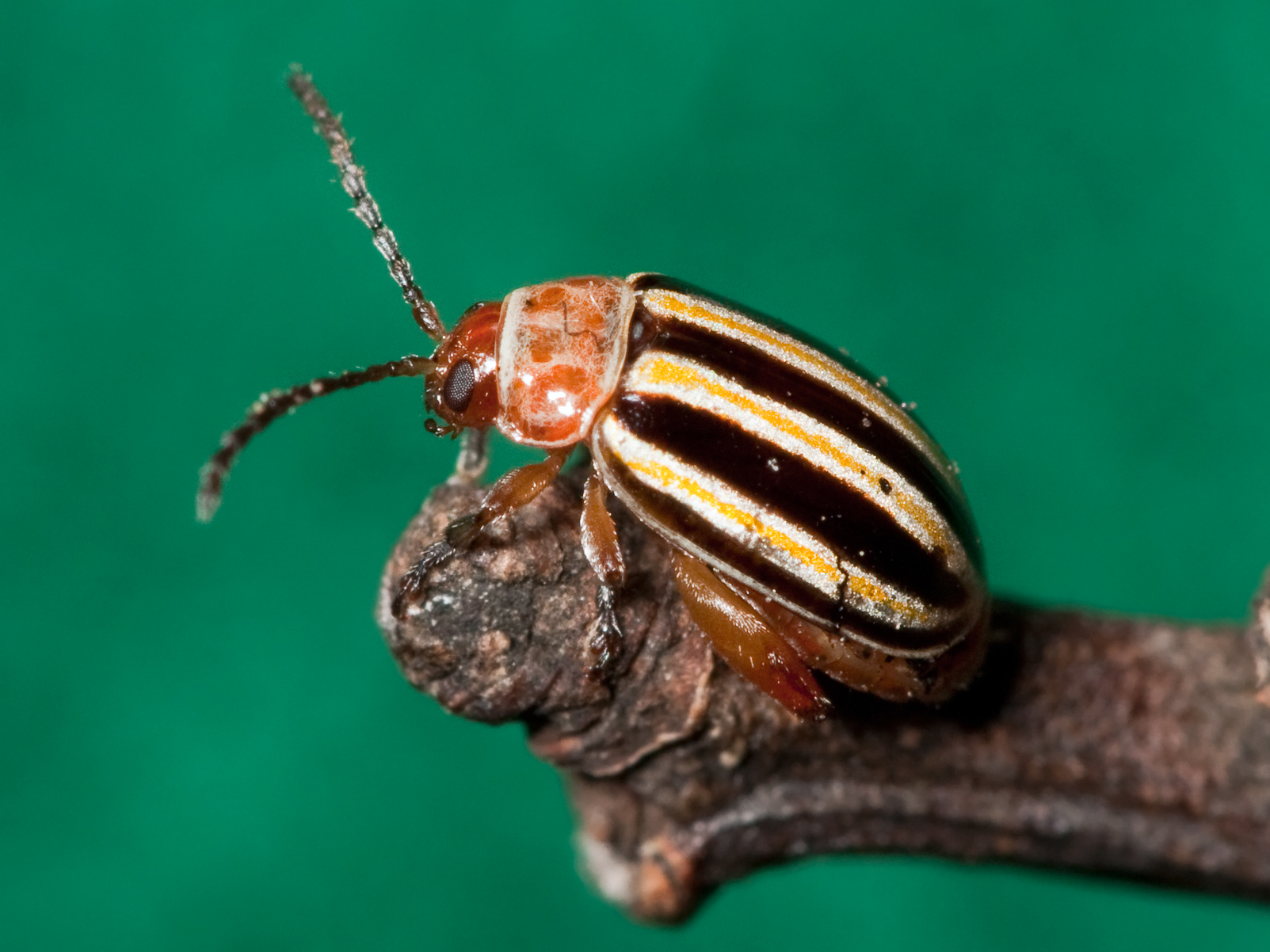

Scientific classification
- Kingdom: Animalia
- Phylum: Arthropoda
- Class: Insecta
- Order: Coleoptera
- Suborder: Polyphaga
- Infraorder: Cucujiformia
- Family: Chrysomelidae
- Genus: Disonycha
- Species: D. admirabila

Binomial name
- Disonycha admirabila Blatchley, 1924

= Disonycha admirabila =

Species of beetle

Disonycha admirabila is a species of flea beetle in the family Chrysomelidae. It is found in North America.
