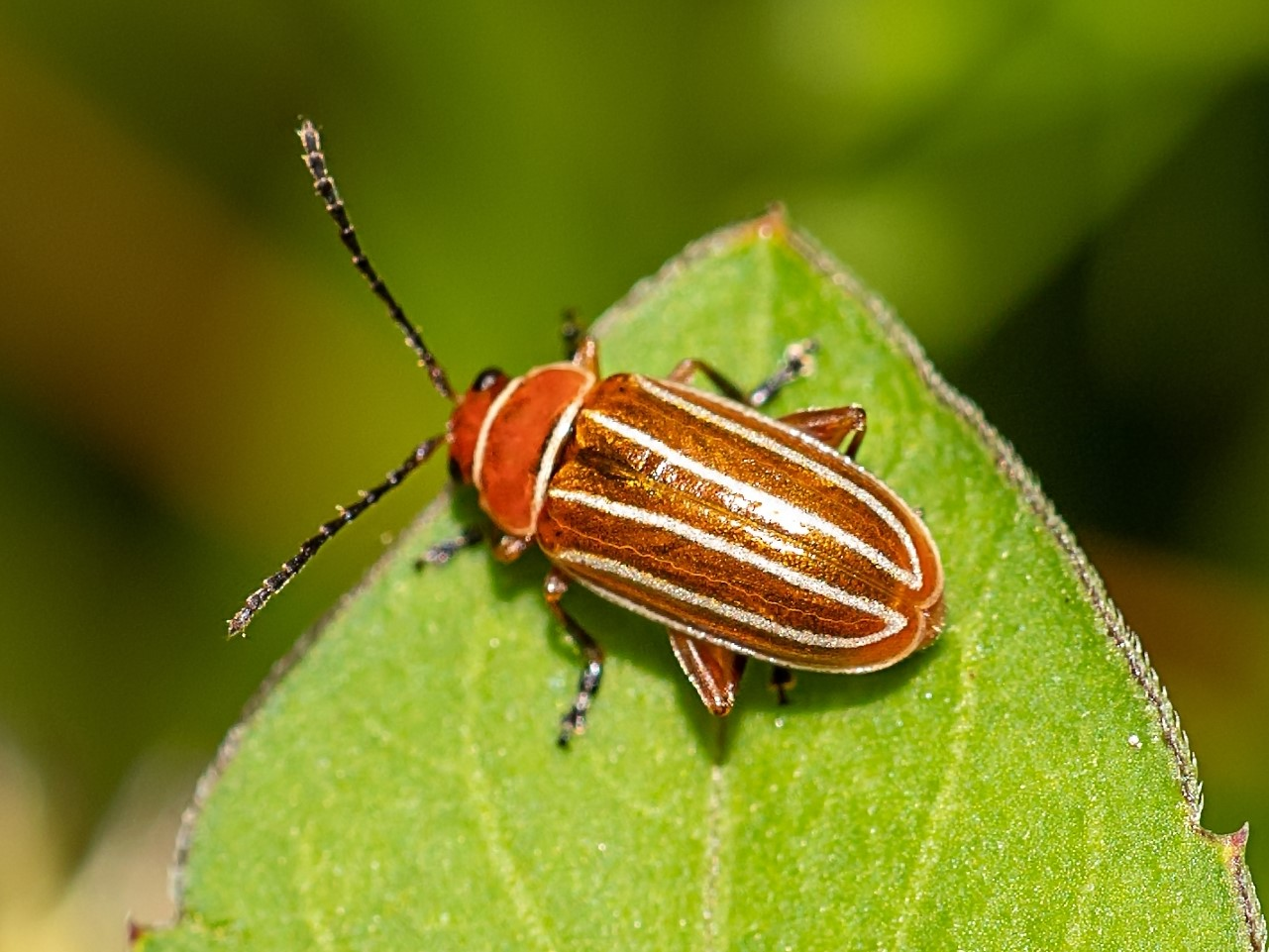

Scientific classification
- Kingdom: Animalia
- Phylum: Arthropoda
- Class: Insecta
- Order: Coleoptera
- Suborder: Polyphaga
- Infraorder: Cucujiformia
- Family: Chrysomelidae
- Genus: Disonycha
- Species: D. conjugata

Binomial name
- Disonycha conjugata (Fabricius, 1801)

= Disonycha conjugata =

Species of beetle

Disonycha conjugata is a species of flea beetle in the family Chrysomelidae. It is found in the Caribbean and North America.
