= Disonycha collata =

Scientific classification
- Kingdom: Animalia
- Phylum: Arthropoda
- Class: Insecta
- Order: Coleoptera
- Suborder: Polyphaga
- Infraorder: Cucujiformia
- Family: Chrysomelidae
- Genus: Disonycha
- Species: D. collata

Binomial name
- Disonycha collata (Fabricius, 1801)

Species of beetle

Disonycha collata is a species of flea beetle in the family Chrysomelidae. It is found in the Caribbean Sea, Central America, and North America.
