= Disonycha semicarbonata =

Scientific classification
- Kingdom: Animalia
- Phylum: Arthropoda
- Clade: Pancrustacea
- Class: Insecta
- Order: Coleoptera
- Suborder: Polyphaga
- Infraorder: Cucujiformia
- Family: Chrysomelidae
- Genus: Disonycha
- Species: D. semicarbonata

Binomial name
- Disonycha semicarbonata (J. L. LeConte, 1859)

Species of beetle

Disonycha semicarbonata is a species of flea beetle in the family Chrysomelidae. It is found in North America.
