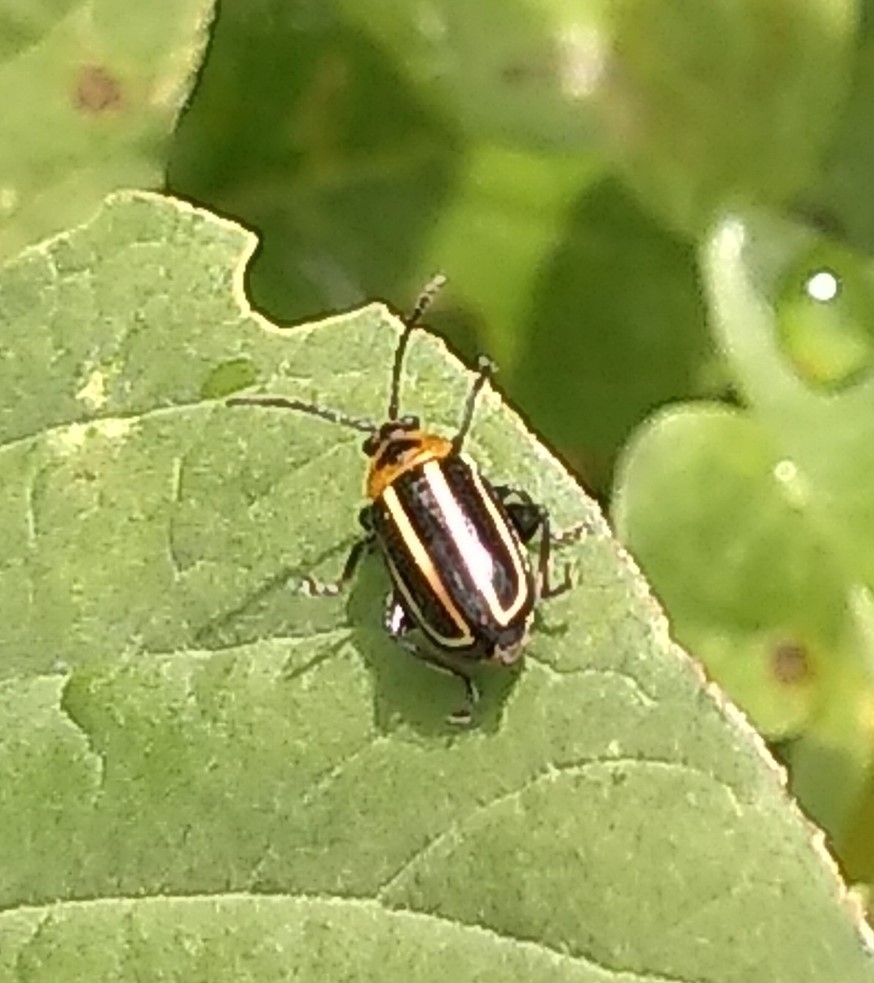

Scientific classification
- Kingdom: Animalia
- Phylum: Arthropoda
- Class: Insecta
- Order: Coleoptera
- Suborder: Polyphaga
- Infraorder: Cucujiformia
- Family: Chrysomelidae
- Genus: Disonycha
- Species: D. glabrata

Binomial name
- Disonycha glabrata (Fabricius, 1775)

= Disonycha glabrata =

Species of beetle

Disonycha glabrata, the pigweed flea beetle, is a species of striped flea beetle in the family Chrysomelidae. It feeds on Amaranthus retroflexus and lays eggs in it. The first stadium (duration of the first instar) for the larvae of this species is 3.6 days. The second stadium lasts 2.6 days, followed by 2.9 days of the third stadium, during which time the species also spends 13.5 days in the soil.
