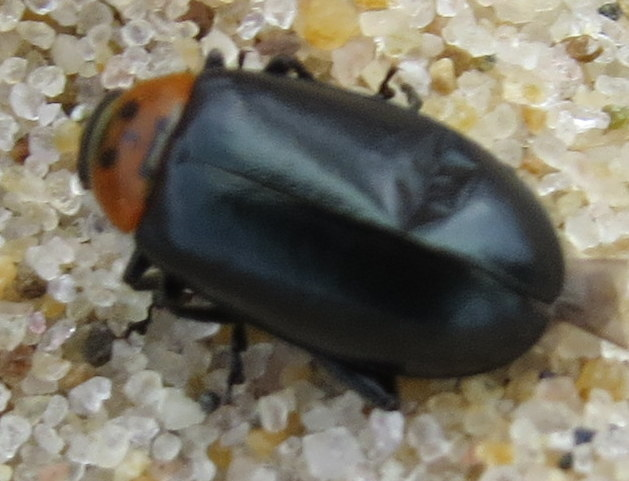

Scientific classification
- Kingdom: Animalia
- Phylum: Arthropoda
- Class: Insecta
- Order: Coleoptera
- Suborder: Polyphaga
- Infraorder: Cucujiformia
- Family: Chrysomelidae
- Genus: Disonycha
- Species: D. triangularis

Binomial name
- Disonycha triangularis (Say, 1824)

= Disonycha triangularis =

Species of beetle

Disonycha triangularis, the three-spotted flea beetle, is a species of flea beetle in the family Chrysomelidae. It is found in North America.

== Subspecies ==
These two subspecies belong to the species Disonycha triangularis:

- Disonycha triangularis montanensis Blake
- Disonycha triangularis triangularis
