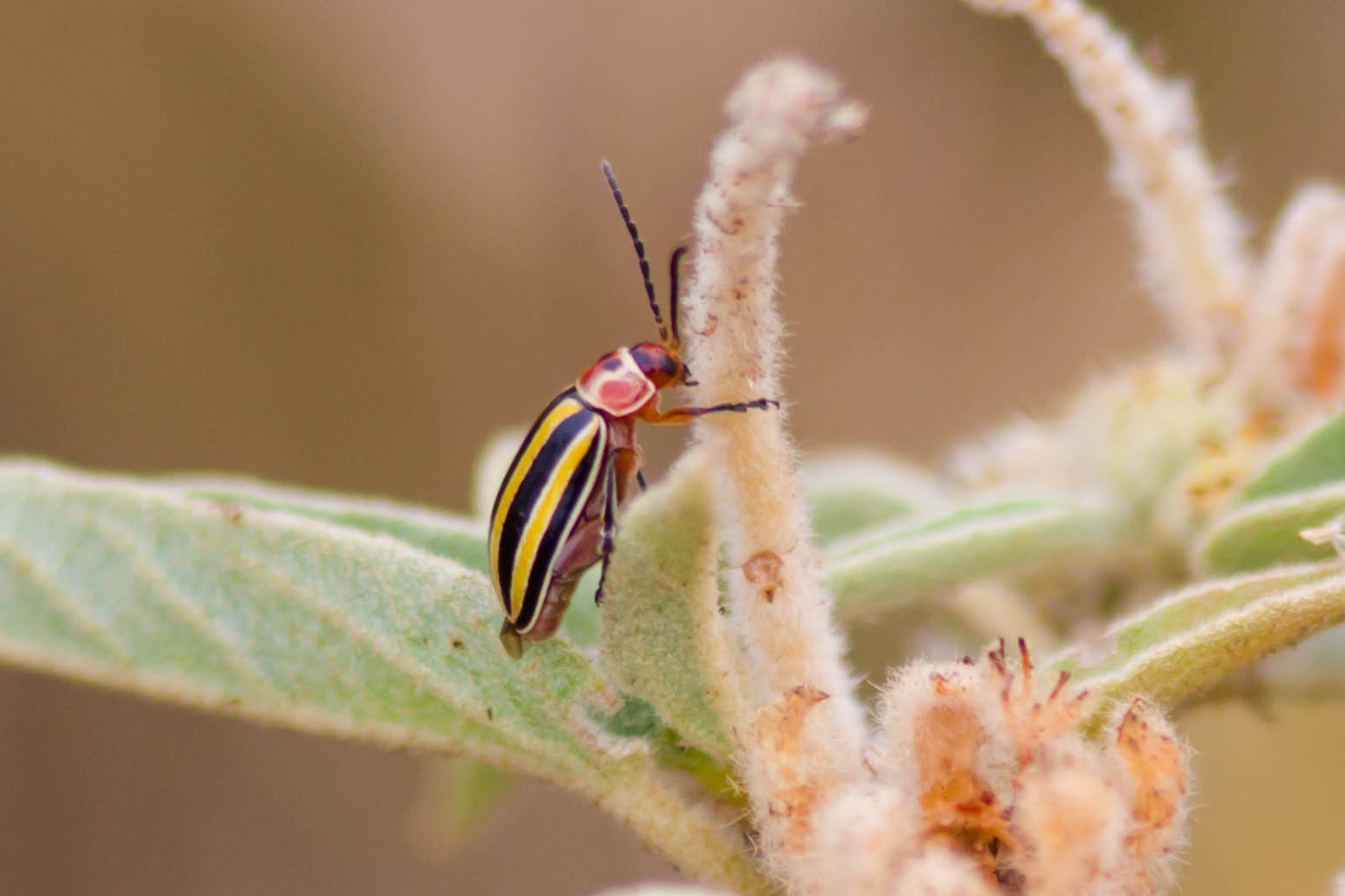

Scientific classification
- Kingdom: Animalia
- Phylum: Arthropoda
- Clade: Pancrustacea
- Class: Insecta
- Order: Coleoptera
- Suborder: Polyphaga
- Infraorder: Cucujiformia
- Family: Chrysomelidae
- Tribe: Alticini
- Genus: Disonycha
- Species: D. fumata

Binomial name
- Disonycha fumata (J. L. LeConte, 1858)

= Disonycha fumata =

Species of beetle

Disonycha fumata is a species of flea beetle in the family Chrysomelidae. It is found in Central America and North America.
