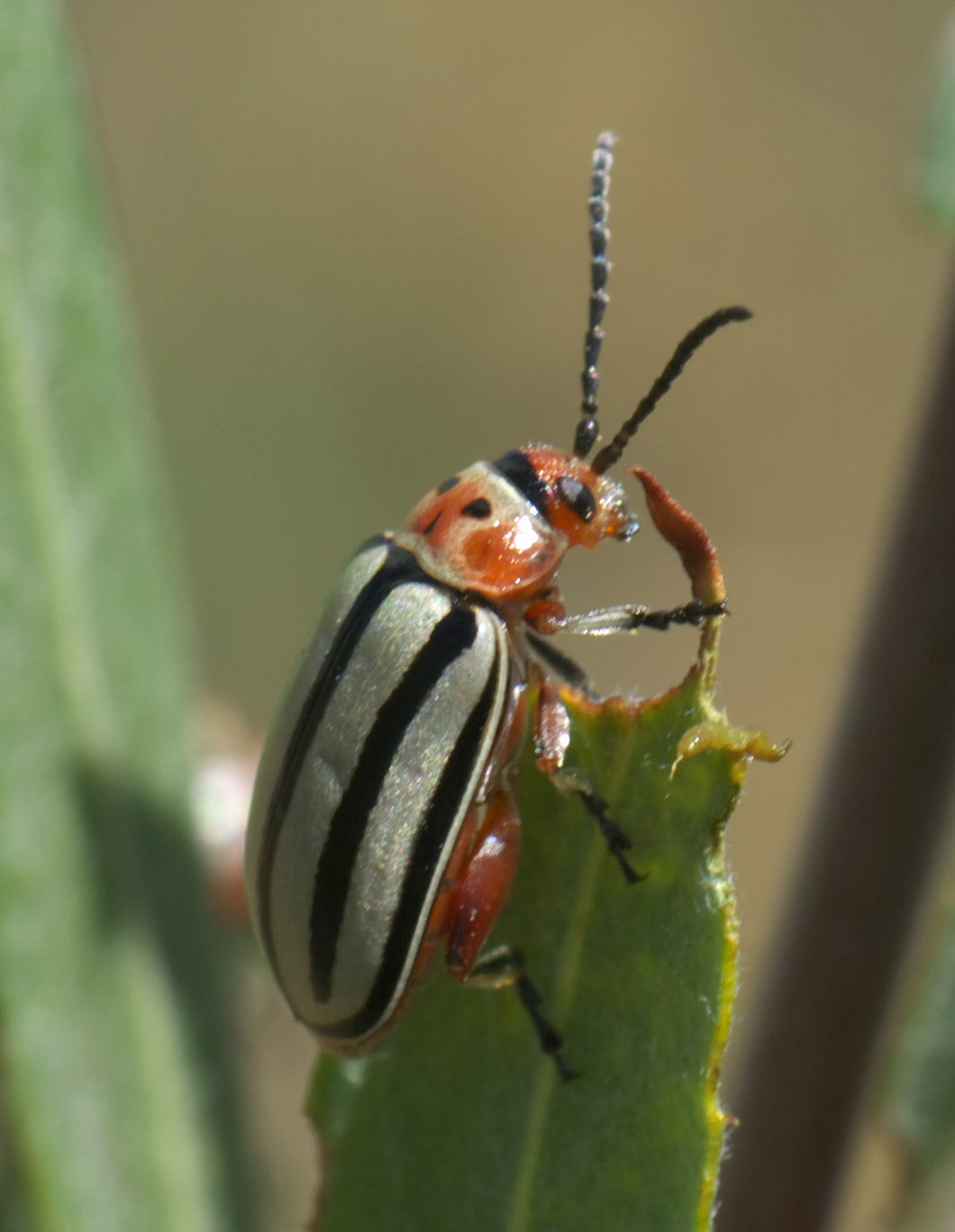
- Disonycha alternata

Scientific classification
- Kingdom: Animalia
- Phylum: Arthropoda
- Clade: Pancrustacea
- Class: Insecta
- Order: Coleoptera
- Suborder: Polyphaga
- Infraorder: Cucujiformia
- Family: Chrysomelidae
- Subfamily: Galerucinae
- Tribe: Alticini
- Genus: Disonycha; Chevrolat in Dejean, 1836

= Disonycha =

Genus of beetles

Disonycha is a genus of flea beetles in the family Chrysomelidae, containing some 170 species in the Nearctic and Neotropics.

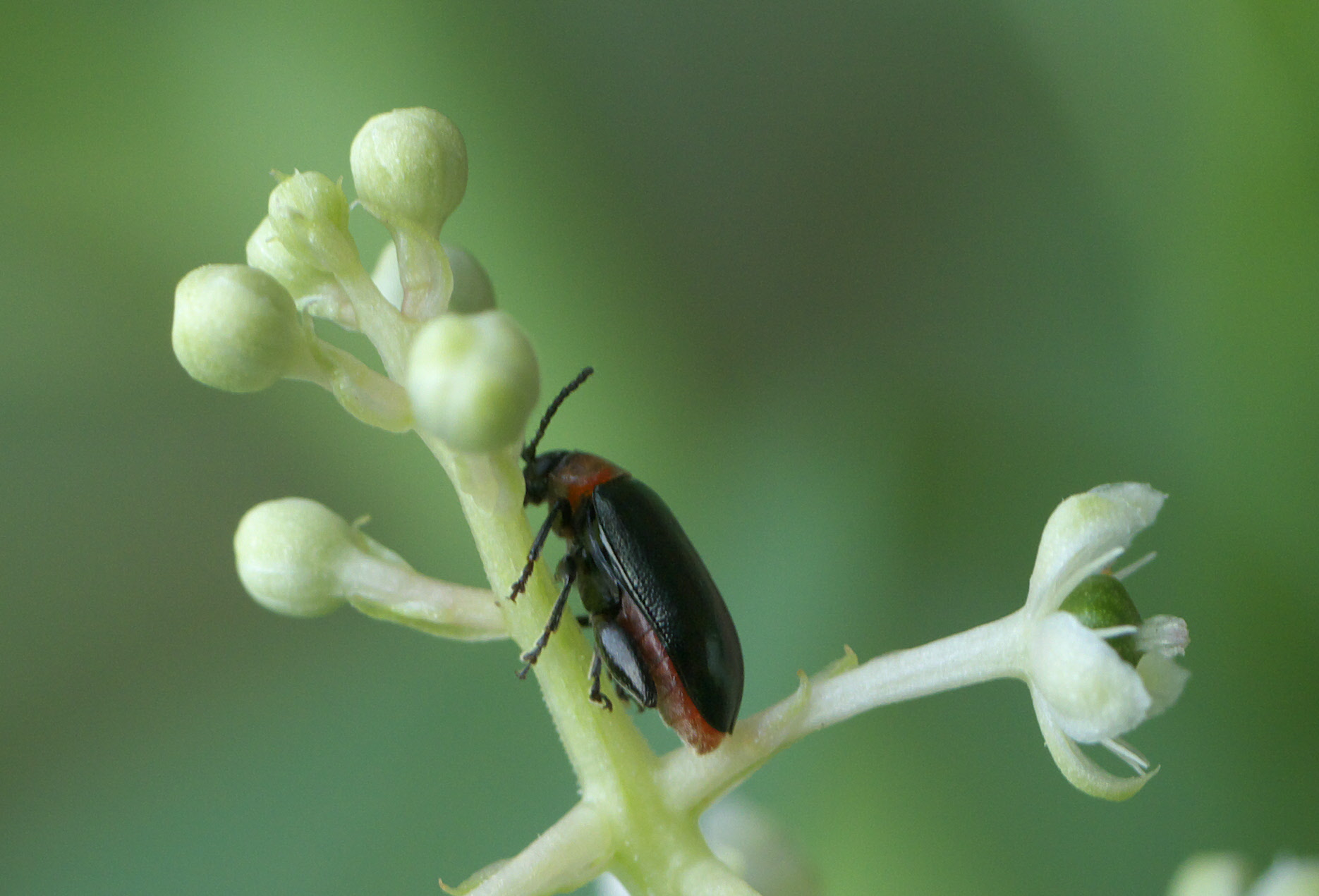
Disonycha xanthomelas

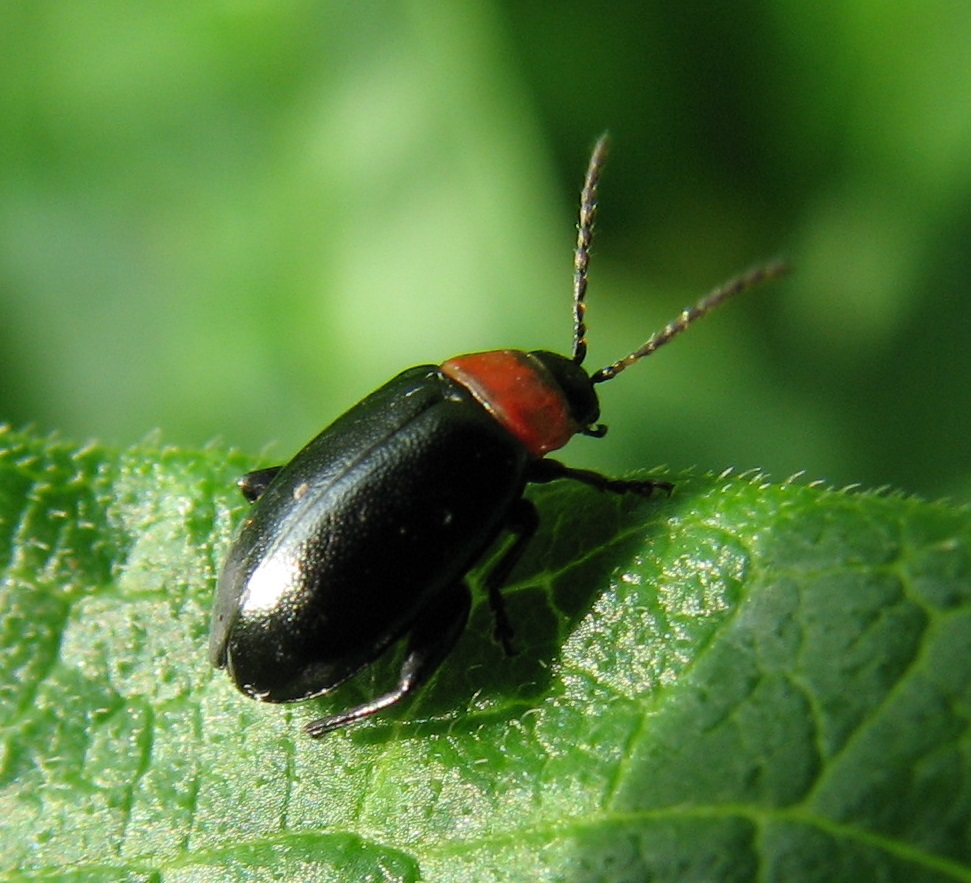
Disonycha xanthomelas

== Selected species ==
- Disonycha abbreviata
- Disonycha admirabila Blatchley, 1924
- Disonycha alabamae Schaeffer, 1919
- Disonycha alternata (Illiger, 1807) (striped willow leaf beetle)
- Disonycha antennata Jacoby, 1884
- Disonycha arizonae Casey, 1884
- Disonycha balsbaughi Blake, 1970
- Disonycha barberi Blake, 1951
- Disonycha brevicornis Schaeffer, 1931
- Disonycha caroliniana (Fabricius, 1775)
- Disonycha chlorotica (Olivier, 1808)
- Disonycha collata (Fabricius, 1801)
- Disonycha conjugata (Fabricius, 1801)
- Disonycha discoidea (Fabricius, 1792) (passionflower flea beetle)
- Disonycha figurata Jacoby, 1884
- Disonycha fumata (J. L. LeConte, 1858)
- Disonycha funerea (Randall, 1838)
- Disonycha glabrata (Fabricius, 1775) (pigweed flea beetle)
- Disonycha latifrons Schaeffer, 1919
- Disonycha latiovittata Hatch in Hatch and Beller, 1932
- Disonycha leptolineata Blatchley, 1917
- Disonycha limbicollis (J. L. LeConte, 1857)
- Disonycha maritima Mannerheim, 1843
- Disonycha pensylvanica (Illiger, 1807)
- Disonycha pluriligata (J. L. LeConte, 1858)
- Disonycha politula Horn, 1889
- Disonycha procera Casey, 1884
- Disonycha punctigera (J. L. LeConte, 1859)
- Disonycha schaefferi Blake, 1933
- Disonycha semicarbonata (J. L. LeConte, 1859)
- Disonycha spilotrachela Blake, 1928
- Disonycha stenosticha Schaeffer, 1931
- Disonycha tenuicornis Horn, 1889
- Disonycha triangularis (Say, 1824) (three-spotted flea beetle)
- Disonycha uniguttata (Say, 1824)
- Disonycha varicornis Horn, 1889
- Disonycha weisei Csiki, 1939
- Disonycha weismani Blake, 1957
- Disonycha xanthomelas (Dalman, 1823) (spinach flea beetle)
