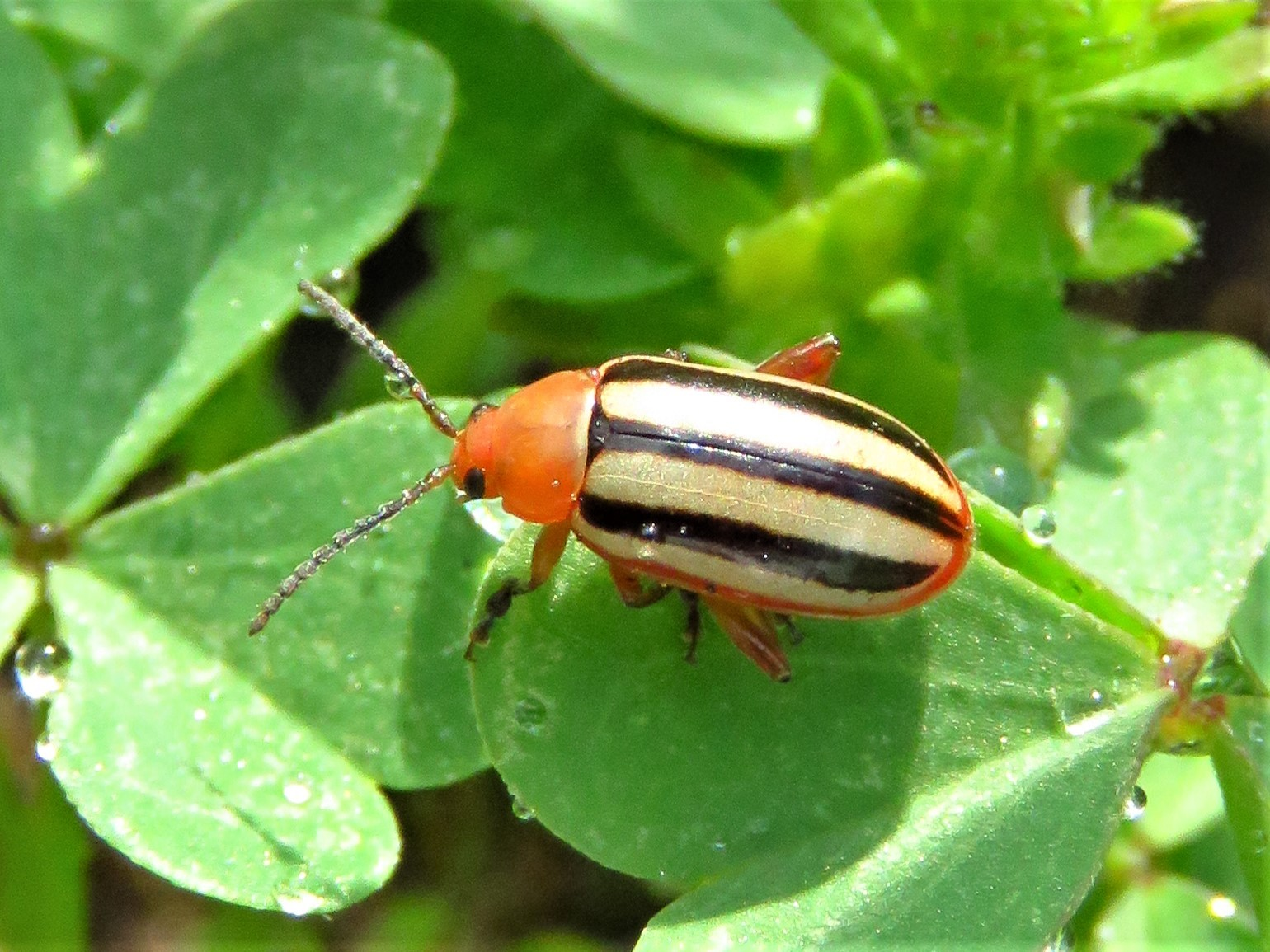

Scientific classification
- Kingdom: Animalia
- Phylum: Arthropoda
- Class: Insecta
- Order: Coleoptera
- Suborder: Polyphaga
- Infraorder: Cucujiformia
- Family: Chrysomelidae
- Tribe: Alticini
- Genus: Disonycha
- Species: D. leptolineata

Binomial name
- Disonycha leptolineata Blatchley, 1917

= Disonycha leptolineata =

Species of beetle

Disonycha leptolineata is a species of flea beetle in the family Chrysomelidae. It is found in the Caribbean Sea, Central America, and North America.
