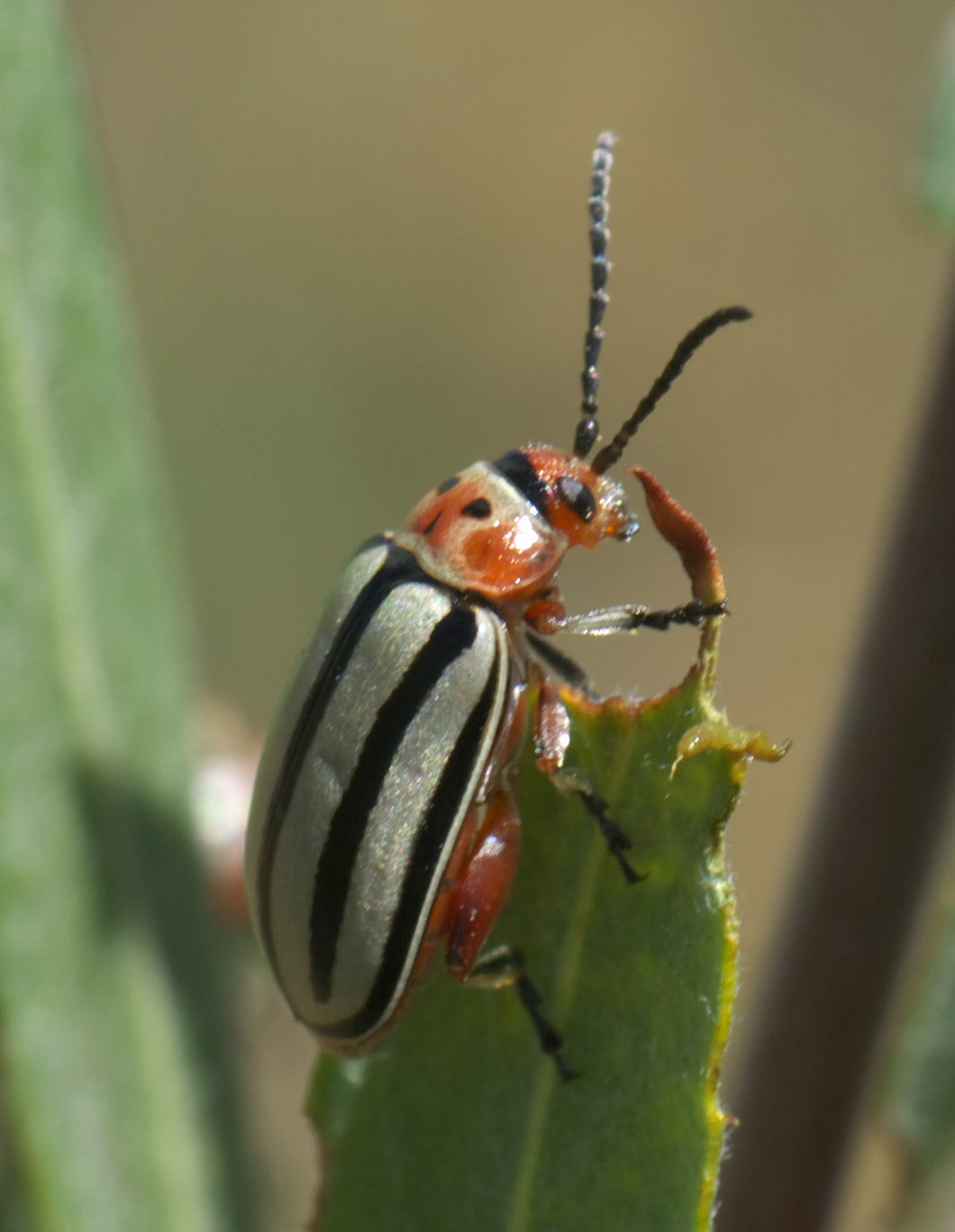

Scientific classification
- Kingdom: Animalia
- Phylum: Arthropoda
- Class: Insecta
- Order: Coleoptera
- Suborder: Polyphaga
- Infraorder: Cucujiformia
- Family: Chrysomelidae
- Tribe: Alticini
- Genus: Disonycha
- Species: D. alternata

Binomial name
- Disonycha alternata (Illiger, 1807)

= Disonycha alternata =

Species of beetle

Disonycha alternata, the striped willow leaf beetle, is a species of flea beetle in the family Chrysomelidae. It is found in North America.
