= Disonycha arizonae =

Scientific classification
- Kingdom: Animalia
- Phylum: Arthropoda
- Class: Insecta
- Order: Coleoptera
- Suborder: Polyphaga
- Infraorder: Cucujiformia
- Family: Chrysomelidae
- Tribe: Alticini
- Genus: Disonycha
- Species: D. arizonae

Binomial name
- Disonycha arizonae Casey, 1884

Species of beetle

Disonycha arizonae is a species of flea beetle in the family Chrysomelidae. It is found in Central America and North America.

== Subspecies ==
These two subspecies belong to the species Disonycha arizonae:

- Disonycha arizonae arizonae
- Disonycha arizonae borealis Blake
